= Hampton railway station (London) =

National Rail station in London, England

Hampton
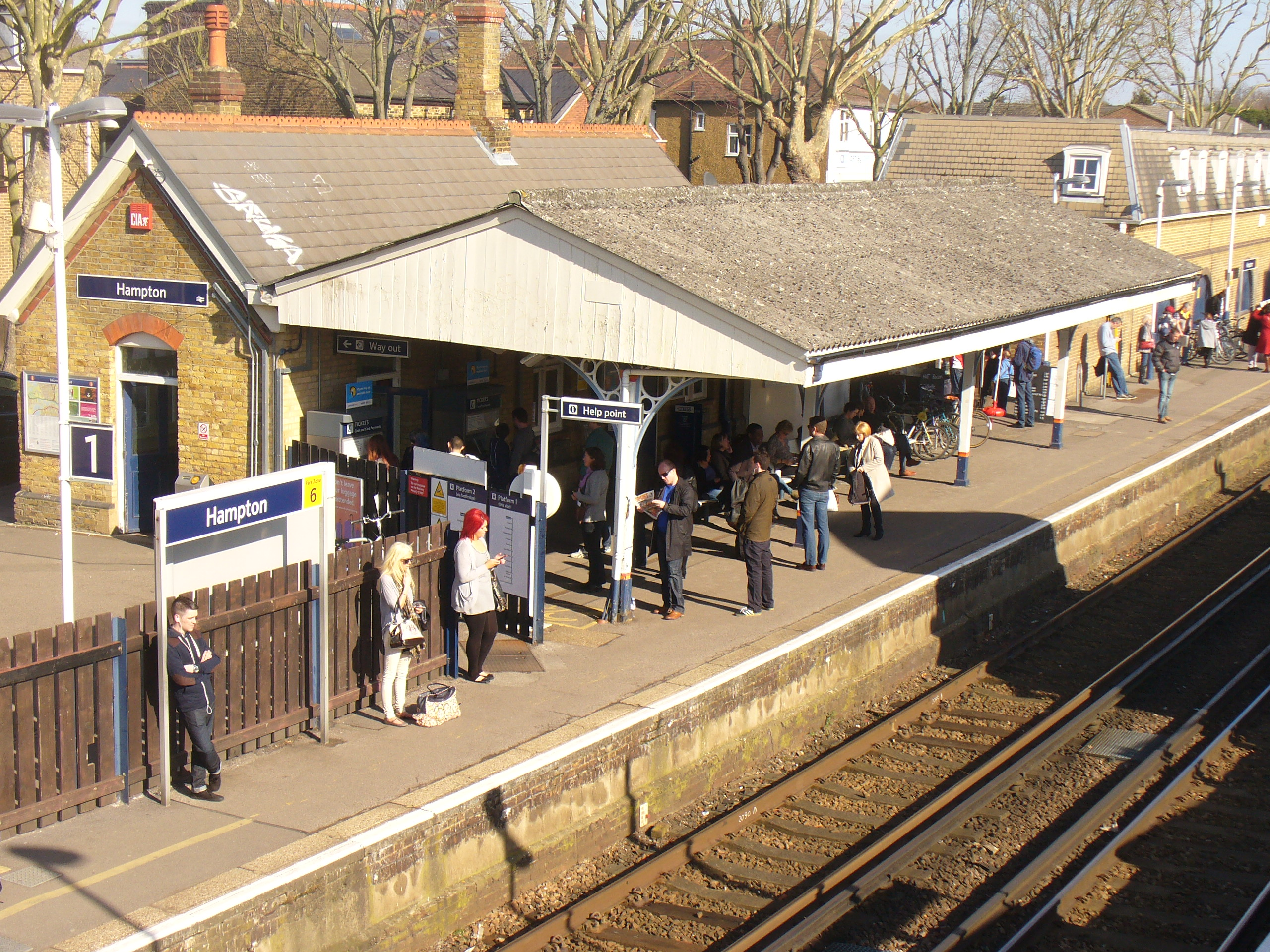
- Interactive map of Hampton

General information
- Location: Hampton
- Local authority: London Borough of Richmond upon Thames
- Managed by: South Western Railway
- Station code: HMP
- DfT category: C2
- Number of platforms: 2
- Accessible: Yes
- Fare zone: 6

National Rail annual entry and exit
- 2020–21: ▼0.180 million
- 2021–22: ▲0.526 million
- 2022–23: ▲0.750 million
- 2023–24: ▲0.884 million
- 2024–25: ▲0.949 million

Key dates
- 1 November 1864: Opened

Other information
- External links: Departures; Facilities
- Coordinates: 51.4159°N 0.3717°W

Hampton railway station, serving Hampton in the London Borough of Richmond upon Thames, is on the Shepperton branch line. It is in London fare zone 6, 14 miles 47 chains (23.5 km) down the line from London Waterloo.

The station and all trains serving it are operated by South Western Railway.

== Services ==
All services at Hampton are operated by South Western Railway.

The typical off-peak service in trains per hour is:

- 2 tph to London Waterloo via Wimbledon
- 2 tph to Shepperton

During the peak hours, the station is served by four morning services to London Waterloo that run via Richmond instead of Wimbledon as well as two evening services from London Waterloo via the same route.

On Sundays, the service is reduced to hourly in each direction.

Preceding station	National Rail	Following station
Fulwell	South Western Railway Shepperton Branch Line	Kempton Park

== History ==
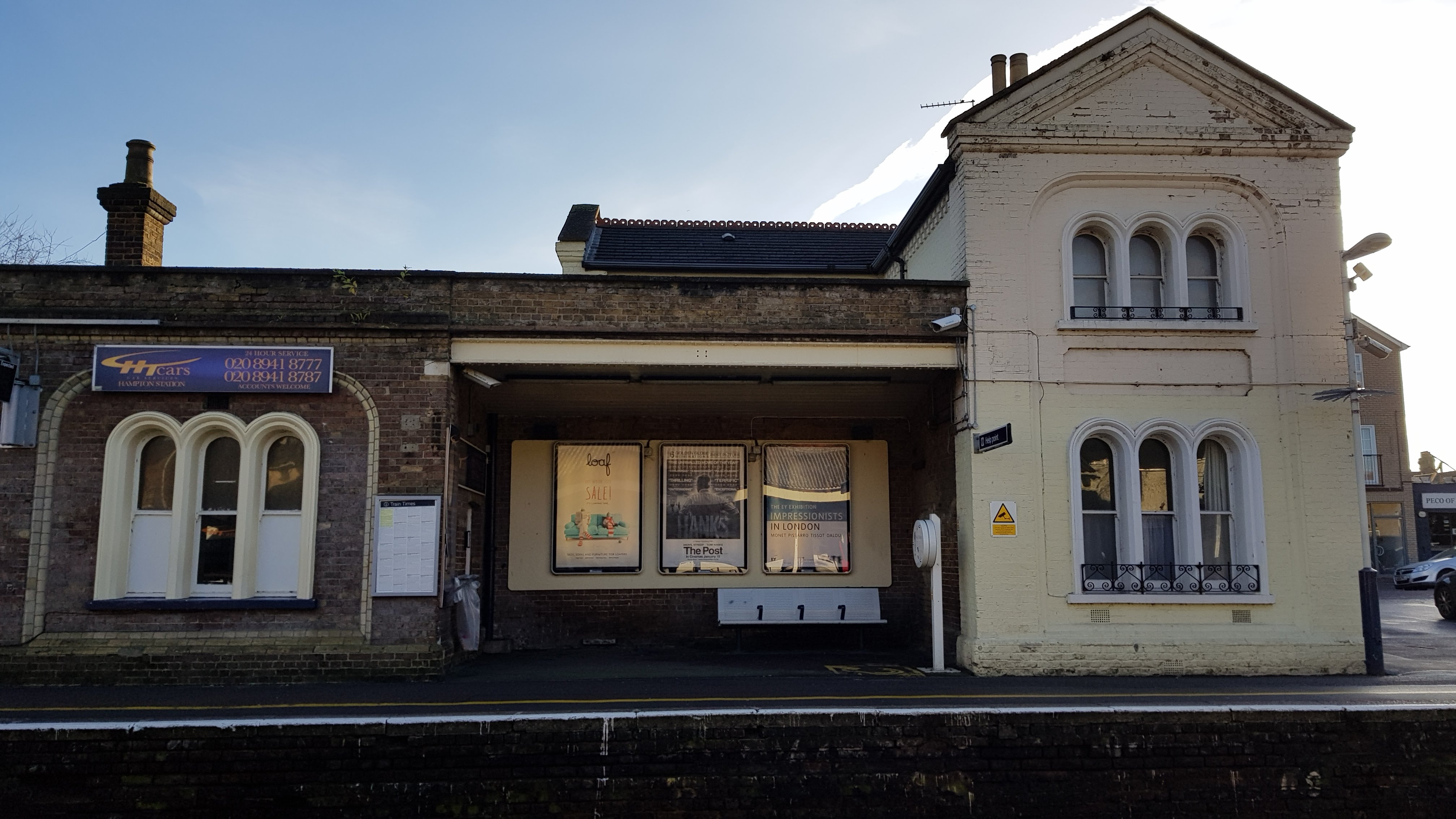
The original Hampton booking office on Station Road

The Shepperton branch opened to passengers on 1 November 1864, originally operating as a single track with passing loops. The Hampton booking office was located on Station Road, and fares to London Waterloo for 1st, 2nd and 3rd class were 3s, 2/4d and 1/7d respectively. Following the development of Kempton Park racecourse the line was double-tracked in 1878-1879. A line was added to connect Shepperton to Waterloo via Teddington and Kingston in 1890, but which initially opened only to freight in 1894, and did not carry passengers until June 1901. Gates and a signal box at the Percy Road level crossing were built in 1890, and the first footbridge joining the platforms at Hampton constructed in 1894. The Hampton booking office was transferred to the Waterloo-bound side in its current location on Ashley Road in July 1897. The line was electrified on 30 January 1916 and the majority of trains transferred to the Teddington/Kingston route. Hampton remained the railhead for the Shepperton branch line after the cessation of rail freight traffic to Sunbury and Shepperton in 1960, but over time freight traffic declined, and the sidings and goods yards converted to flats, such as Kempton Rise and Blenholme Court.

== Connections ==
London Buses routes 111 and 216 serve the station.
