= Hampton Hill =

Suburb of South west London

Coordinates: 51.42647°N 0.35592°W

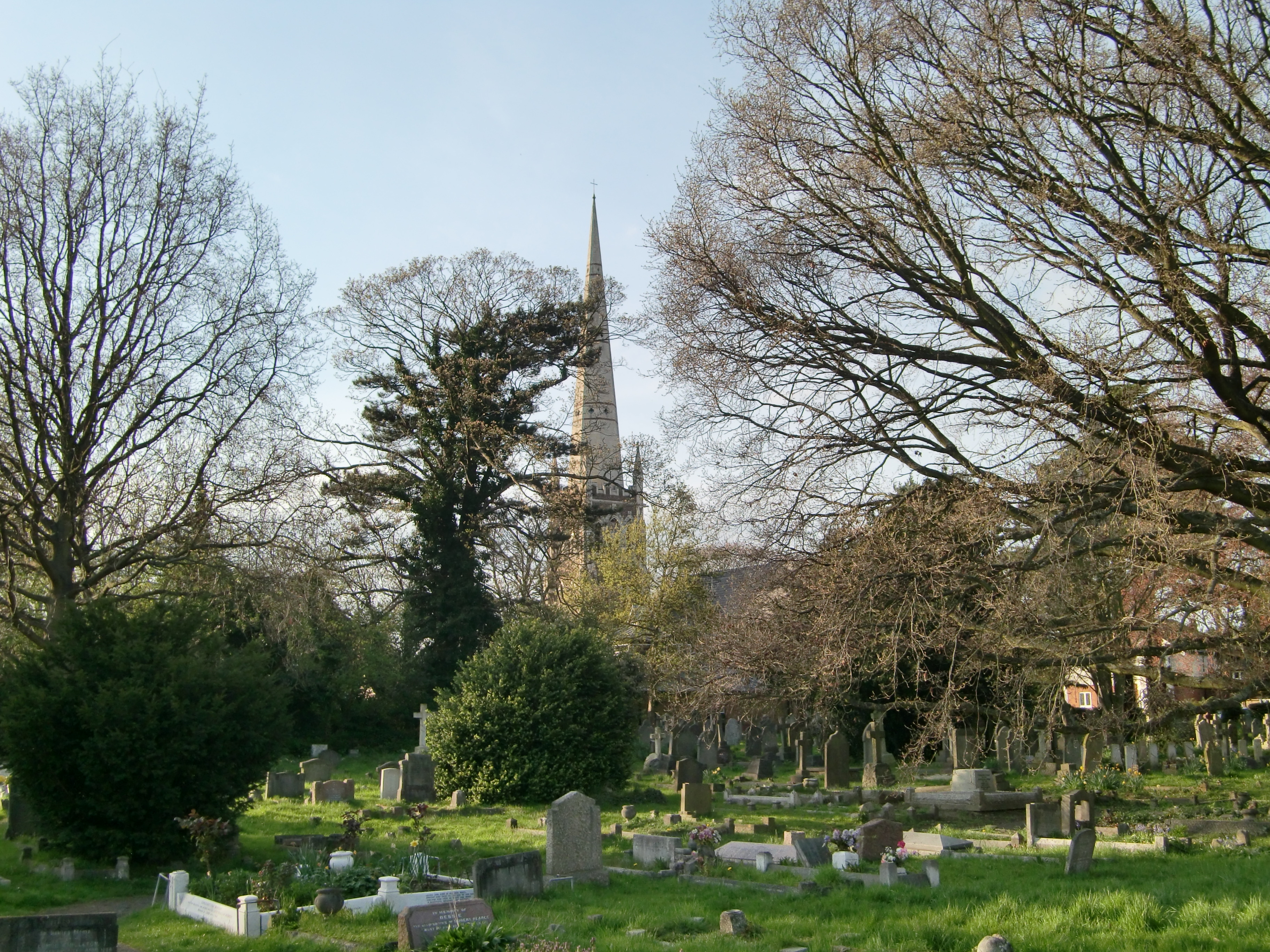
- Hampton Hill cemetery and the spire of St James's Church

- Location within Greater London
- OS grid reference: TQ144710
- London borough: Richmond
- Ceremonial county: Greater London
- Region: London
- Country: England
- Sovereign state: United Kingdom
- Post town: HAMPTON, TEDDINGTON
- Postcode district: TW11, TW12
- Dialling code: 020
- Police: Metropolitan
- Fire: London
- Ambulance: London
- UK Parliament: Twickenham
- London Assembly: South West

Hampton Hill (initially known as "New Hampton") is a district in the London Borough of Richmond upon Thames to the south of Twickenham and around 1.5 miles north of the Surrey border. It is bounded by Fulwell and Twickenham Golf Courses to the northwest; a railway line road bridge at the junction of Wellington Road and Clonmel Road; a line southward just east of Wellington Road; Bushy Park to the southeast; and the artificial Longford River to the south and west. Hampton Hill is served by Fulwell railway station and Hampton railway station on the Shepperton to Waterloo line. It is part of what is collectively known as The Hamptons. Much of Hampton Hill High Street, and some neighbouring residential areas are designated as a conservation area.

== History ==
Hampton Hill's urban development was railway-fuelled building in an area that was since the Middle Ages the north of Hampton ecclesiastical parish further away from the River Thames. Distinguished from Hampton on all street name signs, it is that part across the Charles I-commissioned Longford River, an artificial watercourse built to supply Hampton Court, which forms the boundary between Hampton Hill and Hampton.

Its lack of development is reflected by the fact only seven of this complete list of listed buildings are actually buildings:

- 167 High Street
- 127 Uxbridge Road
- Templeton Lodge
- Brick Boundary Walls to Bushy Park
- Stables & Garden Wall to Upper Lodge
- Church of St James
- Hampton Hill War Memorial (in St James' churchyard)
- Monument At south-eastern end of General Roy's Survey Base
- Upper Lodge
- Old Brew House, Bushy Park
- Bushy Park – a Grade I listed park

The oldest of the listed structures lie within the part of Bushy Park in the area; the Old Brew House may be late 17th century.

In the First World War, No 15 High Street was the drill hall of the 8th Battalion of the Middlesex Regiment. The regiment's insignia can still be seen in stone over the door.

Hampton Hill was bombed a number of times during the Blitz. The first major incident was in November 1940 when 63 Park Road was gutted when an abandoned Wellington bomber crashed on it. On the next night much of Alpha Road was destroyed and five people died after a Luftwaffe bomber dropped a landmine on it. Subsequently, Hampton Hill had a number of lucky escapes with bombs and incendiaries either failing to explode or landing in Bushy Park, Fulwell Golf Course, and other open land, with the next major incident being in June 1944 when a doodlebug exploded near Longford Close and killed one person.

== Geography ==
Hampton Hill is located in the London Borough of Richmond upon Thames. The low hill was originally common land, used for cattle grazing. There is little floodplain on either side of the river and though downhill, Hampton's riverside is only 7 metres (23 ft) beneath the maximum elevation in Hampton Hill. A comparison can be made with Strawberry Hill which is smaller and has a small noticeable incline to the east.

Aside from the residential areas of the town, the High Street is filled with shops, restaurants, several cafes, a few public houses, and a traditional 75-year-old bakery. The High Street also stages a yearly parade before Christmas when the street is closed and a procession takes place.

The Hampton Hill Association (HHA) launched its Hampton Hill Community website in 2007, with local links and telephone numbers, a What's On Guide, Gallery, History and Young Residents pages as well as information about the mission of the HHA and its committee members.

The High Street in Hampton Hill has an active traders' association. They have been organising the annual Christmas Lighting Up parade for over 40 years. In 2010 the inaugural Hampton Hill Summer Festival was organised. The Hampton Hill Traders' Association together with Richmond Council co-fund the town centre manager, Jayne Jackson. The wide range of commerce, theatre and restaurants in the High Street is documented by an annually updated Hampton Hill Guide.

Hampton Hill is home to the Hampton Hill Theatre, a small community theatre, purpose built for Teddington Theatre Club in 1998, and used by a number of other theatre groups too.

== Transport ==
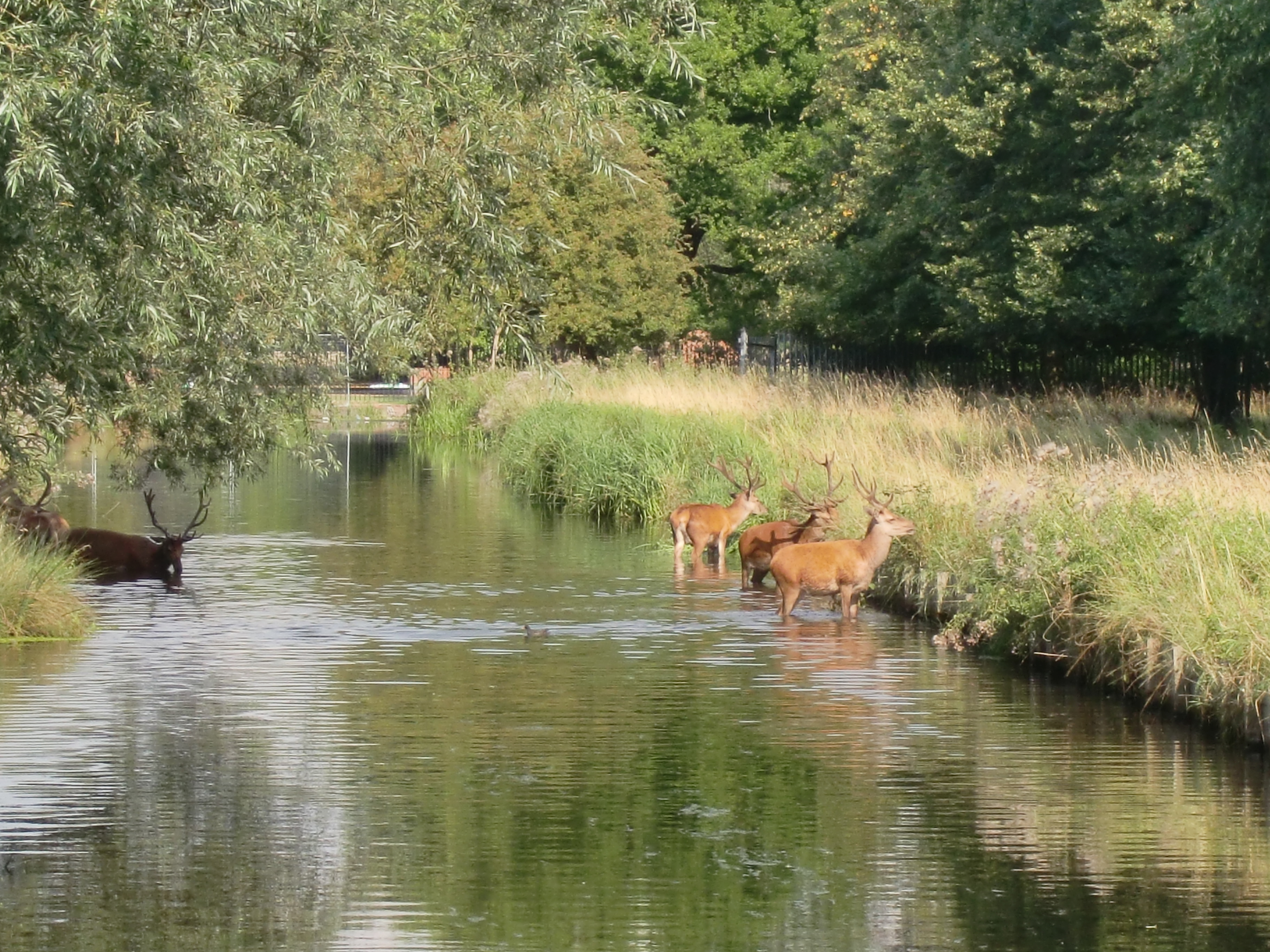
Much of the boundary between Hampton and Hampton Hill runs along the Longford River – here viewed from the Pantile Bridge

=== Bus services ===
- 285 (Kingston to Heathrow Central via Teddington and Feltham): 24-hour service
- R68 (Kew Retail Park to Hampton Court via Richmond and Teddington)
- R70 (Hampton Nurserylands to Richmond 'Circular Service' via Twickenham)

=== Trains ===
- Fulwell railway station: Trains run every 30 minutes Mon-Sat
- Hampton railway station: Trains run every 30 minutes Mon-Sat
- Teddington railway station: Trains run approximately every 15 minutes Mon-Sat

Additional train services run during the weekday morning and evening peak

== Education ==
=== Primary Schools ===
Hampton Hill Junior School is on St James Avenue. It is federated with Carlisle Infant School in neighbouring Hampton. Some Hampton Hill families use other state primary schools in neighbouring Teddington, Twickenham or Hampton.

The Juniors department of the privately operated Lady Eleanor Holles School is located in Hampton Hill, off Uxbridge Road (the Seniors are in Hampton, off Hanworth Road).

=== Secondary Schools ===
At secondary level, many local children go to Hampton High, Turing House School, Teddington School, Waldegrave School, and others.

== Churches ==
- St James' Church, Hampton Hill – Church of England, built in 1863
- Hampton Hill United Reformed Church
- Hampton Hill Spiritualist Church
- St Francis de Sales – Roman Catholic

== Sports ==
- Hampton Hill Cricket Club
- Fulwell Golf Course
- Strawberry Hill Golf Course
- Twickenham Golf Course
