= Fulwell railway station =

National Rail station in London, England

Fulwell
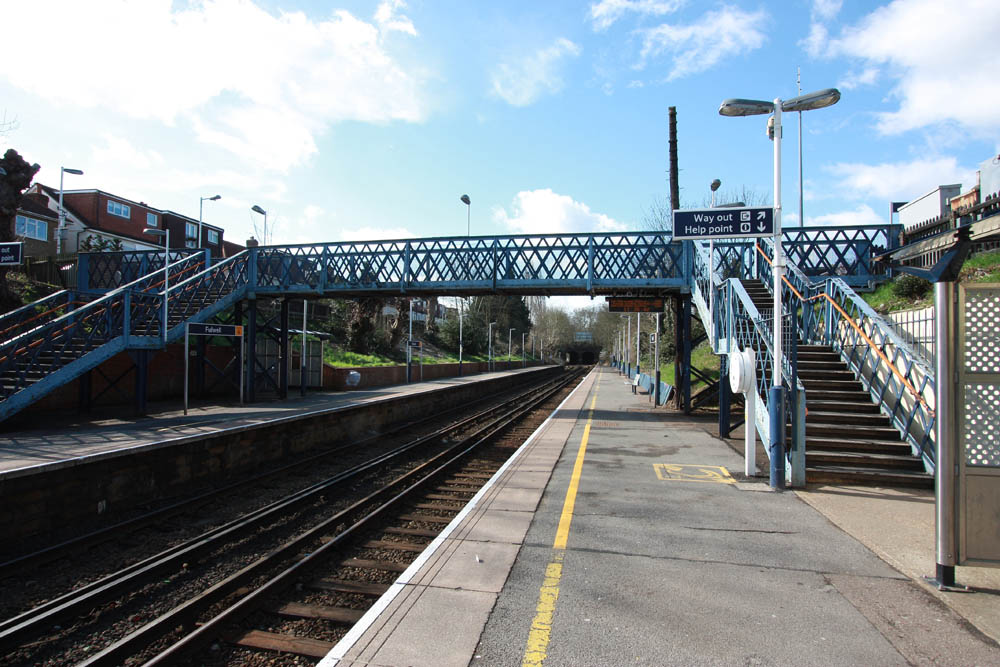
- Interactive map of Fulwell

General information
- Location: Fulwell
- Local authority: London Borough of Richmond upon Thames
- Managed by: South Western Railway
- Station code: FLW
- DfT category: E
- Number of platforms: 2
- Fare zone: 6

National Rail annual entry and exit
- 2020–21: ▼72,458
- 2021–22: ▲0.224 million
- 2022–23: ▲0.322 million
- 2023–24: ▲0.401 million
- 2024–25: ▲0.437 million

Key dates
- 1 November 1864: Opened

Other information
- External links: Departures; Facilities
- Coordinates: 51.4334°N 0.3508°W

Fulwell railway station on the Shepperton Branch Line serves Fulwell (Note: The neighbourhood of Twickenham between Hampton Hill and Twickenham Green) in the London Borough of Richmond upon Thames. It is in London fare zone 6. It is 12 miles 75 chains (20.8 km) down the line from London Waterloo.

The station and all trains serving it are operated by South Western Railway. It is situated in a cutting without direct access to main roads and thus not easy to find; a view of it can be obtained from the overbridge in Stanley Road, Teddington; road access can be gained via Wellington Gardens, off Wellington Road, between Fulwell and Hampton Hill; nevertheless it is the nearest station to Hampton Hill, which does not have its own station even though the Shepperton branch passes through it.

== History ==
The Shepperton Branch or Thames Valley Line, opened on 1 November 1864, accessed from the Strawberry Hill direction only. The original scheme intended that it would extend to a terminus on the Middlesex bank of the River Thames just east of Chertsey Bridge but this plan was abandoned in 1862.

The curve from Fulwell to Teddington opened to freight on 1 July 1894 and first carried passengers on 1 June 1901. The branch line was electrified on 30 January 1916 (at the same time as the Kingston Loop). Since a change under British Rail the large majority of Shepperton branch services have been routed via Kingston upon Thames, retaining additional peak hour services via Twickenham.

The station has never had goods facilities, but did handle parcels in the past.

The station was expected to be a calling point of Crossrail 2. That project was shelved in 2020, but the route remains safeguarded for any future revival.

== Services ==
All services at Fulwell are operated by South Western Railway.

The typical off-peak service in trains per hour is:

- 2 tph to London Waterloo via Wimbledon
- 2 tph to Shepperton

During the peak hours, the station is served by four morning services to London Waterloo that run via Richmond instead of Wimbledon as well as two evening services from London Waterloo via the same route.

On Sundays, the service is reduced to hourly in each direction.

| Preceding station | National Rail | Following station |
|---|---|---|
| Teddington | South Western Railway Shepperton Branch Line | Hampton |
| Strawberry Hill | South Western Railway: Kingston Loop Line; Peak Hours Only | Hampton |

== Connections ==
London Buses routes 33, 267, 281, 481, R70, school route 681 and night routes N22 and N33 serve the station.

== Notes and references ==
Notes
