= Kempton Park railway station =

Railway station in Surrey, England

Kempton Park
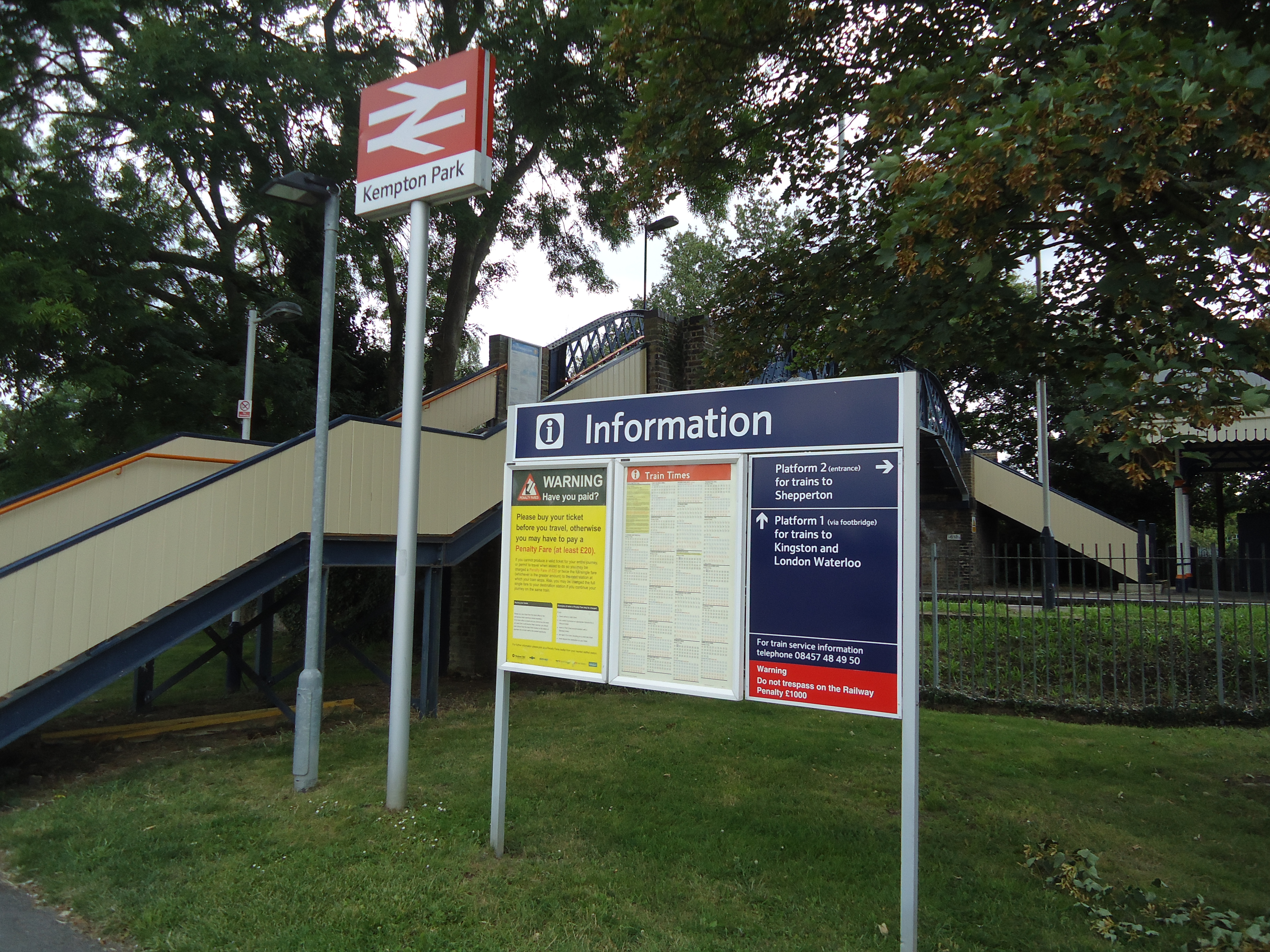

General information
- Location: Sunbury-on-Thames, Spelthorne; England
- Coordinates: 51.4210°N 0.4095°W
- Grid reference: TQ106703
- Managed by: South Western Railway
- Platforms: 2

Other information
- Station code: KMP
- Classification: DfT category F2

History
- Opened: 18 July 1878

Passengers
- 2020/21: ▼6,206
- 2021/22: ▲34,240
- 2022/23: ▲38,766
- 2023/24: ▲50,516
- 2024/25: ▲58,120
Location
Notes
- Passenger statistics from the Office of Rail and Road

Kempton Park railway station in Sunbury-on-Thames in Surrey is on the Shepperton branch line, 16 miles 26 chains (26.3 km) down the line from London Waterloo. The station and all trains serving it are operated by South Western Railway. Access is from the front car park of Kempton Park Racecourse.

Kempton Park is only around 600 metres (660 yd) from Sunbury station, the shortest distance between two stations on the line. Until June 2006 it opened only for event days at Kempton Park Racecourse; since then, following the increase in racing days and after consultation with the Jockey Club, it has had stopping services every day.

== Services ==
All services at Kempton Park are operated by South Western Railway.

The typical off-peak service in trains per hour is:

- 2 tph to London Waterloo via Wimbledon
- 2 tph to Shepperton

On Sundays, the service is reduced to hourly in each direction.

Preceding station	National Rail	Following station
Hampton	South Western Railway Shepperton Branch Line	Sunbury

== History ==
The Shepperton branch line opened on 1 November 1864. It was a single track with passing loops at stations, operated by the London and South Western Railway (LSWR) with through services to London Waterloo.

Kempton Park racecourse opened on 18 July 1878. The previous year, the company responsible for developing the venue had proposed a dedicated station on the Shepperton branch line. The LSWR initially refused the request, possibly because they were in the process of doubling the line from Sunbury eastwards and were concerned that there would be insufficient capacity to accommodate raceday trains. Nevertheless, in 1878, a private platform opened on the line immediately to the north of Kempton Park. Construction of the station was funded by the Kempton Park Racing Club and was for use its members only. A second platform was added in 1897, but the station was still not available for public use and most racegoers instead used Sunbury station, around 600 m (660 yd) to the west.

A complete rebuilding of Kempton Park station was undertaken in 1890, resulting in the addition of a third platform and improved passenger facilities, allowing the general public to use the station for the first time. On racedays, the branch, which by this time had been entirely double tracked, was worked as a single line between Sunbury and Shepperton. This arrangement allowed rolling stock waiting to operate return services for racegoers to London to be stabled on the up line, while the down line was kept clear for regular, scheduled trains.

From 1894, the raceday specials were routed via Kingston and Wimbledon. In the 1900s and 1910s, there were up to 50 special trains to Kempton Park on racedays. After electrification of the branch in 1916, the 1st-class members-only specials continued to be hauled by steam traction until 1939. Over 75,000 racegoers used Kempton Park station in 1937, but after the end of the Second World War, raceday passenger numbers began to decline and the special trains ceased in the early 1960s. The station was reduced to two platforms in October 1964.

In 1914, the Metropolitan Water Board constructed a 2 ft (610 mm) narrow gauge railway alongside part of the Shepperton branch. There was a transshipment facility at Kempton Park station. The opening of the line was delayed until 1916 and it closed in 1947.

During the First World War, Kempton Park Racecourse was used as a motor transport store for the nearby camp at Sunbury. Racing ceased again during the Second World War, when the course was used as a reception camp for prisoners of war. The prisoners were transported to the racecourse in corridor stock, hauled by Southern Railway 4-6-0 or War Department Austerity 2-8-0 locomotives.

== Bibliography ==
- Jackson, Alan A. (1999a) [1978]. London's local railways (2nd ed.). Harrow Weald: Capital Transport. ISBN 978-0-71-537479-5.
- Jackson, Alan A. (1999b). The railway in Surrey. Penryn: Atlantic Transport Publishers. ISBN 978-0-90-689990-8.
- Mitchell, Vic; Smith, Keith (1990). Kingston and Hounslow loops including the Shepperton branch. Midhurst: Middleton Press. ISBN 978-0-90-652083-3.
- Oppitz, Leslie (1988). Surrey railways remembered. Newbury: Countryside Books. ISBN 978-1-85-306005-2.
- Thomas, Roger J.C. (2003). "Prisoner of War camps (1939 – 1948)". English Heritage.
