= Sunbury railway station =

Sunbury railway station may refer to:

- Sunbury railway station, Melbourne, Australia
- Sunbury railway station (Surrey), England
