= St Margarets railway station =

St Margarets railway station may be a reference to:

- St Margarets railway station (Hertfordshire)
- St Margarets railway station (London)
