= St Margarets railway station (London) =

National Rail station in London, England

St Margarets
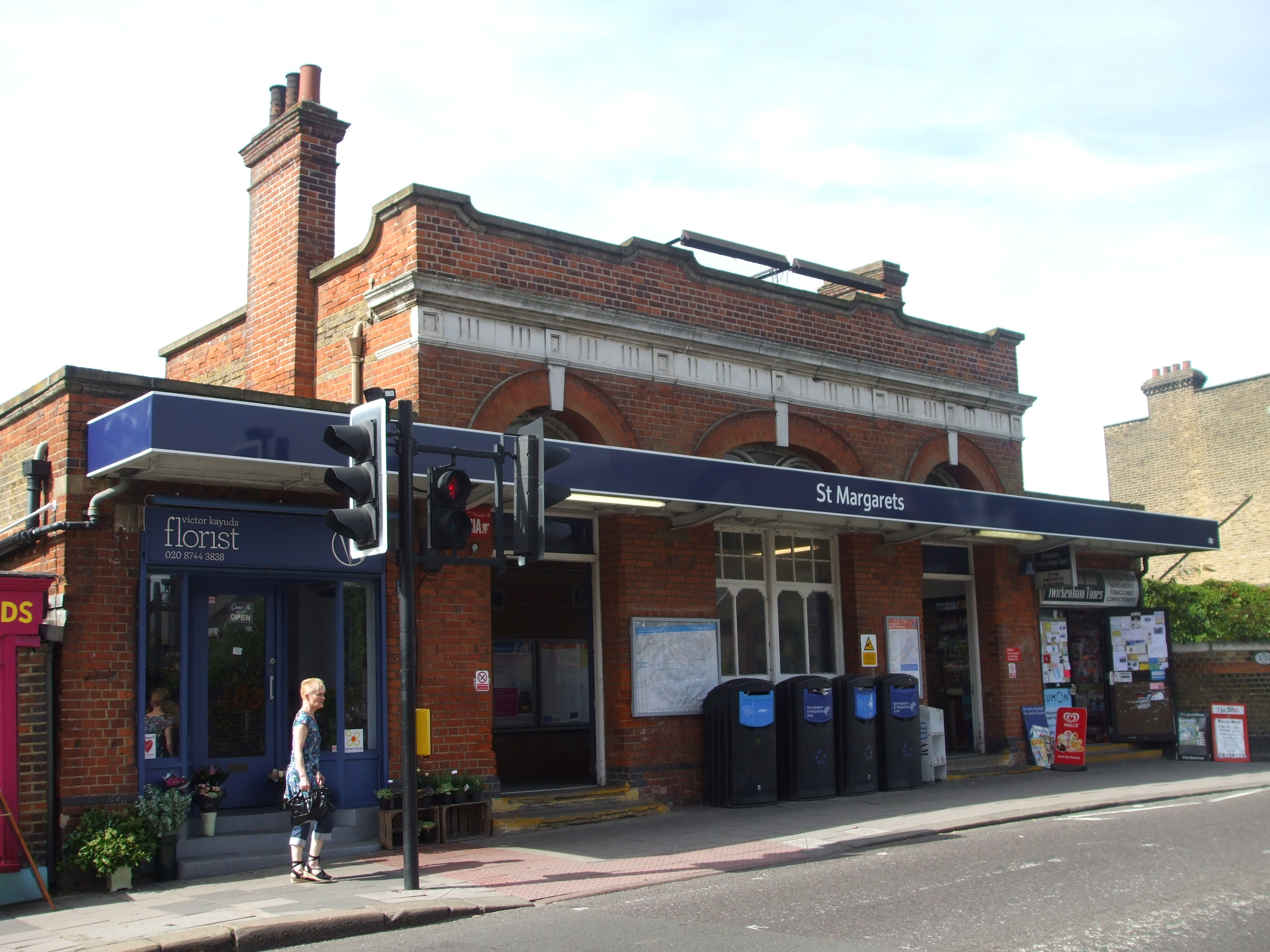
- Interactive map of St Margarets

General information
- Location: St Margarets
- Local authority: London Borough of Richmond upon Thames
- Managed by: South Western Railway
- Station code: SMG
- DfT category: C2
- Number of platforms: 3
- Fare zone: 4

National Rail annual entry and exit
- 2020–21: ▼0.281 million
- 2021–22: ▲0.650 million
- 2022–23: ▲0.820 million
- 2023–24: ▲0.946 million
- 2024–25: ▲1.015 million

Key dates
- 2 October 1876: Opened

Other information
- External links: Departures; Facilities
- Coordinates: 51.455°N 0.3204°W

St Margarets railway station, is located on St Margaret's Road, Twickenham, in the London Borough of Richmond upon Thames. It is in London fare zone 4.

It was opened by the London & South Western Railway on 2 October 1876 on the existing line from Waterloo to Windsor. It is 10 miles 66 chains (17.4 km) down the line from Waterloo.

The station and all trains serving it are operated by South Western Railway. The station entrance is at the east end, nearer to London. The station is sometimes shown as St Margarets (London) to differentiate it from the station of the same name in Hertfordshire.

== Services ==
All services at St Margarets are operated by South Western Railway.

The typical off-peak service in trains per hour is:

- 2 tph to London Waterloo via Richmond
- 2 tph to Teddington, returning to London Waterloo via Kingston and Wimbledon

Additional services, including trains to and from London Waterloo via Hounslow call at the station during the peak hours. London Waterloo to Windsor & Eton Riverside services call once an hour on a Sunday in either direction.

Preceding station	National Rail	Following station
Richmond	South Western Railway Kingston Loop Line	Twickenham

== Connections ==
London Buses routes 110 and H37, and mobility route 969 serve the station.
