= Sunbury railway station (Surrey) =

Railway station in Surrey, England

Sunbury
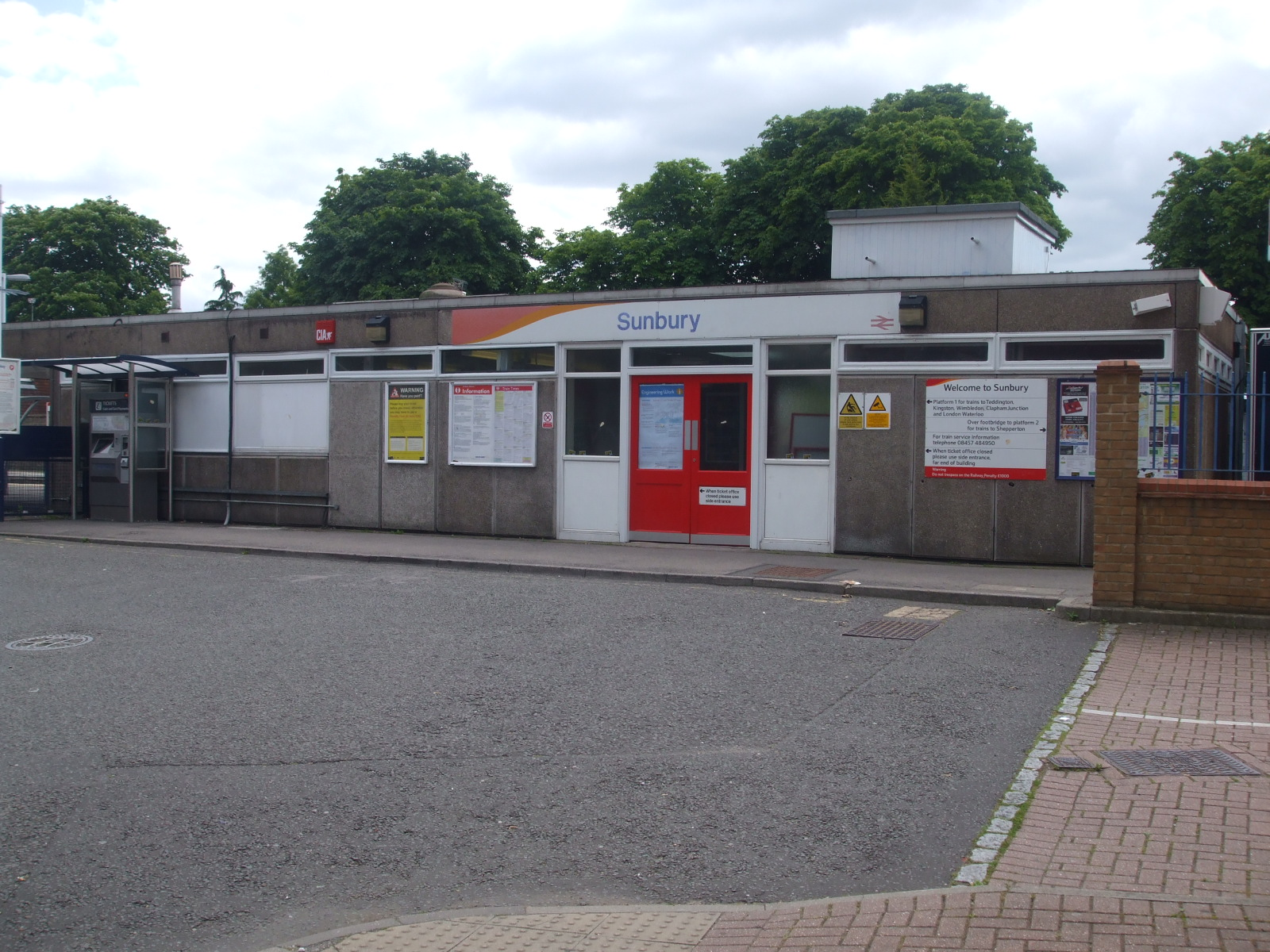
- Main London side building

General information
- Location: Sunbury-on-Thames, Spelthorne; England
- Coordinates: 51°25′06″N 0°25′03″W
- Grid reference: TQ100699
- Managed by: South Western Railway
- Platforms: 2

Other information
- Station code: SUU
- Classification: DfT category D

History
- Opened: 1 November 1864

Passengers
- 2020/21: ▼65,682
- 2021/22: ▲0.210 million
- 2022/23: ▲0.298 million
- 2023/24: ▲0.361 million
- 2024/25: ▲0.391 million
Location
Notes
- Passenger statistics from the Office of Rail and Road

Sunbury railway station serves the town of Sunbury-on-Thames, in the Spelthorne district of Surrey, England. It is 16 miles 64 chains (27.0 km) down the line from London Waterloo. The station and all trains serving it are operated by South Western Railway.

== History ==
The Shepperton branch opened to passengers with a single track on 1 November 1864. Its promoters' scheme first intended to link this to what became today's District line and potentially to Woking railway station. A second scheme (abandoned 1862) intended it to extend to the Middlesex bank of the Thames east of Chertsey Bridge to serve the established town of Chertsey. The curve linking Fulwell and Teddington initially opened to freight on 1 July 1894 and then carried passengers on 1 June 1901 as the replacement principal route. The line was electrified on 30 January 1916.

== Services ==
All services at Sunbury are operated by South Western Railway.

The typical off-peak service in trains per hour is:

- 2 tph to London Waterloo via Wimbledon
- 2 tph to Shepperton

During the peak hours, the station is served by four morning services to London Waterloo that run via Richmond instead of Wimbledon as well as two evening services from London Waterloo via the same route.

On Sundays, the service is reduced to hourly in each direction.

Preceding station	National Rail	Following station
Kempton Park	South Western Railway Shepperton Branch Line	Upper Halliford

== Connections ==
London bus routes 216 and 235, and local bus routes 555 and 557, all serve the station.
