= SUU =

SUU may refer to:

- SUU, the IATA and FAA LID code for Travis Air Force Base, Fairfield, California
- SUU, the National Rail code for Sunbury railway station, Surrey, England
- Southern Utah University, a public university in Cedar City, Utah
