= Kempton Park Racecourse =

Horse racing venue in England

Coordinates: 51°25′7″N 0°23′53″W

Kempton Park
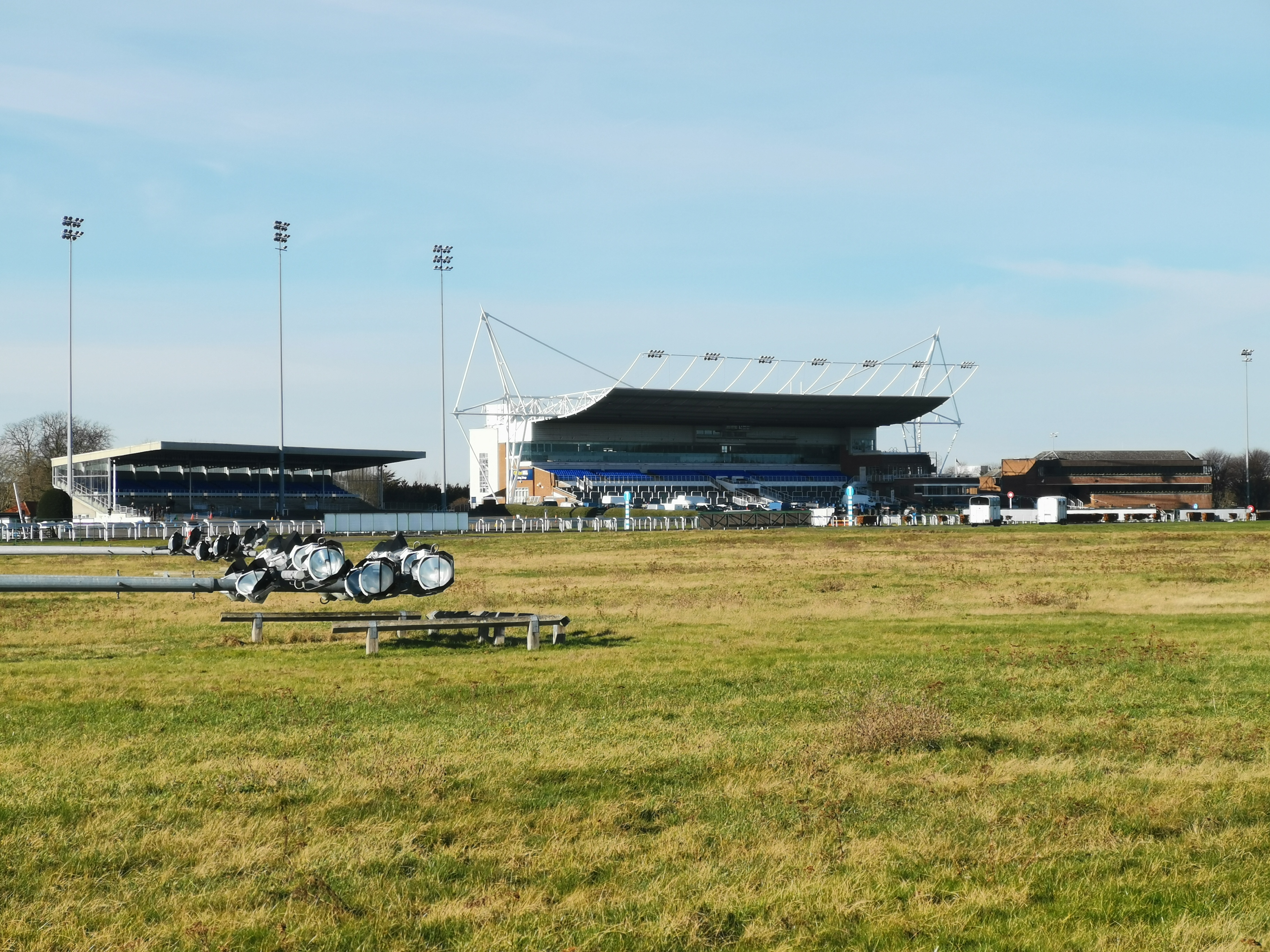
- The stands
- Interactive map of Kempton Park
- Location: Sunbury-on-Thames, Middlesex, England
- Owned by: Jockey Club Racecourses
- Date opened: July 1878
- Screened on: Racing TV
- Course type: Flat; National Hunt
- Notable races: King George VI Chase; Coral Trophy Handicap Chase; Sirenia Stakes

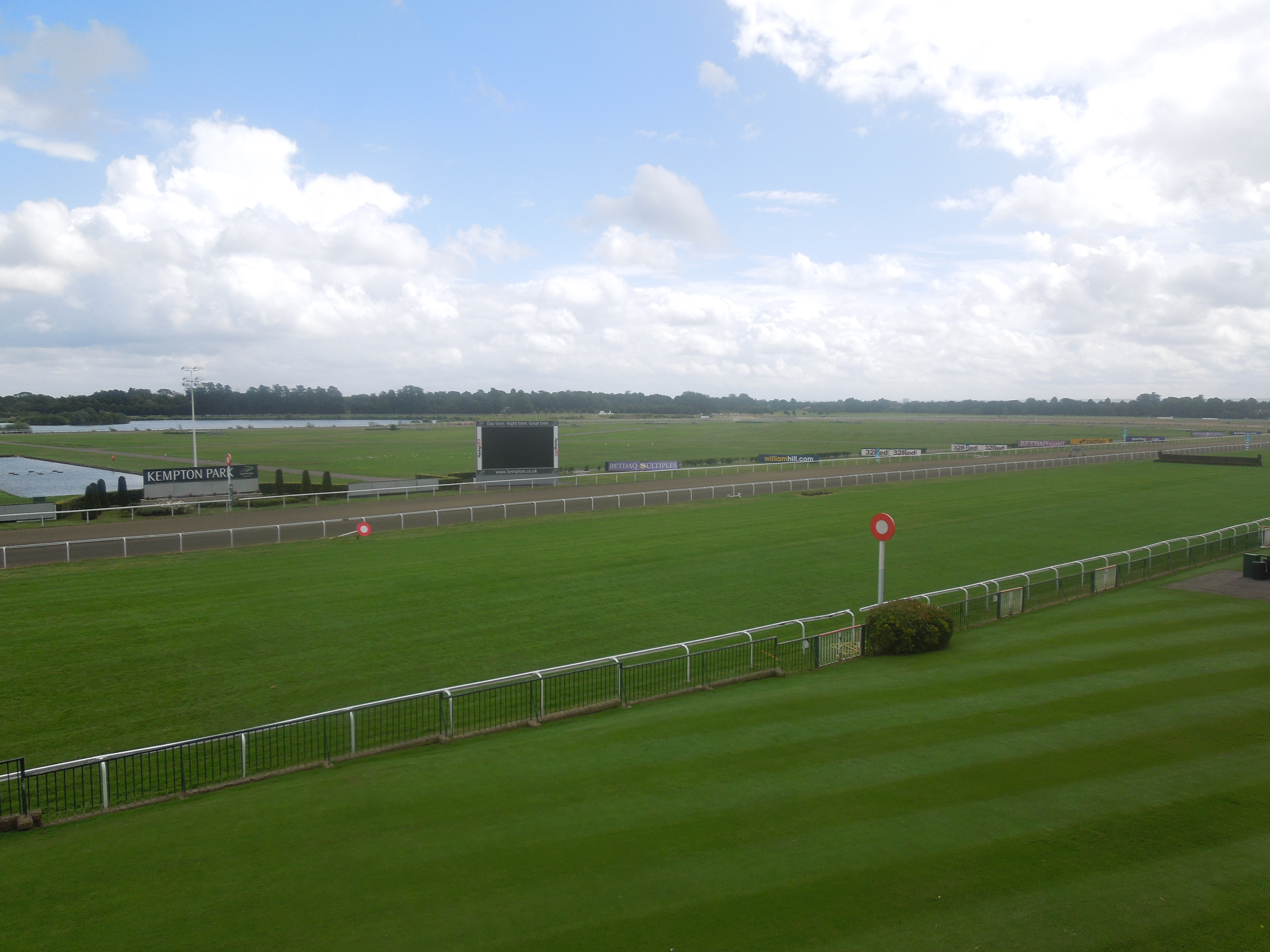
The winning post with the lake in the background

Kempton Park Racecourse is a horse racing track together with a licensed entertainment and conference venue in Sunbury-on-Thames, Surrey, England, on the border with Greater London; it is 13 miles west of Charing Cross in central London. The site has 210 acres (85 hectares) of flat grassland surrounded by woodland with two lakes in its centre. Its entrance borders Kempton Park railway station which was created for racegoers on a branch line from London Waterloo, via Clapham Junction.

It has adjoining inner and outer courses for flat and National Hunt racing. Among its races, the King George VI Chase takes place on Boxing Day, a Grade 1 National Hunt chase which is open to horses aged four years or older.

== History ==
The racecourse was the idea of 19th-century businessman and Conservative Party agent S. H. Hyde, who was enjoying a carriage drive in the country with his wife in June 1870 when he came across Kempton Manor and Park for sale. Hyde leased the grounds as tenant in 1872 and six years later in July 1878 Kempton opened as a racecourse. This was the feudal lord's demesne of a manor recorded in the Domesday Book and has had at least four variant names; though early Victorian gateposts exist, no buildings of the manor house remain.

For many years Kempton's Easter meeting (Saturday and Monday) was one of its highlights of the year, with the Roseberry Stakes (over the 1m 2f of the Jubilee course) and the 2,000 Guineas Trial on the first day, followed by the Queen's Prize over 2m, plus the 1,000 Guineas Trial on the Monday.

The site briefly closed (2 May 2005 – 25 March 2006) to reopen with a new all-weather polytrack (synthetic material) main track and floodlighting to enable racing at all light levels and in all but the most severe bad weather.

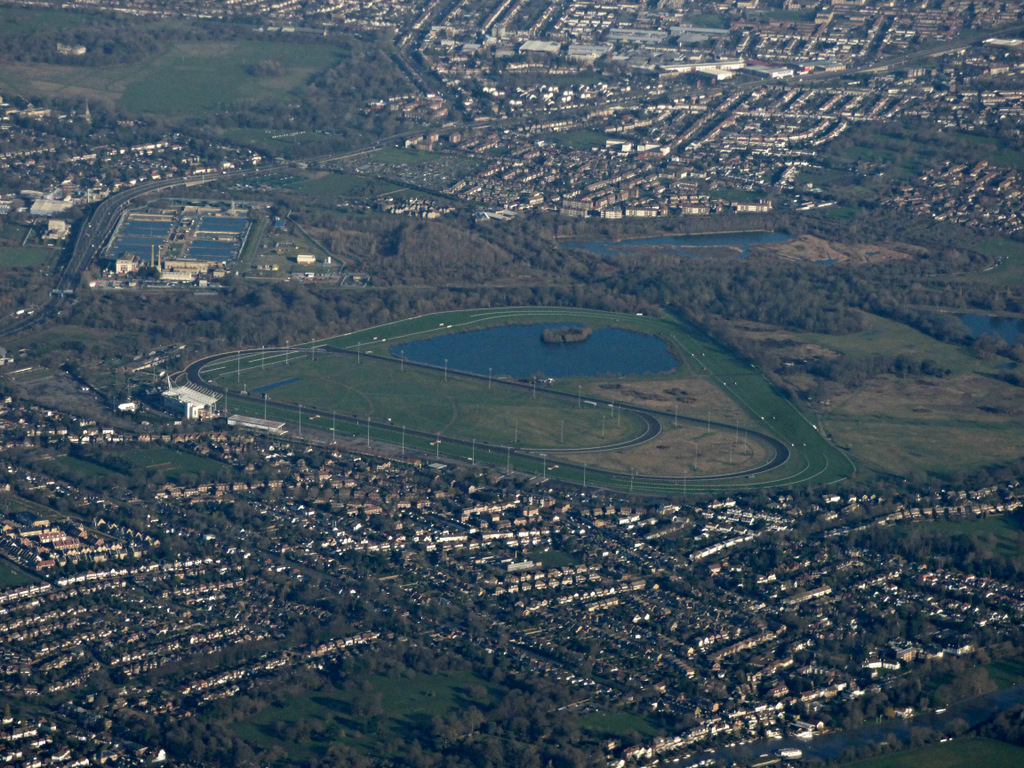
The racecourse from the air

Flat racing since 2006 has been run on the synthetic track, so the historic "Jubilee Course", a mile-long spur that joined the main track by the home bend, used for the "Jubilee Handicap" which parred the Cambridgeshire and the Stewards' Cup in seniority, was abandoned. It is now overgrown for racing; however, it joins the outskirts of the park as part of the green belt.

The old flat course comprised: a right-handed triangular course of about 1m 5f; a straight six-furlong course that intersected the back straight of the triangular course; and the 1m 2f Jubilee course, which joined the triangular course at the home turn. Races over a mile were run on the Jubilee course or on the triangular course.

John Rickman described the Jubilee course as "two straight stretches joined by a right hand bend. The race (the Jubilee Handicap) is usually run in two sprints, from the start to the Jubilee bend and thence to the winning post. On the whole it may be considered a fairly easy 10 furlongs because it is slightly downhill from the start for the first 400 yards. Then the turn gives a slight breather."

The National Hunt course was inside the triangle of the old flat course, and is a little over 1m 4f round, with nine fences. Until the configuration of the steeplechase course was changed several years ago, there were ten fences, with a very long run-in of 350 yards, for there were only two fences in the home straight rather than the present three, and a run-in of 220 yards.

On 10 January 2017, the Jockey Club announced the closure of the 230-acre site by 2021 for a total of £500 million investment programme over a 10-year period that was submitted for consideration following the local authority's 'Call for Sites' to address unmet local housing needs. The plan includes the move of some important jumps races like the King George VI Chase and Christmas Hurdle to the Sandown Park Racecourse with the other jumps fixtures to be spread around other Jockey Club-owned racecourses throughout the country, while the all-weather track to be replaced by a new artificial track to be built at Newmarket. In February 2020, however, the Jockey Club announced revised plans for a limited development of the site for housing that would allow racing to continue at Kempton Park for the foreseeable future.

== Top three events ==
Kempton Park stages National Hunt racing (with fences) and flat racing, with the most famous race being the King George VI Chase held every Boxing Day, a prestigious Grade 1 race. The Kauto Star Novices' Chase (formerly the Feltham Novices' Chase) also takes place on Boxing Day, a Grade 1 race. With similar challenges, past winners of the Kauto Star Novices' Chase and of the King George VI Chase include Kauto Star and Long Run; the following day is the Desert Orchid Chase, a Grade 2 race. On approximately the last weekend of February Kempton Park hosts the Coral Trophy Handicap Chase and in early September the course stages the September Stakes race day.

== Non-racing events and facilities ==
In addition to racing, the site is home to a weekly market on Thursdays, holds an antiques market on the second and last Tuesday of every month and seasonal wedding fairs. Reception areas and two restaurants can be booked for private hospitality or celebrations. Boxes are used for meetings and race days.

== Location filming ==
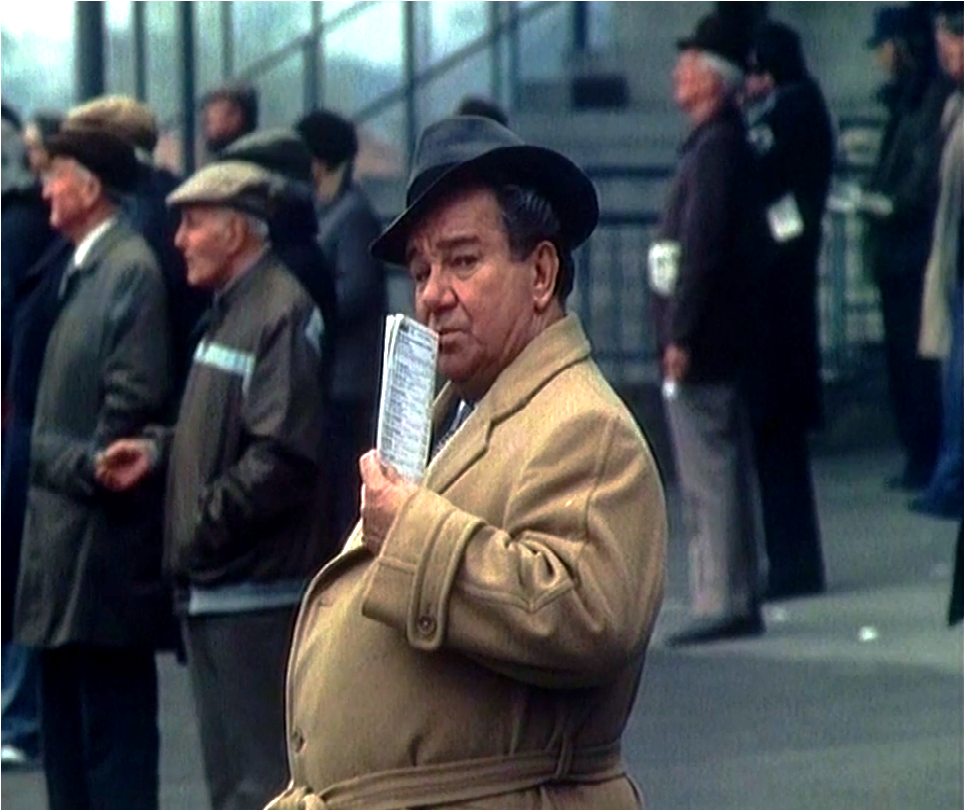
A scene from The Optimist television series, which was partially filmed at Kempton Park.

Kempton Park is used and marketed as a location for filming purposes. The 1956 movie Dry Rot was partially filmed at the course; and the 1985 television programme The Optimist was also partially shot at Kempton.

== Landscape ==
Upper tiers of the grandstand and boxes have views toward Sandown Park's Esher and Oxshott ridge and the North Downs range of hills. Woodland and parkland forms the backdrop from the grandstand.

Lake

The horse Blue Warrior strayed and fell into Kempton Park's centre-course lake having jumped before the start of the 19.20 on 14 January 2009. The rescue operation to get the horse out of the lake caused the race to be delayed by 15 minutes, with the horse rescued and sustaining a minor cut to his leg.

== Racecourse details ==
- All-weather Opened in March 2006, this floodlit polytrack synthetic course is a right-handed oval of 8 or 10 furlongs, depending on whether the inner or outer bend is used.
- National Hunt Triangular circuit 1m5f, practically flat, with 220-yard run-in.

== Notable races ==
| Month | DOW | Race Name | Type | Grade | Distance | Age/Sex |
|---|---|---|---|---|---|---|
| January | Saturday | Silviniaco Conti Chase | Chase | Grade 2 | 2m 4½f | 5yo+ |
| January | Saturday | Lanzarote Hurdle | Hurdle | Premier Handicap | 2m 5f | 4yo+ |
| February | Saturday | Pendil Novices' Chase | Chase | Grade 2 | 2m 4½f | 5yo+ |
| February | Saturday | Adonis Juvenile Hurdle | Hurdle | Grade 2 | 2m | 4yo |
| February | Saturday | Dovecote Novices' Hurdle | Hurdle | Grade 2 | 2m | 4yo+ |
| February | Saturday | Ladbrokes Trophy Handicap Chase | Chase | Premier Handicap | 3m | 5yo+ |
| February | Wednesday | European Road to the Kentucky Derby Conditions Stakes | AW Flat | Conditions | 1m | 3yo |
| March/April | Saturday | Rosebery Stakes | AW Flat | Handicap | 1m 3f | 4yo+ |
| March/April | Saturday | Snowdrop Fillies' Stakes | AW Flat | Listed | 1m | 4yo+ f |
| March/April | Easter Monday | Magnolia Stakes | AW Flat | Listed | 1m 2f | 4yo+ |
| September | Saturday | September Stakes | AW Flat | Group 3 | 1m 4f | 3yo+ |
| September | Saturday | Sirenia Stakes | AW Flat | Group 3 | 6f | 2yo |
| October | Sunday | Panoramic Hurdle | Hurdle | Listed | 2m | 4yo+ |
| November | Wednesday | Floodlit Stakes | AW Flat | Listed | 1m 4f | 3yo+ |
| November | Monday | Lilies Mares' Hurdle | Hurdle | Listed | 2m 5f | 4yo+ m |
| December | Wednesday | Hyde Stakes | AW Flat | Listed | 1m | 3yo+ |
| December | Wednesday | Wild Flower Stakes | AW Flat | Listed | 1m 4f | 3yo+ |
| December | Boxing Day | Wayward Lad Novices' Chase | Chase | Grade 2 | 2m | 4yo+ |
| December | Boxing Day | Christmas Hurdle | Hurdle | Grade 1 | 2m | 4yo+ |
| December | Boxing Day | King George VI Chase | Chase | Grade 1 | 3m | 4yo+ |
| December | 27th | Kauto Star Novices' Chase | Chase | Grade 1 | 3m | 4yo+ |
| December | 27th | Desert Orchid Chase | Chase | Grade 2 | 2m | 4yo+ |

== Transport ==
The racecourse has a purpose-built railway station, on the London Waterloo to Shepperton line.

For racegoers not travelling via the capital, and including the direct Thameslink from Bedford to Brighton, a junction station on this short line is at Clapham Junction and for services on lines from Reading and Windsor to Waterloo, a change can be made at Twickenham followed by nearby Teddington.

The A308 passes by the racecourse and so does the A316 that becomes the M3 motorway. Free parking is available for visitors.
