= Upper Halliford railway station =

Railway station in Surrey, England

Upper Halliford
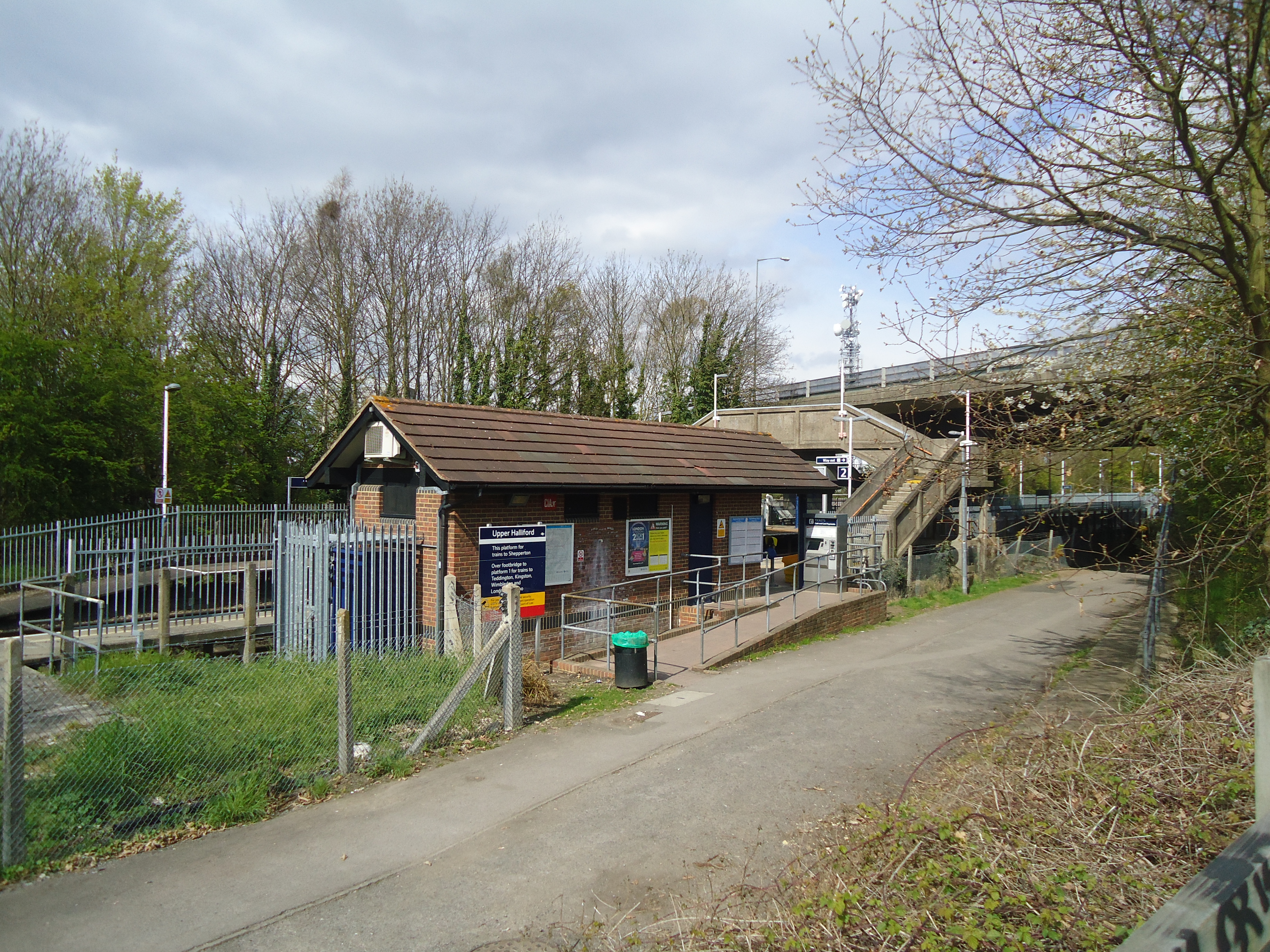

General information
- Location: Upper Halliford, Spelthorne; England
- Coordinates: 51°24′47″N 0°25′52″W
- Grid reference: TQ092694
- Managed by: South Western Railway
- Platforms: 2

Other information
- Station code: UPH
- Classification: DfT category E

History
- Opened: 1 May 1944

Passengers
- 2020/21: ▼24,554
- 2021/22: ▲48,714
- 2022/23: ▲76,514
- 2023/24: ▲93,410
- 2024/25: ▲0.106 million
Location
Notes
- Passenger statistics from the Office of Rail and Road

Upper Halliford railway station serves the village of Upper Halliford in Surrey, England. It is 17 miles 34 chains (28.0 km) down the line from London Waterloo.

The station and all trains serving it are operated by South Western Railway.

== History ==
Upper Halliford Halt was opened on 1 May 1944 by Southern for the Windmill Road industrial zone which then had a wartime factory of the British Thermostat Company, manufacturing munitions. The second platform was opened on 6 May 1946.

== Station layout ==
The platforms are linked by a concrete footbridge. There is no staffed ticket office, just ticket machines.

Platform 2, the down platform, with services towards Shepperton, was rebuilt in November 2021.

There is footpath access from the residential end of Upper Halliford Road as well as two sloping paths from the west side of the Upper Halliford Road bridge. There is also a footpath giving access to the north side of Nursery Road.

== Services ==
All services at Upper Halliford are operated by South Western Railway.

The typical off-peak service in trains per hour is:

- 2 tph to London Waterloo via Wimbledon
- 2 tph to Shepperton

During the peak hours, the station is served by four morning services to London Waterloo that run via Richmond instead of Wimbledon as well as two evening services from London Waterloo via the same route.

On Sundays, the service is reduced to hourly in each direction.

Preceding station	National Rail	Following station
Sunbury	South Western Railway Shepperton Branch Line	Shepperton
