= Shepperton branch line =

Railway line in southeast England

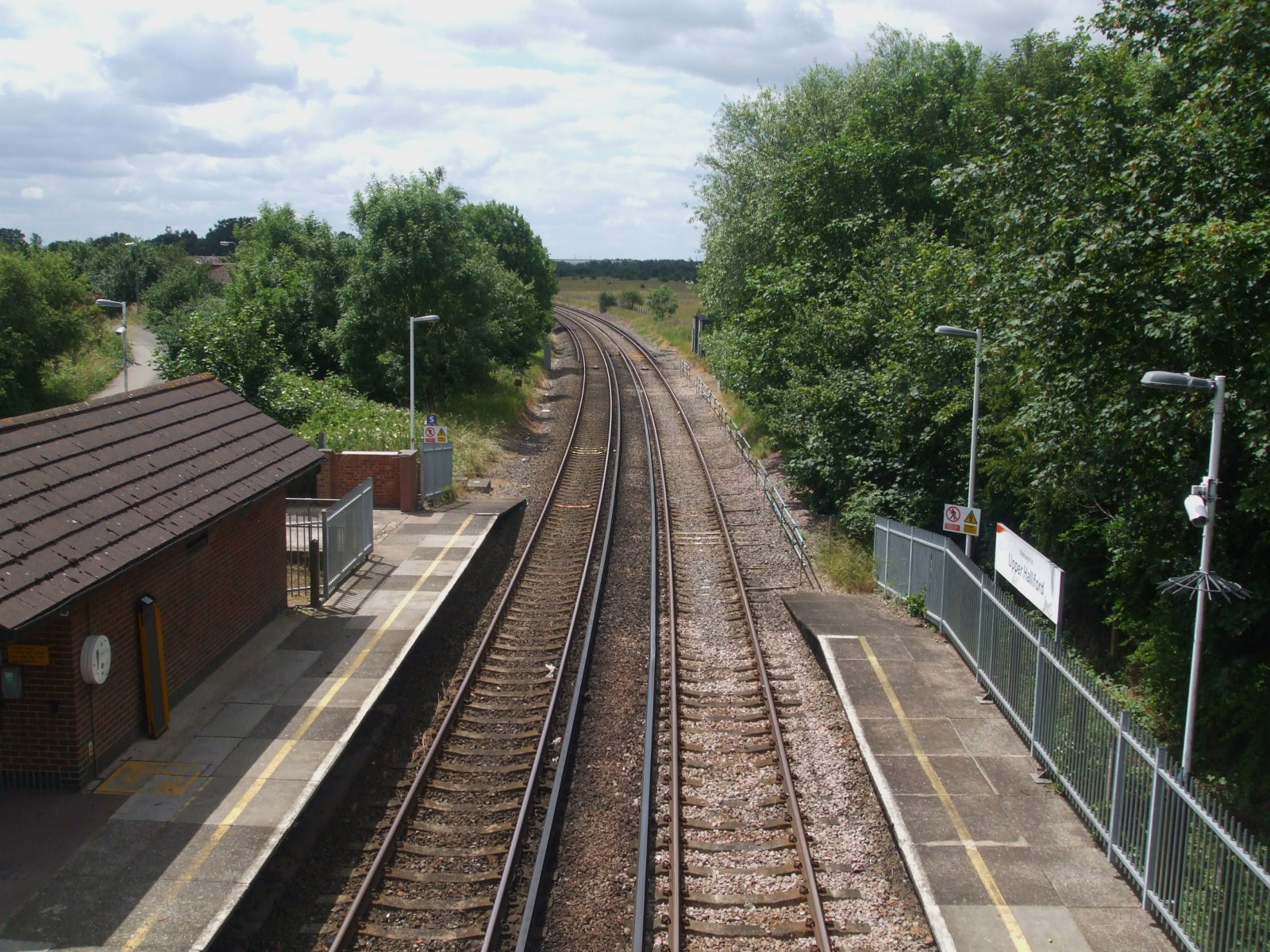
- Looking southwestwards towards Shepperton from Upper Halliford station

Overview
- Status: Operational
- Owner: Network Rail
- Locale: Greater London; South East England
- Termini: London Waterloo; Shepperton
- Stations: 6

Service
- Type: Heavy rail
- System: National Rail
- Operator: South Western Railway
- Rolling stock: Class 450; Class 458; Class 701

History
- Opened: 1 November 1864

Technical
- Number of tracks: 2
- Track gauge: 1,435 mm (4 ft 8 1/2 in) standard gauge
- Electrification: Third rail, 750 V DC
- Operating speed: 60 mph (97 km/h)
Route map
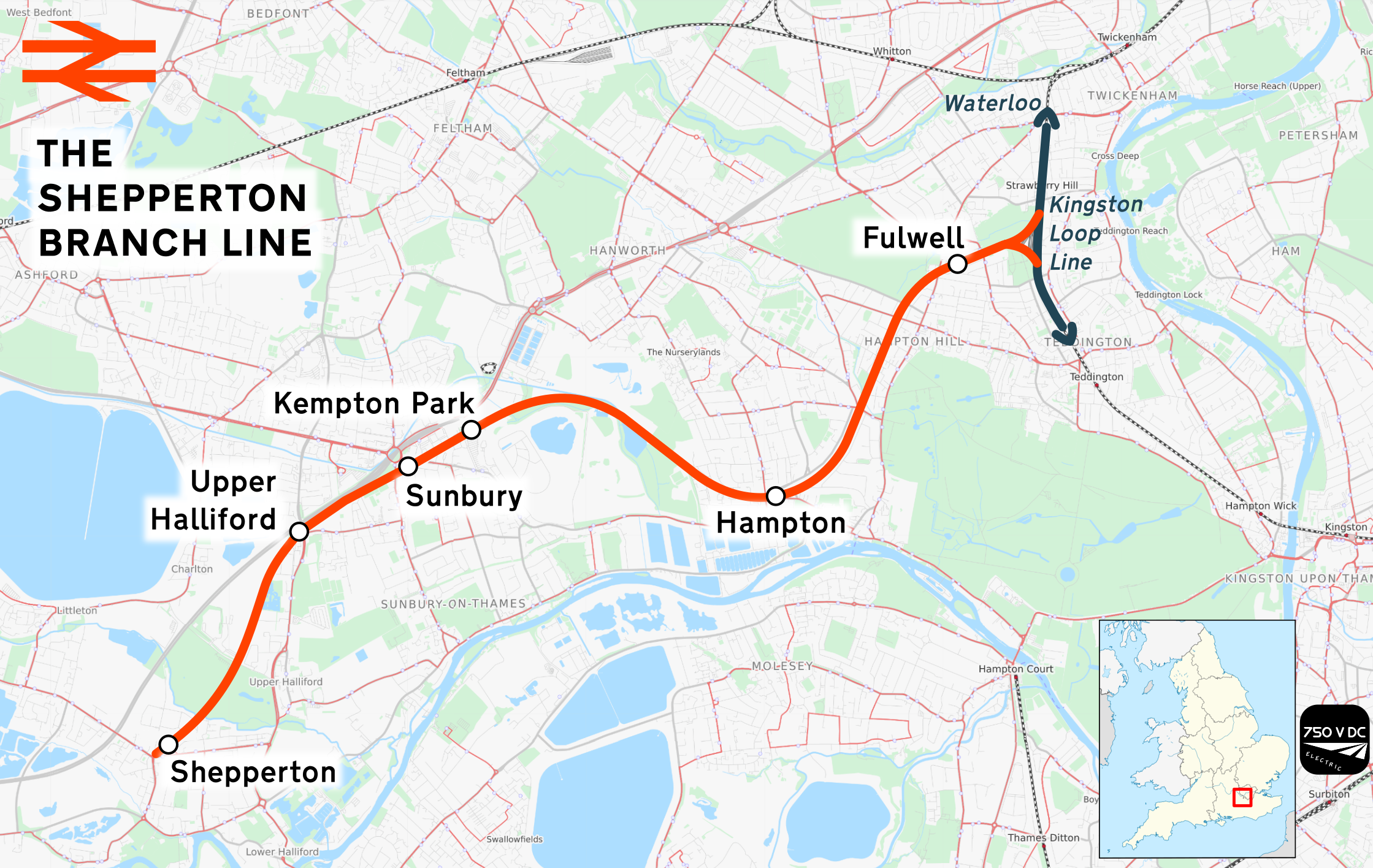

The Shepperton branch line is a 6-mile-51-ch (10.7 km) railway branch line in Surrey and Greater London, England. It runs from its western terminus at Shepperton to a triangular junction with the Kingston loop line east of Fulwell. There are intermediate stations at Upper Halliford, Sunbury, Kempton Park, and Hampton. All six stations are managed by South Western Railway, which operates all passenger trains. Most services run between Shepperton and London Waterloo via Kingston, but during peak periods some run via Twickenham.

The line was constructed by the Thames Valley Railway company and opened in November 1864. It became part of the London and South Western Railway (LSWR) the following year. The LSWR was responsible for double tracking and electrifying the line using the 750 V DC third-rail system. The replacement of the signalling was completed in June 2019 and train movements have been controlled from Basingstoke rail operating centre since April 2021. The Shepperton branch line is proposed for incorporation into Crossrail 2.

== Infrastructure and services ==
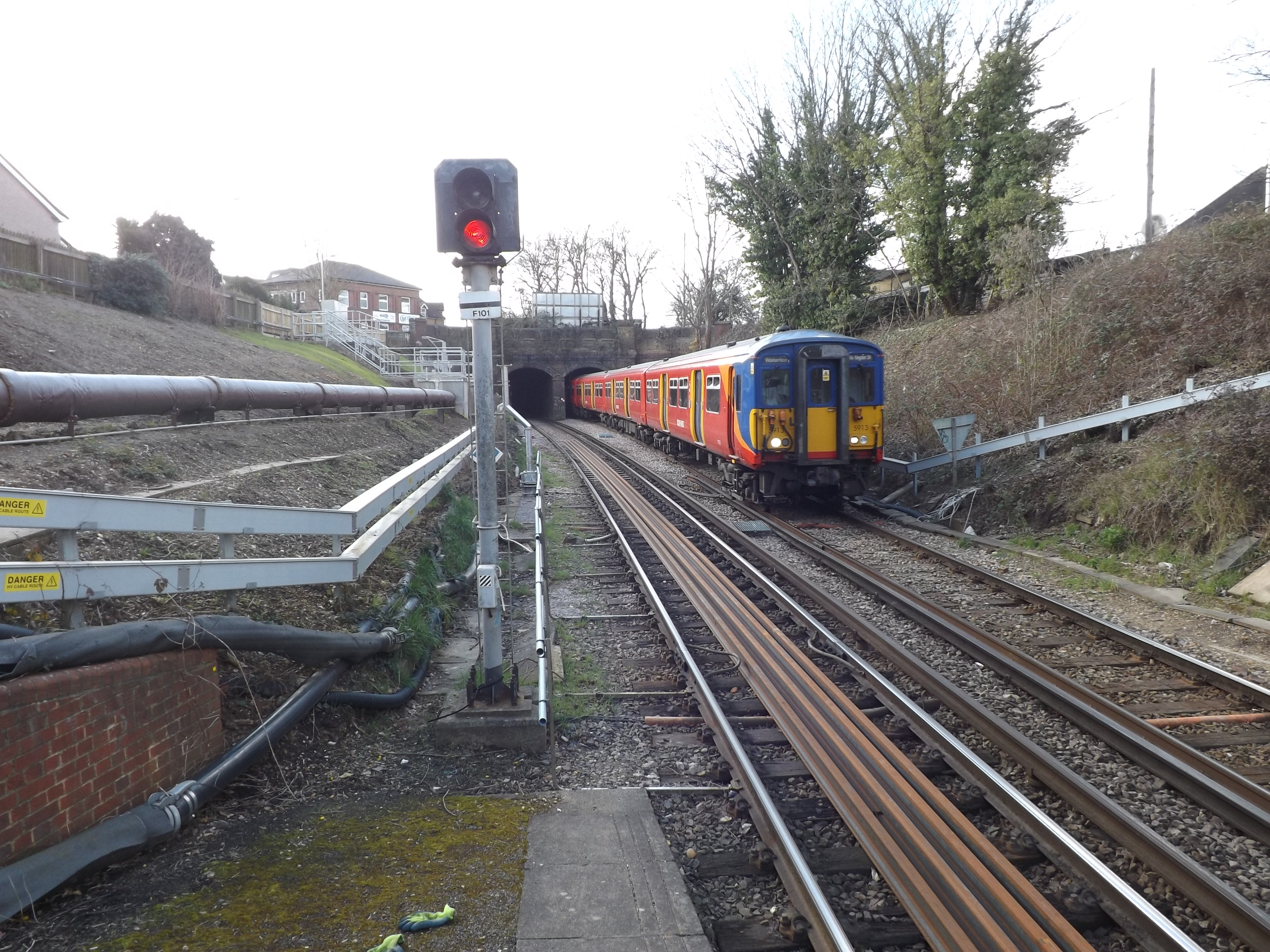
A Class 455 unit emerging from Fulwell Tunnel and entering Fulwell station

The Shepperton branch line is a railway line in Surrey and Greater London, England. It runs for 6 miles 51 ch (10.7 km) from its terminus at Shepperton station to an at-grade triangular junction with the Kingston loop line around 12.5 mi (20.1 km) down the line from London Waterloo. The maximum speed permitted on the branch is 60 mph (97 km/h). The line is electrified using the 750 V DC third-rail system and, with the exception of Shepperton station, the line is double tracked throughout. Signalling is controlled by Basingstoke rail operating centre and track circuit block is in operation. There is one level crossing on the line, immediately to the west of Hampton station, and a 57 yd (52 m) tunnel, immediately to the west of Fulwell station. (Note: The cutting and tunnel at Fulwell pass through water-bearing gravels and have a history of flooding. Fulwell Tunnel is thought to have been built using the cut-and-cover method.) The artificial Longford River passes over the line in an aqueduct at Hampton Hill.

The six stations on the branch are managed by South Western Railway, which operates all services. Shepperton has one operational platform, but the other five stations have two platforms each. (Note: Platform 1 at Hampton station is the shortest on the line with a length of 204 m (669 ft).) The buffer stop at Shepperton is 18 miles 73 ch (30.4 km) down the line from London Waterloo, when measured via Twickenham. The off-peak service pattern is two trains per hour in each direction calling at all stations (except Earlsfield) between Shepperton and London Waterloo via Kingston. In the peak periods, there are additional services to Waterloo via Twickenham that do not call at Kempton Park. Off-peak trains from Shepperton typically reach New Malden on the South West Main Line in around 30 minutes and reach London Waterloo from Shepperton in around 55 minutes. Hampton and Fulwell stations are in Zone 6, but the other four stations on the branch are outside the London fare zones.

Stations on the Shepperton branch line (ordered from east to west)
Station	Distance from Waterloo via Twickenham	Number of platforms	Opening date	Original name	Ref.
Fulwell	12 mi 75 ch (20.8 km)	2	1 November 1864		
Hampton	14 mi 47 ch (23.5 km)	2	1 November 1864		
Kempton Park	16 mi 28 ch (26.3 km)	2	18 July 1878	Sunbury Racecourse	
Sunbury	16 mi 64 ch (27.0 km)	2	1 November 1864		
Upper Halliford	17 mi 34 ch (28.0 km)	2	1 May 1944	Upper Halliford Halt	
Shepperton	18 mi 73 ch (30.4 km)	1	1 November 1864		

== History ==
=== Proposals and authorisation ===
A railway line serving Shepperton and Sunbury was first proposed in 1861. At the time, the area was rural and the main industry was agriculture. The main motivation for the scheme was to provide a reliable route to London, avoiding Walton Bridge, which had collapsed in 1859 and had not yet been repaired. The Metropolitan and Thames Valley Railway (M&TVR) company was formed and issued its first shares in December 1861. Among the provisional directors of the company were: William Schaw Lindsay, the MP for Sunderland; Sir William Clay; Sir James Duke; Frederick Smith, colonel commandant of the Royal Engineers.

The initial proposal was for a 14 mi (23 km) line linking Shepperton and Sunbury to the Great Western Main Line near Ealing. The western terminus would have been on the north side of the River Thames at Chertsey and the route would also have served Twickenham, Richmond and Isleworth. It would have run along part of the Brentford branch line, which had opened in 1859, and there would also have been spur to Walton Bridge. (Note: The proposal to create a spur from the Shepperton branch line to Walton Bridge had been dropped by the start of 1862.) The line was to have been worked by both the Great Western Railway (GWR) and the London and South Western Railway (LSWR), and was to be laid with dual gauge, meaning that it could accommodate the two companies' trains.

The original intention of the promoters was to work with the GWR to raise capital to finance construction. Instead, the GWR offered to run trains on the line in exchange for half of the gross receipts and to provide assistance in obtaining parliamentary authorisation. The directors of the M&TVR rejected the GWR's offer in March 1862 and approached the LSWR instead. The scope of the initial proposal was dramatically reduced, with the removal of the eastern half of the line. Instead, the easternmost point on the branch would be a junction with LSWR line to Kingston (later the Kingston loop line) around 1.5 mi (2.4 km) south of Twickenham. The promoters dropped the word "Metropolitan" from the company name, which became the "Thames Valley Railway" (TVR). Additionally, the line was to be built to standard gauge only. Many supporters of the M&TVR were unhappy with the reduced scope of the line and refused to continue their association with the renamed company.

Thames Valley Railway Act 1862
- Act of Parliament
- Parliament of the United Kingdom
- Long title: An Act for making Railways from the London and South-western Railway to Hampton and Shepperton in the County of Middlesex.
- Citation: 25 & 26 Vict. c. clii

Dates
- Royal assent: 17 July 1862

Text of statute as originally enacted

A preliminary agreement was made with the LSWR on 1 May 1862. The LSWR was to run train services on the line in exchange for paying the TVR 50% of its gross receipts in addition to a 4% return on the original capital, up to £110,000. Two further alterations to the proposed line took place in mid-1862. Firstly, local opposition from residents forced a diversion to avoid the settlement of Sunbury. The diversion required gradients of up to 1 in 100 to enable it to climb away from the Thames. Secondly, the stretch of line from Shepperton to Chertsey was not included in the original act of Parliament, although the stated intention of the TVR directors was to build this section at a later date. Construction of the Shepperton branch line was authorised on 17 July 1862 in the Thames Valley Railway Act 1862 (25 & 26 Vict. c. clii).

=== Construction and opening ===
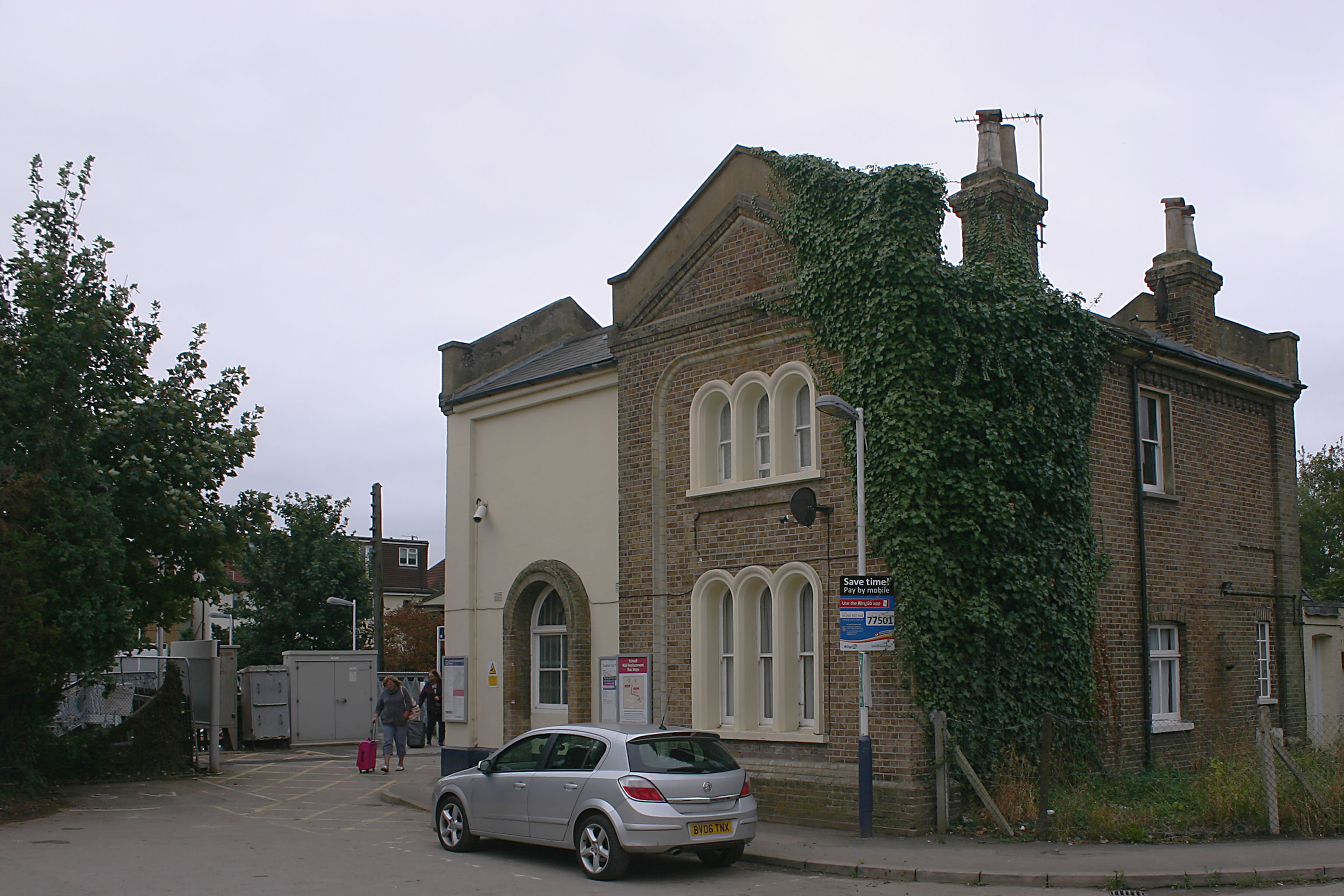
Fulwell retains its original station building

The TVR appointed Joseph Quick and Julian Horne Johne as engineers, and John Aird as the contractor to build the railway. Under the terms of the act of Parliament, only a single track was laid, but the formation was sufficiently wide to allow a second track to be added at a later date. Four stations were constructed (Shepperton, Sunbury, Hampton and Fulwell) all of which except Fullwell were provided with small goods yards. The station buildings were designed in the Italiante villa style using yellow London stock bricks. Trains were able to pass at Shepperton, Sunbury, Hampton and at the junction with the Kingston branch line. The single line sections were to be controlled by train staff.

Aird received £110,000 for constructing the line, the majority of which was paid in shares. He was also given some surplus land in the Sunbury area. He offered to extend the line westwards from Shepperton, which had been laid out as a through station with two platforms. Although a parliamentary notice was drafted, opposition from the LSWR meant that the plans for the Shepperton-Chertsey section were dropped in December 1864.

The Shepperton branch line opened on 1 November 1864, with the first train leaving the western terminus at 7:40 am and arriving at London Waterloo around an hour later. The initial service was eight trains in each direction per day Monday-Saturday (at intervals of roughly two hours) and four trains per day on Sundays. The opening of the branch stimulated housebuilding in the area. By mid-1865, the Hampton Hill Estate Company was starting to construct around 250 villas on the north side of the line and, in 1872, the 480-acre (190 ha) Fulwell Estate was offered for development. By 1887, there were 17 trains per day on weekdays, with a typical journey time from Shepperton to Waterloo of 55 minutes.

=== Under LSWR ownership ===
Amalgamation of the TVR and LSWR was proposed in November 1864 and the merger was authorised the South-western Railway (General) Act 1865 (28 & 29 Vict. c. ccciv) on 5 July the following year. The owners of the TVR accepted a total of £100,910 in 4 1/2 per cent preference stock. The LSWR doubled the line between Thames Valley Junction (the junction with the Kingston branch line) and Fulwell station c. 1867. Double track was extended westwards to Sunbury by July 1878 and to Shepperton by the end of that year.

Kempton Park Racecourse opened on 18 July 1878. Although the LSWR was initially reluctant to serve the venue with a dedicated station, a private platform opened to the north of the course that year, funded by the Kempton Park Racing Club. A second platform opened in 1897 and a third in 1890. Initially, Kempton Park station was only available for use by members of the racing club and, until 1890, most racegoers used Sunbury station, around 600 m (660 yd) to the west.

From 1894, special raceday trains to and from London were routed via Kingston. West of Sunbury, the Shepperton branch was operated as a single-line, allowing rolling stock for the specials to be stabled on the up line, whilst keeping the down line free for regular scheduled services. Special raceday trains ceased in the early 1960s and the third platform at Kempton Park station was closed in 1964.

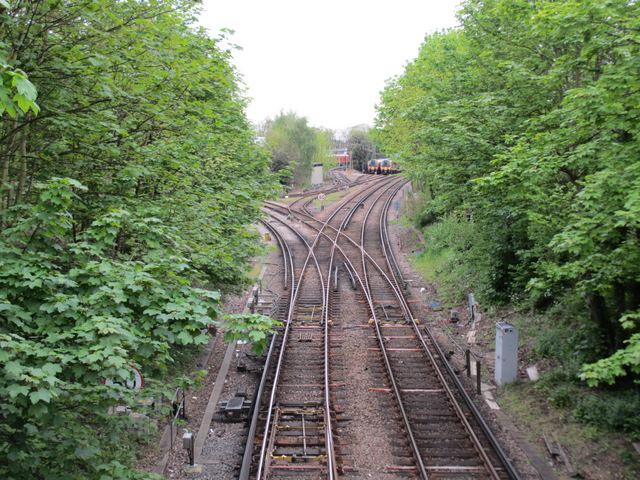
Looking north towards Shacklegate Junction, which opened in 1894. The diverging line to the left is for Shepperton via Fulwell Junction and the line curving to the right leads to Twickenham. The Class 450 units are stabled at Strawberry Hill train maintenance depot, which opened in 1897.

On 1 July 1894, the LSWR opened a new section of track, enabling trains from Fulwell to reach Twickenham without the need for reversal. The 24-chain (480 m) curve created a triangular junction between the Shepperton branch and the Kingston loop line, allowing access to the South Western Main Line via the existing junction at New Malden. Initially, the new link was used primarily by goods trains, but raceday specials also used the line from 1894. Regular passenger services began running over the line on 1 June 1901. Strawberry Hill train maintenance depot, inside the triangle created by the new curve, opened in 1897.

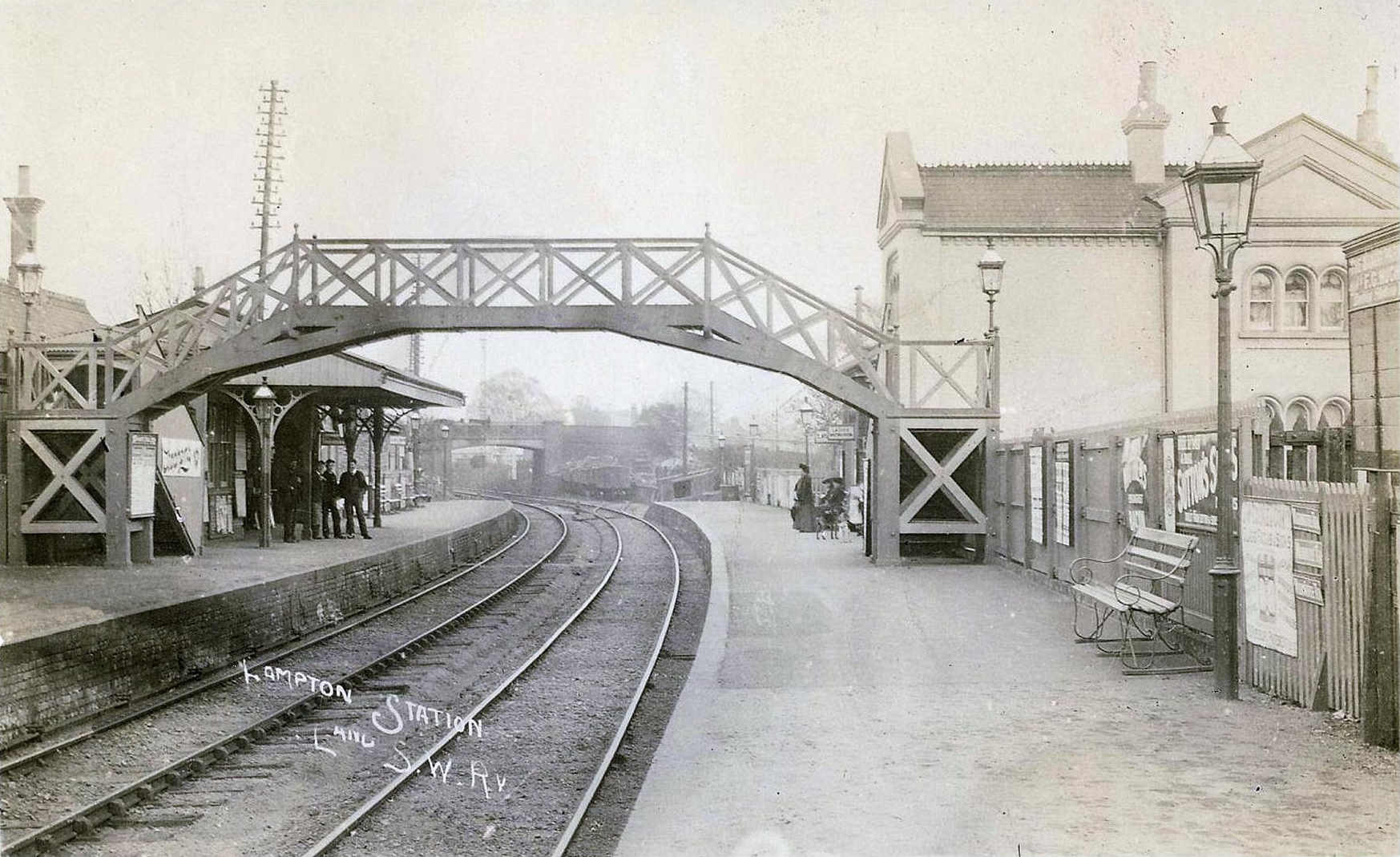
Hampton station in 1912, two years before the line was electrified. The wooden footbridge was replaced by a concrete structure in the 1930s.

The Shepperton branch line was included in the first phase of the LSWR suburban electrification programme. Electric services began on 30 January 1916. At the same time, the timetable was rewritten to reroute most off-peak services to Waterloo via Kingston, running at 30-minute intervals. During peak hours, additional steam-hauled services ran via Twickenham. Stabling at Shepperton was improved in 1925 with the installation of an electrified siding and cleaning stage. Electrification stimulated further development in the area served by the line, including the construction of new housing estates at Fulwell in the 1920s and 1930s.

Under the terms of the Railways Act 1921, the LSWR became part of the Southern Railway on 1 January 1923.

=== Metropolitan Water Board Railway ===
In 1852, three private companies established pumping stations at Hampton to extract water from the Thames. Coal for the works was delivered by horse-and-cart and by barge from the river. The companies were taken over by the Metropolitan Water Board in June 1904. The board decided to build a 2 ft (610 mm) narrow gauge railway system with transshipment sidings alongside the Shepperton branch line between Kempton Park and Hampton stations. The 3 1/2 miles (5.6 km) system opened in 1915 and was worked by three Kerr, Stuart 0-4-2T locomotives named Hampton, Kempton and Sunbury, supplemented by fourth, named Hurst, some years later. Eventually there were about 140 tipping, hopper and other wagons in use on the railway. With the declining use of coal at the pumping stations, the railway closed in 1947.

=== Second World War and afterwards ===
During the Second World War, Kempton Park Racecourse was used as a reception camp for prisoners of war. The prisoners were transported to the racecourse station in corridor stock, hauled by Southern Railway 4-6-0 or War Department Austerity 2-8-0 locomotives. The station buildings on the up platform at Sunbury were destroyed by bombing on 29 November 1940. Upper Halliford station opened as a halt on 1 May 1944 for workers at the British Thermostat Company factory nearby. Since single-line working was in operation at the time, only one platform, on the down side, was provided. The second platform opened on 6 May 1946.

The signal boxes at Sunbury, Hampton and Shepperton closed between March 1969 and November 1974. Control of the line transferred to Feltham Signalling Centre from September of that year. A new CLASP station building at Sunbury opened in 1967.

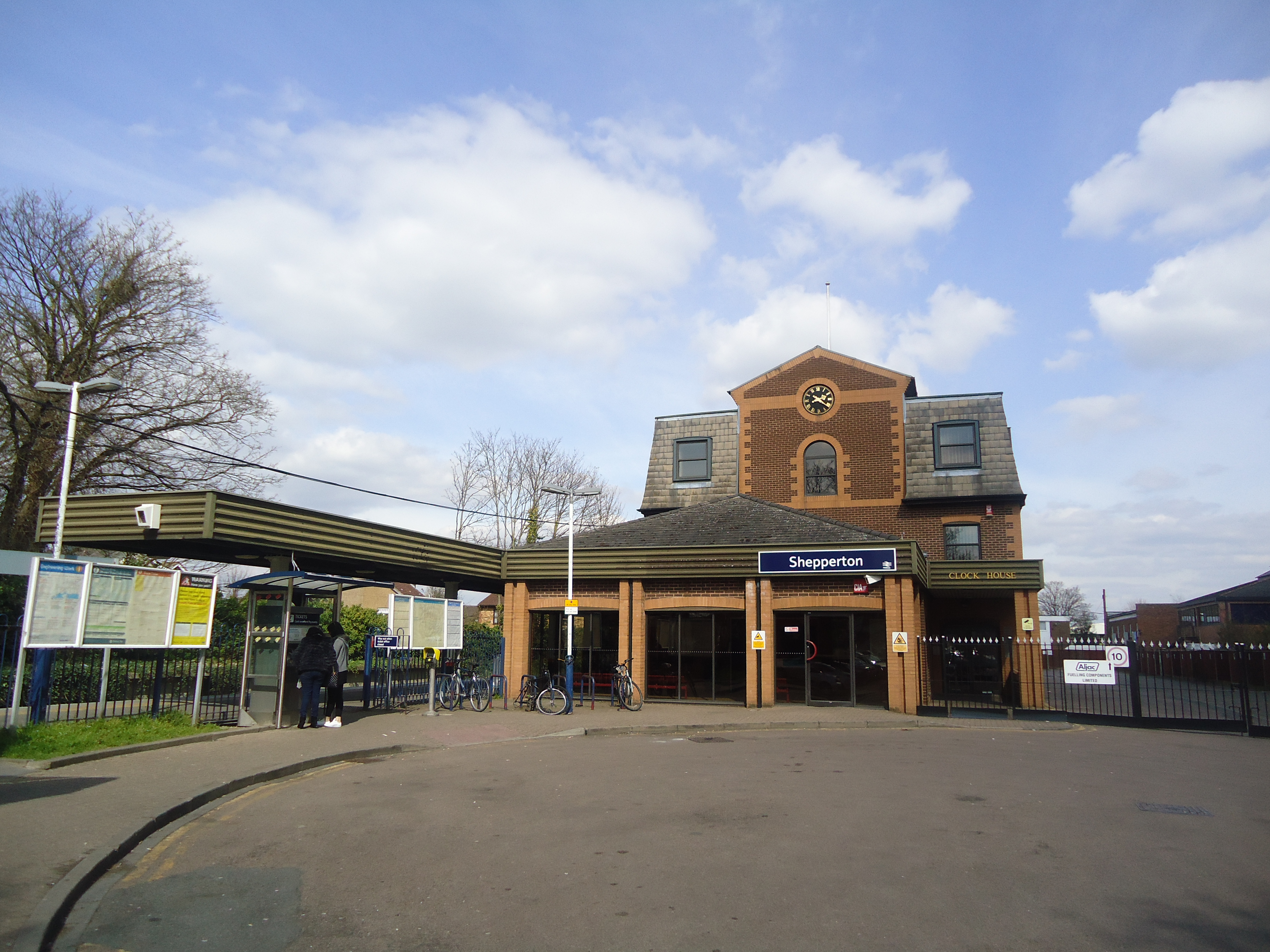
Shepperton station building dates from 1988

Class 508 units were introduced to the Shepperton branch on 7 January 1980, and Class 455 units began running on the line on 28 March 1983. As the Class 455 units began to enter squadron service, the Class 508s were progressively transferred to operate Merseyrail services in North West England. The final Class 508 units were relocated to the Liverpool area in December 1984. Shepperton station was rebuilt in 1988, with the new building incorporating offices for the publishers, Ian Allan.

In June 2019, a project to replace life-expired signalling equipment was completed. Since April 2021, train movements on the Shepperton branch line have been controlled from Basingstoke rail operating centre. Class 701 units began operating passenger services on the branch on 30 September 2024.

== Accidents and incidents ==
- 22 June 1878: A guard was struck on the head and killed by a scaffolding pole near Fulwell, whilst working a passenger service to Twickenham.
- 21 April 1982: A Class 508 unit ran through the buffer stop at Shepperton station. The accident took place at around 7:30 am and only six passengers were on board at the time.

== Proposals ==
The Shepperton branch line is proposed for incorporation into Crossrail 2.

== Bibliography ==
- Brown, David (2009). Development of the London Suburban Network and Its Trains. Southern Electric. Vol. 1. Crowthorne: Capital Transport Publishing. ISBN 978-1-85-414330-3.
- Brown, David (2010). Main Line Electrification, the War Years and British Railways. Southern Electric. Vol. 2. Crowthorne: Capital Transport Publishing. ISBN 978-1-85-414340-2.
- Grant, Donald J. (2017). Directory of the Railway Companies of Great Britain. Kibworth Beauchamp: Matador. ISBN 978-1-78-589353-7.
- Heselton, K.Y. (1994). Sunbury, Shepperton and the Thames Valley Railway. Sunbury and Shepperton Local History Society.
- Jackson, Alan A. (1999a) [1978]. London's Local Railways (2nd ed.). Harrow Weald: Capital Transport. ISBN 978-0-71-537479-5.
- Jackson, Alan A. (1999b). The Railway in Surrey. Penryn: Atlantic Transport Publishers. ISBN 978-0-90-689990-8.
- Marsden, Colin J. (2008). The DC Electrics. Hersham: Ian Allan. ISBN 978-0-86-093615-2.
- Mitchell, Vic; Smith, Keith (1990). Kingston and Hounslow loops : Including the Shepperton branch. Midhurst: Middleton Press. ISBN 978-0-90-652083-3.
- Oppitz, Leslie (1988). Surrey Railways Remembered. Newbury: Countryside Books. ISBN 978-1-85-306005-2.
- Quick, Michael (2023) [2001]. Railway Passenger Stations in Great Britain (PDF) (5.05 ed.). London: Railway and Canal Historical Society.
- Robbins, Michael (2003) [1953]. Middlesex. Chichester: Phillimore. ISBN 978-1-86-077269-6.
- Thomas, Roger J.C. (2003). "Prisoner of War Camps (1939 – 1948)". English Heritage.
- Williams, R. A. (1973). The London & South Western Railway. Vol. 2: Growth and Consolidation. Newton Abbot: David & Charles. ISBN 0-7153-5940-1.
- "Kent / Sussex / Wessex Routes Sectional Appendix" (PDF). Network Rail. 2009.
- "Delivering a better railway for a better Britain | Route Specifications: Wessex" (PDF). Network Rail. 2016.
