= Twickenham railway station =

Railway station in Greater London

Twickenham
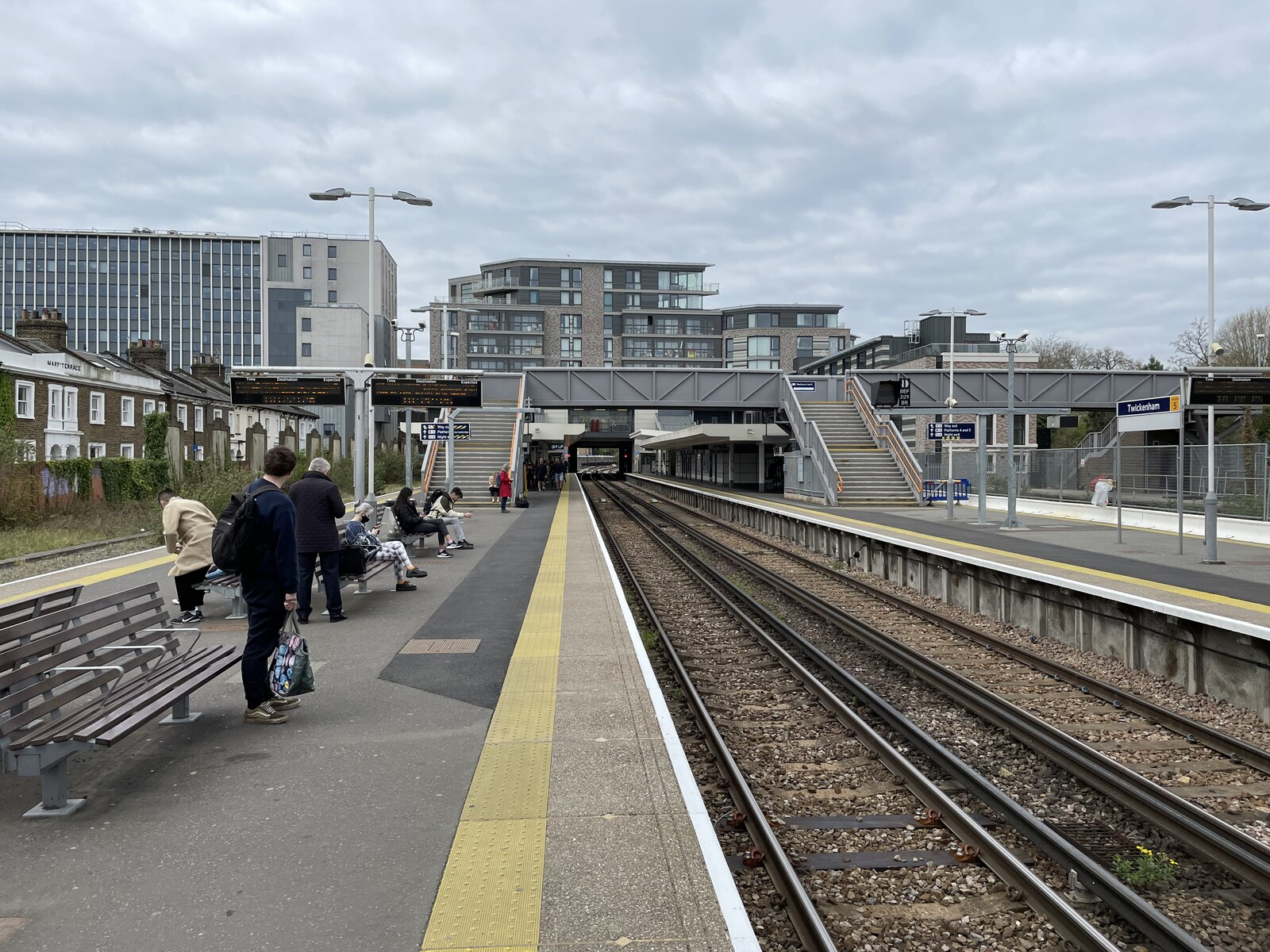
- Interactive map of Twickenham

General information
- Location: Twickenham
- Local authority: London Borough of Richmond upon Thames
- Managed by: South Western Railway
- Station code: TWI
- DfT category: C1
- Number of platforms: 4
- Accessible: Yes
- Fare zone: 5

National Rail annual entry and exit
- 2020–21: ▼0.933 million
- Interchange: ▼88,997
- 2021–22: ▲2.947 million
- Interchange: ▲0.206 million
- 2022–23: ▲4.019 million
- Interchange: ▲0.344 million
- 2023–24: ▲4.492 million
- Interchange: ▼0.242 million
- 2024–25: ▲4.972 million
- Interchange: ▲0.280 million

Key dates
- 22 August 1848: Opened
- 28 March 1954: Resited 230m east

Other information
- External links: Departures; Facilities
- Coordinates: 51.4504°N 0.3296°W

Twickenham railway station is in Twickenham in the London Borough of Richmond upon Thames, England, and is in London fare zone 5. By track it is 11 miles 22 chains (18.1 km) from London Waterloo. Only one main street abuts the station – at its west end – London Road running between a trunk road south of Twickenham Stadium and the town centre to the south including the town's public section of riverside.

The station and all trains serving it are operated by South Western Railway. Apart from Richmond Railway Bridge, it is at the heart of a long section of two tracks at grade (i.e. the level of the surrounding land) between Putney and Egham, but there are three tracks between Twickenham Station and St Margarets station, 500 metres to the east. Twickenham Station is on the Kingston and Hounslow loop lines.

The station was rebuilt with five platforms in 1954: platform 1 was a side platform and platforms 2/3 and 4/5 were island platforms. Platforms 1 and 2 are no longer in use.

== History ==
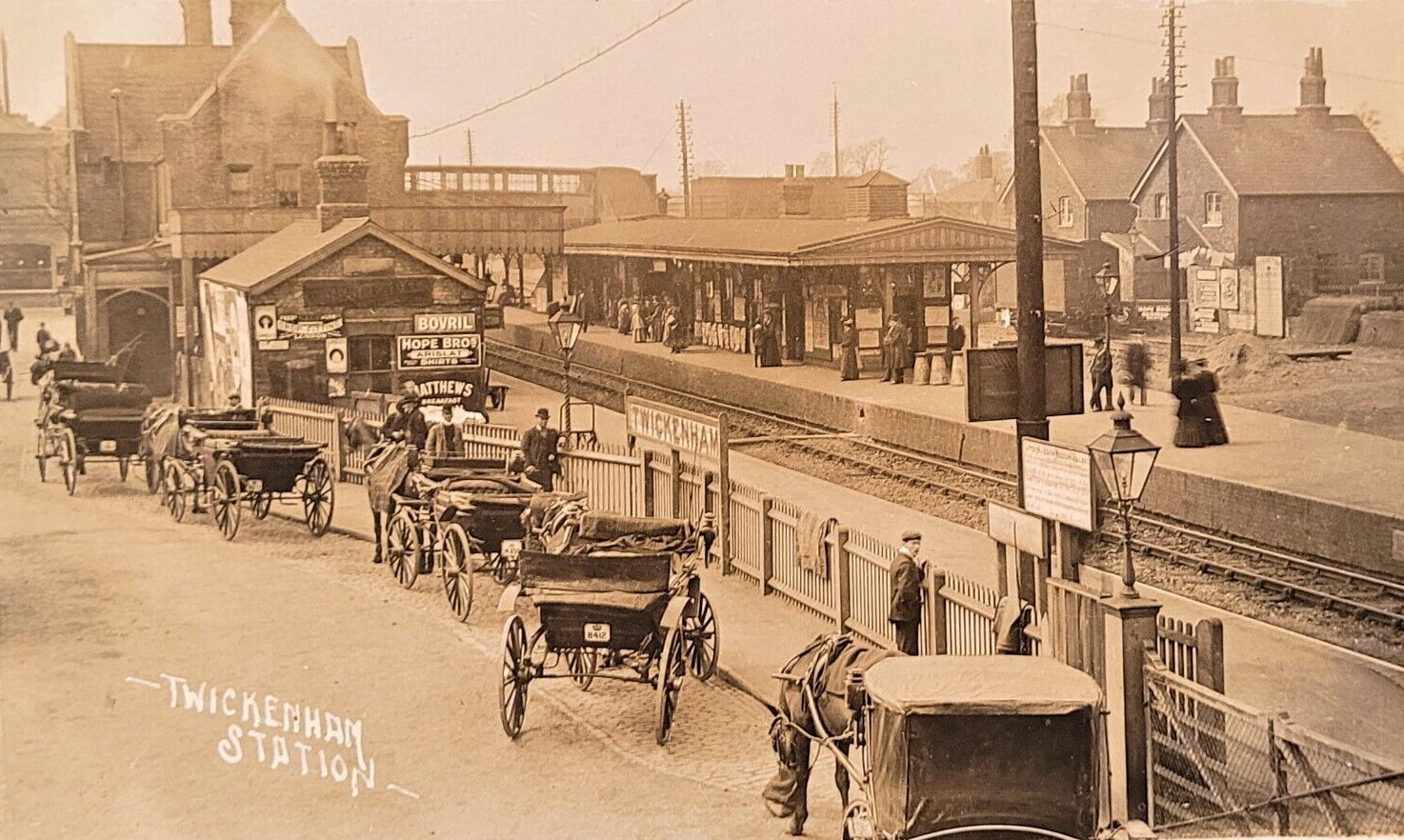
Twickenham Station in 1910

The predecessor, a neo-Gothic station, was built by the London and Windsor Railway on the west of London Road bridge, opening on 22 August 1848. The station was originally called Twickenham Junction.

Preparatory work for rebuilding by the Southern Railway in its "Southern Odeon" style on the east of London Road was halted by the outbreak of World War II, with most trackwork and the vertical edgings of the five planned through platforms in place. After the war some platforms were made level for rugby spectators' trains which were hand-flagged through the station. On 28 March 1954, a completely rebuilt station came into use with three through tracks. The two main up platforms face each other. The slower of these sees more than half of services join from a flyover to the south which coupled with the three tracks to St Margarets ensures no hold-ups needed to fast services eastbound.

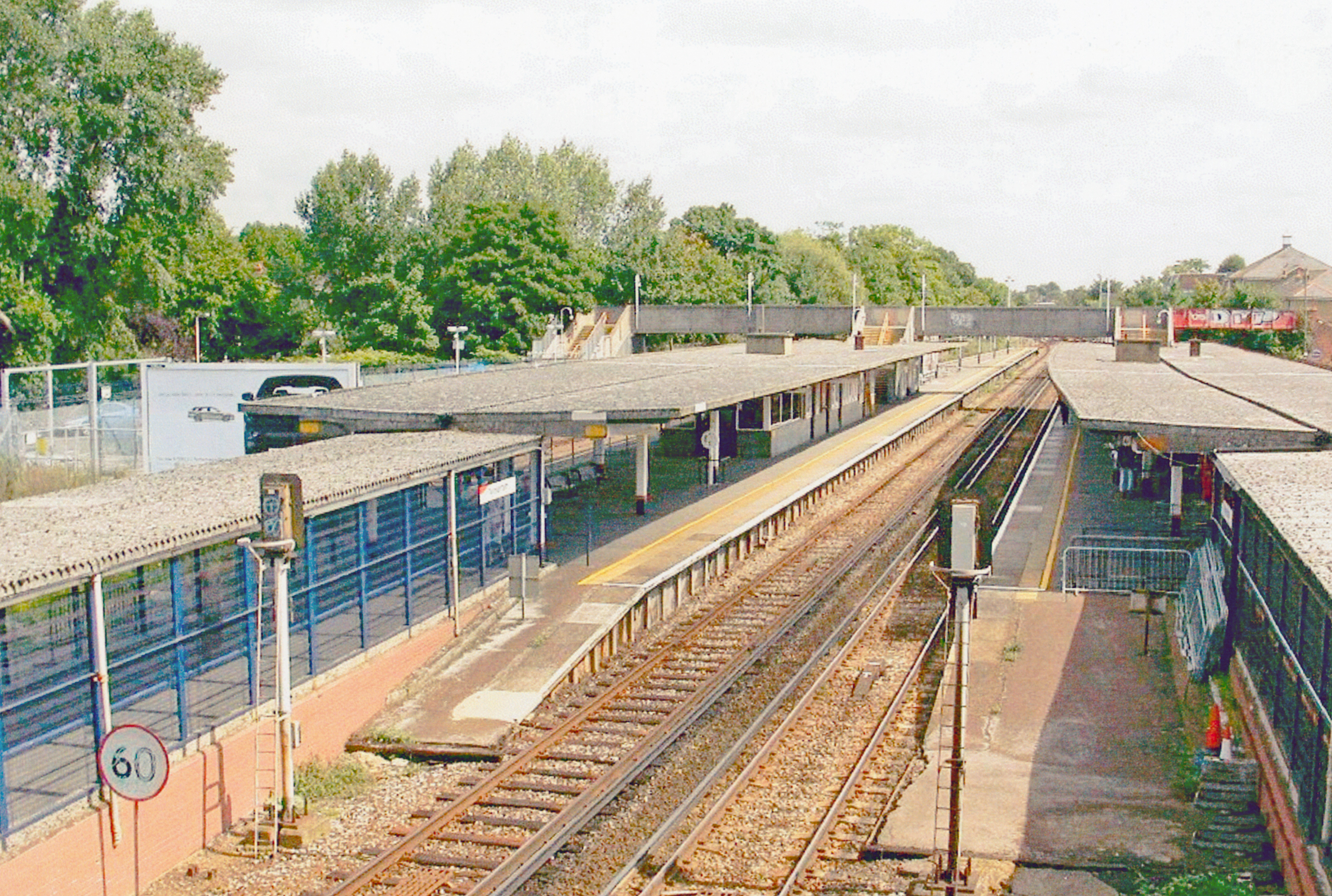
Station platforms as they appeared in 2005

Platform 1 has not existed as a functioning entity since before 2003; platform 2 has had the conductor rails removed between 2003 and 2006. The trackbeds of both are now (2018) obstructed by temporary buildings. Platform 3 (in 2018) has direct access from the street available via a queuing area used during events at Twickenham Stadium.

On 4 February 1996, South West Trains ran the first re-privatised service nationally. This ran from Twickenham to London at 05:10. The last regular-scheduled privatised train on the main network was 48 years previously.

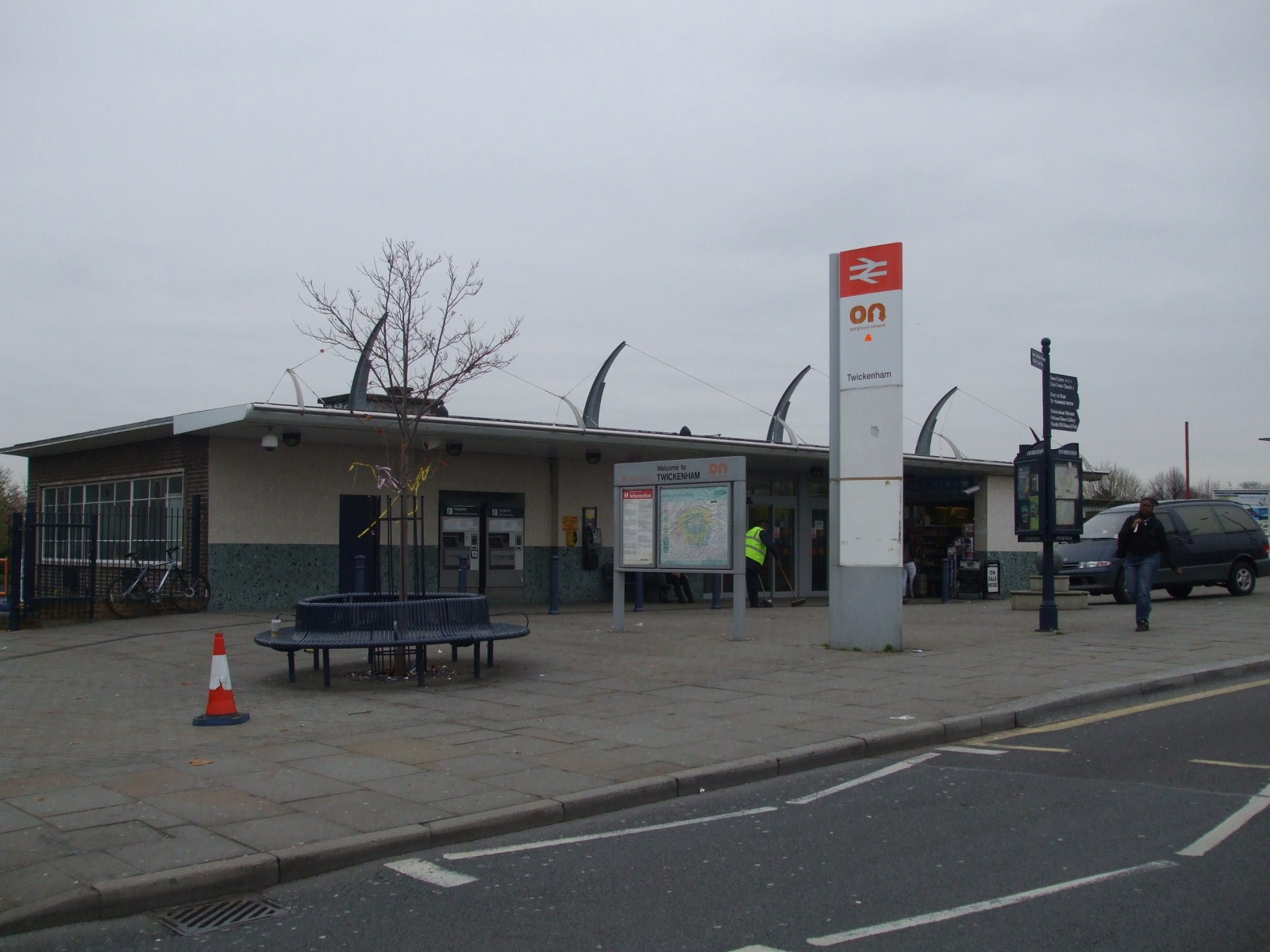
Station entrance prior to redevelopment

== Services ==
All services at Twickenham are operated by South Western Railway.

The typical off-peak service in trains per hour is:

- 6 tph to London Waterloo via Richmond (4 of these are semi-fast and 2 call at all stations)
- 2 tph to Teddington, returning to London Waterloo via Kingston and Wimbledon
- 2 tph to Reading via Bracknell
- 2 tph to Windsor & Eton Riverside

Additional services, including trains to and from Shepperton, Camberley, Aldershot and London Waterloo via Hounslow call at the station during the peak hours.

Preceding station	National Rail	Following station
Richmond	South Western Railway Waterloo to Reading Line	Whitton or Feltham
St Margarets	South Western Railway Kingston Loop Line	Strawberry Hill
St Margarets	South Western Railway: Hounslow Loop Line; Peak Hours Only	Whitton

== Connections ==
London Buses routes 267, 281 and H22, and school route 681 serve the station.

== Future ==
The RFU had petitioned the government to improve the station to be ready to handle the increased use during the 2015 Rugby World Cup. Network Rail invested in plans in partnership with Kier Property and new rolling stock was ordered. The partnership's boldest plans were countered by a residents action group. The Supreme Court refused leave to appeal from a series of pro-plan rulings in Summer 2013. The process led to reduced density and aesthetically enhanced plans and construction started in 2017. Enlargement of the complex to be mounted on a broad "podium", an outside street-level plaza, about 115 apartments, new retail units and a permanently open at-grade northern access point are being built in a programme of works forecast to end in 2020.

The works include two northern entrances with direct access and footbridge access respectively to platforms 2 and 3 (platform 1 as currently labelled is a siding); and a riverside walk beside the Crane, a large stream or small river linked to its associated Moor Mead park in Twickenham.
