= Kingston railway station (England) =

National Rail station in London, England

Kingston
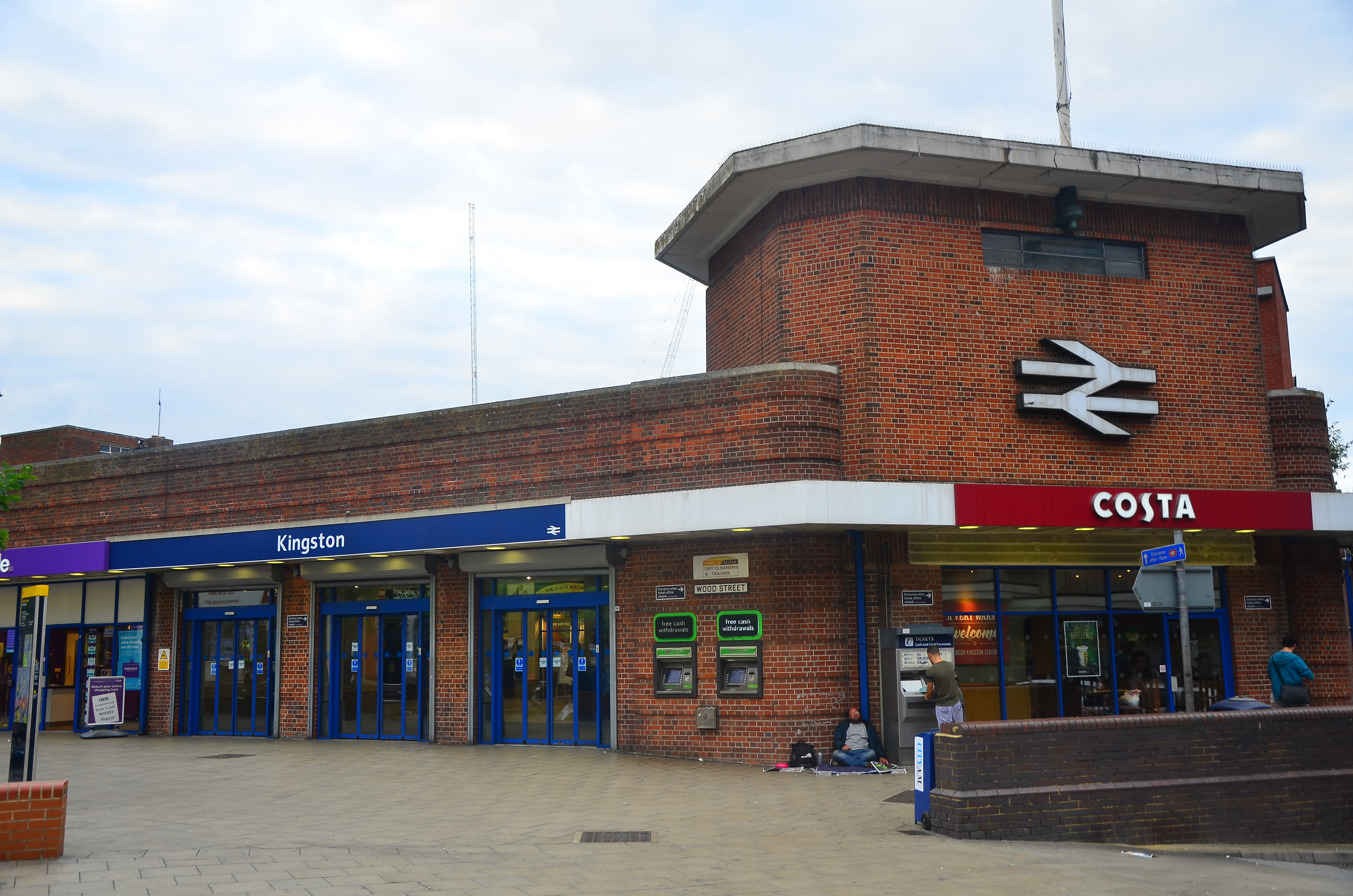
- Interactive map of Kingston

General information
- Location: Kingston upon Thames
- Local authority: Royal Borough of Kingston upon Thames
- Managed by: South Western Railway
- Station code: KNG
- DfT category: C1
- Number of platforms: 3
- Accessible: Yes
- Fare zone: 6

National Rail annual entry and exit
- 2020–21: ▼1.150 million
- 2021–22: ▲3.054 million
- 2022–23: ▲3.644 million
- 2023–24: ▲4.143 million
- 2024–25: ▲4.361 million

Key dates
- 1 July 1863: Opened (Kingston New)
- 1 January 1869: Opened (Kingston High Level)
- 1935: Two stations amalgamated and renamed "Kingston"

Other information
- External links: Departures; Facilities
- Coordinates: 51.4127°N 0.3012°W

Kingston railway station is in Kingston upon Thames in south-west London. It is 12 miles 9 chains (19.5 km) down the line from London Waterloo. The station and all trains serving it are operated by South Western Railway. It is in London fare zone 6.

== History ==
The station opened on 1 July 1863 as "Kingston Town", to distinguish it from the earlier Kingston station (which became Surbiton) on the South West Main Line. It was then the terminus of the London and South Western Railway branch line from Twickenham. The platforms built when the line was extended in 1869 to connect to the South West Main Line were named "Kingston High Level".

The Southern Railway rebuilt and unified the station in 1935. In August 2010 it was refurbished, with the entrance, but not the concourse, moving a few metres to face Wood Street instead of being at the corner formed by Wood Street and Richmond Road.

Trains for London Waterloo must stop at every intermediate station. There are no fast services available to mid distance destinations, which gives overcapacity towards the more suburban termini due to the longer journey time and overcrowding during the inner city phase of journeys. This situation can be contrasted to certain other routes to destinations just outside Greater London in certain other directions. However, due to its location on the Kingston Loop Line, passengers can also travel from Kingston to London via Twickenham.

Ticket barriers are in operation.

The station is currently in London fare zone 6, but there is an ongoing campaign for it to be rezoned to London fare zone 5.

== Station layout ==
The two northern platforms are on the through tracks while the third, at the south, is a long west-facing bay which has been used for past curtailments of the Shepperton service and allows for reversal of trains coming via Twickenham on Sundays or when there is a closure east of Kingston of either the loop or the main line. Stairs and lifts give access to the platforms.

== Services ==
All services at Kingston are operated by South Western Railway.

The typical off-peak service in trains per hour is:

- 4 tph to London Waterloo via Wimbledon
- 2 tph to Shepperton
- 2 tph to Teddington, returning to London Waterloo via Richmond

On Sundays, the services to and from London Waterloo via Wimbledon are reduced to 2 tph and the services to and from Shepperton and Teddington are reduced to hourly.

Preceding station	National Rail	Following station
Norbiton	South Western Railway Kingston Loop Line	Hampton Wick

== Connections ==
No buses stop at the station entrance, but Cromwell Road and Fairfield bus stations are less than two and five minutes walk away respectively.
