= Teddington railway station =

National Rail station in London, England

Teddington
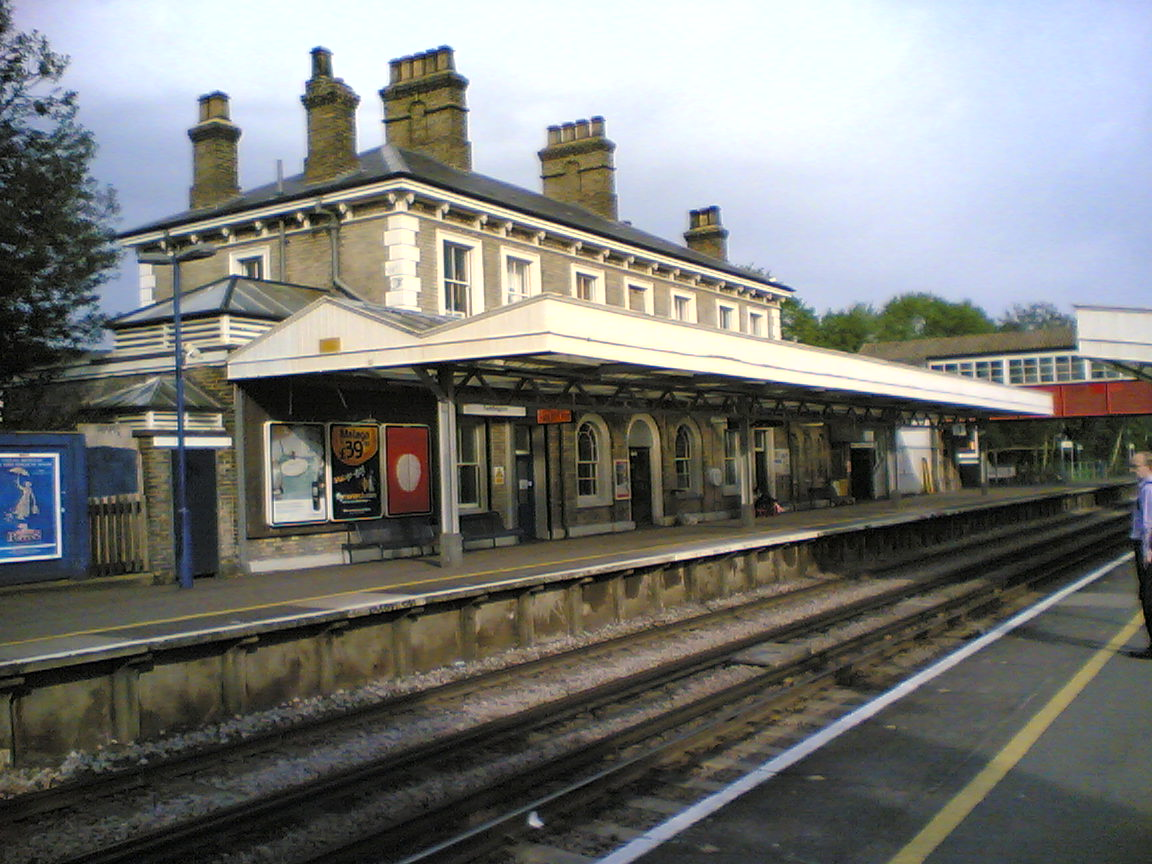
- Interactive map of Teddington

General information
- Location: Teddington
- Local authority: London Borough of Richmond upon Thames
- Managed by: South Western Railway
- Station code: TED
- DfT category: C2
- Number of platforms: 2
- Accessible: Yes
- Fare zone: 6
- Cycle parking: Yes
- Toilet facilities: No

National Rail annual entry and exit
- 2020–21: ▼0.408 million
- Interchange: ▼15,725
- 2021–22: ▲1.089 million
- Interchange: ▲46,622
- 2022–23: ▲1.381 million
- Interchange: ▲66,384
- 2023–24: ▲1.612 million
- Interchange: ▲78,169
- 2024–25: ▲1.717 million
- Interchange: ▲94,434

Key dates
- 1 July 1863: Opened

Other information
- External links: Departures; Facilities
- Coordinates: 51.4247°N 0.3325°W

Teddington railway station is located on Victoria Road, Teddington in the London Borough of Richmond upon Thames. It is in London fare zone 6.

The station, which is located 13 miles 54 chains (22.0 km) down the line from London Waterloo, is operated by the South Western Railway, as are all trains serving it. It was made a Grade II Listed building, due to its historic interest in 2012.

== Station layout ==
There are two platforms joined by a footbridge near the north-western end of the station buildings. This footbridge is usable either externally to provide access from Victoria Road to Station Road or internally to provide access between the platforms. A second footbridge exists south-east of the station between a footpath off Victoria Road and the point where Station Road becomes Cromwell Road.

== Services ==
All services at Teddington are operated by South Western Railway.

The typical off-peak service in trains per hour is:

- 6 tph to London Waterloo (4 of these run via Wimbledon and 2 run via Richmond)
- 2 tph to Shepperton

On Sundays, the services to and from London Waterloo via Wimbledon are reduced to 2 tph and the services to and from Shepperton and London Waterloo via Richmond are reduced to hourly.

Preceding station	National Rail	Following station
Hampton Wick	South Western Railway Kingston Loop Line	Strawberry Hill
Hampton Wick	South Western Railway Shepperton Branch Line	Fulwell

== History ==
Several carriages of a train that had stopped at the station were destroyed in an arson attack by suffragettes on 26 April 1913.
