= Shepperton railway station =

Railway station in Surrey, England

Coordinates: 51°23′48.7″N 0°26′48.1″W

Shepperton
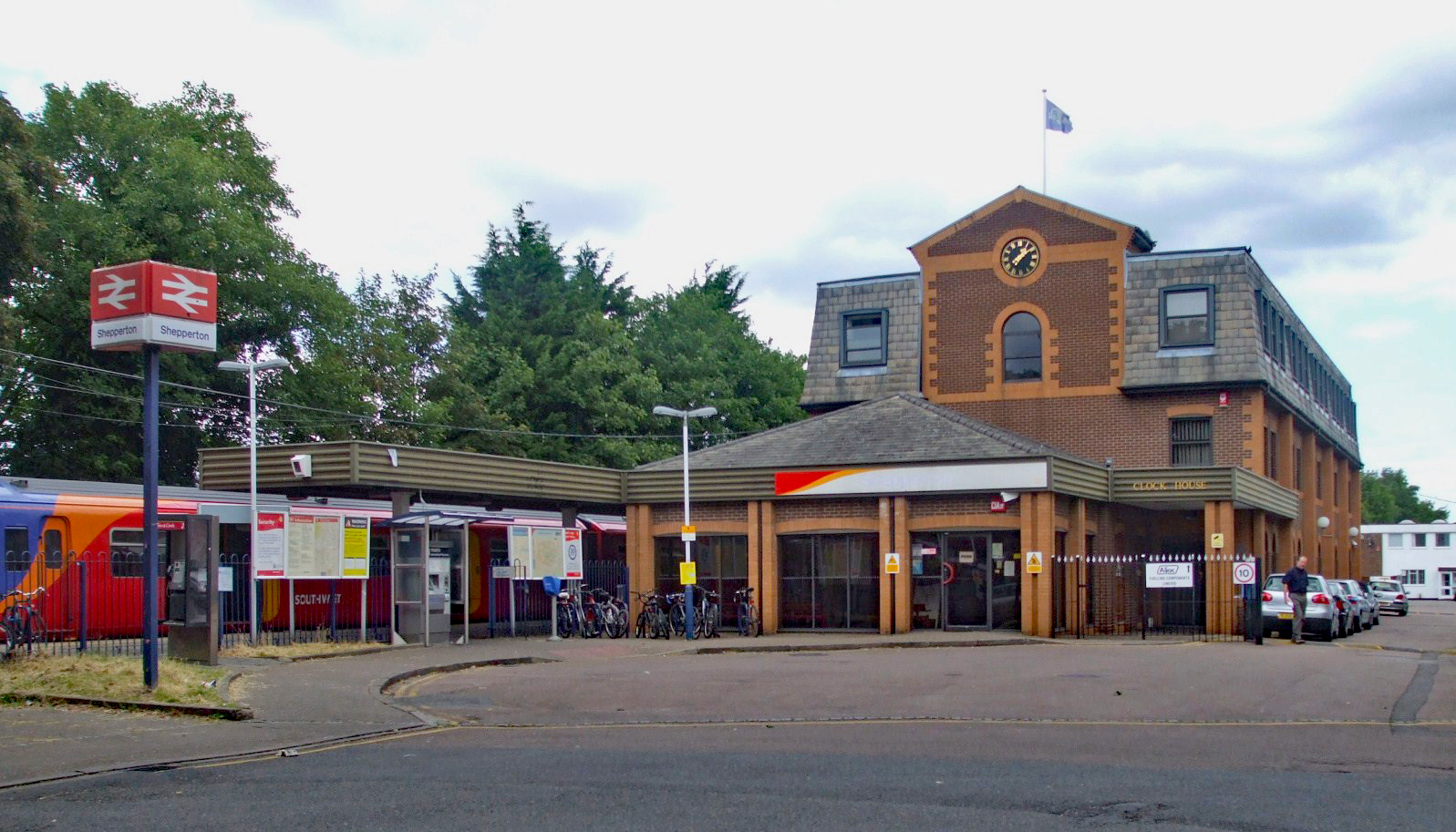

General information
- Location: Shepperton, Spelthorne; England
- Grid reference: TQ081676
- Managed by: South Western Railway
- Platforms: 1 (excluding remains of disused platform closed in 1915)

Other information
- Station code: SHP
- Classification: DfT category D

Key dates
- Opened: 1 November 1864
- Electrified: 30 January 1916

Passengers
- 2020/21: ▼78,532
- 2021/22: ▲0.219 million
- 2022/23: ▲0.285 million
- 2023/24: ▲0.335 million
- 2024/25: ▲0.347 million
Location
Notes
- Passenger statistics from the Office of Rail and Road

Shepperton railway station is a station serving Shepperton, in Surrey, England. It is 18 miles 73 chains (30.4 km) down the line from London Waterloo.

The station and all trains serving it are operated by South Western Railway. The station is a terminus with one platform operational (Note: Much of the disused north platform remains.) and a large station/office building.

Ian Allan Publishing had its offices at the western end of the station, and the company bought the Pullman car Malaga for hospitality, sited near the terminus buffers.

== History ==
The Shepperton branch opened to passengers on 1 November 1864. The original scheme intended that it would extend to a terminus on the Middlesex bank of the River Thames just east of Chertsey Bridge, but this plan was abandoned in 1862. The curve linking Fulwell and Teddington initially opened only to freight on 1 July 1894 and first carried passengers on 1 June 1901. The line was electrified on 30 January 1916.

Journey times fell from 1916 on electrification of services and were on a timetable which was semi-fast (semi-stopping) before becoming entirely stopping later.

...[Shepperton railway station is] within 40 minutes of Waterloo...[New bungalows] Two minutes from station.

— Advertisement of C. Davis owner and builder of the Orchard Estate of bungalows, Shepperton, Middlesex Chronicle. October 18, 1938

The original terminus included cattle sidings and a turntable (removed August 1942).

== Accidents and incidents ==
On 21 April 1982, a British Rail Class 508 (508031) train was running the 06:34 service from London Waterloo to Shepperton crashed, demolishing barriers and a wall. The train also slid into some new pedestrian crossing lights, rendering them unusable. The crash was initially believed to be the result of braking tests the previous night, which involved applying grease to the tracks, and that the grease may not have been sufficiently cleaned off; however, it was later found that the train's brakes were faulty.

== Services ==
All services at Shepperton are operated by South Western Railway.

The typical off-peak service is two trains per hour to and from London Waterloo via Wimbledon. During the peak hours, the station is served by four morning services to London Waterloo that run via Richmond instead of Wimbledon as well as two evening services from London Waterloo via the same route.

On Sundays, the service is reduced to hourly.

Preceding station	National Rail	Following station
Upper Halliford	South Western Railway Shepperton Branch Line	Terminus

== Connections ==
Bus routes 400, 458, 555 and 557 serve the station. All are operated on behalf of Surrey County Council.

== Notes and references ==
Notes

References

- Mitchell, Vic & Smith, Keith (1990). London Suburban Railways: Kingston and Hounslow Loops. Middleton Press.
