= Staines railway station =

Railway station in Surrey, England

Coordinates: 51°25′55″N 0°30′11″W

Staines
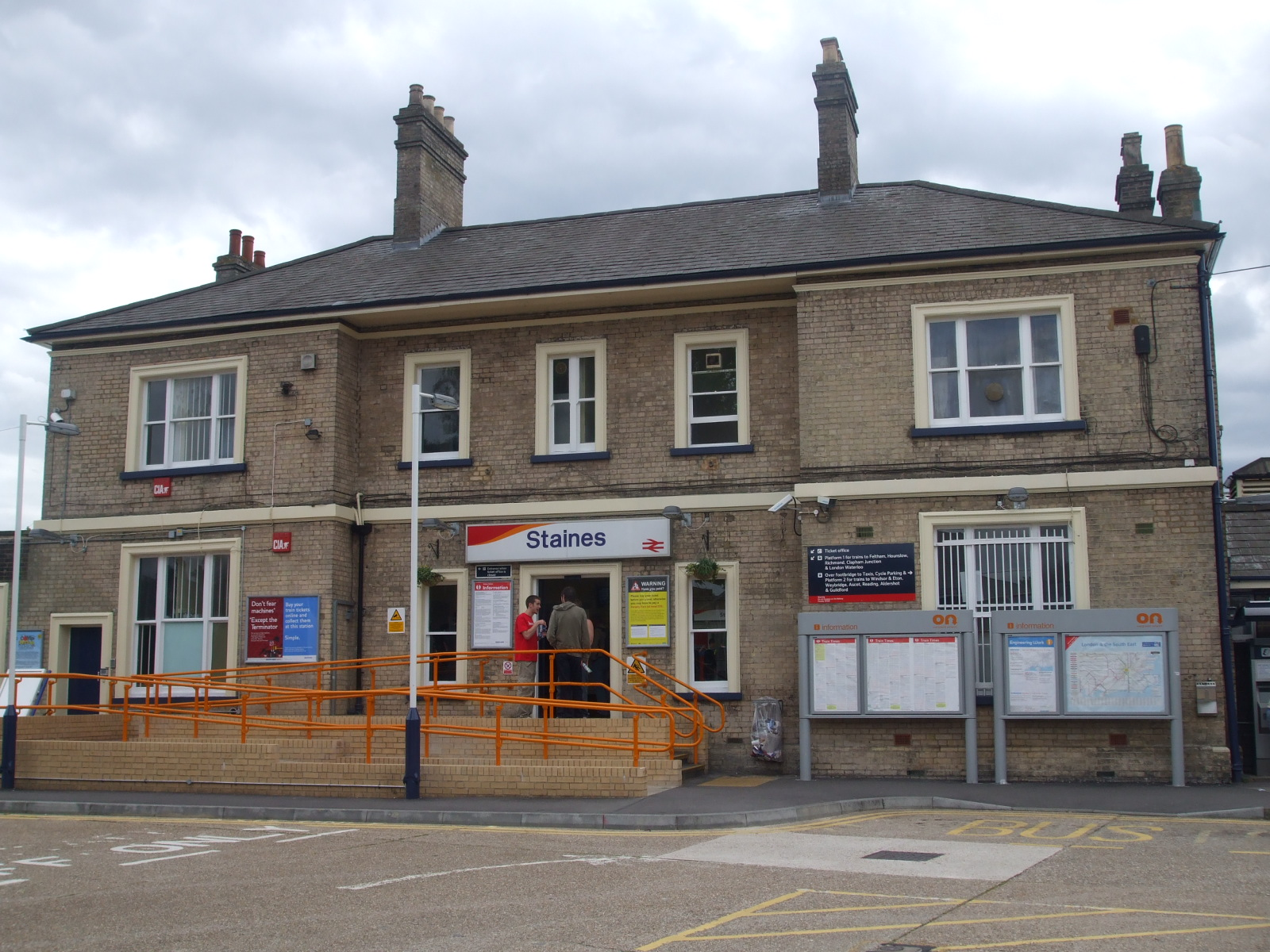
- Main station entrance on the London-bound side

General information
- Location: Staines-upon-Thames, Spelthorne; England
- Grid reference: TQ042714
- Managed by: South Western Railway
- Platforms: 2

Other information
- Station code: SNS
- Classification: DfT category C2

History
- Opened: 22 August 1848

Passengers
- 2020/21: ▼0.593 million
- Interchange: ▼60,975
- 2021/22: ▲1.618 million
- Interchange: ▲0.175 million
- 2022/23: ▲1.980 million
- Interchange: ▲0.255 million
- 2023/24: ▲2.081 million
- Interchange: ▲0.286 million
- 2024/25: ▲2.371 million
- Interchange: ▲0.327 million
Location
Notes
- Passenger statistics from the Office of Rail and Road

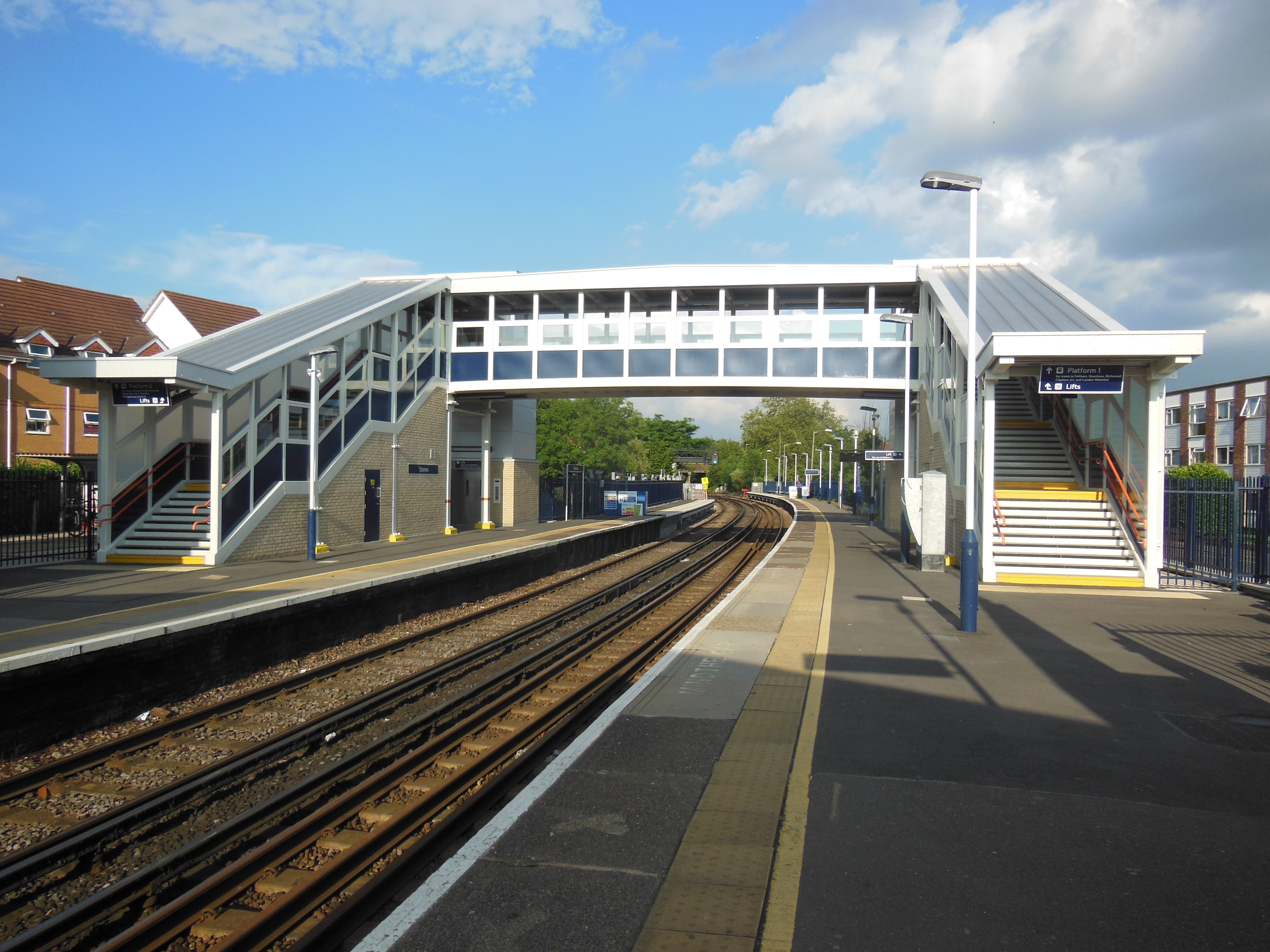
The station platforms looking east, and showing the newer footbridge.

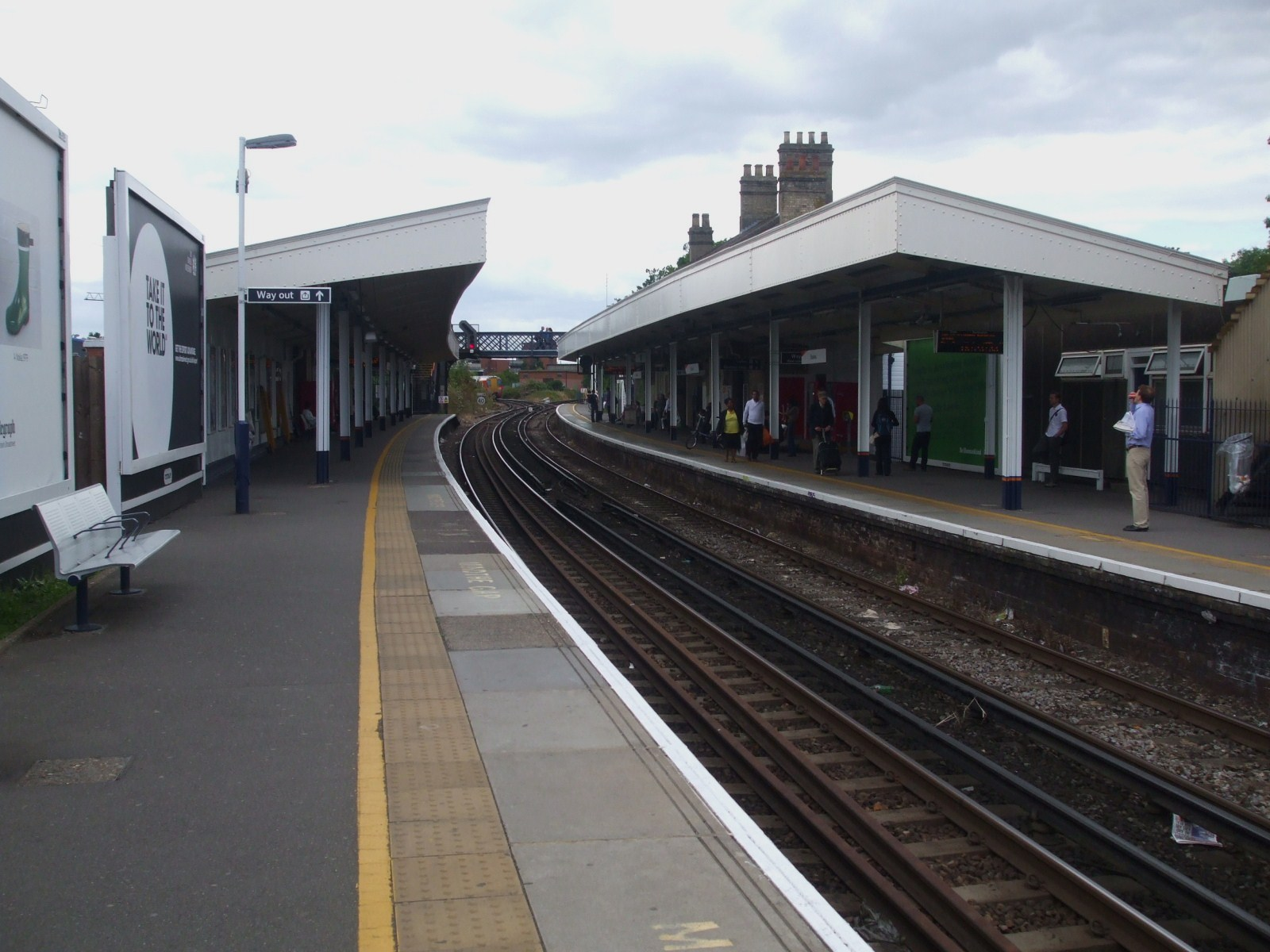
The station platforms looking west, and showing the older footbridge.

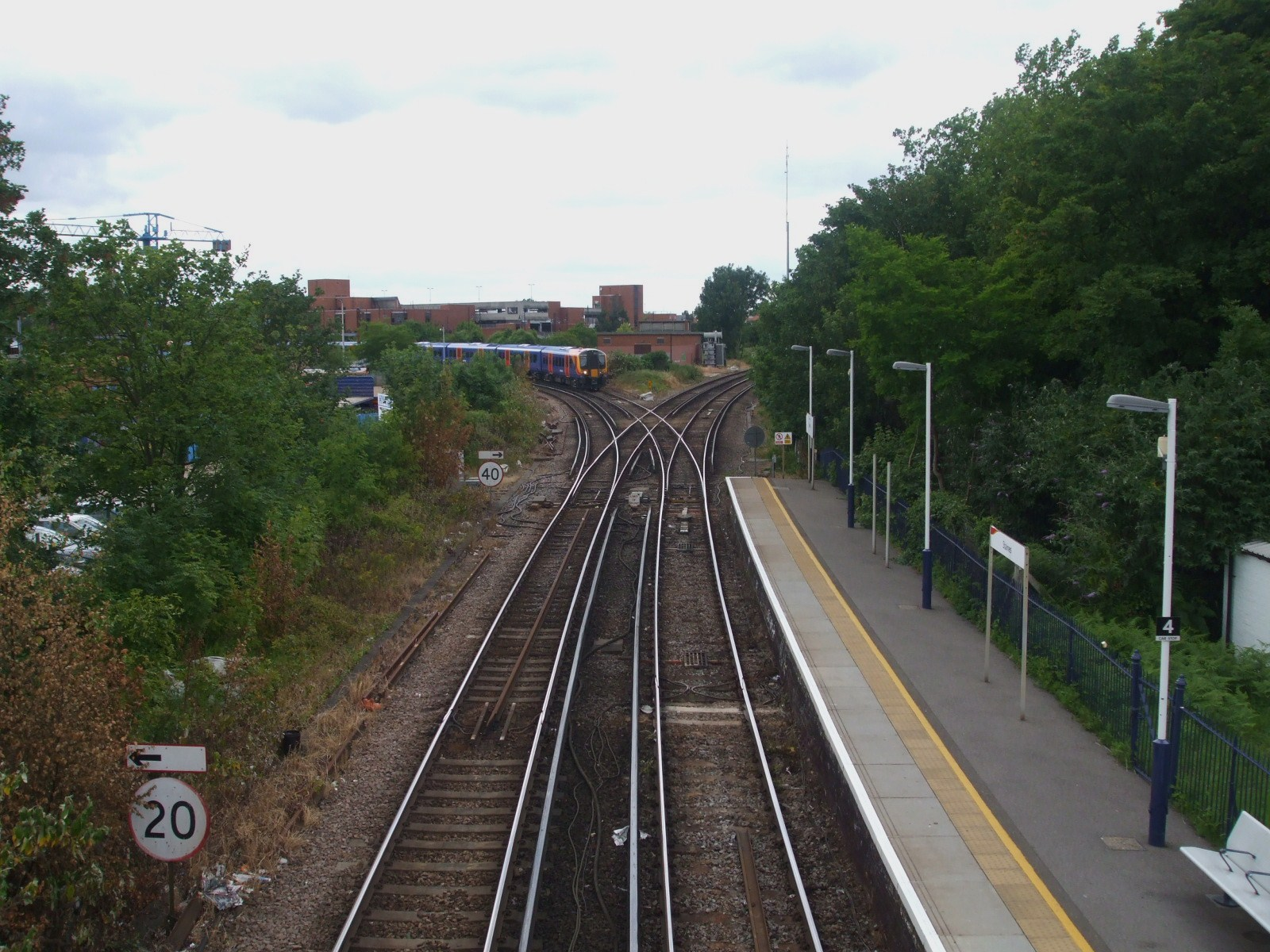
From the old footbridge, the junction of the Reading (left) and Windsor (right) lines can be seen.

Staines railway station is on the Waterloo to Reading line and is the junction station for the diverging Windsor line, in southern England to the west of London. It is 19 miles 2 chains (30.6 km) down the line from London Waterloo. It serves the town of Staines-upon-Thames in Surrey, England.

== History ==
The station was opened on 22 August 1848 by the Windsor, Staines and South Western Railway, as part of its line from Richmond to Datchet. The line was further extended from Datchet to Windsor & Eton Riverside on 1 December 1849, by which time the Windsor, Staines and South Western Railway had become part of the London and South Western Railway (LSWR). The junction at Staines, together with the line to Wokingham was authorised in 1853 and built by the Staines, Wokingham and Woking Railway, opening as far as Ascot on 4 June 1856 and onwards to Wokingham on 9 July 1856. From the outset, the line was leased to, and operated by, the LSWR, who purchased it outright in 1878. From Wokingham, LSWR trains continued to Reading Southern using running powers over the South Eastern Railway (SER).

In the grouping of railways in 1923, the LSWR and SER became part of the Southern Railway. In 1930 the Windsor line was electrified on the third rail system at a nominal 660 volts DC. The line towards Reading was electrified as far as Virginia Water in 1937, and throughout by 1939.

The Southern Railway was nationalised along with the rest of the railway network in 1948 and incorporated into British Railways. Following the privatisation of British Rail in the 1990s, the operation of Staines station and the trains serving it were transferred to the South West Trains train operating company, owned by the Stagecoach Group, whilst ownership and management of the track and infrastructure passed to Railtrack and, subsequently, Network Rail.

A refurbishment of the station was completed in November 2008 with ticket barriers on the platforms and a renovated ticket office. Wheelchair access to the platforms was provided by a new footbridge with lifts.

== Setting and previous name ==
The station serves the town of Staines-upon-Thames in Surrey in southern England to the west of London and is a pre-junction/junction station for the diverging Windsor line. (Note: The town was officially renamed as Staines-upon-Thames in 2012.) The Windsor Line, a branch of the longer route to Reading laid out as the original destination for the lines from London via Staines, is due to quirk of naming conventions in the rail sector, rarely referred to as a branch line. Both lines are traditionally referred to as "the Windsor Lines" and the passenger lobby group influencing the service pattern of the lines is named the Windsor Lines Passenger Group. (Note: The Reading line from London Waterloo has a second branch leading to Weybridge, known as the Chertsey Branch Line or Chertsey Loop Line) The station is managed by South Western Railway on a contract awarded by recurring private franchise, who continue passenger services to/from London Waterloo as since the middle of the 20th century to Reading, Windsor & Eton Riverside and Weybridge.

The station was one of three – the others were Staines High Street, on the Windsor line, and Staines West, the terminus of a defunct branch of a main west-facing route from West Drayton to the north. To distinguish it from the others during their existence the station was known as Staines Central, Staines Junction and Staines Old.

== Services ==
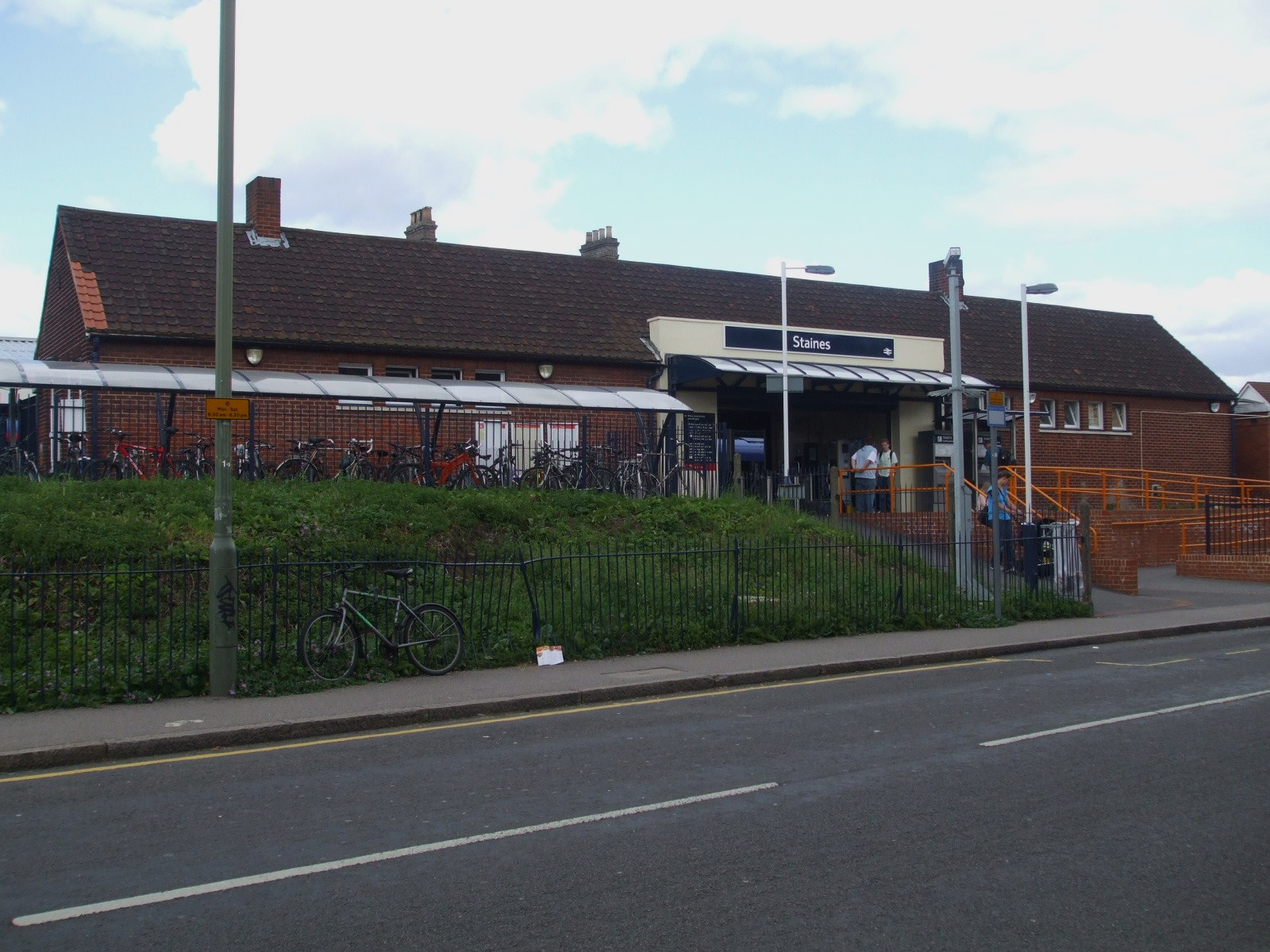
Station entrance on the westbound side

All services at Staines are operated by South Western Railway.

The typical off-peak service in trains per hour is:

- 6 tph to London Waterloo (2 of these are stopping services via Hounslow and 4 are semi-fast via Richmond)
- 2 tph to Weybridge
- 2 tph to Reading via Bracknell
- 2 tph to Windsor & Eton Riverside

Additional services, including trains to and from Camberley and Aldershot call at the station during the peak hours.

On Sundays, the stopping services between Weybridge and London Waterloo are reduced to hourly and westbound trains run to and from Woking instead of Weybridge.

Preceding station	National Rail	Following station
Feltham	South Western Railway Waterloo to Reading Line	Egham
Ashford	South Western Railway Chertsey Branch Line	Egham
Ashford	South Western Railway Staines to Windsor Line	Wraysbury
Historical railways
Feltham	Anglia Railways London Crosslink	Woking

== Connections ==
London Buses routes 117 and 290, White Bus route 438, Carlone route X442 and Sullivan Buses routes 950 to Thorpe Park and 951 serve the station.

== Accidents and incidents ==
On 9 August 1957, a light engine (a 700 class 0-6-0) was being moved from the up loop across the up main to the down main, and the signals were correctly set for this movement – amongst other things, this meant that the starting signal for the up platform was at danger. Despite this, an electric train bound for Waterloo set off from the platform, travelled 215 yards (197 m) and collided almost head-on with the light engine, which overturned injuring both of its crew – the driver's leg was broken. The leading coach of the electric train was severely damaged; the motorman and twelve of the seventy passengers sustained minor injuries.

== Future plans ==
=== Additional route and track proposals ===
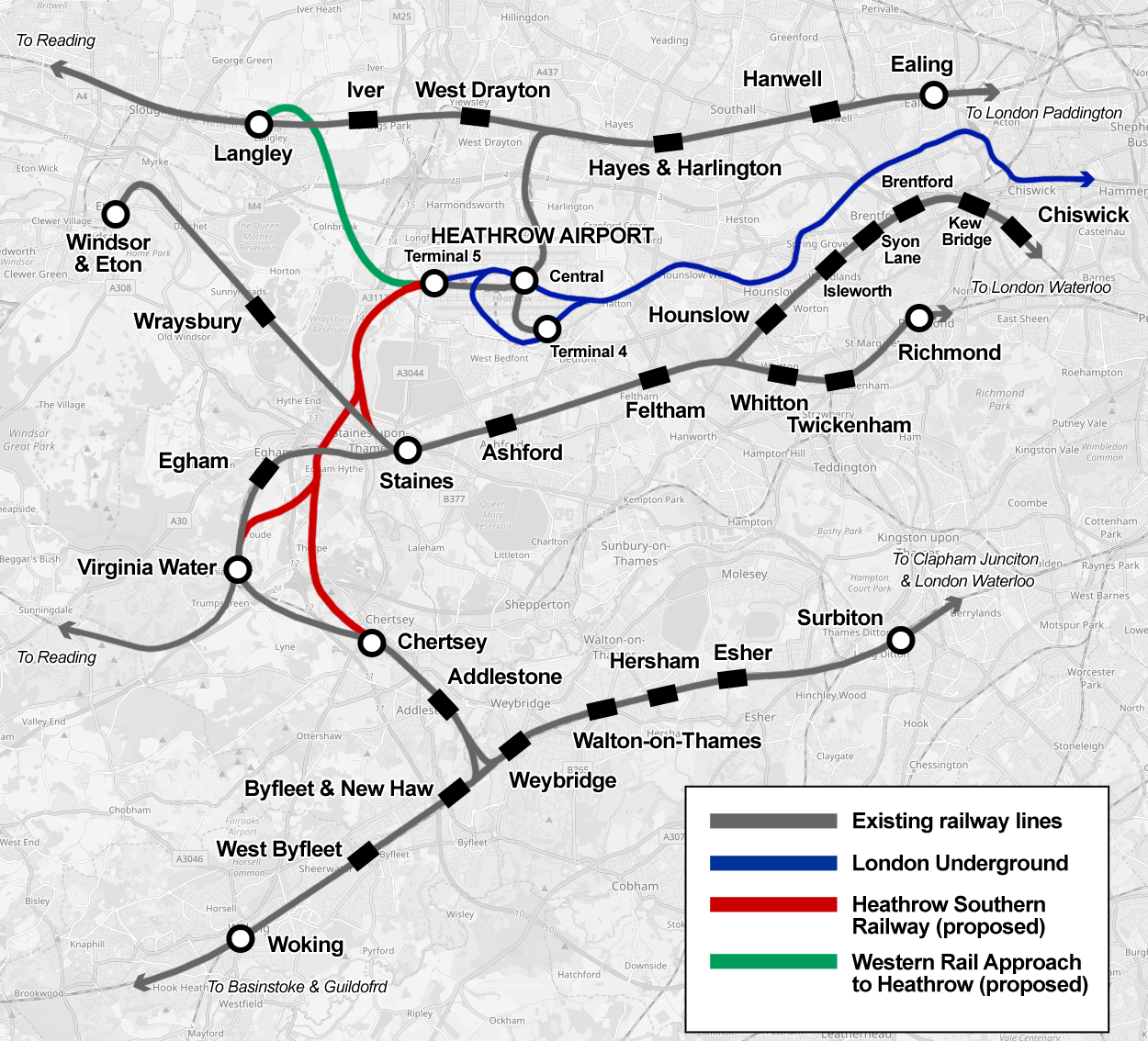
Heathrow Southern Railway (proposed)

Since 2000, a number of transport proposals have been put forward to improve rail connections with Heathrow Airport. The Heathrow Airtrack scheme, proposed in 2000 by BAA, envisaged the creation of a direct rail service from Heathrow Airport via Staines to Waterloo. The scheme would have involved reopening part of the disused Staines and West Drayton line and the construction of a spur line to Heathrow Terminal 5. A new station was also planned close to the site of the former Staines High Street railway station. The new link would also have enabled the existing Heathrow Express service to be extended from Heathrow to terminate at Staines. Heathrow Airtrack was abandoned in 2011 due to forecast problems with the large number of level crossings on the route into London.

A further scheme for new rail links to Heathrow via Staines is currently at the proposal stage. The Heathrow Southern Railway was put forward by a business consortium to create links west of Heathrow Airport with the Waterloo–Reading line, the Great Western Main Line and the Hounslow Loop Line, including a link to Staines.
