= Wraysbury railway station =

Railway station in Berkshire, England

Coordinates: 51.458°N 0.542°W

Wraysbury
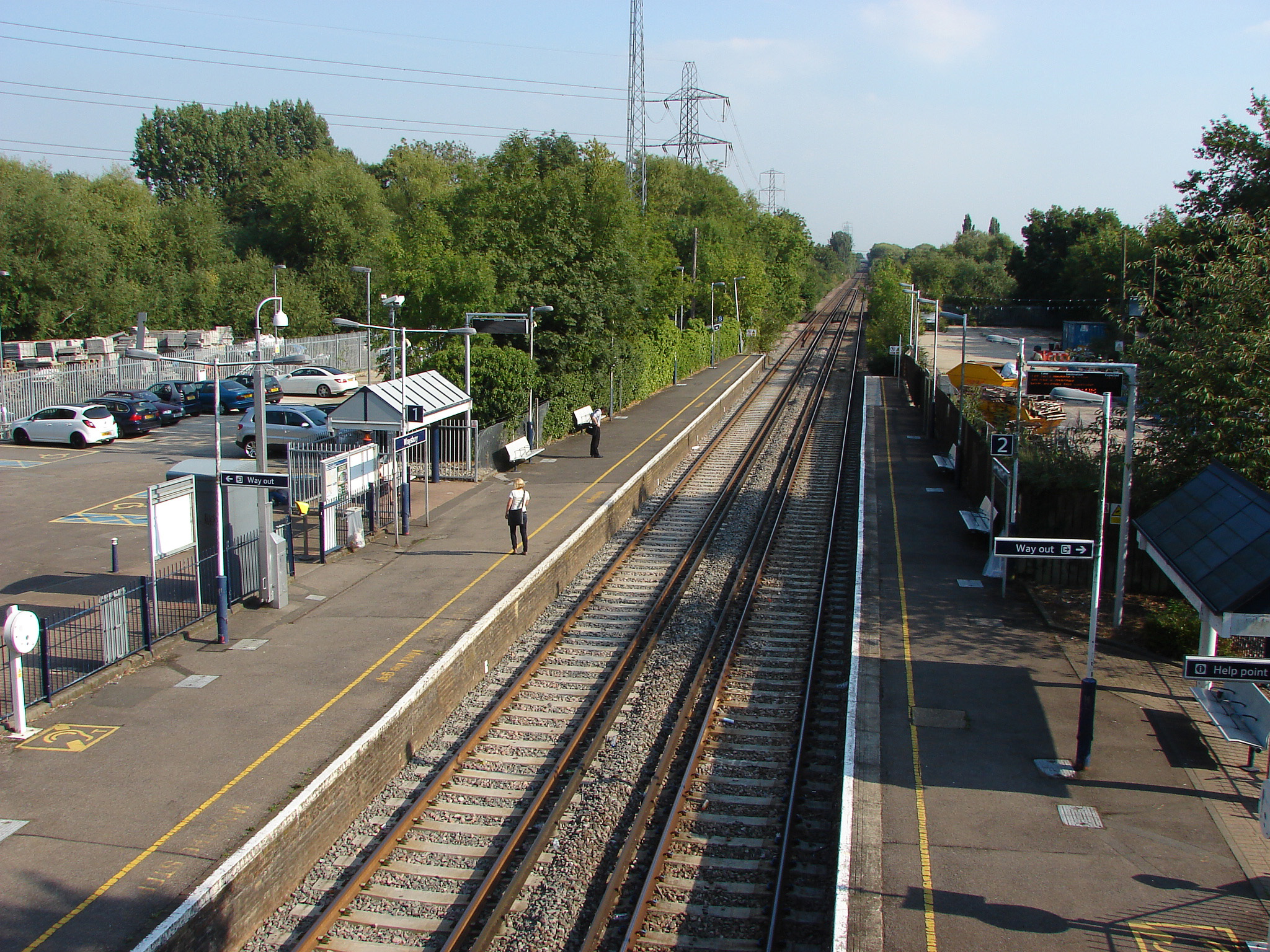

General information
- Location: Wraysbury, Royal Borough of Windsor and Maidenhead; England
- Grid reference: TQ014742
- Managed by: South Western Railway
- Platforms: 2

Other information
- Station code: WRY
- Classification: DfT category F2

Key dates
- 22 August 1848: first station opened
- 1 April 1861: Present station opened

Passengers
- 2020/21: ▼18,260
- 2021/22: ▲51,002
- 2022/23: ▲64,720
- 2023/24: ▲69,826
- 2024/25: ▲82,070
Location
Notes
- Passenger statistics from the Office of Rail and Road

Wraysbury railway station serves the village of Wraysbury in Berkshire, England, as well as the larger villages of Stanwell Moor and Poyle. It is 21 miles 40 chains (34.6 km) down the line from London Waterloo. The first station opened in 1848 but was resited in 1861 when the present station was opened.

The station is on the line between Windsor and Eton Riverside and Waterloo. Services are operated by South Western Railway.

As part of the proposed AirTrack rail link, a new station, to be called Staines High Street railway station would be built between Wraysbury and Staines railway station. This proposal (involving rebuilding a former station) has been in doubt for some years.

== Services ==
All services at Wraysbury are operated by South Western Railway.

The typical off-peak service in trains per hour is:

- 2 tph to London Waterloo via Richmond
- 2 tph to Windsor & Eton Riverside

On Sundays, the service is reduced to hourly in each direction.

Preceding station	National Rail	Following station
Staines	South Western Railway Staines to Windsor Line	Sunnymeads
