= WKM =

WKM, or wkm, may refer to:

- WKM, the callsign for West Haven Radio, a coastal radio station in Connecticut, US
- WKM, the callsign for WKM Radio FM 91.5, an FM station in Oruro, Bolivia.
- WKM, the National Rail code for Wokingham railway station in the county of Berkshire, UK
