= Ashford railway station (Surrey) =

Railway station in Surrey, England

Coordinates: 51.437°N 0.468°W

Ashford (Surrey)
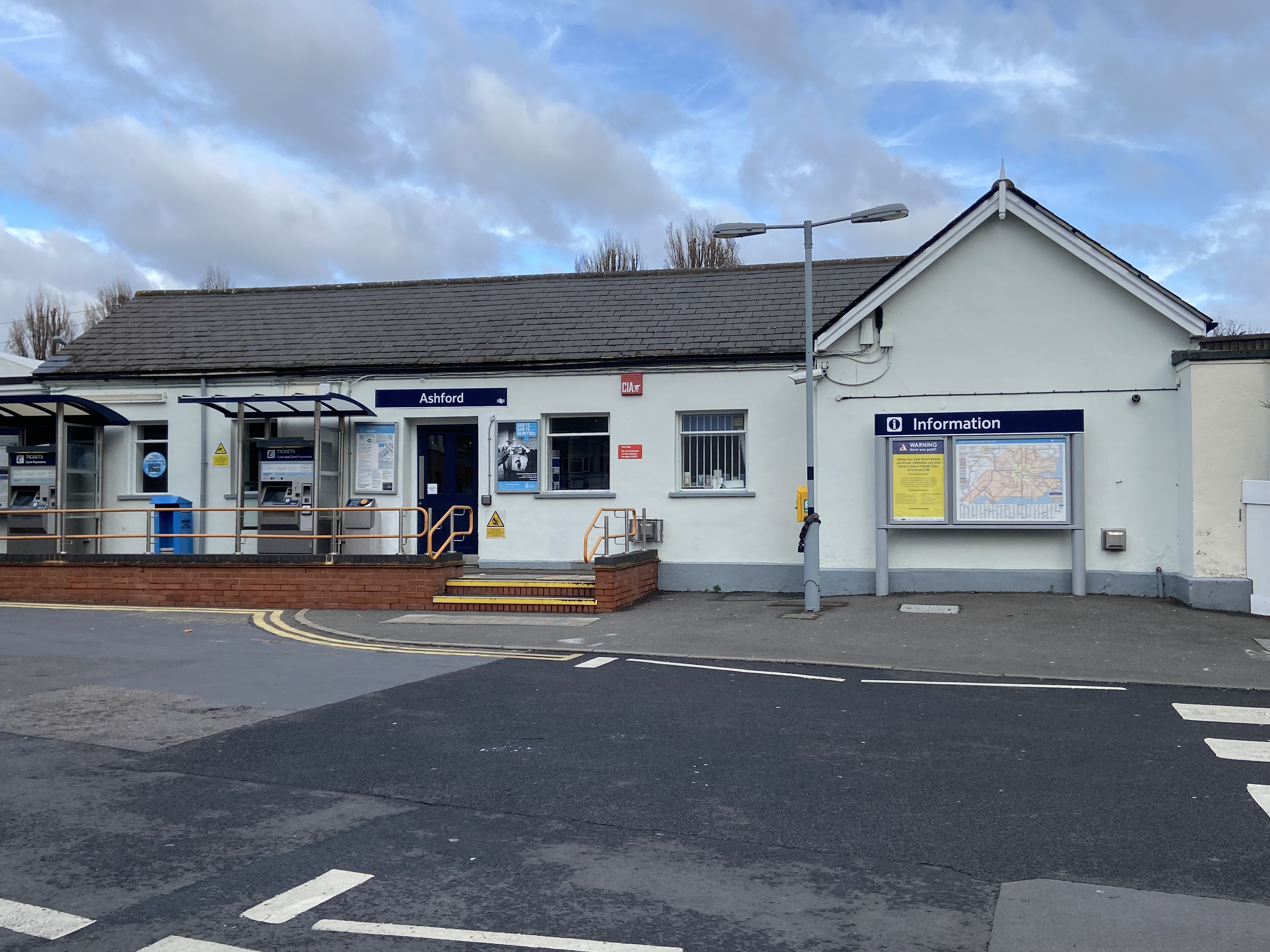
- Ashford Station

General information
- Location: Ashford, Spelthorne; England
- Grid reference: TQ065719
- Manager: South Western Railway
- Platforms: 2

Other information
- Station code: AFS
- Classification: DfT category C2

History
- Opened: 22 August 1848

Passengers
- 2020/21: ▼0.237 million
- 2021/22: ▲0.616 million
- 2022/23: ▲0.725 million
- 2023/24: ▲0.762 million
- 2024/25: ▲0.882 million
Location
Notes
- Passenger statistics from the Office of Rail and Road

Ashford railway station serves the town of Ashford, Surrey, in the borough of Spelthorne in South East England. It is 17 miles 40 chains (28.2 km) down the line from London Waterloo.

Although the station signage displays only Ashford, the station is referred to in timetables and is printed on railway tickets as Ashford (Surrey) in order to differentiate it from Ashford International railway station in Kent, which had been known as Ashford (Kent) until 1996.

== History ==
The station was opened in 1848 by the Windsor Staines and South Western Railway Company. Absorbed by the London and South Western Railway, it became part of the Southern Railway during the grouping of 1923. The station then passed on to the Southern Region of British Railways on nationalisation in 1948.

When sectorisation was introduced in the 1980s, the station was served by Network SouthEast until the privatisation of British Rail.

At the east end of the main station building is the station house (known as White Lodge), built in 1857 to accommodate Prince Albert on his visit to open the nearby Welsh School (now St. James' School for Senior Boys), although it is unclear whether he actually stayed there. The station also previously had a goods yard to the north which is now a Lidl and a self storage company.

In 2015 the station was refurbished, and a ramp was installed to improve disability access to the ticket office and waiting room.

== Services ==
All services at Ashford are operated by South Western Railway.

The typical off-peak service in trains per hour is:

- 4 tph to London Waterloo (2 of these are stopping services via Hounslow and 2 are semi-fast via Richmond)
- 2 tph to Weybridge
- 2 tph to Windsor & Eton Riverside

Additional services, including trains to and from Camberley and Aldershot call at the station during the peak hours.

On Sundays, the stopping services between Weybridge and London Waterloo are reduced to hourly and westbound trains run to and from Woking instead of Weybridge.

Preceding station	National Rail	Following station
Feltham	South Western Railway Waterloo to Reading Line	Staines

== Gallery ==
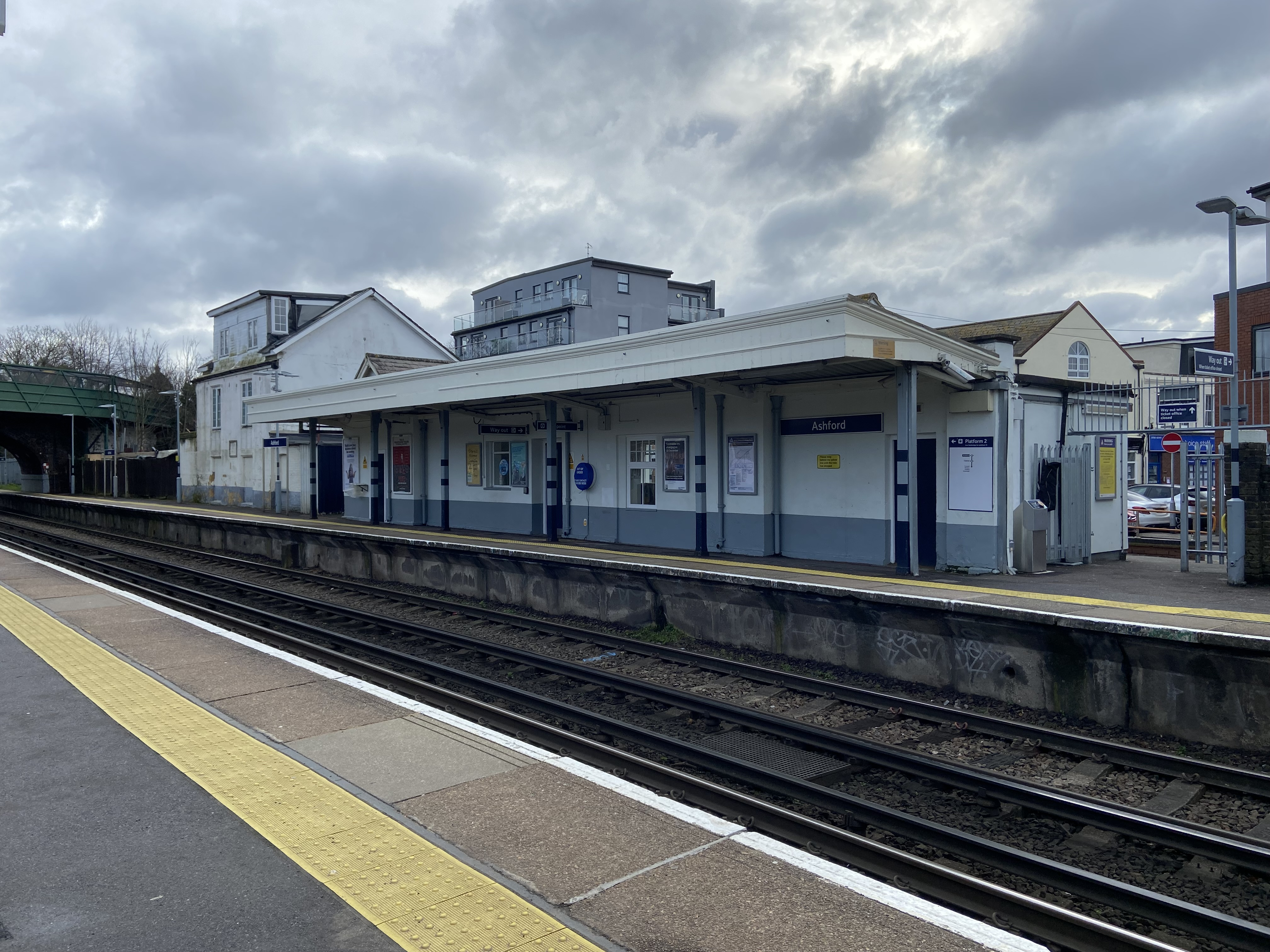
Station building (centre) and White Lodge (left)

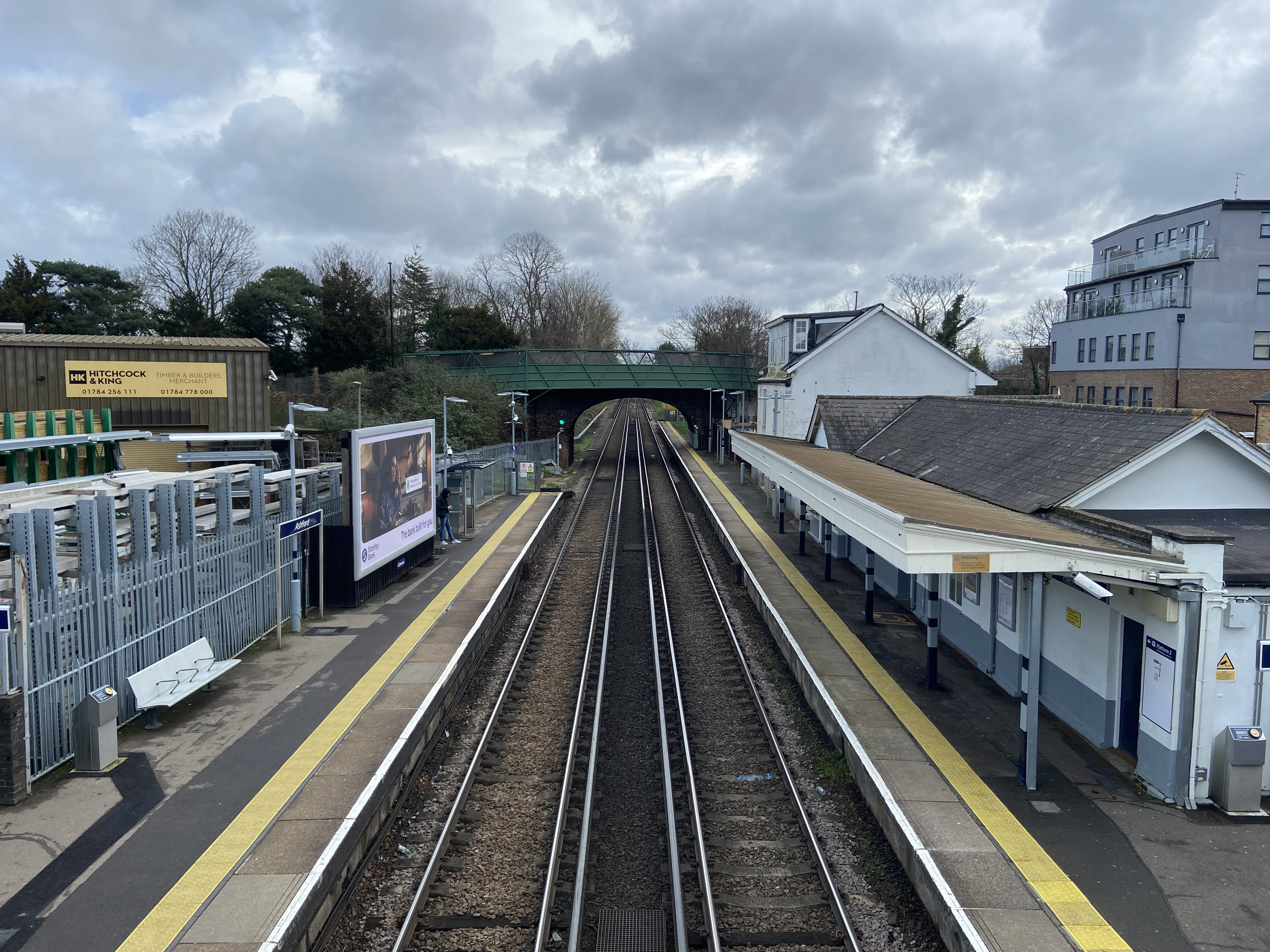
Looking towards London

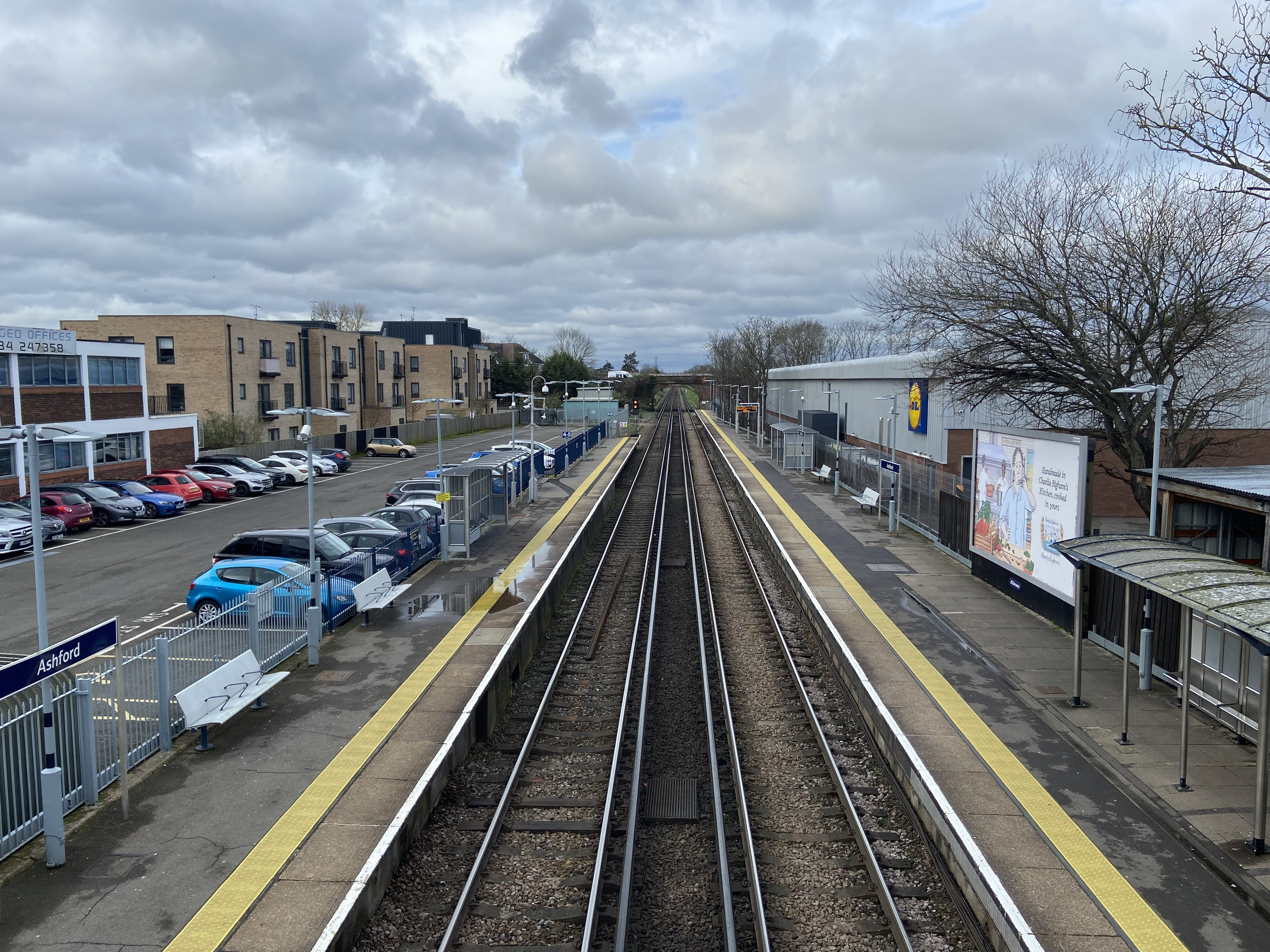
Looking towards Staines

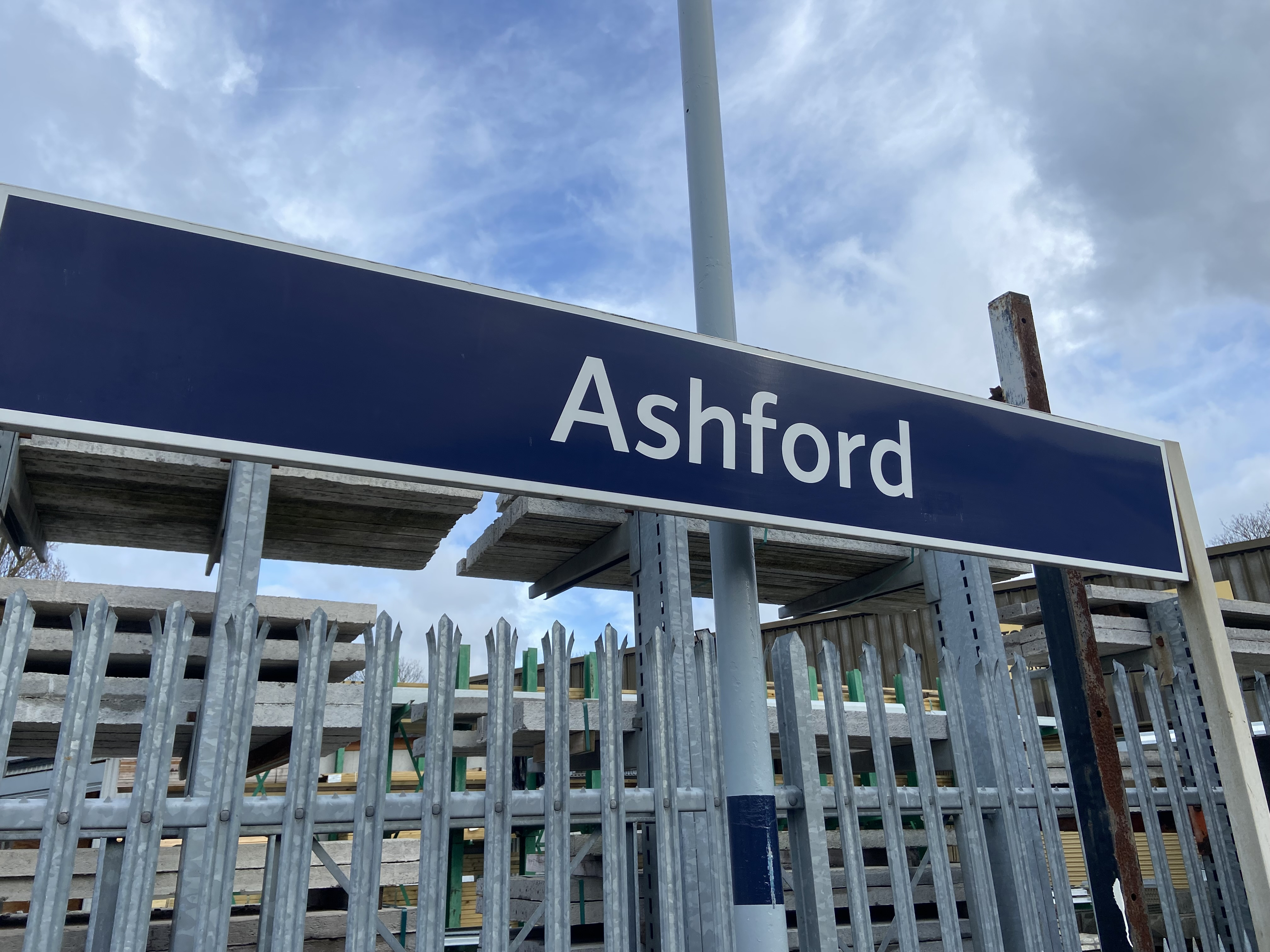
Platform signage
