= Sunnymeads railway station =

Railway station in Berkshire, England

Sunnymeads
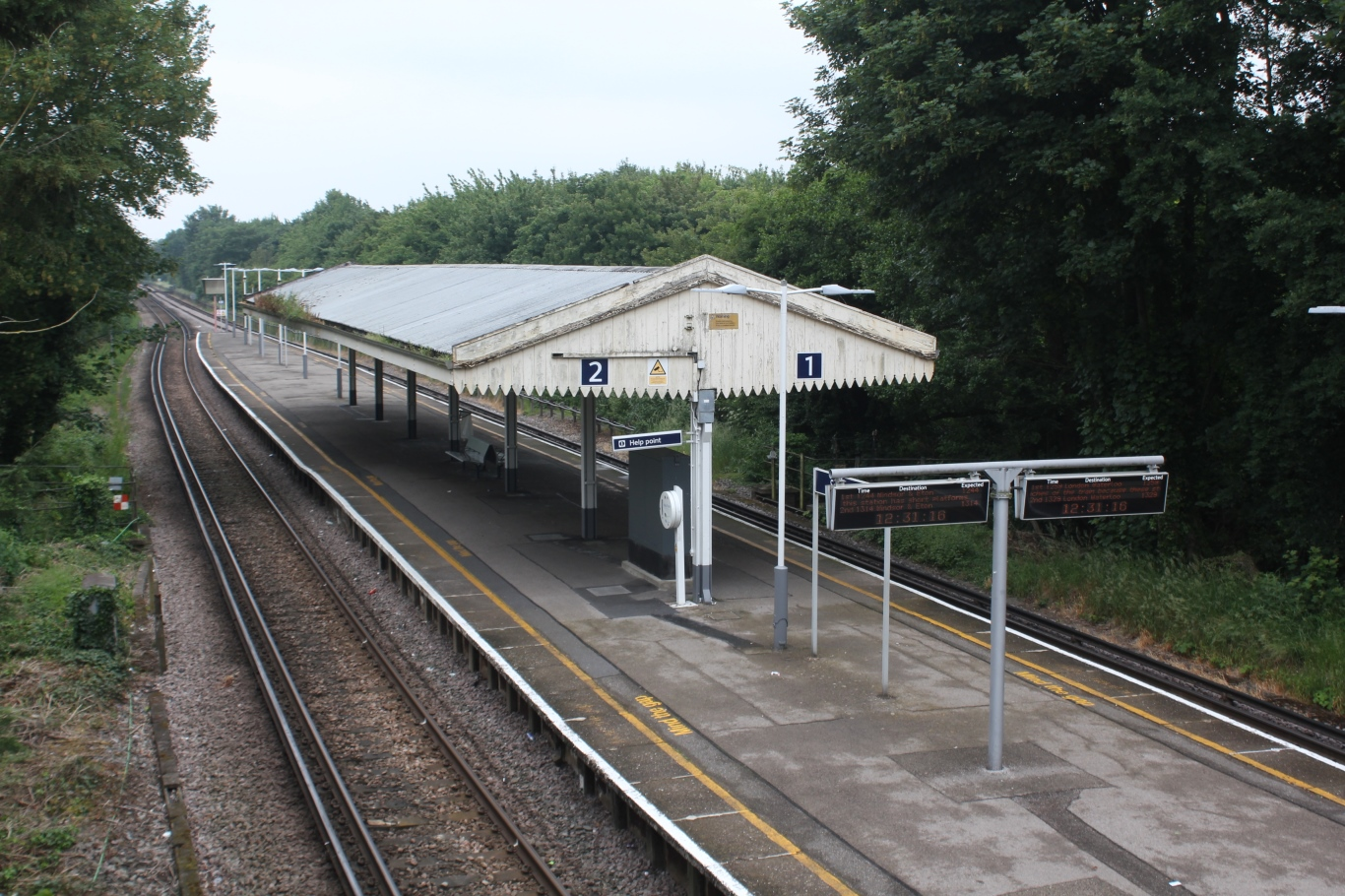
- Sunnymeads station

General information
- Location: Sunnymeads, Royal Borough of Windsor and Maidenhead; England
- Coordinates: 51.470°N 0.559°W
- Grid reference: TQ001755
- Manager: South Western Railway
- Platforms: 2

Other information
- Station code: SNY
- Classification: DfT category F2

History
- Original company: Southern Railway
- Post-grouping: Southern Railway

Key dates
- 10 July 1927: Station opened

Passengers
- 2021/22: ▲27,702
- 2022/23: ▲32,614
- 2023/24: ▼24,560
- 2024/25: ▲27,266
- 2025/26: ▲29,780
Location
Notes
- Passenger statistics from the Office of Rail and Road

Sunnymeads railway station serves the once separate village of Sunnymeads in Berkshire, England, now subsumed by the neighbouring village of Wraysbury. It is 22 miles 48 chains (36.4 km) down the line from London Waterloo, on the line between Windsor and Eton Riverside and Waterloo. It was built in 1927, and has been unstaffed since 1969. Services to the station are operated by South Western Railway.

A Shere FASTticket machine can be found in front of the disused ticket office. Credit cards can be used to buy tickets. All-day travelcards are also available to buy, as well as tickets for use on underground services in and around the London area. Sunnymeads has one of the lowest passenger usages among stations in South East England with regular services.

It has one island platform which is reached by a pedestrian bridge. On the platform there are eight seats. There are no parking facilities or cycle facilities, as the station is at the end of a private road. Taxis can be arranged to pick up and drop off at this station, but there will be no taxis waiting. (The station can also be reached by a staircase from nearby Welley Road, which is a bus route.) There is a help-point for customer information, and visual displays show live train arrivals on the platform. This station is covered by CCTV which links to the South Western Railway security centre in Wimbledon.

Due to the short platform length, the ASDO beacon fitted to the South Western Railway fleet (with the exception of class 455) only releases the doors of the front 7 coaches.

== Service ==
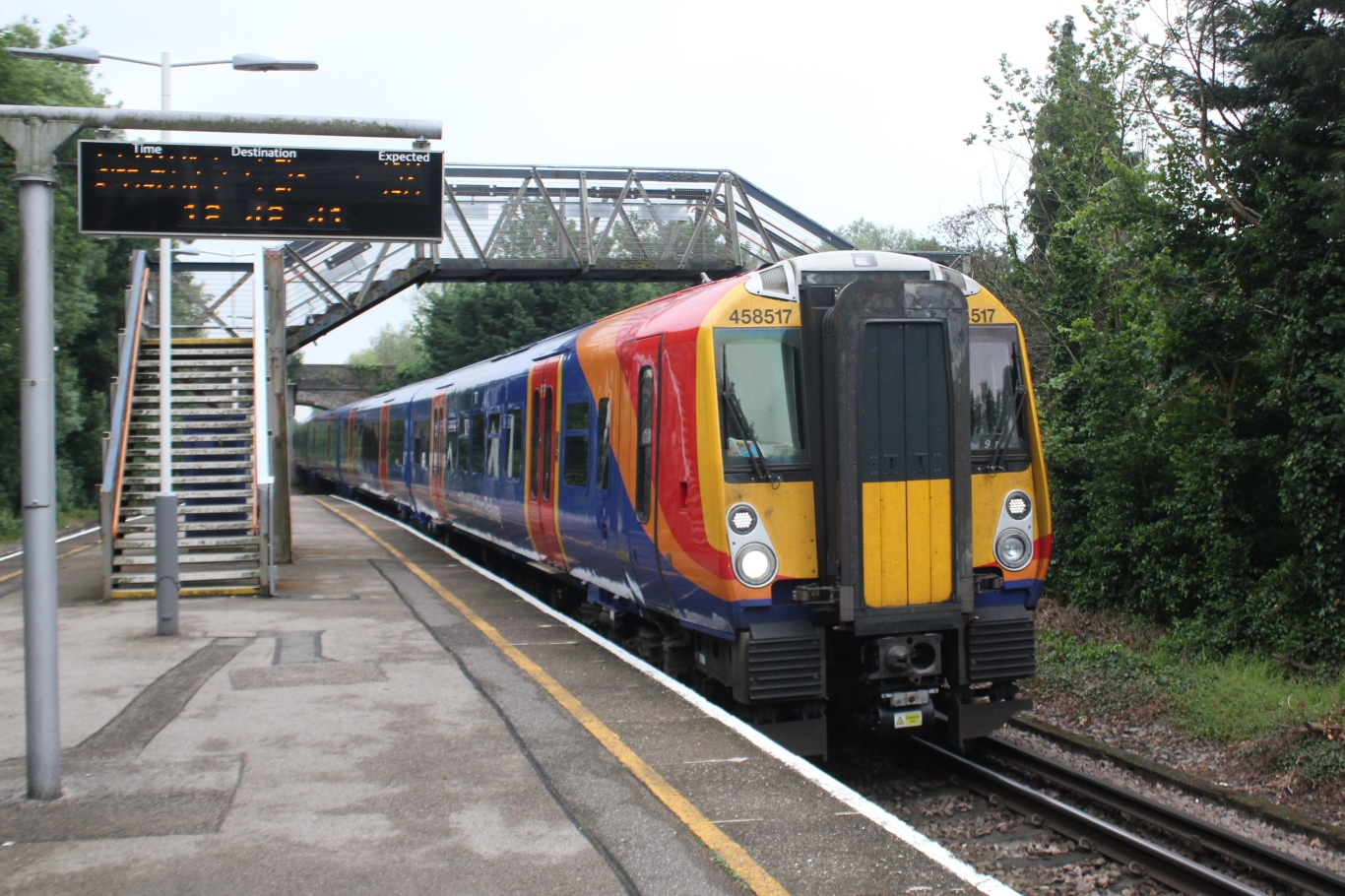
A South Western Railway Class 458 at Sunnymeads

All services at Sunnymeads are operated by South Western Railway.

The typical off-peak service in trains per hour is:

- 2 tph to London Waterloo via Richmond
- 2 tph to Windsor & Eton Riverside

On Sundays, the service is reduced to hourly in each direction.

Preceding station	National Rail	Following station
Wraysbury	South Western Railway Staines to Windsor Line	Datchet
