= Waterloo–Reading line =

Suburban electric railway line in England, linking London Waterloo and Reading

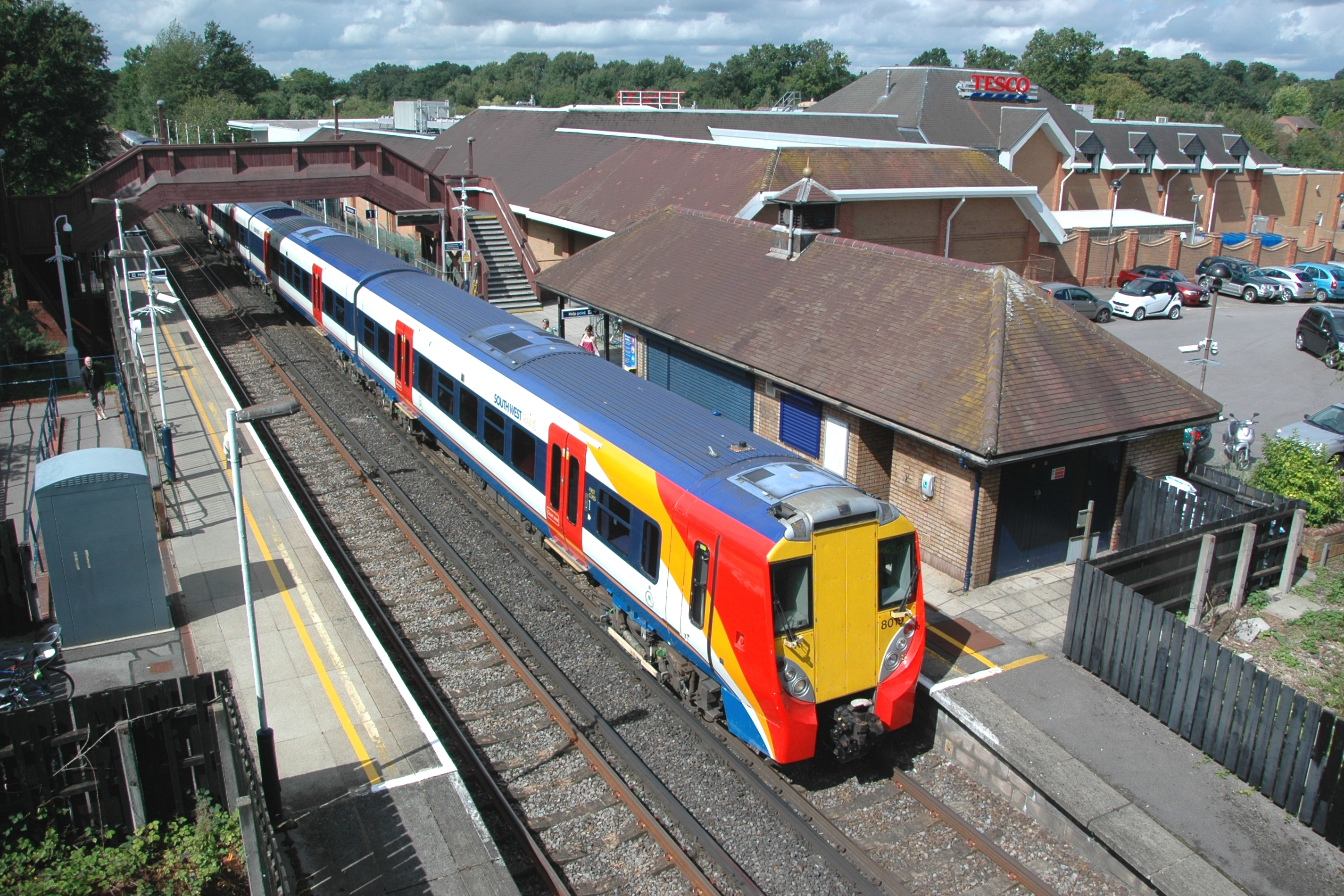
- An SWT Class 458 at Martins Heron

Overview
- Status: Operational
- Owner: Network Rail
- Locale: Greater London; Surrey; Berkshire
- Termini: London Waterloo; Reading
- Stations: 26

Service
- Type: Commuter rail
- System: National Rail
- Operator(s): South Western Railway
- Rolling stock: Class 458; Class 701

Technical
- Line length: 43 mi 28 ch (69.77 km)
- Track gauge: 1,435 mm (4 ft 8 1/2 in) standard gauge
- Electrification: Third rail, 750 V DC
- Operating speed: 70 mph (110 km/h)
Route map
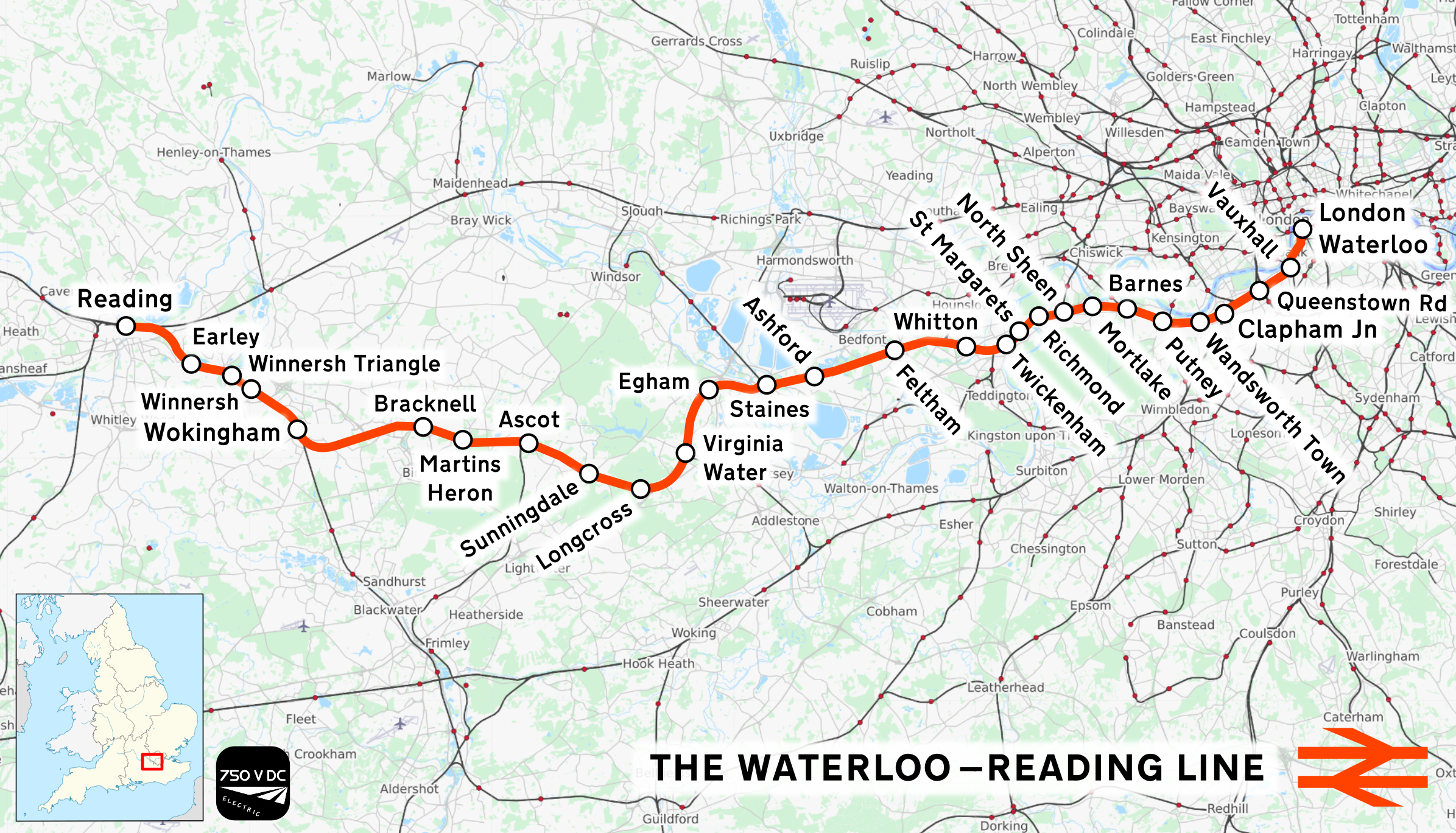
(Click to expand)

The Waterloo–Reading line is a National Rail electric railway line between London Waterloo and Reading. The line runs west through a series of South West London suburbs to Reading, in central Berkshire. Its passenger operation is by South Western Railway (SWR), which also manages its stations.

The Waterloo–Reading line is the core of a group of lines and branches heading generally westwards from Waterloo, providing predominantly passenger services into London. All of the branches and connecting lines have direct services into a dedicated group of platforms at Waterloo, so most of the services using the line do not run the whole length of the line. After leaving Waterloo, the line runs parallel to the South West Main Line before diverging at Clapham Junction and heading westwards. Within Greater London, the Hounslow Loop Line diverges at Barnes and reconnects again near Feltham, whilst the Kingston Loop Line diverges at Twickenham to join up with the South West Main Line at New Malden. At Staines, the original route carries onto Windsor, whilst the 1853 route to Reading diverges to run via Egham. At Virginia Water, the Chertsey Branch Line provides another connection to the South West Main Line whilst at Ascot, the Ascot–Guildford line heads southwards towards Aldershot and Farnham. At Wokingham, the line joins the west end of the North Downs Line leading into Reading, to terminate in platforms 4, 5 and 6. The line also sees some freight services and special charters, which use the connecting line at Reading to join the Great Western Main Line or the Chertsey Loop/Branch Line to connect to the South West Main Line.

Due to the large swathes of suburbs served along the line and the drop from four to two tracks west of Barnes, services between Reading and London Waterloo take significantly longer than services to London Paddington via the Great Western Main line. The line is predominantly used for commuter traffic into London with most of the traffic being generated by intermediate stations. To ease over-crowding, a roll-out is underway of 8-car trains being extended to 10 coaches and there have been calls to change the service patterns to provide some additional and faster services, cutting out some of the intermediate stops.

== History ==
The London and Southampton Railway opened the first stretch of railway between Nine Elms and Woking Common on 12 May 1838, and renamed itself as the London and South Western Railway (L&SWR) one month later. As the L&SWR continued extending its railway towards Southampton, the first branch was opened by the Richmond and West End Railway (R&WER) to Richmond on 27 July 1846. This branch line started at what is now Clapham Junction, although the station itself did not open until 2 March 1863. The terminus at Nine Elms was replaced on 11 July 1848 with a new station at Waterloo, originally named Waterloo Bridge. The Richmond branch was extended further west by the Windsor, Staines and South Western Railway (WS&SWR) opening as far as Datchet on 22 August 1848 and to Windsor on 1 December 1849. Both the R&WER and WS&SWR were purchased by the L&SWR before their respective lines had been completed.

The South Eastern Railway (SER) opened its line from Wokingham to Reading on 15 October 1849 under the auspices of the Reading, Guildford and Reigate Railway (RG&RR), which was then taken over by the SER in 1852. This was part of the SER line from London to Reading via Guildford and terminated at Reading Southern railway station, which was adjacent to, but separate from the Great Western Railway station at Reading.

The line linking Staines with Wokingham was authorised in 1853 and built by the Staines, Wokingham and Woking Railway, opening from Staines to Ascot on 4 June 1856 and onwards to Wokingham on 9 July 1856. Initial services on the line were 6 trains a day between Waterloo and Reading (2 on Sundays), building up to 14 trains a day (7 on Sunday) by 1928. The line was operated by the L&SWR from the outset, who leased it from the owning company in 1858 for 50% of the gross profits, before purchasing it outright in 1878.

There were now three competing routes to Reading: the GWR from Paddington at 36 miles; the LSWR from Waterloo at 43.5 miles and the SER from Charing Cross at 69 miles. Despite the disparity, the GWR was not the obvious choice due to the relative position of Paddington station, west of the City of London. This allowed intense competition between the three companies until in 1858 a new agreement between the three companies was made to fix prices and share fares. The agreement led to a connecting spur between the SER and GWR railways in Reading being opened for goods traffic on 1 December 1858 and to passenger traffic on 17 January 1859. A better-placed link was opened on 17 December 1899, and the third link on 1 June 1941. The link is today used by special services such as luxury steam services.

A new station named Winnersh Triangle was opened on 12 May 1986 between Winnersh and Earley, followed 2 years later by the opening of Martins Heron on the 3 October 1988 between Bracknell and Ascot.

On 4 February 1996 the 0510 Twickenham to London Waterloo became the first privately operated train to run in UK for 48 years.

=== Electrification ===
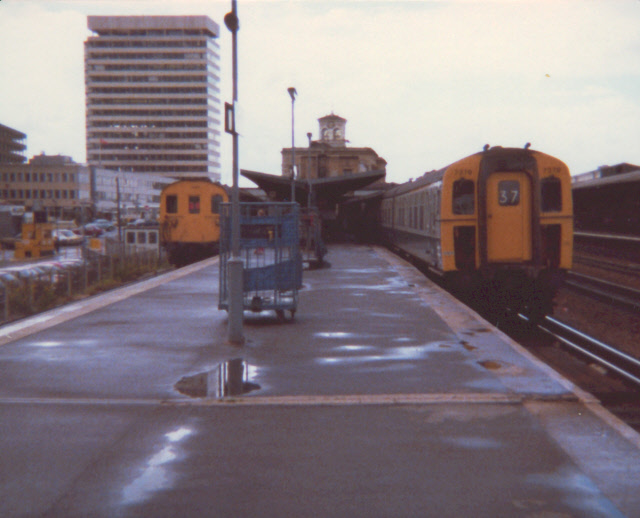
Reading station with Southern Region trains in 1979.

The line was electrified on the DC third rail system, initially at 660 volts, in sections:

- Waterloo to Twickenham flyover (for Kingston Loop) 30 January 1916
- Twickenham to Whitton Junction (for Hounslow Loop) 12 March 1916
- Whitton Junction to Windsor 6 July 1930
- Staines to Virginia Water 3 January 1937 as part of the electrification of lines to Portsmouth
- Virginia Water to Ascot and Reading South 1 January 1939.

=== Accidents and incidents ===
On Sunday 11 April 1858 a guard was killed by hitting his head on an overbridge while standing on top of a moving train.

On Thursday 16 June 1859 a special train from Ascot ran into the back of another special train at Virginia Water. No fatalities or injuries were caused but "many persons sustained damage in dress, but not, it is believed, in person."

On Saturday 13 August 1859 a train derailed at Feltham due to excessive speed and poor track condition.

On Friday 16 September 1859 a train passed a signal at danger at Staines and ran into the back of another train resulting in 7 injures.

On Tuesday 7 June 1864 6 people were killed when a special train from Ascot passed a signal at danger and collided with the train in front at Egham.

On Tuesday 11 October 1864 a passenger train from Reading collided with a goods train at Putney station due to passing an unlit signal at danger.

On Tuesday 27 June 1871 1 person was killed on a foot crossing adjacent to Twickenham station when they were struck by a train.

On Thursday 14 August 1884 2 people were injured when a special train from Windsor ran into the back of an empty train due to excessive speed and passing a signal at danger.

On Saturday 8 June 1889 a goods train reversed into a passenger train at Staines station at low speed.

On Monday 1 October 1900 1 person was killed and 2 injured when a signalman forgot that a passenger train was occupying the up platform at Virginia Water and allowed a horse box train into the station resulting in a collision.

On Sunday 7 October 1900 51 people were injured when 2 trains collided at Twickenham station due to confusion over signals as 4 carriages were being shunted from one train to another.

On Wednesday 19 April 1922 a failure by shunting staff to apply brakes resulted in a light engine running away without its crew from Ascot to Virginia Water.

On Friday 2 December 1955 13 people were killed and 41 injured when 2 trains collided at Barnes station.

On Monday 9 May 1988 bridge number 71 over the River Colne near Wraysbury was washed away by a flood.

On Tuesday 17 October 2000 a train struck a bus on the level crossing at Pooley Green between Staines and Egham. The bus driver had driven on to the crossing and was trapped when the barriers then came down. He led his passengers to safety before the train struck and there were no injuries.

On Thursday 26 October 2000 the 0821 Weybridge to Staines train derailed about 100 yards east of Virginia Water station after slipping on wet leaves and passing a signal at danger. There were no injuries.

Early on Sunday 15 November 2009 the bridge carrying the line over the River Crane, London, partly collapsed leading to service suspension. Services were restored eight days later on a temporary diversionary line with a 20 miles (32 km) per hour speed limit laid across the site of the disused Feltham Marshalling yard. The defective bridge was demolished and rebuilt.

== Passenger services and rolling stock ==
In the current timetable, there are two trains per hour between Waterloo and Reading, every day of the week; the Reading service only calls at major stations Clapham Junction, Richmond, Twickenham, Feltham (with a short bus link to Heathrow Airport), Staines and then all stations to Reading. During peak hours, additional trains are run which skip Winnersh, Winnersh Triangle and Earley, and add stops at Vauxhall and Ashford (Surrey).

Connecting lines add additional services on this line -

- Services on the Weybridge branch line (Chertsey Loop) run in part between Virginia Water and London on the line, namely before and after using the Hounslow loop
- Services on the Staines–Windsor line between Staines and London
- Services on the Kingston Loop Line between Twickenham and London
- Services on the Hounslow Loop Line between Twickenham and London
- Services on the North Downs Line run between Reading and Wokingham, but do not stop at the intervening stations
- During peak hours, four trains in the morning on the Shepperton Branch Line and three evening trains to that line run between Twickenham and London
- During peak hours, some trains commencing at Farnham and then on the Ascot to Guildford line are extended to London, providing more services between Ascot and Waterloo.

Services are operated by the Class 458 and Class 701.

== Future ==
Due to high demand and overcrowding for a considerable part of many services enhancements are underway. The stations between Waterloo and Staines, unless prohibited by bridges, are having platforms lengthened for 10-coach trains, which use converted Class 458 units. Platform 20 at the former Waterloo International Terminal re-entered service in October 2013. Additional trains were purchased in the early 2010s. On 20 November 2014, Network Rail published a plan, the Wessex Route Study, for wide consultation; its recommendations are to abolish the running of trains shorter than 10 coaches to Reading except in very low usage hours and to open more of the platforms at the former London Waterloo International with a suggested target date of 2019.

In March 2014, the Thames Valley Local Enterprise Partnership published a report showing the economic benefits of improvements to the Waterloo to Reading line. This looked at the economic benefits of increasing services, speeding up services (timetabling more semi-fast and fast services to improve access to major stops from London and from Reading) and adding access to Heathrow Airport, and concluded that the benefits exceeded the costs of such improvements.
