= Staines–Windsor line =

Suburban railway line in south-east England

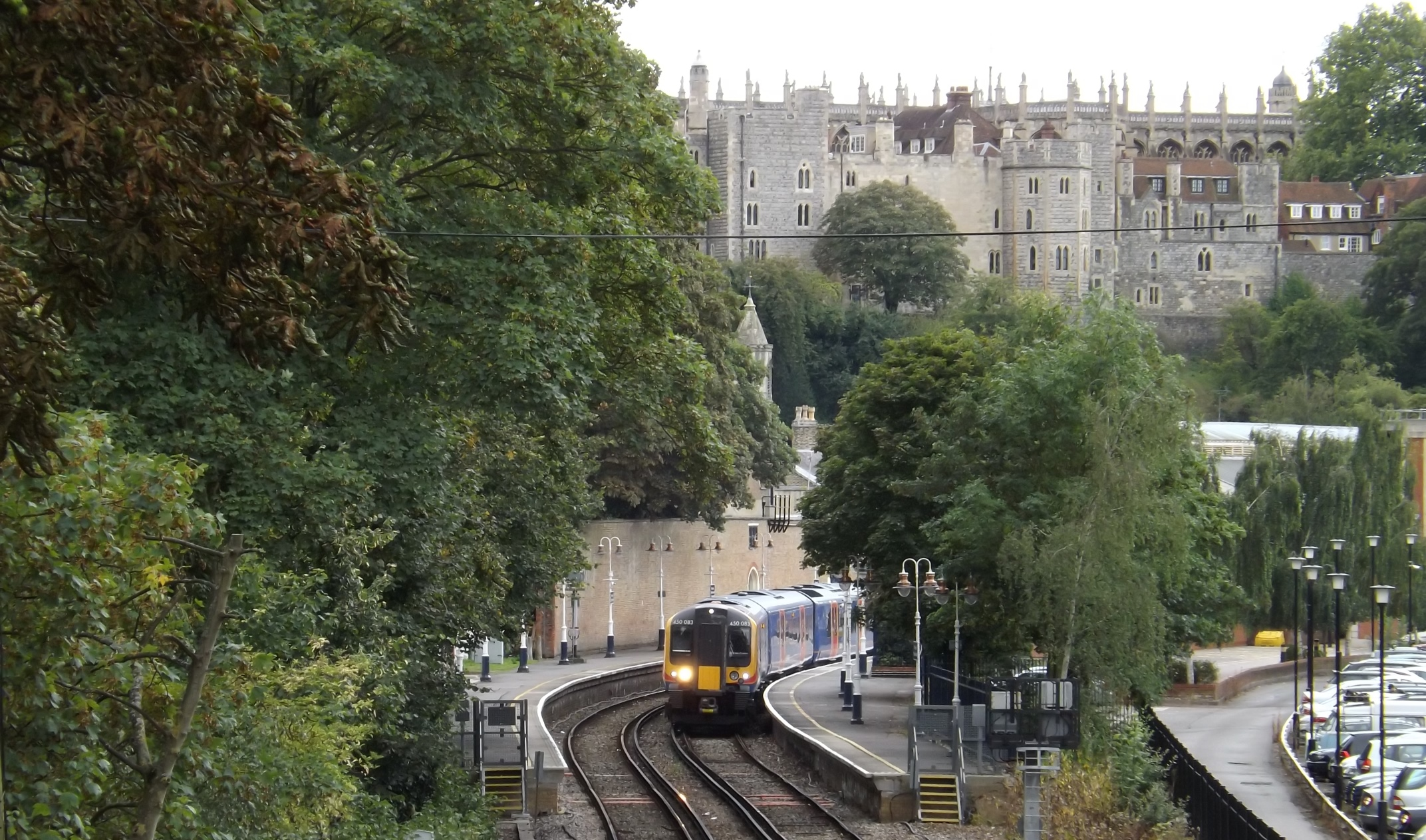
- A Class 450 unit at Windsor & Eton Riverside station with Windsor Castle behind

Overview
- Status: Operational
- Owner: Network Rail
- Locale: Berkshire, Surrey

Service
- Type: Suburban rail, Heavy rail
- System: National Rail
- Operator(s): South Western Railway
- Rolling stock: Class 701

History
- Opened: 1848/9

Technical
- Number of tracks: 2
- Track gauge: 1,435 mm (4 ft 8 1/2 in) standard gauge
- Electrification: Third rail, 750 V DC
- Operating speed: 60 mph (97 km/h)
Route map
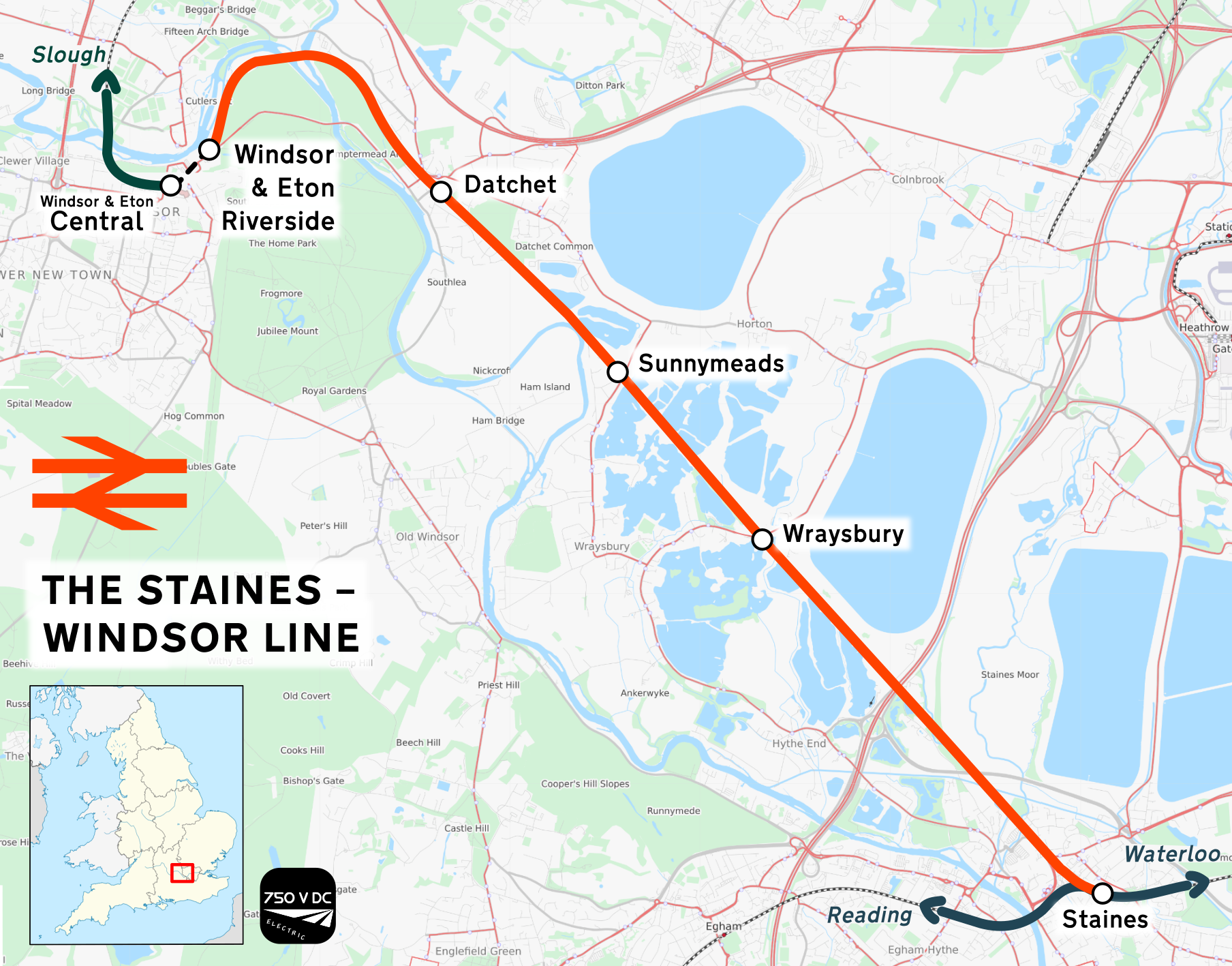

The Staines–Windsor line is a 6-mile-46-ch (10.6 km) railway line in Berkshire and Surrey, England. It branches from the Waterloo–Reading line at Staines-upon-Thames and runs to its western terminus at Windsor via intermediate stations at Wraysbury, Sunnymeads and Datchet. All of the stations are managed by South Western Railway, which operates all passenger trains. Most services run between Windsor & Eton Riverside station and London Waterloo via Richmond and Clapham Junction.

The line was promoted by the Windsor, Staines and South Western Railway (WSSWR). The first section, between Staines and Datchet, opened on 22 August 1848. It was extended to a temporary station at Windsor on 1 December 1849. The permanent terminus, now known as Windsor & Eton Riverside station, was designed by William Tite and opened on 1 May 1851. The London and South Western Railway, which had operated all passenger services from the outset, took over the WSSWR in June 1850. The Southern Railway was responsible for electrifying the line with the 750 V DC third-rail system in 1930.

== Infrastructure and services ==
The Staines–Windsor line is a railway line in Berkshire and Surrey, England. It runs for 6 miles 46 ch (10.6 km) from its terminus at Windsor & Eton Riverside station to an at-grade junction with the Waterloo–Reading line at the west end of Staines station, 19 mi 2 ch (30.6 km) down the line from London Waterloo. There are intermediate stations at Datchet, Sunnymeads and Wraysbury, and the maximum permitted speed is 60 mph (97 km/h). The line is electrified using the 750 V DC third-rail system and is double tracked throughout. Signalling is controlled by Basingstoke rail operating centre and Track Circuit Block is in operation. Between Windsor & Eton Riverside and Datchet stations, there are two level crossings and the line crosses the River Thames at Black Potts Railway Bridge.

The stations on the branch are managed by South Western Railway, which operates all services. All stations have two operational platforms each. (Note: Platform 2 at Wraysbury is the shortest on the line with a length of 165.5 m (543 ft).) The buffer stop at Windsor & Eton Riverside is 25 miles 48 ch (41.2 km) down the line from London Waterloo, when measured via Twickenham. The off-peak service pattern is two trains per hour in each direction calling at all stations between Windsor & Eton Riverside and Twickenham, then Richmond, Putney, Clapham Junction, Vauxhall and London Waterloo. Off-peak trains from Windsor & Eton Riverside typically reach Staines in around 15 minutes and London Waterloo in around 55 minutes.

Stations on the Staines–Windsor line (from west to east)
Station	Distance from Waterloo via Twickenham	Opened	Closed	Original name	Ref.
Windsor & Eton Riverside	25 mi 48 ch (41.2 km)	1 December 1849		Windsor	
Datchet	23 mi 63 ch (38.3 km)	22 August 1848		Datchett	
Sunnymeads	22 mi 48 ch (36.4 km)	10 July 1927			
Wraysbury	21 mi 40 ch (34.6 km)	22 August 1848			
Staines High Street	19 mi 24 ch (31.1 km)	1 July 1884	30 January 1916		

== History ==
=== Proposals and authorisation ===
The first proposal for a railway to Windsor was made by the Windsor, Slough and Staines Atmospheric Railway (WSSAR) company. Its engineer, Charles Vignoles, proposed two lines, one linking the town to Slough and the other to Staines, which would have crossed the Thames together at Romney Island. (Note: Under the plans drawn up by Charles Vignoles, the WSSAR line from Windsor to Slough would have been laid as broad gauge and the line to Staines would have been standard gauge. By crossing the River Thames at Romney Island, the lines would avoid having to run over land owned by the Crown.) A bill was prepared and was given its first reading in the House of Commons on 13 February 1846. After scrutiny by a select committee, Parliament declined to consider the scheme any further on 19 May of that year.

In the late 1840s, there was an intense rivalry between the London and South Western Railway (LSWR) and the Great Western Railway (GWR), both of which wanted to be first to open a railway to Windsor. The board of the WSSAR joined with representatives of the LSWR and the Staines and Richmond Railway, to propose a standard gauge line to Windsor via Staines. The new company, known as the Windsor, Staines and South Western Railway (WSSWR), employed Joseph Locke to design the new railway. Locke proposed two separate undertakings: a railway line from Richmond to Datchet via Staines and a loop line connecting Barnes and Hounslow. (Note: The loop line proposed by Locke to link Barnes and Hounslow was authorised by Parliament on 25 June 1847. He also proposed a line from Staines to Pirbright Junction via Chertsey.)

In early 1847, the GWR and WSSWR submitted separate bills to Parliament for railways to Windsor. The GWR bill was rejected on 11 June, but the second scheme was approved two weeks later in the Windsor, Staines, and South-western Railway Act (No. 1) 1847 (10 & 11 Vict. c. lviii). (Note: A condition of the parliamentary approval of the WSSWR was that the western terminus at Black Potts should be laid out so that it could be shared by a future branch from the Great Western Main Line.) Thomas Brassey was paid £111,700 to construct the WSSWR from Richmond to Datchet. The LSWR agreed to lease the line for a 4.5% capital return and payment of half of the operating profits.

=== Opening ===
The first section of the Staines–Windsor line opened on 22 August 1848. The temporary western terminus was at Datchet and passengers for Windsor were required to catch a stagecoach to complete their journeys. (Note: In 1848, the price of a one-way ticket for the stagecoach journey between Datchet and Windsor was 4 d.) The initial weekday service, operated by the LSWR, was 15 daily trains to London Waterloo and 12 trains to Windsor. A provisional agreement between the WSSWR and the Crown to continue the line to Windsor was reached that month, but was not formalised until 14 February 1849, by which time the extension was already under construction. (Note: Under the agreement formalised between the WSSWR and the Crown on 14 February 1849, the railway company agreed to pay £80,000 to fund the draining and landscaping of Windsor Great Park. The railway historian, H.P. White, suggests that Prince Albert was unwilling to approach parliament to fund the work.) Formal powers for the Datchet–Windsor section were granted on 26 June of that year.

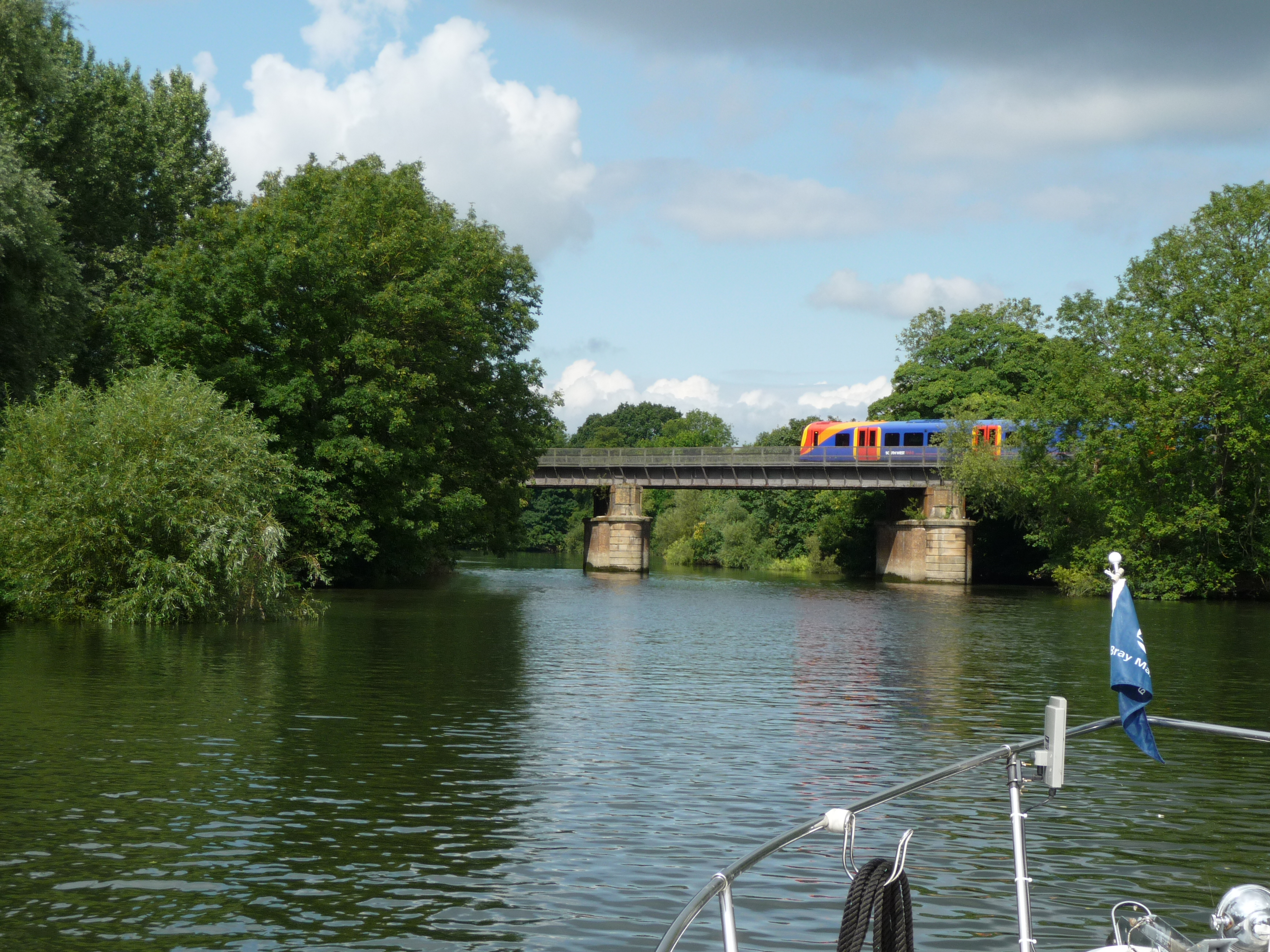
Black Potts Railway Bridge

The WSSWR hoped to be able to open the extension to Windsor during August 1849, but on the 9th of that month, a crack appeared in one of the girders of the Black Potts Railway Bridge, requiring urgent structural repairs. (Note: Black Potts Railway Bridge was designed by Joseph Locke and built by Thomas Brassey. The cracks detected in one of the girders on 9 August 1849 are thought to have been caused by the sinking of one of the piers. In 1892, further cracks were detected in the cast iron arched ribs, which were replaced by straight, wrought iron girders.) As a result of the delay, the GWR, which had obtained authorisation for its own line, opened the first railway station in Windsor on 8 October that year. The WSSWR finally opened its temporary terminus in Windsor on 1 December 1849.

Windsor & Eton Riverside station

The LSWR, which had leased the line from the outset, took over the WSSWR on 30 June 1850. The permanent terminus at Windsor opened on 1 May 1851. Designed by William Tite in the Tudor-Gothic style, it included a private waiting room provided for Queen Victoria and her attendants. The three 700 ft (210 m) platforms were spanned by a single roof and the enlarged signal box had 44 levers. Initially trains stopped outside of the trainshed to allow the locomotives to be detached, before the carriages were hauled by rope into the station. This practice ceased in June 1868, following an accident in which a set of carriages crashed into the buffer stop.

=== Later history ===
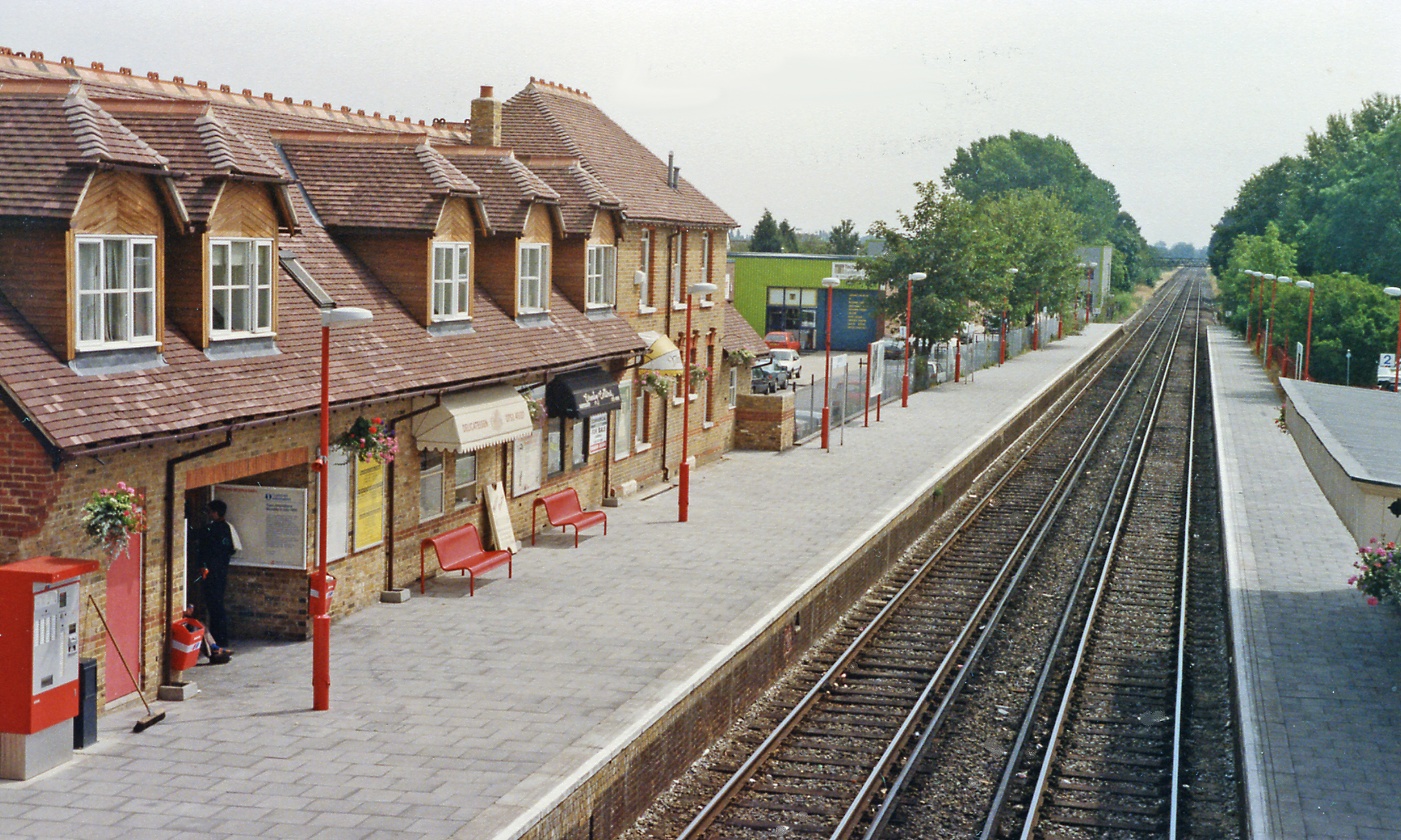
Datchet station

The two original intermediate stations on the line were rebuilt after their initial openings. In April 1861, Wraysbury station was resited around 26 chains (520 m) southeast of its original site. A new brick-built station building was opened at Datchet on 10 October 1888, replacing the original timber structure.

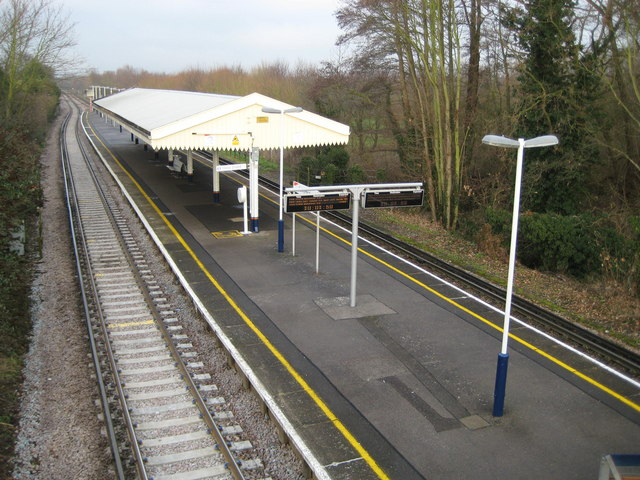
Sunnymeads station

The Staines West Curve was opened with Staines High Street station on 1 July 1884. It enabled direct trains to run between Windsor and Egham, without the need for reversal. From 1 May 1889, the service was extended southwestwards to Woking via Chertsey. By 1911, there were only four timetabled passenger trains using the curve on weekdays. Staines High Street station closed on 30 January 1916. The Staines West Curve was used again between 1921 and 1930 for a Windsor-Waterloo via Chertsey service, but the High Street station did not reopen. Sunnymeads station, configured with a single island platform, opened on 10 July 1927.

The electrification of the Staines–Windsor line was announced by the Southern Railway in June 1929, and the first electric trains began running on 6 July 1930. (Note: The electrification of the Staines–Windsor line was part of a wider electrification scheme that also included the lines from Hounslow and Whitton Junctions to Staines, Dartford to Gravesend, and Wimbledon to West Croydon. The total expenditure for all lines was £597,000 (equivalent to £30 million in 2025).) As part of the works, the platforms were lengthened at Staines and an electrical substation was installed at Datchet. The initial electric timetable included half-hourly services to Waterloo off-peak, with trains running non-stop east of Richmond. Additional services ran via Hounslow at peak times.

From summer 1936, 2-NOL electric multiple units worked the line, but were replaced by 4-SUB units in December 1957. The latter had a brief tenure on the line, being replaced by Class 415 units the following May. Class 414 units were also used on the line from the late 1950s. Class 707 trains were introduced in August 2017 and the first Class 701 units ran in passenger service on the line in January 2024.

Between 1897 and 1940, coal was delivered from the Staines–Windsor line to the Metropolitan Water Board pumping station in London Road, Staines, via a 3/4 mi (1.2 km) private siding. The goods yards on the line closed in the early 1960s; the shutting of the yard at Wraysbury in 1962, was followed by the closure of the signal box in March 1965. A major resignalling project took place in the mid-1970s, which resulted in the line being controlled from Feltham area signalling centre. The scheme was commissioned on 8 September 1974 and the signal box at Windsor and Eton Riverside closed the same day. Datchet signal box was retained for three months to operate the level crossing, but closed on 17 December 1974 when control was transferred to Feltham. A second major resignalling project took place in the early 2020s. when control of the line was transferred to Basingstoke rail operating centre.

=== Connections to the Staines and West Drayton line ===
The LSWR opposed a junction with the Staines & West Drayton Railway but three separate connections have existed. The earliest was through the sidings of the Staines Linoleum Company and would have required use of turntables or reversals to pass wagons between the lines. During the Second World War, a single-track spur was laid from just south of Yeoveney Halt to just west of the site of Staines High Street station, to provide an alternative should cross-London routes be blocked by bomb damage; this link existed from 23 June 1940 to 16 December 1947 but was little used. The last, laid in 1981 when the Staines West branch was severed by the M25 motorway, was to an oil terminal built in the former goods yard of Staines West station and lasted until 1991.

== Proposed enhancements ==
The AirTrack scheme, proposed in 2008 to provide a new link to Heathrow Airport, included a station near the site of the former Staines High Street station. The Windsor Link Railway also proposed a route for southern rail access to Heathrow, as well as linking the line to Slough via a tunnel in Windsor.

== Bibliography ==
- Brown, David (2009). Development of the London Suburban Network and Its Trains. Southern Electric. Vol. 1. Crowthorne: Capital Transport Publishing. ISBN 978-1-85-414330-3.
- Faulkner, J.N.; Williams, R.A. (1988). The London & South Western Railway in the 20th century. Newton Abbot: David & Charles. ISBN 978-0-71-538927-0.
- Hornby, Frank (1995). London Suburban. Peterborough: Silver Link Publishing. ISBN 978-1-85-794039-8.
- Jackson, Alan A. (1978). London's Local Railways. Newton Abbot: David & Charles. ISBN 978-0-71-537479-5.
- Jackson, Alan A. (1999). The railway in Surrey. Penryn: Atlantic Transport Publishers. ISBN 978-0-90-689990-8.
- Mindell, Ruth; Mindell, Jonathan (1985). Bridges over the Thames. Poole: Blandford Press. ISBN 978-0-71-371542-2.
- Mitchell, Vic; Smith, Keith (1988). Waterloo to Windsor via Richmond. Midhurst: Middleton Press. ISBN 978-0-90-652054-3.
- Quick, Michael (2023) [2001]. Railway Passenger Stations in Great Britain (PDF) (5.05 ed.). London: Railway and Canal Historical Society.
- South, Raymond (1978). Crown, College and Railways. Buckingham: Barracuda Books. ISBN 978-0-86-023071-7.
- White, H.P. (1992). Southern England. A regional history of the railways of Great Britain. Vol. II (5th ed.). ISBN 978-0-94-653777-8.
- Williams, R. A. (1968). The London & South Western Railway. Vol. 1: The formative years. Newton Abbot: David & Charles. ISBN 0-7153-4188-X.
- Williams, R. A. (1973). The London & South Western Railway. Vol. 2: Growth and Consolidation. Newton Abbot: David & Charles. ISBN 0-7153-5940-1.
- "Kent / Sussex / Wessex Routes Sectional Appendix" (PDF). Network Rail. 2009.
- "Delivering a better railway for a better Britain | Route Specifications: Wessex" (PDF). Network Rail. 2016.
