= Staines High Street railway station =

Former train stop in Surrey

Coordinates: 51.4353°N 0.5093°W

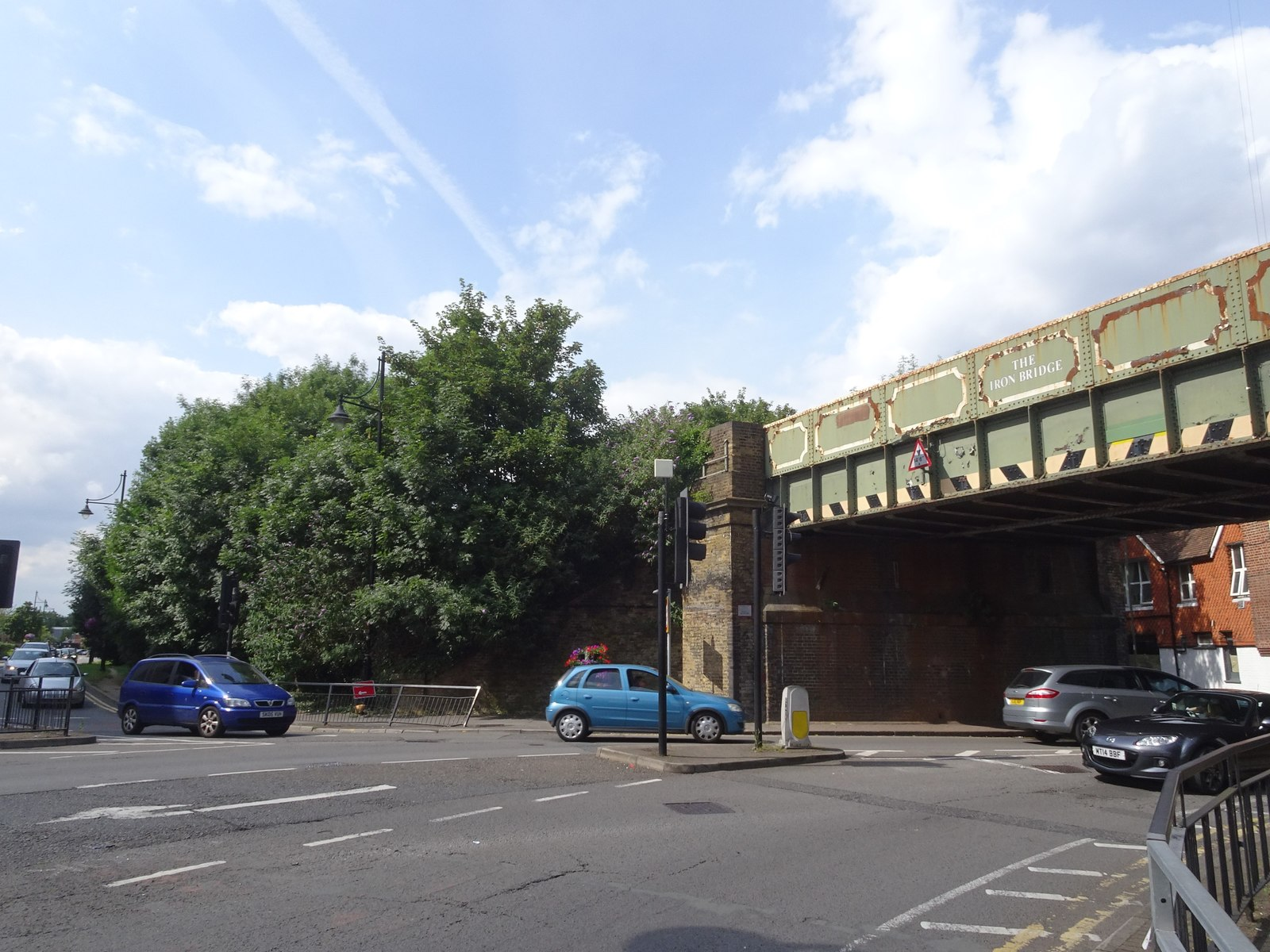
The site of Staines High Street railway station

Staines High Street railway station was a railway station that formerly served the town of Staines (now Staines-upon-Thames), on the Windsor & Eton line of the London and South Western Railway.

== History ==
The station was opened on 1 July 1884 and closed on 30 January 1916 It was built to serve Staines for trains to and from the west using a short chord connecting the Windsor line to the line from Staines to Reading.

When passenger services were removed, the chord remained in use for occasional freight traffic until 1965, after which the chord embankment was demolished. A car park stands on the site of the chord and no traces of the station remain.
