= Wokingham railway station =

Railway station in Berkshire, England

Wokingham
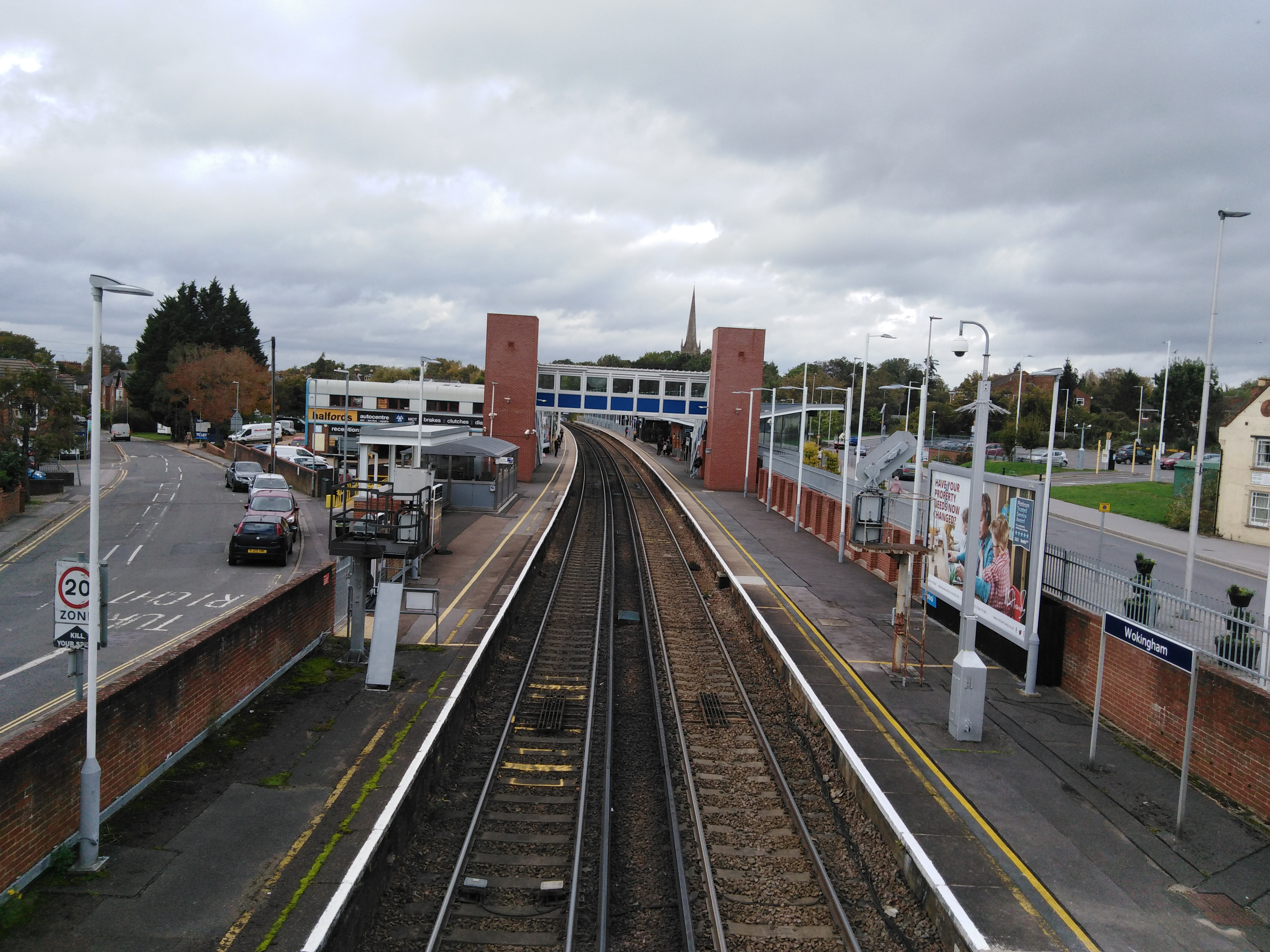

General information
- Location: Wokingham, District of Wokingham, England
- Coordinates: 51.411°N 0.843°W
- Grid reference: SU805686
- Manager: South Western Railway
- Platforms: 2

Other information
- Station code: WKM
- Classification: DfT category C2

History
- Original company: Reading, Guildford and Reigate Railway
- Pre-grouping: London and South Western Railway
- Post-grouping: Southern Railway

Key dates
- 4 July 1849: Station opened
- 1 January 1939: Line electrified
- 1973: Station rebuilt
- 1987: Platforms lengthened
- October 2013: New station building opened

Passengers
- 2020/21: ▼0.484 million
- Interchange: ▼23,467
- 2021/22: ▲1.281 million
- Interchange: ▲54,616
- 2022/23: ▲1.560 million
- Interchange: ▼52,270
- 2023/24: ▲1.652 million
- Interchange: ▲62,035
- 2024/25: ▲1.902 million
- Interchange: ▲73,552
Location
Notes
- Passenger statistics from the Office of Rail and Road

Wokingham railway station serves the market town of Wokingham, in Berkshire, England. It lies 62 miles 8 chains (62.10 mi; 99.9 km) down the line from London Charing Cross, via Redhill. The station is at the junction of the Waterloo–Reading line with the North Downs Line. South Western Railway manages the station and provides services along with Great Western Railway.

== History ==
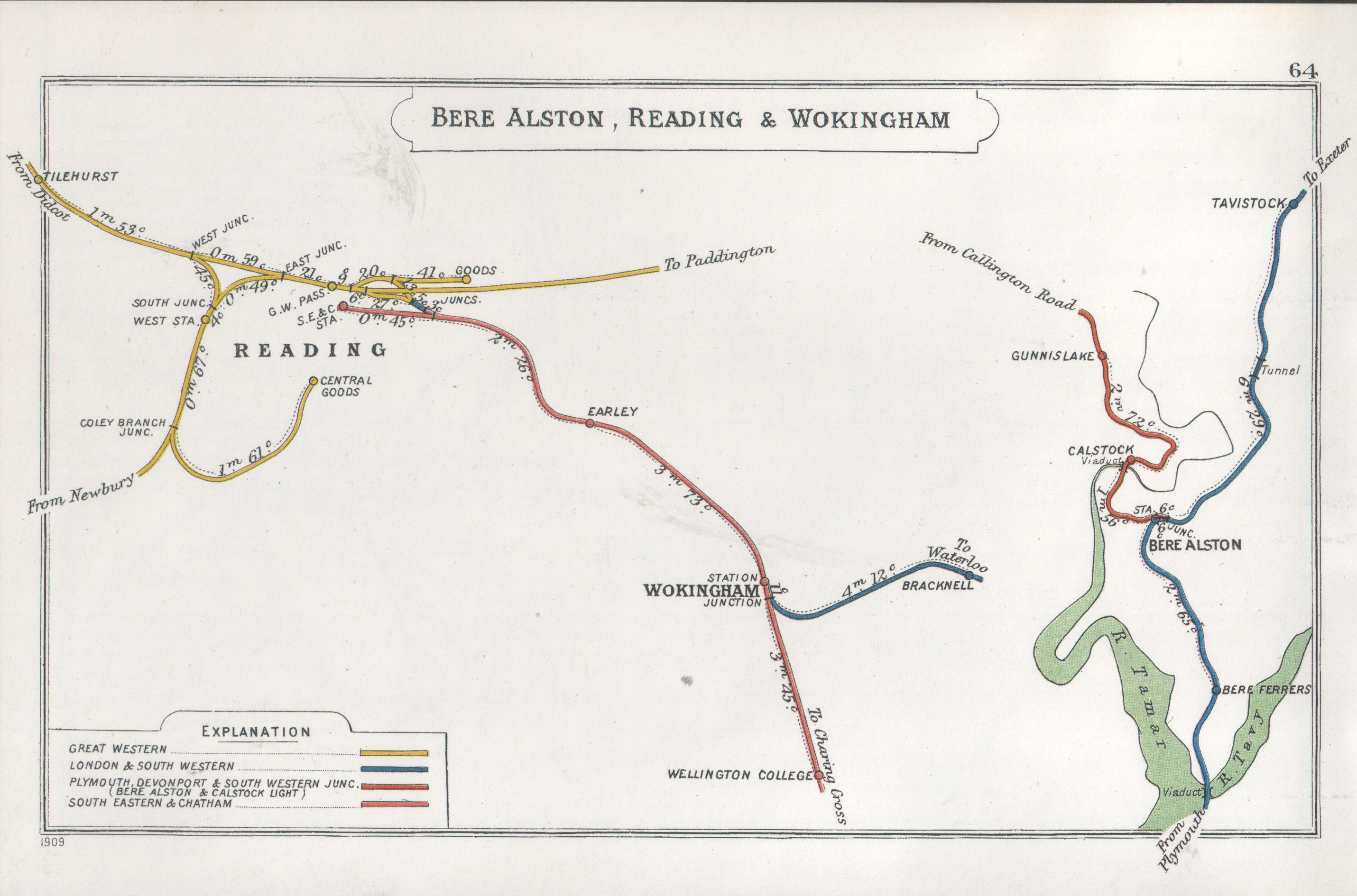
A 1909 Railway Clearing House map showing lines in the area of Wokingham

The station in 1978

The line from Reading Southern to Redhill was built by the Reading, Guildford and Reigate Railway (RG&RR), and was opened in stages. The first sections, from Reading to Farnborough North, which included a station at Wokingham, also from Dorking West to Redhill, were opened on 4 July 1849. Other sections followed, with the last section, from Guildford to Shalford, on 20 October 1849. From its beginning, the RG&RR was worked by the South Eastern Railway (SER), which bought the RG&RR in 1852.

The Staines, Wokingham & Woking Junction Railway (SW&WJR) opened a line between Staines and Wokingham (Staines Junction) on 9 July 1856. The London and South Western Railway worked the SW&WJR and was authorised to run over the SER to Reading. This gave Wokingham a direct route to London Waterloo.

In 1933, the Southern Railway (SR) opened a signal box, which controlled part of the North Downs Line, part of the Waterloo route and the level crossing. On 1 January 1939, the SR extended its Waterloo–Virginia Water electric service to Wokingham and Reading.

In 1973, British Rail (BR) replaced Wokingham's station building with one built with CLASP prefabricated concrete sections. In 1987, BR slightly extended the platforms to accommodate eight-car Waterloo trains. Platform 2 (down) has recently undergone a further extension to accommodate longer trains and the addition of a signal at the London end. This is for reversing trains in times of disruption and during the Reading station upgrade. The level crossing adjacent to the station was modernised with lifting barriers in 1976.

In 2011, it was announced that Wokingham station would be redeveloped from spring 2012 to spring 2013 at a cost of £6 million. The initial plan involved the building of a new station building further along the platform, nearer to Reading than the existing building, and creating a new spur road linking Wellington Road to the Reading Road.

Enabling work for the link road was started on 11 February 2013. In August 2013, the new footbridge was opened to the public and, in October the same year, the new station building was opened, with the old 1973 CLASP building being demolished to make way for the new station sign and clock tower. However, following the development, South West Trains chose a new café chain to serve in the new building in place of that which had served in the old building, despite local opposition.

Automatic ticket gates were installed at the station in early 2019.

In February 2024, Network Rail closed the signal box as part of a £375 million resignalling scheme in the Feltham and Wokingham area, with control moving to the Basingstoke Rail operating centre.

=== Footbridge ===
At the southern end of the station, there is a footbridge over the railway made from old sections of rail. The footbridge is over 130 years old and was built after two deaths at the station's level crossing in 1886. It is now Grade II listed and is believed to be the only one of its type left in the UK. In 2017, various defects were found in the bridge's structure and Network Rail started restoration work in 2021, after initially having a planning application rejected.

== Services ==
Wokingham is served by two train operating companies; the typical off-peak service in trains per hour (tph) is:

South Western Railway:

- 2 tph to London Waterloo, via Richmond
- 2 tph to Reading (stopping service).

Great Western Railway:

- 2 tph to Gatwick Airport, via Guildford
- 2 tph to Reading (non-stop).

Additional services call at the station during peak hours. On Sundays, only one eastbound train per hour runs to Gatwick Airport, with one train per hour running only as far as Redhill.

Preceding station	National Rail	Following station
Bracknell	South Western Railway Waterloo to Reading Line	Winnersh
Crowthorne	Great Western Railway North Downs Line	Reading
Crowthorne	Great Western Railway North Downs Line	Winnersh Limited Service
