= Datchet railway station =

Railway station in Berkshire, England

Coordinates: 51°28′59.23″N 0°34′47.10″W

Datchet
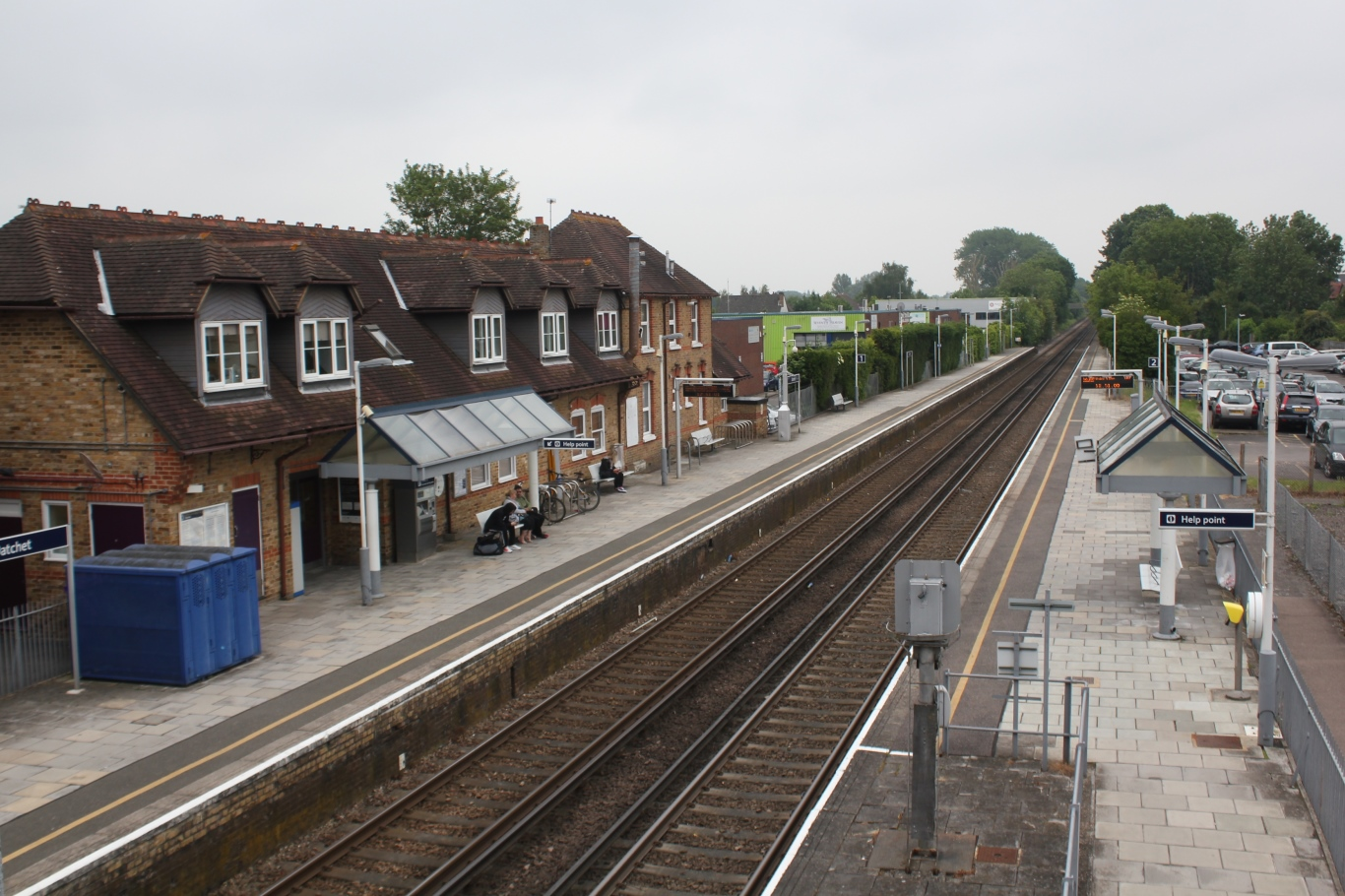
- Datchet railway station, viewed from the footbridge.

General information
- Location: Datchet, Royal Borough of Windsor and Maidenhead; England
- Grid reference: SU987769
- Managed by: South Western Railway
- Platforms: 2

Other information
- Station code: DAT
- Classification: DfT category E

History
- Opened: 22 August 1848

Passengers
- 2020/21: ▼62,642
- 2021/22: ▲0.174 million
- 2022/23: ▲0.218 million
- 2023/24: ▼0.200 million
- 2024/25: ▲0.228 million
Location
Notes
- Passenger statistics from the Office of Rail and Road

Datchet railway station serves the village of Datchet in Berkshire, England. It is 23 miles 63 chains (38.3 km) down the line from London Waterloo, on the Staines to Windsor & Eton Line.

The station has two side platforms linked by a pedestrian footbridge, and the principal station buildings are to be found on the London bound platform. The station has a central location within Datchet village, and two level crossings cross the line immediately to the west of the station. The presence of these crossings, which carry both road routes from the village to the nearby town of Windsor, can cause traffic delays in the village.

== History ==
The Windsor, Staines & South Western railway was authorised to build a railway line to Windsor in 1847, however Datchet was the temporary terminus after the line was opened from Richmond on 22 August 1848. The finally completed route over the River Thames was opened on 1 December 1849.

The original station had goods facilities on both up and down sides but these were eventually closed by 17 January 1965. This area is now a car park on the down side and industrial units on the up side. The large goods shed next to the station master's house was also demolished in the early 1990s. The up side station building was burnt down in a fire in September 1986 but was rebuilt in a more basic style coupled with flats above it. The station masters house survived and is the only surviving structure left.

The down side wooden building has also been lost. Datchet had a manual signal box which also worked the manual level crossing gates, this and Mays crossing box closed in December 1974 when control was taken over by Feltham power box, this led to the replacement of the manual barriers with the lifting ones we have today.

The ticket office is now open Monday-Friday between 06:15 and 13:05 & Saturday from 07:55 to 14:45 whereas previously it was weekdays peak hours only. In recent years the platforms have been raised and more modern lighting erected. The most recent development has been the relaying of both down & up lines through the station replacing some very worn permanent way.

== Services ==
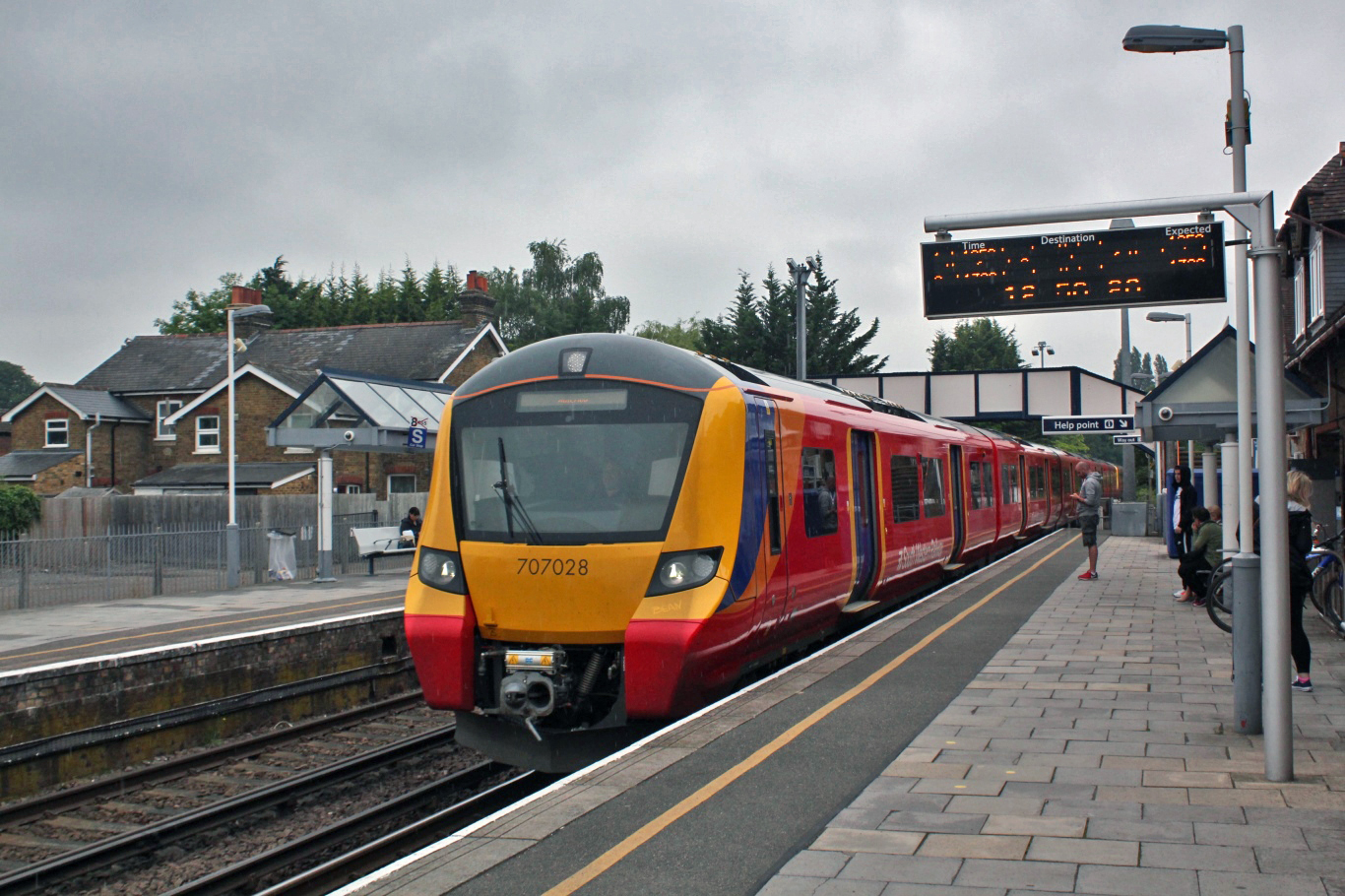
A South Western Railway Class 707 on a London-bound service

All services at Datchet are operated by South Western Railway.

The typical off-peak service on all days of the week is two trains per hour in each direction between Windsor & Eton Riverside and London Waterloo via Richmond.

Preceding station	National Rail	Following station
Sunnymeads	South Western Railway Staines to Windsor Line	Windsor & Eton Riverside
