= Windsor & Eton Riverside railway station =

Railway station in Berkshire, England

Coordinates: 51°29′08.01″N 0°36′23.36″W

Windsor & Eton Riverside
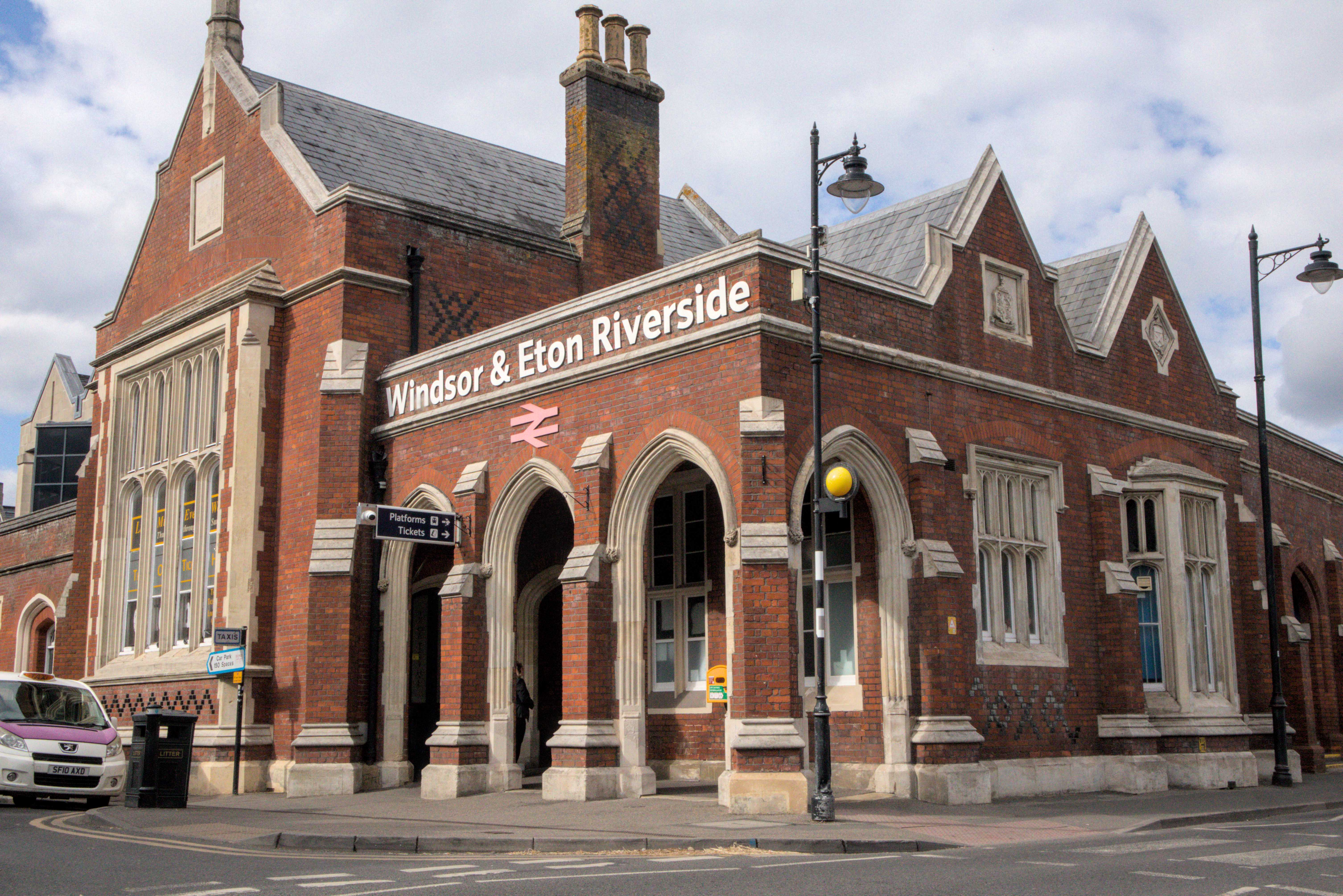
- The station's booking hall and main entrance, taken from Datchet Road

General information
- Location: Windsor, Royal Borough of Windsor and Maidenhead; England
- Grid reference: SU968772
- Managed by: South Western Railway
- Platforms: 2

Other information
- Station code: WNR
- Classification: DfT category C1

History
- Opened: 1 December 1849

Passengers
- 2020/21: ▼0.230 million
- Interchange: ▼12,132
- 2021/22: ▲0.787 million
- Interchange: ▲24,001
- 2022/23: ▲1.058 million
- Interchange: ▲42,234
- 2023/24: ▼1.028 million
- Interchange: ▼35,833
- 2024/25: ▲1.143 million
- Interchange: ▼29,022
Location
Notes
- Passenger statistics from the Office of Rail and Road

Windsor & Eton Riverside station is a station in Windsor, Berkshire, England. The station, close to the River Thames and Windsor Castle, is a Grade II listed building. It is 25 miles 48 chains (41.2 km) down the line from London Waterloo and is the terminus of the Staines to Windsor Line, served by South Western Railway.

The station is also in close proximity to Windsor's other station, Windsor & Eton Central, which is served by Great Western Railway trains from Slough on the Windsor branch of the Great Western Main Line.

== Description ==
The station building was designed by William Tite as a royal station with a stone-faced frontage with a mullioned and transomed main window, gables and a multi-arch entrance. The main booking hall was decorative but is now a wine bar. There is a spacious concourse under the train shed at the head of the platforms. The two platforms extend a considerable distance beyond the train shed.

The wall on the southeast (Datchet Road) side of the station forms a long curve, parallel with the platform, containing a series of arches with depressed heads. This wall links the station proper with the former Royal Waiting Room built for Queen Victoria. This is a small building of main room and ante rooms crowned by a turret with spirelet, and has Tudor arched windows. The interior of the main room has a ribbed ceiling with a pendant finial.

== History ==
The route from Staines was authorised in 1847 and was opened by the Windsor, Staines and South Western Railway as far as Datchet, on the opposite side of Home Park from the town of Windsor, on 22 August 1848. Opposition from both Windsor Castle and Eton College delayed the completion of the line (there was similar opposition to the Great Western Railway line to Windsor Central), but eventually the Riverside station was opened on 1 December 1849.

In 1848 before Riverside station opened, the Windsor, Staines and South Western Railway had been incorporated into the London and South Western Railway (LSWR), which ran the services until 1923 when, under the railway grouping of the Railways Act 1921, the LSWR became part of the Southern Railway. In 1930 the line was electrified on the third rail system at a nominal 660 volts DC. In the 1948 nationalisation the line became part of the Southern Region of British Railways.

In 1974 the level crossing in the throat of the station giving access to Romney Lock was closed and replaced by a footbridge. Vehicular access to the lock was maintained by a road constructed on the north side of the station through the former goods yard which became the station car park.

As part of the privatisation of British Rail, the Stagecoach Group company South West Trains took over operation of the service and the station in 1996. Ownership of the line and station passed to Railtrack and subsequently to Network Rail.

== Windsor Link Railway ==
The Windsor Link Railway was a 2009 proposal for a new railway connecting the Great Western and South West Trains franchise areas and potentially linking both to Heathrow Airport. Windsor & Eton Central and Windsor & Eton Riverside railway stations would be replaced with one through-route station in the Windsor Goswells.

The proposal was rejected by the government in December 2018.

== Incidents ==
On 22 May 2009, the end carriage of the 06:15 departure derailed as the train pulled out of the station causing disruption to services for much of the day. No trains ran the full route, with an hourly service terminating at Datchet and all other trains terminating at Staines.

On 11 October 2009 the bogie of a DEMU (vehicle 60118), on "The Eton Rifles" tour, derailed on arrival at platform 1. The tour could not continue and passengers were sent out on the next timetabled train.

On 30 January 2015, a Class 458/5 operated by South West Trains was damaged by fire following severe electrical arcing which occurred shortly after departing Windsor & Eton Riverside. The train's guard was taken to hospital suffering from smoke inhalation.

== Services ==
There is usually a half-hourly service to London Waterloo seven days a week, taking just under an hour to reach Waterloo. The service is currently provided by South Western Railway.

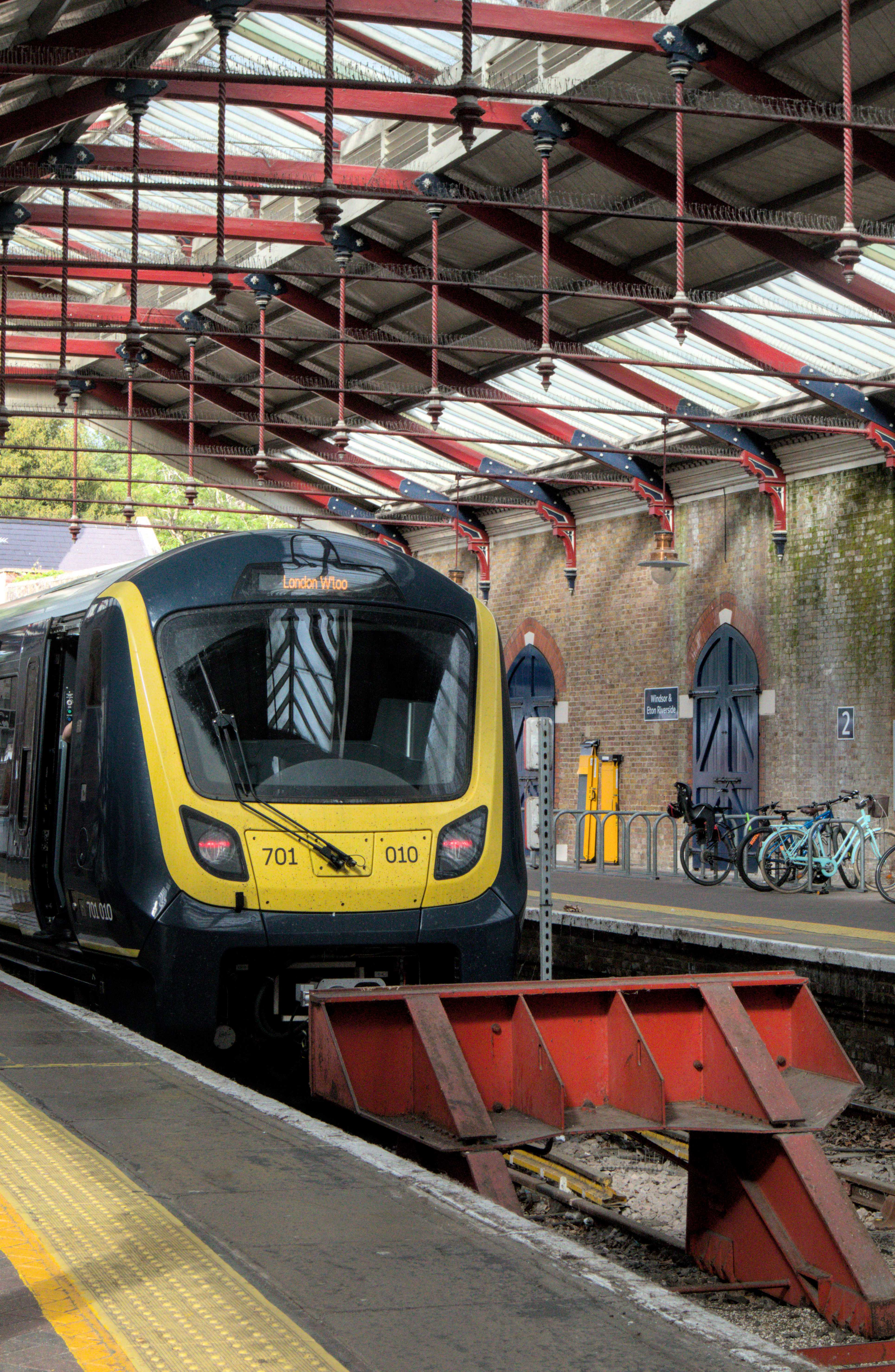
An SWR Arterio Service sat ready to leave for London Waterloo

Preceding station	National Rail	Following station
Datchet	South Western Railway; Windsor Line	Terminus

== Bibliography ==
- Mitchell, Victor; Smith, Keith (1988). Waterloo to Windsor (Southern Main Lines). Middleton Press. ISBN 0-906520-54-1.
