= South Western Railway (2017–2025) =

Former British train operating company

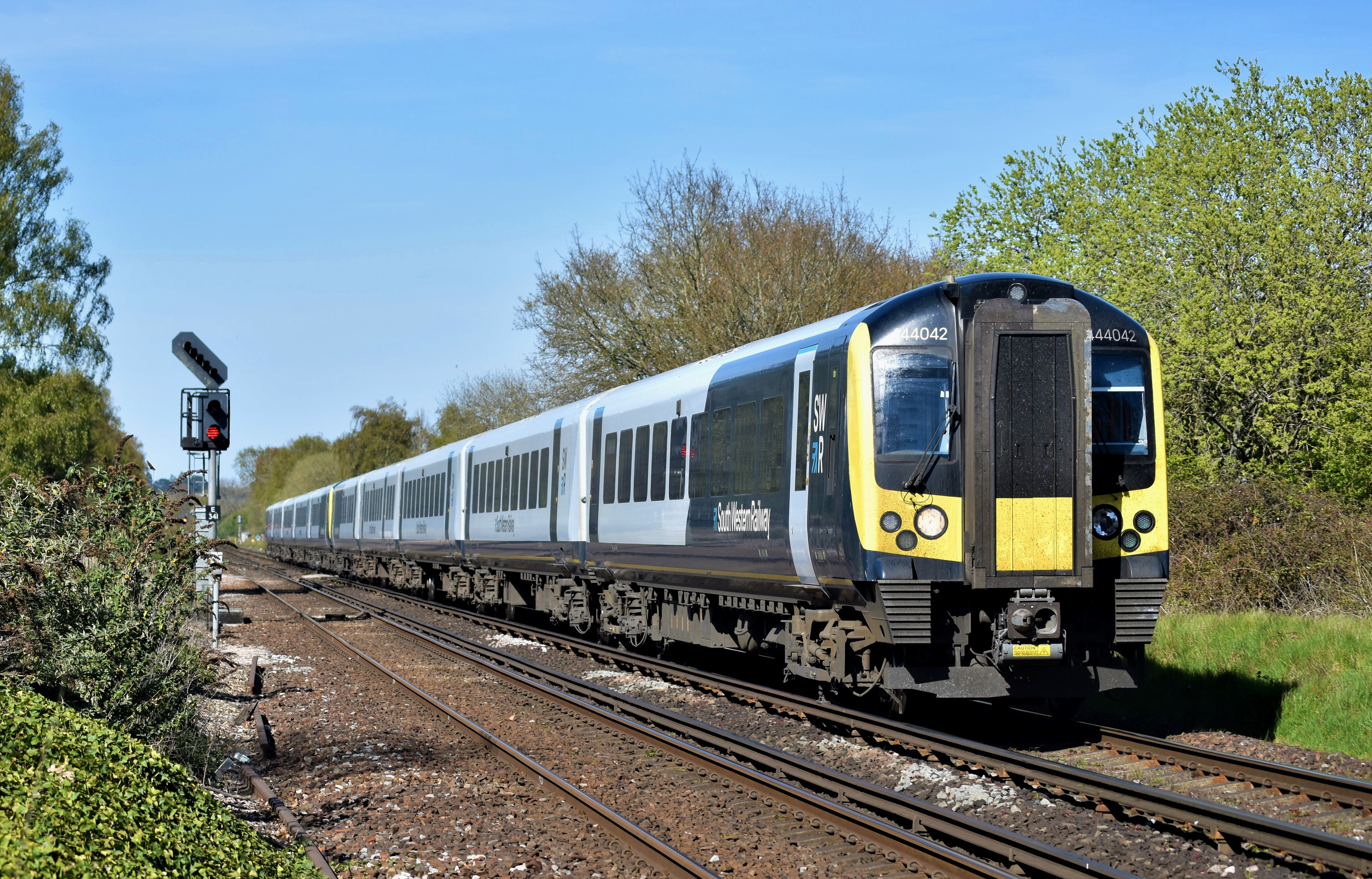
- A South Western Railway Class 444 near Southampton Airport Parkway in 2021

Overview
- Franchises: South Western; 20 August 2017 – 25 May 2025
- Main regions: Greater London; South East England; South West England
- Fleet: Class 158 Express Sprinter; Class 159 South Western Turbo; Class 444 Desiro; Class 450 Desiro; Class 455; Class 458 Juniper; Class 484 D-Train; Class 701 Arterio
- Parent company: FirstGroup (70%); MTR Corporation (30%)
- Reporting mark: SW
- Predecessor: South West Trains
- Successor: South Western Railway

Other
- Website: www.southwesternrailway.com

First MTR South Western Trains Limited, trading as South Western Railway (SWR), was a British train operating company owned by FirstGroup (70%) and MTR Corporation (30%) which operated the South Western franchise between August 2017 and May 2025.

On 20 August 2017, SWR took over South Western franchise operations from the previous franchisee, Stagecoach-owned South West Trains.

SWR operated commuter services from its Central London terminus at London Waterloo to south west London, suburban services in the counties of Surrey, Hampshire, Berkshire and Dorset, as well as regional services in Devon, Somerset and Wiltshire. Its subsidiary Island Line operated services on the Isle of Wight.

Rolling stock changes have included a comprehensive refurbishment of existing units and the acquisition of new-build Class 701 units from Bombardier to replace SWR's Class 455, and Class 707 multiple units. The Class 483 fleet operated on the Island Line was also replaced by the Class 484 during 2021.

During April 2018, amid concerns of SWR's performance, the Transport Secretary, Chris Grayling, announced an independent review into SWR and Network Rail. Between 2 December 2019 and 2 January 2020, the National Union of Rail, Maritime and Transport Workers (RMT) undertook 27 days of strikes. Further industrial action by SWR's staff was undertaken in 2022. In response to the decrease in passenger travel caused by the COVID-19 pandemic, SWR had considerably curtailed its services by mid-2020. In January 2020, SWR announced that they were in discussions with the government regarding the future of the franchise. In December 2020, it was announced that SWR's franchise would be abolished and replaced by a shorter management contract. In February 2023, the contract was extended to May 2025. In December 2024, the government announced that SWR's contract would not be renewed in 2025, and on 25 May 2025, the service was renationalised.

== History ==
During July 2015, the Department for Transport (DfT) abandoned efforts to negotiate an extension with the incumbent operator of the South Western franchise, South West Trains, (owned by British transport conglomerate Stagecoach) and announced that the South Western franchise would be re-tendered for in the coming years. This outcome was viewed by several industry commentators as being unexpected and inconvenient in its timing; the periodical Rail speculated that Stagecoach's rejection had been largely due to government officials feeling that the state was not receiving a sufficiently large share of the profits being generated by the franchise.

In February 2016, the DfT announced that two companies, FirstGroup and Stagecoach, had been shortlisted to bid for the next South Western franchise. During June 2016, MTR Corporation partnered with FirstGroup in its bid, taking a 30% shareholding in the joint venture. During July 2016, the DfT issued the Invitation to Tender.

=== Franchise award ===
During March 2017, the DfT announced that the South Western franchise had been awarded to First/MTR. At the time, it was stated that its franchise period was to commence from 20 August 2017 and run through to 18 August 2024, although the deal had included an option for the DfT to extend it for a further 48 weeks.

The Competition & Markets Authority (CMA) held an inquiry into the awarding; during July 2017, it sought undertakings from First/MTR that it would not abuse its monopoly on services to the West of England, Dorset and Somerset, as FirstGroup also operated the Greater Western franchise in those regions. FirstGroup and MTR responded with an offer to implement a cap upon unregulated fares between London and Exeter as a mitigating measure; the CMA chose to accept this concession. On 20 August 2017, First/MTR took over South Western franchise operations, with services branded as South Western Railway (SWR).

By April 2018, concerns had reportedly grown over SWR's performance over previous months; there had been a noted rise in both the number of delayed services and outright cancellations. Due to these concerns, the Transport Secretary, Chris Grayling, announced an independent review into the performance of South Western Railway and Network Rail; the review was welcomed by Winchester's MP, Steve Brine. During July 2018, reports emerged that FirstGroup/MTR were in the process of renegotiating the SWR contract, allegedly due to the operator's inability to deliver on many of its promised improvements, as well as its declining performance and industrial action by its own staff.

Between 2 December 2019 and 2 January 2020, the National Union of Rail, Maritime and Transport Workers (RMT) undertook 27 days of strikes. These were in protest to the potential introduction of DOO (driver only operation) on SWR's new fleet of Bombardier-built Class 701 multiple units, which would thereby nullify the role of the guard.

In January 2020, SWR announced that they were in discussions with the government regarding the future of the franchise following a £137 million loss, with termination of the contract being a possibility.

By mid-2020, SWR had considerably curtailed its services in response to the significant decline of passenger travel amid the COVID-19 pandemic. From 15 June 2020, both passengers and staff on public transport in England, including SWR services, were required to wear face coverings while travelling, and that anyone failing to do so would be liable to be refused travel or fined.

In December 2020, it was announced that terms for the abolition of the franchise system for SWR had been agreed, and that the company would be given a management contract to run until 1 April 2023 when the ERMA (Emergency Recovery Measures Agreement) for the franchise ends in March 2021. During October 2021, the contract was updated with a finish date of 28 May 2023, with an option to extend further if required by the DfT. In February 2023, the contract was further extended until May 2025.

SWR is one of several train operators impacted by the 2022–2024 United Kingdom railway strikes, which were the first national rail strikes in the UK for three decades. Its workers were amongst those participating in industrial action due to a dispute over pay and working conditions. The number of staff involved allowed SWR to remain capable of operating a minimal timetable on any of the planned dates for the strikes.

=== State ownership ===
In December 2024, after the Starmer government passed legislation to re-nationalise passenger rail in Great Britain, the government announced that the South Western rail area would be taken back into state ownership following the expiry of South Western Railway's contract. South Western Railway was the first area to be re-nationalised. The DfT Operator owned South Western Railway Limited took over from SWR on 25 May 2025.

== Services ==
South Western Railway was the main operator for western Surrey, Hampshire, Dorset and the Isle of Wight, and also served Greater London, Berkshire, Wiltshire, Somerset and Devon.

Most SWR services ran on electrified lines using the 750 V DC third rail system. There was a diesel fleet for services on the West of England line to Salisbury and Exeter, using the unelectrified track beyond Worting Junction just west of Basingstoke, and for Salisbury to Southampton via Romsey services which also serve Eastleigh.

From London Waterloo, SWR's London terminus, long-distance trains ran to southern England, including the major coastal population centres of Portsmouth, Southampton, Bournemouth, Poole and Weymouth. There were also trains to Reading and Exeter, but these were not the principal fast services from London to those cities, which are operated from London Paddington by Great Western Railway. The majority of its passengers were on suburban commuter lines in inner and south-west London, Surrey, east Berkshire, and north-east Hampshire.

As with most rail companies, non-folding bicycles were banned from peak-time trains to and from London. However, these restrictions applied only to cyclists boarding or alighting in the area bounded by Hook, Alton, Guildford, Reading and Dorking, in order to maximise available passenger space on the most crowded trains.

=== Mainline services ===
SWR operated regular services on four mainline routes:

- The South West Main Line (SWML) runs between London (Waterloo station) and the town of Weymouth; the route passes through several large towns and cities, including Woking, Basingstoke, Winchester, Southampton, Bournemouth, Poole and Dorchester. South Western Railway operates trains along the entire length of the line. Almost all trains operated by the company start from or terminate at London Waterloo with the exception of a Winchester - Bournemouth / Poole stopping service; these include semi-fast services to/from Southampton and Poole, and express services to/from Weymouth. There are also trains to and from Portsmouth; these trains branch off the SWML at Eastleigh, then proceed via the Eastleigh to Fareham and West Coastway lines to Portsmouth Harbour station.
- The Portsmouth Direct line (PDL) branches off the SWML at Woking and runs to Portsmouth via Guildford, Haslemere, Petersfield and Havant. South Western Railway operates all passenger trains on this route; these include fast and semi-fast services between London and Portsmouth, and semi-fast services as far as Haslemere.
- The West of England line (WEL) is the only mainline route that is not fully electrified. It leaves the SWML at Basingstoke and runs to Exeter via Andover, Salisbury, Gillingham and Yeovil. South Western Railway is the only operator on the line, with most services running between London and either Salisbury or Exeter St Davids. Some peak-time services terminate at various other destinations on the line, including Gillingham and Yeovil Pen Mill.
- The Alton line leaves the SWML at Brookwood (just after Woking) and runs to Alton via Aldershot and Farnham. It is the shortest of the four mainline routes and as such it is sometimes considered an outer suburban route instead (however for ticketing purposes, it is classed as a mainline route). Services usually run the full length of the line between London and Alton, though some services terminate at Farnham.

In total, there were 14 mainline trains per hour departing London Waterloo in the off-peak; this number increased in the peak hours. The majority of mainline services were operated by Class 444 or Class 450 EMUs, except for the West of England Main Line which were always operated by Class 158 or Class 159 DMUs (because it is unelectrified) and the Alton Line which also saw the occasional use of Class 458 units.

=== Metro and Suburban services ===
South Western Railway also operated many suburban "Metro" services in and around London. These all ran between London Waterloo and Clapham Junction, where they split into two separate routes: via Putney and via Wimbledon. All services on the suburban part of the network were operated by Class 450, Class 455, Class 458 and Class 701 electric multiple units.

==== Via Putney ====
The main route via Putney is known as the Waterloo to Reading Line. It runs between London and Reading and passes through towns such as Staines-upon-Thames, Ascot and Bracknell. It operates as a fast service as far as Staines, with Reading trains only calling at Clapham Junction, Richmond, Twickenham and Feltham. Branch lines on this route include:

- The Hounslow Loop Line, which leaves the main line at Barnes, runs via Brentford and rejoins the line between Whitton and Feltham (with junctions in both directions). Most services on the branch run either between London and Weybridge (described below), or run in a loop from Waterloo to Waterloo via Brentford, Whitton and Richmond (these services run both clockwise and anticlockwise).
- The Kingston Loop Line, which branches off at Twickenham, runs via Kingston and joins the South West Main Line at New Malden. Most services on this line run in an anticlockwise loop, from Waterloo to Waterloo, via Putney, Strawberry Hill, Kingston and Wimbledon.
  - There is also a branch line to Shepperton, however, this is only served by Putney trains at peak times.
- The Staines to Windsor Line, which branches off the main line at Staines-upon-Thames and runs to Windsor & Eton Riverside station. Most services run semi-fast between London and Windsor.
- The Chertsey Branch Line, which leaves the main line at Virginia Water and runs to Weybridge. Most services on the line run between London and Weybridge via the Hounslow Loop Line; a few services are extended beyond Weybridge, to and from Woking.
- The Ascot to Guildford Line, which is only served by through trains at peak times; these services run between London and Aldershot.

A total of 12 trains per hour ran between London Waterloo and Putney in the off-peak; this number increased in peak hours.

==== Via Wimbledon ====
The main route via Wimbledon used the slow tracks of the quadruple-track SWML. Suburban trains ran along the mainline between London and Woking. Branch lines on this route included:

- The Mole Valley Line, which branches off the main line at Raynes Park and runs via Epsom to Leatherhead, where the branch line itself splits into two lines: one to Guildford and one to Horsham via Dorking. SWR runs regular services to both Guildford and Dorking; the section between Dorking and Horsham is operated by Southern.
  - The Chessington Branch Line branches off the Mole Valley Line at Motspur Park and runs to Chessington.
- The Kingston Loop Line, which leaves the SWML at New Malden, runs via Kingston and joins the Waterloo to Reading line at Twickenham. Most services on this line run in a clockwise loop, from Waterloo to Waterloo, via Wimbledon, Kingston, Strawberry Hill and Putney.
  - The Shepperton Branch Line, which branches off the Kingston Loop Line at Teddington. Most services on the branch line run between Waterloo and Shepperton via Wimbledon.
- The Hampton Court Branch Line, which leaves the main line at Surbiton and runs directly to Hampton Court.
- The New Guildford Line, which also branches off at Surbiton, running to Guildford via Claygate. The line joins the Guildford branch of the Mole Valley Line at Effingham Junction.

A total of 16 trains per hour ran between London Waterloo and Wimbledon in the off-peak; this number increased in peak hours.

=== Other services ===
Routes that did not start or terminate at London Waterloo include:

- The Ascot to Guildford Line, which runs between Ascot and Guildford via Aldershot. Most services on the line run only between Ascot and Guildford, with no extension in either direction; however, some peak-time services do run between London and Farnham via Ascot. The shuttle services are usually operated by Class 450 units.
- The western section of the West Coastway Line between Portsmouth and Southampton. Class 450 units are usually in operation on this route.
- The Eastleigh to Romsey Line between Romsey and Eastleigh. Services on the line are extended beyond Eastleigh to and from Salisbury via Southampton Central and Romsey, in effect calling at Romsey twice. These services are operated using Class 158 units.
- The Wessex Main Line between Salisbury and Southampton. Services are extended beyond Southampton via the Eastleigh to Romsey Line, as described above.
- The Lymington Branch Line between Brockenhurst and Lymington Pier runs every 30 minutes between these two stations. These services are operated using a single Class 450 unit.
- The Island Line on the Isle of Wight, between Ryde Pier Head and Shanklin. These services are operated using Class 484 units, converted from London Underground D78 Stock.

=== Service table ===
As of December 2023, its routes off-peak Monday to Friday, with frequencies in trains per hour (tph), included:

South West Main Line
| Route | tph | Calling at |
|---|---|---|
| London Waterloo to Woking | 2 | Vauxhall; Clapham Junction; Earlsfield; Wimbledon; Surbiton; Esher; Hersham; Walton-on-Thames; Weybridge; Byfleet & New Haw; West Byfleet |
| London Waterloo to Basingstoke | 2 | Clapham Junction (Note: Passengers may only board services from London. Passengers may both board and alight services to Waterloo.) (1tph); Surbiton; Walton-on-Thames; Weybridge; Woking; Brookwood; Farnborough (Main); Fleet; Winchfield; Hook |
| London Waterloo to Portsmouth Harbour via Winchester | 1 | Woking; Farnborough (Main); Basingstoke; Micheldever; Winchester; Eastleigh; Hedge End; Botley; Fareham; Portchester; Cosham; Hilsea; Fratton; Portsmouth & Southsea |
| Winchester (and Southampton Central) to Bournemouth | 1 | Shawford; Eastleigh; Southampton Airport Parkway; Southampton Central; Totton; Ashurst New Forest; Beaulieu Road; Brockenhurst; Sway; New Milton; Hinton Admiral; Christchurch; Pokesdown; Services to Bournemouth start from Southampton Central. |
| London Waterloo to Poole | 1 | Clapham Junction; Basingstoke; Winchester; Southampton Airport Parkway; Southampton Central; Brockenhurst; New Milton; Christchurch; Pokesdown; Bournemouth; Branksome; Parkstone; This route splits/merges at Bournemouth with the route to Weymouth, see below. |
| London Waterloo to Weymouth | 1 | Woking; Winchester; Southampton Airport Parkway; Southampton Central; Brockenhurst; Bournemouth; Branksome; Parkstone; Poole; Hamworthy; Wareham; Dorchester South |
| London Waterloo to Weymouth | 1 | Clapham Junction; Basingstoke; Winchester; Southampton Airport Parkway; Southampton Central; Brockenhurst; New Milton; Christchurch; Pokesdown; Bournemouth; Poole; Hamworthy; Holton Heath; Wareham; Wool; Moreton; Dorchester South; Upwey; This route splits/merges at Bournemouth with the route to Poole, see above. |
Portsmouth Direct line
| Route | tph | Calling at |
| London Waterloo to Haslemere | 1 | Clapham Junction; Woking; Worplesdon; Guildford; Farncombe; Godalming; Milford; Witley |
| London Waterloo to Portsmouth Harbour via Guildford | 2 | Woking; Worplesdon; Guildford; Farncombe (1tph); Godalming; Haslemere; Liphook (1tph); Liss (1tph); Petersfield; Rowlands Castle (1tph); Havant; Bedhampton (1tph); Hilsea (1tph); Fratton; Portsmouth & Southsea; Farncombe, Liphook, Liss, Rowlands Castle, Bedhampton, and Hilsea are served by the same trains. |
West of England line
| Route | tph | Calling at |
| London Waterloo to Salisbury | 1 | Woking; Basingstoke; Overton; Whitchurch; Andover; Grateley; 2 trains extend to Yeovil Junction, calling at; Warminster, Westbury, Frome, Bruton, Castle Cary, and Yeovil Pen Mill.; 1 return train starts from Gillingham, calling at Tisbury. |
| London Waterloo to Exeter St Davids | 1 | Clapham Junction; Woking; Basingstoke; Andover; Salisbury; Tisbury; Gillingham; Templecombe; Sherborne; Yeovil Junction; Crewkerne; Axminster; Honiton; Feniton (1tp2h); Whimple (1tp2h); Cranbrook; Pinhoe; Exeter Central; Feniton and Whimple are served by alternating trains. |
Alton line
| Route | tph | Calling at |
| London Waterloo to Alton | 2 | Clapham Junction; Surbiton; West Byfleet; Woking; Brookwood; Ash Vale; Aldershot; Farnham; Bentley (1tph) |
Kingston Loop line
| Route | tph | Calling at |
| London Waterloo to London Waterloo via Kingston | 2 | Anticlockwise: Vauxhall; Queenstown Road; Clapham Junction; Wandsworth Town; Putney; Barnes; Mortlake; North Sheen; Richmond; St Margarets; Twickenham; Strawberry Hill; Teddington; Hampton Wick; Kingston...; Services continue to London Waterloo via New Malden (see below) |
| London Waterloo to London Waterloo via Kingston | 2 | Clockwise: Vauxhall; Clapham Junction; Earlsfield; Wimbledon; Raynes Park; New Malden; Norbiton; Kingston...; Services continue to London Waterloo via Richmond (see above) |
Waterloo to Reading
| Route | tph | Calling at |
| London Waterloo to Reading | 2 | Clapham Junction; Richmond; Twickenham; Feltham; Staines; Egham; Virginia Water; Longcross; Sunningdale; Ascot; Martins Heron; Bracknell; Wokingham; Winnersh; Winnersh Triangle; Earley |
Staines to Windsor and Chertsey branch
| Route | tph | Calling at |
| London Waterloo to Windsor & Eton Riverside | 2 | Vauxhall; Clapham Junction; Putney; Richmond; Twickenham; Whitton; Feltham; Ashford; Staines; Wraysbury; Sunnymeads; Datchet |
| London Waterloo to Weybridge via Hounslow and Virginia Water | 2 | Vauxhall; Queenstown Road; Clapham Junction; Wandsworth Town; Putney; Barnes; Barnes Bridge; Chiswick; Kew Bridge; Brentford; Syon Lane; Isleworth; Hounslow; Feltham; Ashford; Staines; Egham; Virginia Water; Chertsey; Addlestone |
Mole Valley line and Chessington branch
| Route | tph | Calling at |
| London Waterloo to Chessington South | 2 | Vauxhall; Clapham Junction; Earlsfield; Wimbledon; Raynes Park; Motspur Park; Malden Manor; Tolworth; Chessington North |
| London Waterloo to Dorking | 1 | Vauxhall; Clapham Junction; Earlsfield; Wimbledon; Raynes Park; Motspur Park; Worcester Park; Stoneleigh; Ewell West; Epsom; Ashtead; Leatherhead; Box Hill & Westhumble |
| London Waterloo to Guildford via Epsom | 1 | Vauxhall; Clapham Junction; Earlsfield; Wimbledon; Raynes Park; Motspur Park; Worcester Park; Stoneleigh; Ewell West; Epsom; Ashtead; Leatherhead; Bookham; Effingham Junction; Horsley; Clandon; London Road (Guildford) |
Shepperton and Hampton Court branches
| Route | tph | Calling at |
| London Waterloo to Shepperton | 2 | Vauxhall; Clapham Junction; Wimbledon; Raynes Park; New Malden; Norbiton; Kingston; Hampton Wick; Teddington; Fulwell; Hampton; Kempton Park; Sunbury; Upper Halliford |
| London Waterloo to Hampton Court | 2 | Vauxhall; Clapham Junction; Earlsfield; Wimbledon; Raynes Park; New Malden; Berrylands; Surbiton; Thames Ditton |
New Guildford line
| Route | tph | Calling at |
| London Waterloo to Guildford via Cobham & Stoke d'Abernon | 2 | Vauxhall; Clapham Junction; Earlsfield; Wimbledon; Surbiton; Hinchley Wood; Claygate; Oxshott; Cobham & Stoke d'Abernon; Effingham Junction; Horsley; Clandon; London Road (Guildford) |
Ascot to Guildford
| Route | tph | Calling at |
| Ascot to Aldershot | 2 | Bagshot; Camberley; Frimley; Ash Vale |
| Guildford to Farnham | 2 | Wanborough; Ash; Aldershot |
West Coastway Line
| Route | tph | Calling at |
| Portsmouth & Southsea to Southampton Central | 1 | Fratton; Hilsea; Cosham; Portchester; Fareham; Swanwick; Bursledon; Hamble; Netley; Sholing; Woolston; Bitterne; St Denys |
Eastleigh to Romsey and Wessex Main Line
| Route | tph | Calling at |
| Romsey to Salisbury | 1 | Chandler's Ford; Eastleigh; Southampton Airport Parkway; Swaythling; St Denys; Southampton Central; Millbrook; Redbridge; Romsey; Mottisfont & Dunbridge; Dean |
Lymington branch
| Route | tph | Calling at |
| Brockenhurst to Lymington Pier | 2 | Lymington Town |
Island Line
| Route | tph | Calling at |
| Shanklin to Ryde Pier Head | 2 | Lake; Sandown; Brading; Ryde St John's Road; Ryde Esplanade; Services also call at Smallbrook Junction when the Isle of Wight Steam Railway is running services. |

=== Service improvements ===
Improvements promised under the 2017 contract were:

- Refurbished trains
- Journeys to London eight minutes faster from Southampton Central, nine minutes faster from Bournemouth, ten minutes faster from Exeter St Davids and 14 minutes faster from Weymouth
- Free Wi-Fi at all stations and on mainland trains
- 29 additional weekday and Saturday services between Portsmouth & Southsea and Southampton Central
- Hourly direct trains from Weymouth to Portsmouth to begin before 2019
- 35 additional weekday and Saturday services between Portsmouth & Southsea and London Waterloo
- More Sunday services
- Investment in stations, including improvements to Southampton Central station
- Live information on seating availability and crowding levels via a new mobile phone app

From May 2019, there was also an hourly Sunday service between Reading and Salisbury via Basingstoke (with trains running between morning and evening).

In August 2021, the company announced the launch of "assisted boarding points" at all 189 stations on its network, allowing disabled or elderly passengers to ask for assistance onboard trains with as little as ten minutes' notice. The scheme will include clear signage at stations, with QR codes allowing customers to send details of the assistance they require and their planned journey to staff, replacing older systems wherein assisted journeys had to be booked six hours to a day in advance.

== Rolling stock ==
South Western Railway inherited a fleet of Classes 158, 159, 444, 450, 455, 456, 458 and 707 from South West Trains, and subsequently re-introduced Class 442 trains which had operated on Gatwick Express after earlier service with South West Trains. The fleet for the Island Line, Class 484, entered service on 1 November 2021.

During March 2020, the Class 442 fleet was withdrawn. One year later, SWR decided that they would not be returned to service and their re-introduction has been cancelled. In March 2021, SWR announced it would be keeping 28 Class 458 units and will refurbish and reconfigure them to four carriages for planned deployment on the Portsmouth Direct Line instead of the Class 442.

In early 2024 it was announced that the plan to use the refurbished and reconfigured Class 458s on the Portsmouth Direct Line had been dropped, and that South Western Railway has no current plans to use the 458/4s.

On 24 June 2024 the first Class 458/4 entered public service, initially doing limited outer suburban routes such as London Waterloo to Weybridge via Addlestone.

Classes 455, 456 and 707 fleets were planned to be replaced by 30 five-car and 60 ten-car Class 701 units built at Bombardier's Derby Litchurch Lane Works, financed by ROSCO Rock Rail for £1 billion, for use on Reading, Windsor and London suburban services.

By June 2023, 42 of the 90 trains ordered had been accepted from Alstom. The trains began to be used for passengers in January 2024.

=== Fleet at end of franchise ===
| Family | Class | Image | Type | Top speed | | Number | Carriages | Routes | Built |
| Family | Class | Image | Type | mph | km/h | Number | Carriages | Routes | Built |
South Western Railway
| Sprinter | 158 Express Sprinter | | DMU | 90 | 145 | 8 | 2 | London Waterloo – Exeter St Davids; Romsey – Salisbury via Southampton Central | 1989–1992 |
| Sprinter | 159 South Western Turbo | | DMU | 90 | 145 | 29 | 3 | West of England, Heart of Wessex and Wessex Main Lines: London Waterloo – Exeter St Davids | 159/0: 1992–1993; 159/1: converted 2006–2007 |
| Siemens Desiro | 444 | | EMU | 100 | 160 | 45 | 5 | London Waterloo – Weymouth and Poole; London Waterloo – Portsmouth Harbour (shared with Class 450s); London Waterloo – Alton (shared with Class 450s); London Waterloo – Basingstoke (shared with Class 450s) | 2003–2004 |
| Siemens Desiro | 450 | | EMU | 100 | 160 | 127 | 4 | London Waterloo – Portsmouth Harbour, Alton, Basingstoke or Reading; Southampton Central – Portsmouth & Southsea; Brockenhurst – Lymington Pier; Winchester – Bournemouth; Outer suburban routes: London Waterloo – Windsor & Eton Riverside, Weybridge via Staines; London Waterloo via Hounslow; Ascot – Guildford; Some express and inner suburban services | 2002–2006 |
| BR Second Generation (Mark 3) | 455 | | EMU | 75 | 120 | 82 | 4 | Inner suburban routes: London Waterloo – Shepperton, Hampton Court, Woking; London Waterloo via Hounslow or Strawberry Hill; London Waterloo – Dorking, Guildford via Oxshott or Epsom, Chessington South, or Windsor & Eton Riverside | 1982–1985 |
| Alstom Coradia Juniper | 458/4 | | EMU | 75 | 120 | 20 | 5 | Outer suburban services: London Waterloo – Weybridge, Teddington or Windsor & Eton Riverside, Inner suburban services (Occasionally) | 2013–2016; (1998–2002 as 458/0); (2000–2001 as 460) |
| Alstom Coradia Juniper | 458/5 | | EMU | 75 | 120 | 20 | 5 | Outer suburban services: London Waterloo – Weybridge, Teddington or Windsor & Eton Riverside, Inner suburban services (Occasionally) | 2013–2016; (1998–2002 as 458/0); (2000–2001 as 460) |
| Bombardier Aventra | 701/0 Arterio | | EMU | 100 | 160 | 60 | 10 | Reading, Windsor and south west London suburban services | 2019–2024 |
| Bombardier Aventra | 701/5 Arterio | | EMU | 100 | 160 | 30 | 5 | Reading, Windsor and south west London suburban services | 2019–2024 |
Island Line
| Vivarail D-Train | 484 | | EMU | 60 | 100 | 5 | 2 | Island Line: Ryde Pier Head – Shanklin | 1978–1981 (as D78 Stock); Converted 2020–2021 |

=== Past fleet ===
Train types formerly operated by South Western Railway include:

- Class 483, all withdrawn from service on 3 January 2021 after 82 years of service, including their time with London Transport.
- Class 442, permanently withdrawn in March 2020.
- Class 456 withdrawn from service 17 January 2022.
- Class 455 withdrawn from service 20 March 2026.

| Family | Class | Image | Type | Top speed | | Carriages | Number | Routes operated | Built | Withdrawn | Notes |
| Family | Class | Image | Type | mph | km/h | Carriages | Number | Routes operated | Built | Withdrawn | Notes |
|---|---|---|---|---|---|---|---|---|---|---|---|
| 1938 tube stock | 483 | | EMU | 45 | 72 | 2 | 6 | Island Line | 1938 | 2020–2021 | Replaced by Class 484 |
| BR Second Generation (Mark 3) | 442 Wessex Electrics | | EMU | 100 | 160 | 5 | 18 | London Waterloo – Portsmouth Harbour | 1987–1989 | 2020 | |
| BR Second Generation (Mark 3) | 455 | | EMU | 75 | 120 | 4 | 9 | Inner suburban routes: London Waterloo – Shepperton, Hampton Court, Woking; London Waterloo via Hounslow or Strawberry Hill; London Waterloo – Dorking, Guildford via Oxshott or Epsom, Chessington South, or Windsor & Eton Riverside | 1982–1985 | 2022–2026 | Scrapped |
| BR Second Generation (Mark 3) | 456 | | EMU | 75 | 120 | 2 | 24 | Inner suburban services in conjunction with services operated by Class 455 units to make 10 coach trains. | 1990–1991 | 2022 | Scrapped |
| Siemens Desiro | 707 Desiro City | | EMU | 100 | 160 | 5 | 30 | Inner suburban services: London Waterloo – Chessington South; London Waterloo – Hampton Court; London Waterloo – Guildford via Epsom | 2015–2018 | 2021–2024 | Transferred to Southeastern |

== Depots ==
The following train depots and stabling sidings were used for the South Western Railway fleet:

- Bournemouth depot is southwest of Bournemouth station, occupying the approach to the former Bournemouth West.
- Farnham Traincare Depot, in Weydon Lane, was opened by the Southern Railway at the time of the electrification of the Portsmouth and Alton lines in 1937.
- Feltham depot was completed in 2021; it is intended to provide stabling for the Class 701 units.
- Fratton Traincare Depot is located on central Portsea Island, alongside Fratton station.
- Northam Traincare Facility was built by Siemens in 2002 as the home depot for the Desiro fleet as part of a 20-year maintenance contract. It is located south of St Denys station and is near Southampton Football Club's St Mary's Stadium.
- Ryde Traincare Depot, alongside Ryde St John's Road on the Isle of Wight serviced the Class 483 units that used to operate on the Island Line.
- Salisbury depot maintains the Class 158 and Class 159 fleet.
- Strawberry Hill train maintenance depot in south west London, was built in 1897, is inside the triangular junction of the Shepperton Branch Line with the Kingston Loop Line, just yards from Strawberry Hill railway station.
- Wimbledon Traincare Depot is located between Wimbledon and Earlsfield stations, on the main line to Waterloo, next to the Wimbledon railway viaduct.

| Preceded by South West Trains | Operator of South Western franchise 2017–2025 | Succeeded by South Western Railway |
