= Ascot–Ash Vale line =

Railway line in southern England

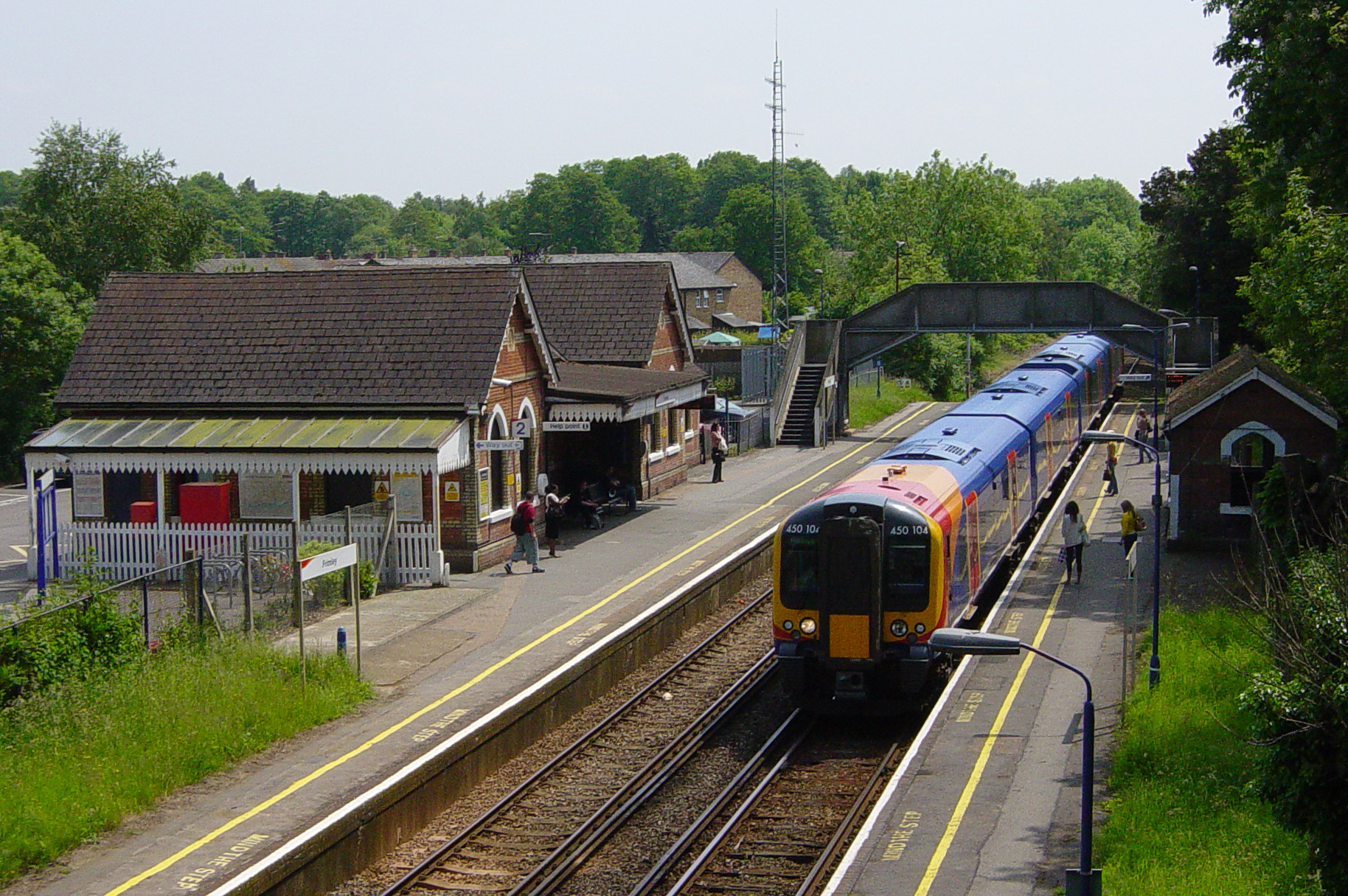
- A Class 450 calls at Frimley station

Overview
- Status: Operational
- Owner: Network Rail
- Locale: South East England
- Termini: Ascot; Ash Vale

Service
- Type: Heavy rail, Commuter Rail
- System: National Rail
- Operator(s): South Western Railway
- Rolling stock: Class 450

Technical
- Number of tracks: 1–2
- Track gauge: 4 ft 8 1/2 in (1,435 mm) standard gauge
- Electrification: 750 V DC 3rd rail
- Operating speed: 60 mph (97 km/h)

The Ascot–Ash Vale line is an 11-mile-58-chain (18.9 km) railway line in Berkshire and Surrey, England. It runs from Ascot station, on the Waterloo–Reading line, to Ash Vale, on the Alton line. There are intermediate stations at Bagshot, Camberley and Frimley, all three of which are in the Borough of Surrey Heath.

All stations are managed by South Western Railway, which operates all services. Most trains on the line run between Aldershot and Ascot; for much of the day, passengers for London must change trains to continue their journeys. Many residents of Surrey Heath prefer to drive to stations outside of the borough for faster, direct rail services to the capital, in preference to using their local line.

Construction of the Ascot–Ash Vale line began in 1864 and was completed by the London and South Western Railway in 1878. The line was electrified using the 750 V DC third-rail system by the Southern Railway in 1939.

== Infrastructure and services ==
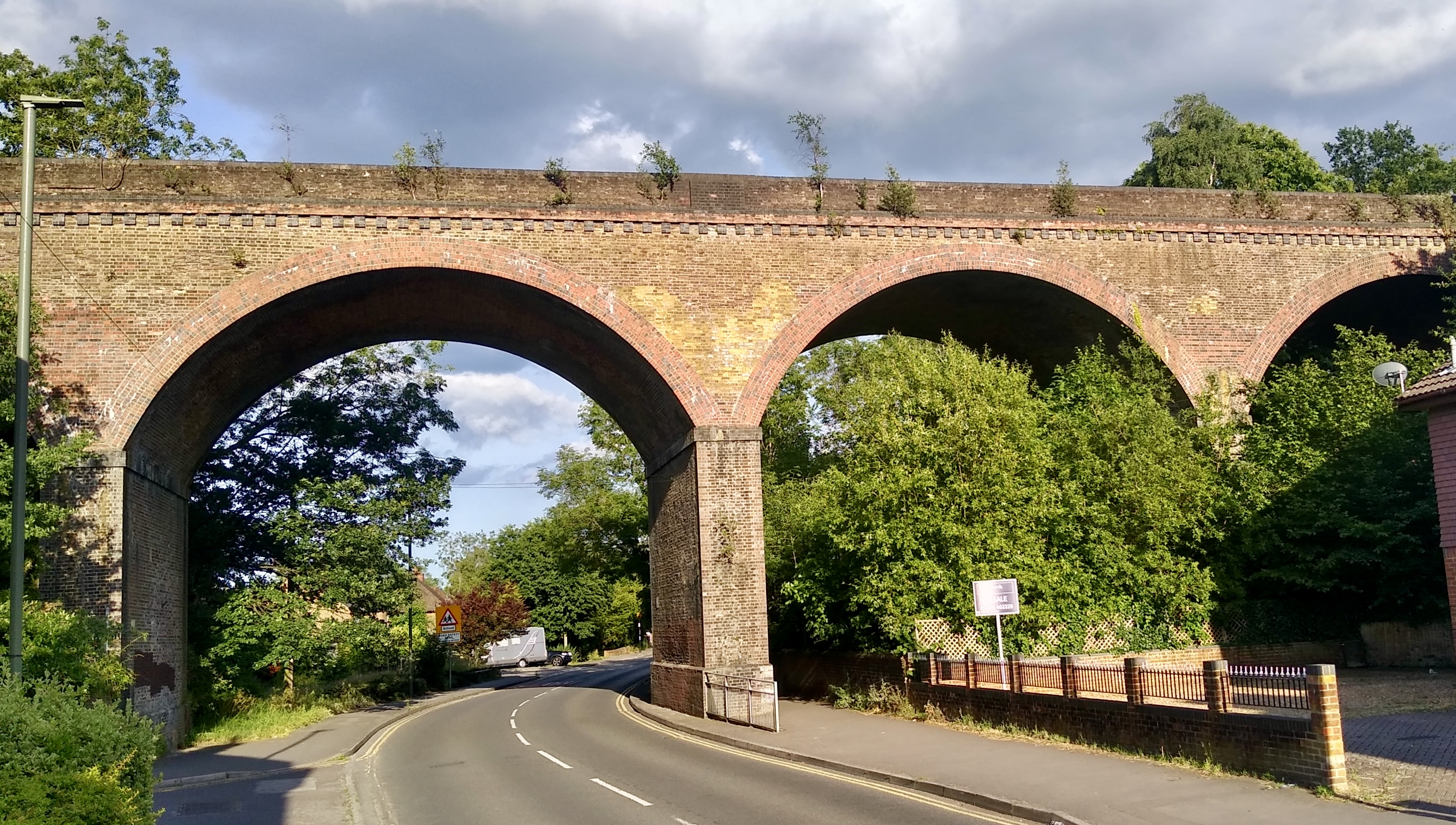
Guildford Road Viaduct, Bagshot

The Ascot–Ash Vale line is a railway line in Berkshire and Surrey, England. It runs for 11 mi 58 ch (18.9 km) from Ascot station, on the Waterloo–Reading line, to Ash Vale Junction, on the Alton line and immediately to the east of Ash Vale station. The northern part of the line is double tracked, but a 1 mi 66 ch (2.9 km) section between Frimley station and Ash Vale Junction is single track. (Note: Double track resumes 16 ch (1,100 ft; 320 m) to the north of Ash Vale junction, allowing trains for Ascot to clear the Alton line before accessing the single-line section towards Frimley.) The line is electrified using the 750 V DC third-rail system and the maximum permitted speed is 60 mph (97 km/h). Signalling is controlled by Basingstoke rail operating centre and Woking area signalling centre. Track Circuit Block is in operation. There is one tunnel, the 121 yd (111 m) Bagshot Tunnel, and there are three level crossings. The line crosses the Basingstoke Canal at Mytchett Lake Railway Bridge and the Windle Brook on the Guildford Road Viaduct.

All stations on the line are managed by South Western Railway, which operates all services. Ascot has three operational platforms, but the other stations all have two each. (Note: The shortest platforms on the line are at Frimley station and have a length of 91 m (299 ft).) The off-peak service pattern is two trains per hour from Aldershot to Ascot, calling at all stations on the line. In the morning peak, two trains continue beyond Ascot to London Waterloo with two similar workings in the opposite direction in the evening peak period. Typical journey times between Ash Vale and Ascot are around 26 minutes. A 2017 infrastructure assessment commissioned by Surrey Heath Borough Council noted that rail journey times to London from Camberley are slow (c. 72 – c. 80 minutes) and that many local residents choose to drive to Brookwood, Farnborough (Main) and Sunningdale for faster, direct trains to the capital.

Stations on the Ascot–Ash Vale line (ordered from north to south)
Station	Distance from London Waterloo via Richmond	Number of platforms	Opening date	Original name	Ref.
Ascot	28 mi 79 ch (46.7 km)	3	4 June 1856	Ascot & Sunninghill	
Bagshot	32 mi 8 ch (51.7 km)	2	18 March 1878		
Camberley	35 mi 30 ch (56.9 km)	2	18 March 1878	Camberley and York Town	
Frimley	37 mi 48 ch (60.5 km)	2	18 March 1878		
Ash Vale	40 mi 65 ch (65.7 km)	2	2 May 1890	North Camp & Ash Vale	(Note: Ash Vale station is 32 mi 38 ch (52.3 km) from London Waterloo when measured via Woking.)

== History ==
=== Proposals and authorisations ===
The Sunningdale and York Town Railway Company was formed in November 1863 to promote a new line from Sunningdale station on the Waterloo–Reading line and the new town of Aldershot. The line was to include a station at York Town for the Royal Military College, which had moved to Sandhurst in 1812, as well as a junction with the South West Main Line at Farnborough. At around the same time, a second similar scheme was proposed by the Sunningdale and Cambridge Town Railway (S&CT), which promoted a more southerly route, serving the new settlement of Camberley and terminating at a junction with the South West Main Line at Farnborough. (Note: Until 15 January 1877, Camberley was known as "Cambridge Town".) Local opinion favoured the second scheme. The Sunningdale and Cambridge Town Railway Act 1864 (27 & 28 Vict. c. ccvii), passed by Parliament on 14 July 1864, authorised the eastern part of the S&CT line from Sunningdale to Camberley and £70,000 was raised to fund its construction. A second act of Parliament, to continue the line to Blackwater station on the Reading–Guildford line, was passed on 29 June the following year as the Sunningdale and Cambridge Town Railway (Extensions) Act 1865 (28 & 29 Vict. c. cxcvii). Construction began with a formal ceremony in November 1864, but after experiencing financial difficulties linked to the bank failure of Overend and Gurney, the company declared bankruptcy in 1866 and the work was abandoned.

In 1872, the London and South Western Railway (LSWR) proposed a new line through the area, which would use much of the track bed prepared for the S&CT railway. The junction with the Waterloo–Reading line was to be at Ascot, rather than Sunningdale, and the connection to the South West Main Line would be at Frimley, from where the line would continue south to the Alton line at Ash Vale station. The new line was authorised by the South Western Railway Act 1873 (36 & 37 Vict. c. lxxi) on 16 June 1873. (Note: The South Western Railway Act 1873 also authorised a connection to the Reading–Guildford line at Farnborough North, but this link was never built.) A contractor was appointed in 1874, but the works progressed slower than expected, meaning that the railway was not ready for its intended opening in 1877.

=== Opening ===
The first part of the line opened between Ascot and the South West Main Line on 18 March 1878, although freight services did not begin until 1 April. The line was single-tracked, but at Frimley Junction, to the south of Frimley station, it split in two with double tracked curves joining the main line. (Note: It is unclear whether the north-to-west curve joining Frimley Junction to the South West Main Line was completed in time for the opening of the line on 18 March 1878. It is possible that this stretch of track opened at a later date.) The initial timetable was six trains per day in both directions between London Waterloo and Ascot via Woking. Goods yards were provided at the three intermediate stations and the opening of the railway at Bagshot stimulated the growth of the plant nurseries in the area.

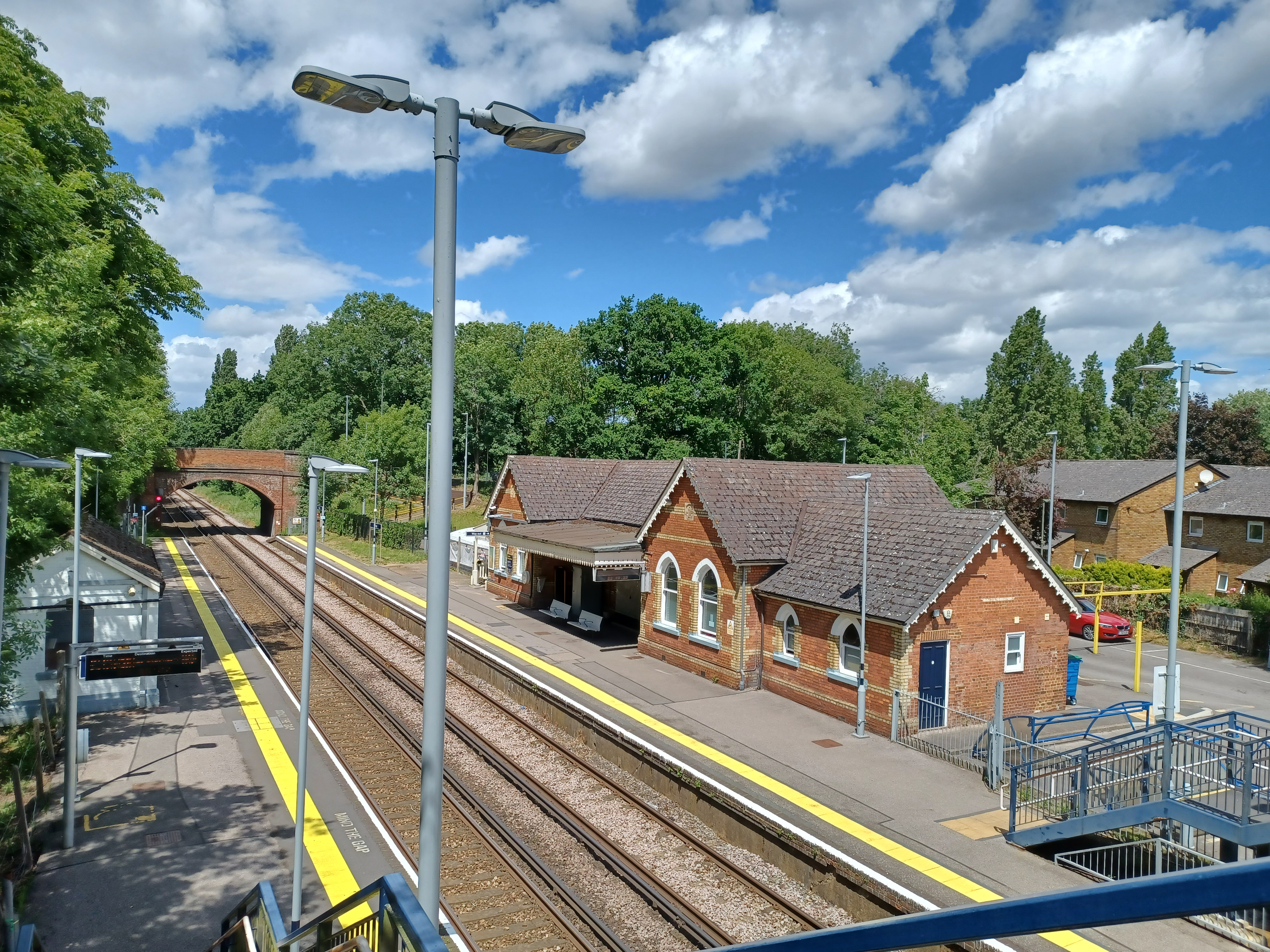
Frimley railway station

On 2 June 1878, the single line to Ash Vale was opened and doubling of the track between Frimley Junction and station was completed. Double track northwards from Frimley to Ascot was commissioned on 11 June 1893. The section south to Ash Vale was never dualled, although the formation had been built to allow a second set of rails to be added.

=== 20th century ===
The opening of the barracks at Deepcut and Blackdown increased traffic on the Ascot–Ash Vale line. Between August 1914 and November 1916, public train services were suspended to allow army traffic to operate. In 1917, German Prisoners of War were transported to Frimley station, before being taken to a camp on Frith Hill. On 30 April 1938, the Surrey Border and Camberley Railway opened its southern terminus at Farnborough Green, close to Frimley station. The 10 1/4 in (260 mm) narrow gauge railway closed at the start of the Second World War and did not reopen after the end of hostilities.

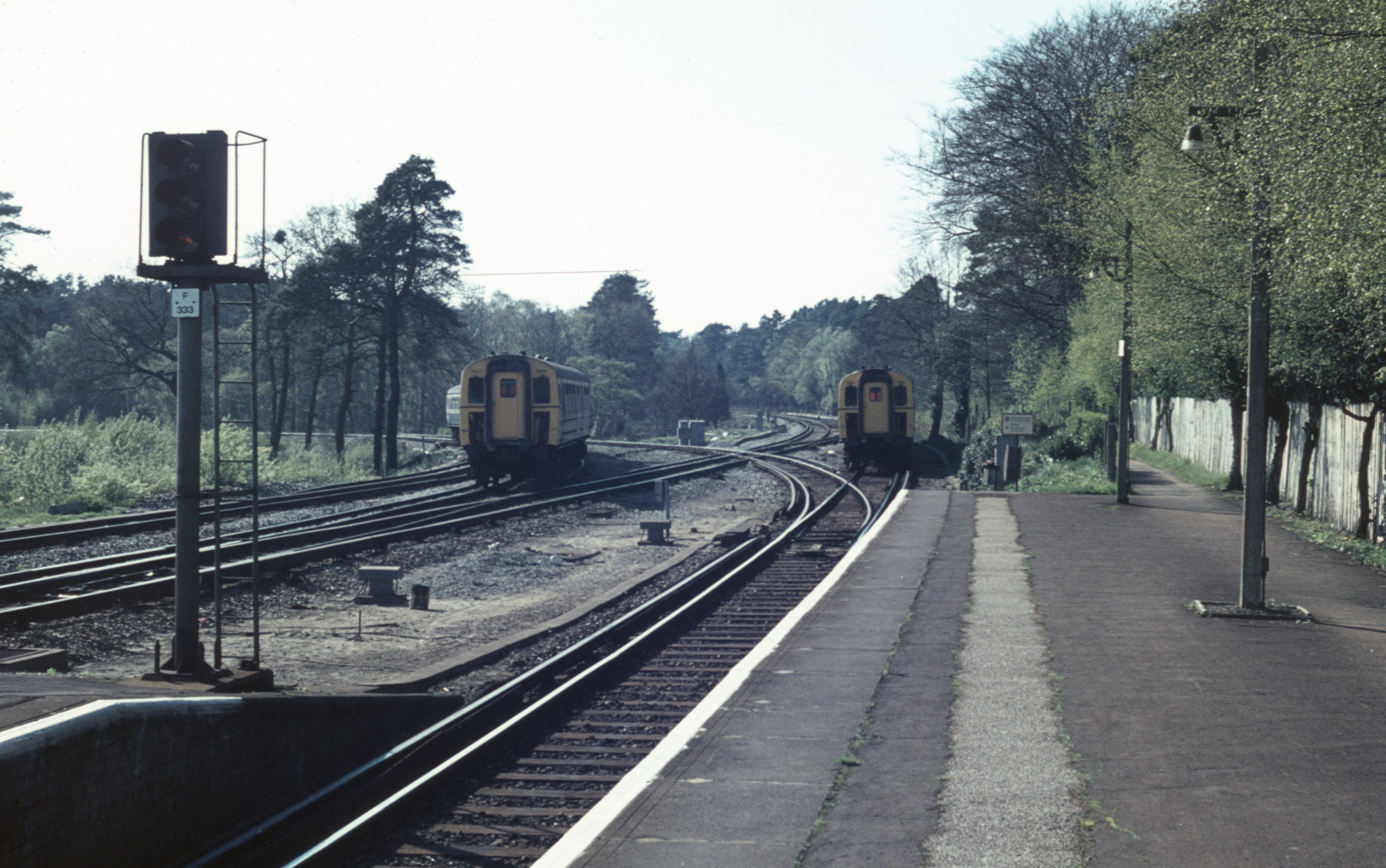
A Class 423 unit (left) departs Ascot for Ash Vale in April 1981, while a Class 421 heads for Reading

Electrification of the Ascot–Ash Vale line was completed shortly before the start of the Second World War by the Southern Railway. Electric services began on 1 January 1939. Under the new timetable, most trains were able to run from Ash Vale via Staines to London Waterloo, instead of terminating at Ascot. Prior to electrification, many steam-hauled services were operated with M7 0-4-4T locomotives. Class 401 units were used on the line from 1939 to 1971 and Class 421 units were introduced in 1972.

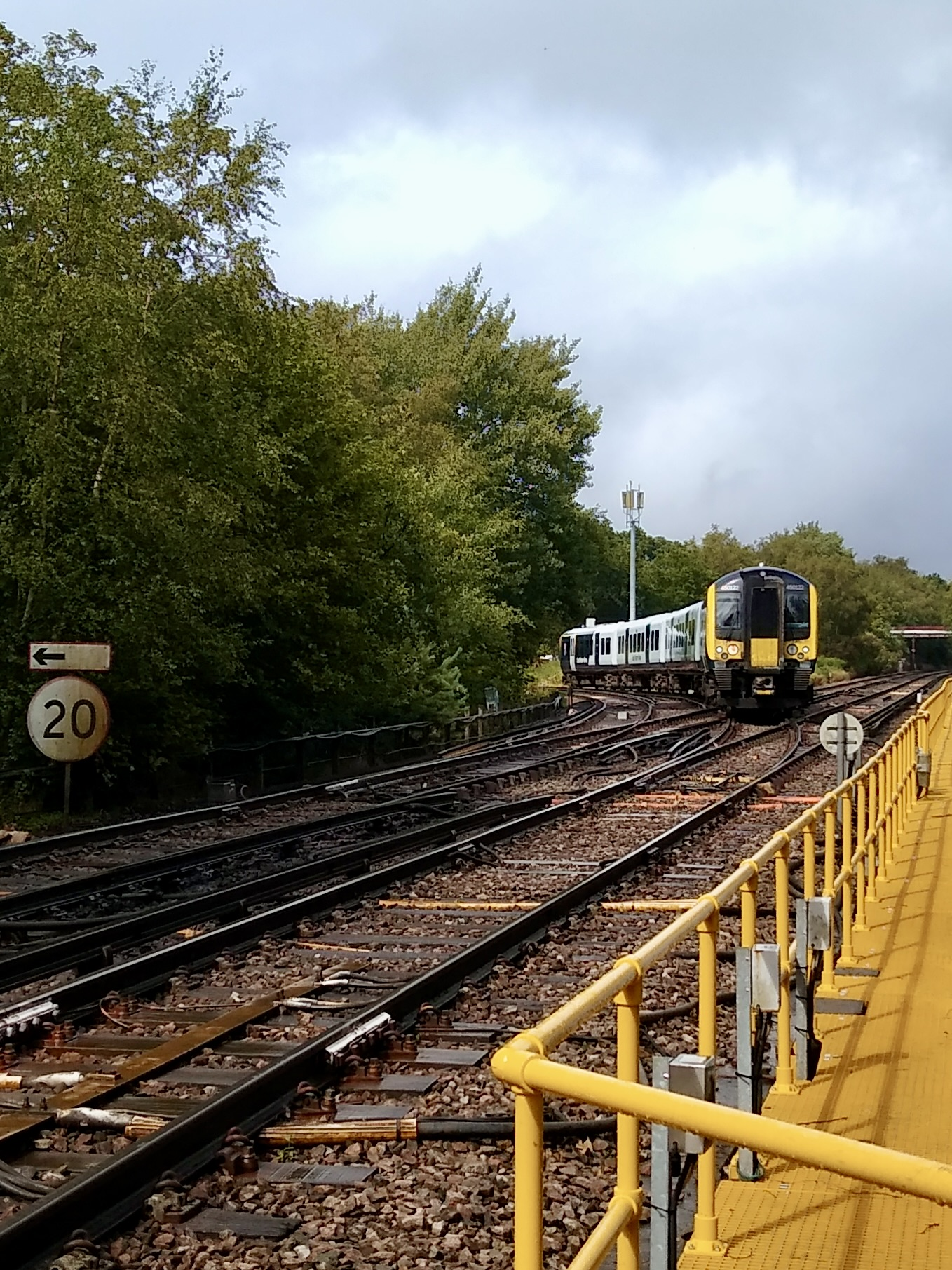
A Class 450 unit from Frimley joins the Alton line at Ash Vale Junction

The 1960s saw a period of rationalisation. The curves at Frimley, linking the line to the South West Main Line, were closed on 25 October 1964. The goods yards at Bagshot, Camberley and Frimley closed between 1962 and 1965. Two major resignalling projects took place in the early 1970s. The first, in which colour light signals were installed between Frimley and Ash Vale, was completed on 25 March 1973. Frimley Junction signal box closed on that day, but the box at Ash Vale remained in use until 2014. The resignalling of the stretch of line between Camberley and Ascot was commissioned on 8 September 1974, with control of all train movements being transferred to Feltham. Bagshot signal box had closed on 3 July 1973, but Camberley box was retained to operate the level crossing until it too was closed in January 1975. A new station building was constructed at Camberley in 1976–77, providing office accommodation above the main entrance from the town.

== Bibliography ==
- Bennett, Mary Ann (2009). Camberley : A History. Chichester: Phillimore. ISBN 978-1-86-077557-4.
- Hornby, Frank (1995). London Suburban. Peterborough: Silver Link Publishing. ISBN 978-1-85-794039-8.
- Jackson, Alan A. (1999). The railway in Surrey. Penryn: Atlantic Transport Publishers. ISBN 978-0-90-689990-8.
- Jebens, Dieter (1996). Guide to the Basingstoke Canal. Mytchett: Basingstoke Canal Authority.
- Mitchell, Vic; Smith, Keith (1989). Branch lines around Ascot. Midhurst: Middleton Press. ISBN 978-0-90-652064-2.
- Vine, P.A.L (1994). London's lost route to Basingstoke (2nd ed.). Stroud: Sutton Publishing. ISBN 978-0-75-090359-2.
- Williams, R. A. (1973). The London & South Western Railway. Vol. 2: Growth and Consolidation. Newton Abbot: David & Charles. ISBN 0-7153-5940-1.
- "Kent / Sussex / Wessex Routes Sectional Appendix" (PDF). Network Rail. 2009.
- "Delivering a better railway for a better Britain | Route Specifications: Wessex" (PDF). Network Rail. 2016.
- Quick, Michael (2023) [2001]. Railway Passenger Stations in Great Britain (PDF) (5.05 ed.). London: Railway and Canal Historical Society.
