= South Western Trains =

South Western Trains may refer to:

- South West Trains (1996–2017), registered as Stagecoach South Western Trains Limited, former train operator in England from privatisation in 1996 until 2017.
- South Western Railway (2017–2025), registered as First MTR South Western Trains Limited, former train operator in England from 2017 until 2025.
- South Western Railway, the government owned train operator in England since 2025.
