= Sunningdale Barrow =

Barrows in England

Coordinates: 51.3887°N 0.6332°W

Sunningdale Barrow is the site of three Bronze Age round barrows, including one bowl barrow near Sunningdale railway station, Sunningdale (grid reference SU952664), now in Berkshire but formerly in Surrey. Excavations on one barrow located cremations, mainly inurned.
