= Frimley railway station =

Railway station in Surrey, England

Frimley
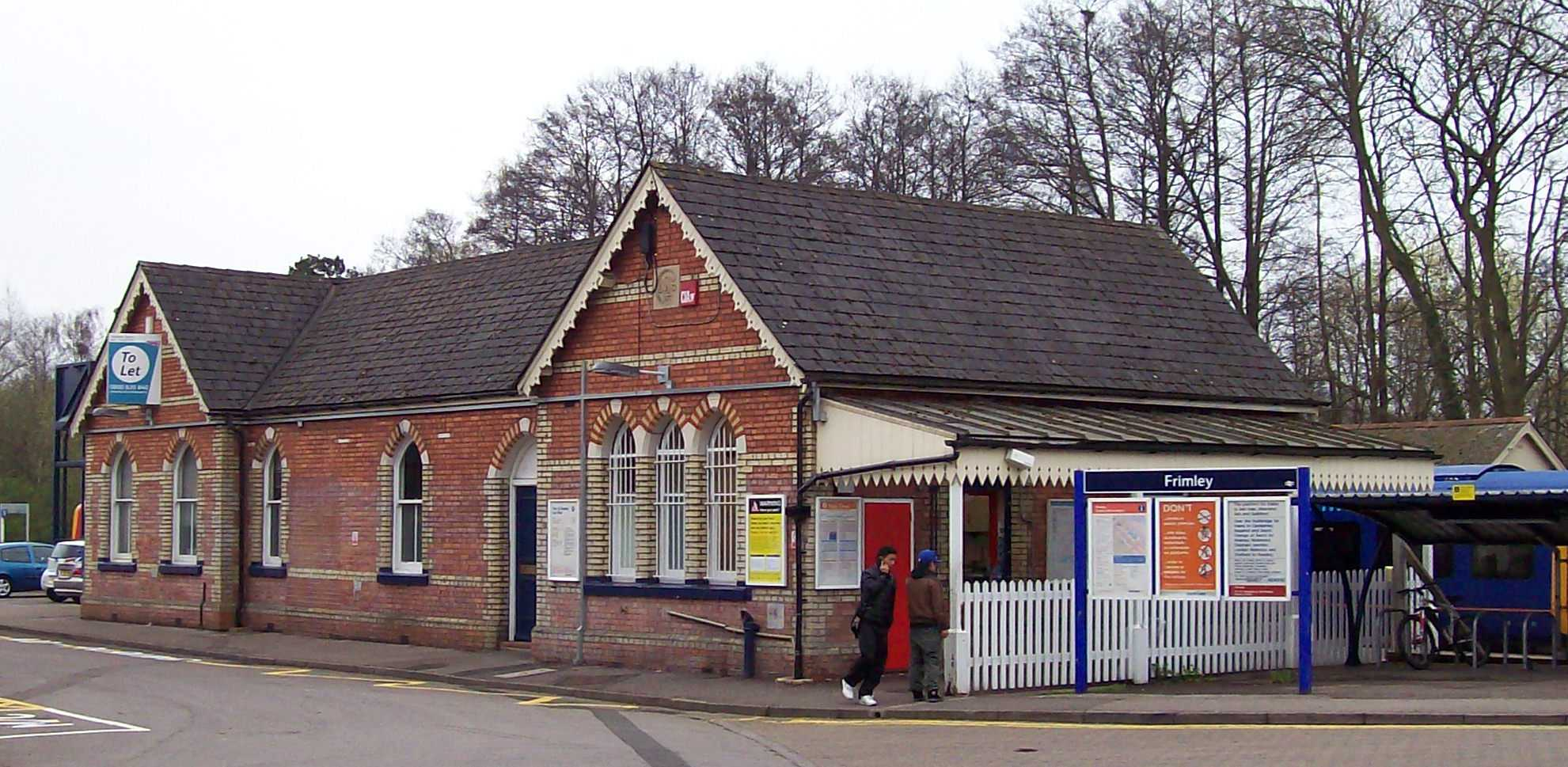
- Frimley Railway station in April 2012

General information
- Location: Frimley, Surrey Heath; England
- Coordinates: 51.311789°N 0.7471°W
- Grid reference: SU874577
- Managed by: South Western Railway
- Platforms: 2

Other information
- Station code: FML
- Classification: DfT category E

History
- Opened: 18 March 1878

Passengers
- 2020/21: ▼63,066
- 2021/22: ▲0.141 million
- 2022/23: ▲0.164 million
- 2023/24: ▲0.183 million
- 2024/25: ▲0.205 million
Location
Notes
- Passenger statistics from the Office of Rail and Road

Frimley railway station is in the town of Frimley in Surrey, England. The station, and all trains serving it, are operated by South Western Railway. It is situated on the Ascot to Guildford line, 37 miles 48 chains (60.5 km) from London Waterloo.

== History ==
The line through Frimley is a link between the Waterloo to Reading line at Ascot and the Waterloo-Alton line at Ash Vale, although the line south from here initially joined the Woking to Basingstoke main line at Sturt Lane Junction. The station building was built in 1877 by the London and South Western Railway to serve this line, with the link to Ash Vale being opened the following year. The line was later electrified in January 1939. The line becomes single south of the station and remains so as far as the junction with the line from Brookwood just short of Ash Vale station.

== Services ==
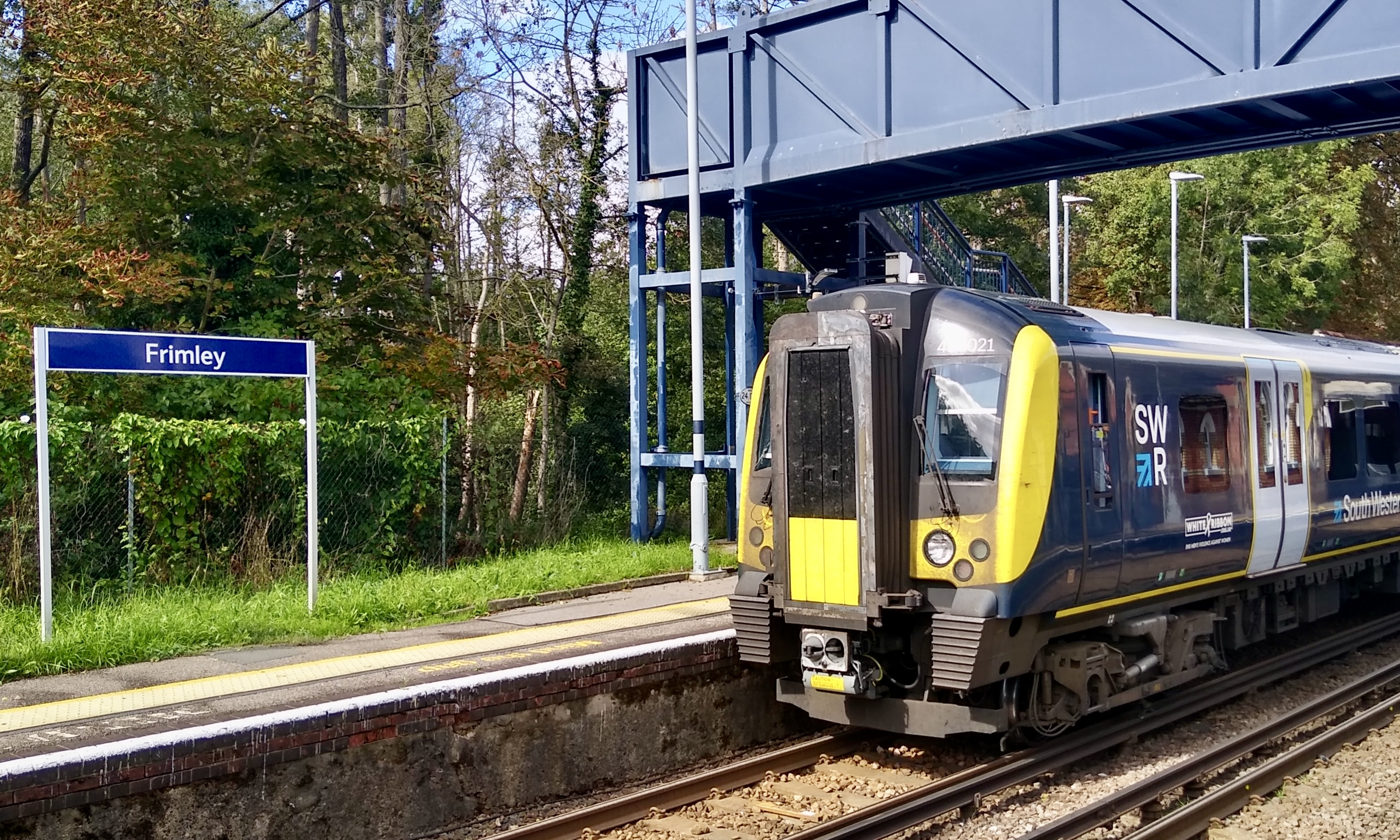
A South Western Railway service bound for Ascot

All services at Frimley are operated by South Western Railway using Class 450 EMUs.

The typical off-peak service is two trains per hour in each direction between Ascot and Aldershot. During the peak hours, the station is served by two morning services that continue beyond Ascot to London Waterloo via Staines as well two evening services from London Waterloo.

On Sundays, the service is reduced to hourly in each direction and eastbound services are extended beyond Aldershot to Guildford.

Preceding station	National Rail	Following station
Camberley	South Western Railway Ascot to Guildford Line	Ash Vale
