= Ash Vale railway station =

Railway station in Surrey, England

Coordinates: 51°16′19″N 0°43′19″W

Ash Vale
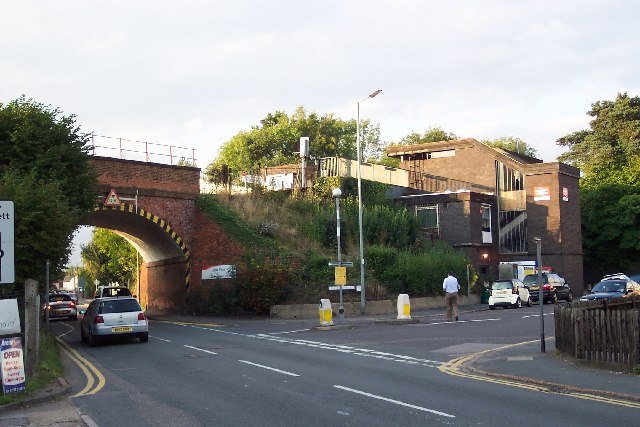
- The station in September 2005

General information
- Location: Ash Vale, Guildford; England
- Grid reference: SU892533
- Managed by: South Western Railway
- Platforms: 2

Other information
- Station code: AHV
- Classification: DfT category D

History
- Opened: 2 May 1870

Passengers
- 2020/21: ▼88,390
- Interchange: ▼15,343
- 2021/22: ▲0.227 million
- Interchange: ▲44,113
- 2022/23: ▲0.303 million
- Interchange: ▲68,635
- 2023/24: ▲0.328 million
- Interchange: ▲91,576
- 2024/25: ▲0.358 million
- Interchange: ▲0.100 million
Location
Notes
- Passenger statistics from the Office of Rail and Road

Ash Vale railway station serves the village of Ash Vale, in Surrey, England. It is at the junction of the London to Alton line and the Ascot–Ash Vale line, 32 miles 38 chains (52.3 km) down the line from London Waterloo. The station and all trains serving it are operated by South Western Railway.

== Location ==
Ash Vale station is on an embankment and is adjacent to the Basingstoke Canal. It is around half a mile from North Camp station on the North Downs Line.

== History ==
The station was opened by the London and South Western Railway on 2 May 1870, under the name of "North Camp and Ash Vale" and was given its present name on 30 March 1924. It became part of the Southern Railway as a result of the Grouping of 1923.

Electrification of the line between Woking and Farnham was completed in January 1937 and of the branch to Ascot two years later. Responsibility for the station passed to the Southern Region of British Railways on nationalisation in 1948. The original main station building on the south side had to be demolished due to subsidence; the current replacement dates from 1972.

When sectorisation was introduced in the 1980s, the station was served by Network SouthEast until the privatisation of British Rail.

Train movements in the Ash Vale station area and the junction beyond were controlled by Ash Vale Junction signal box, constructed in June 1879. The signal box, complete with its four residents and cover staff, operated 24 hours a day, 364 days a year; it closed in 2014 and was demolished two years later.

== Accidents and incidents ==
In 1952, the booking clerk at Ash Vale was murdered following a hold-up by a fellow rail worker.

On the evening of 29 August 1990, a Class 421 electric multiple unit working a Guildford to Ascot service derailed at Ash Vale Junction. All four carriages remained upright; 20 passengers were evacuated by military personnel and escorted to Ash Vale station.

== Services ==
The route is operated by South Western Railway, with the following services:

- On Mondays to Saturdays, there are trains approximately every 30 minutes between London Waterloo and Alton, and between Ascot and Aldershot.
- On Sundays, trains run every 30 minutes between London Waterloo and Alton, and every 60 minutes between Ascot and Guildford.

Preceding station	National Rail	Following station
Brookwood or Woking	South Western Railway; Alton Line	Aldershot
Frimley	South Western Railway; Ascot–Ash Vale line	Aldershot

== Gallery ==
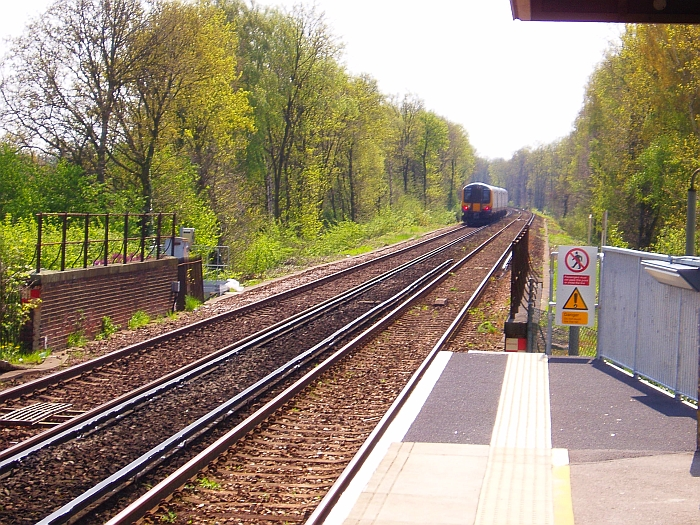
A train heads south from Ash Vale station towards Aldershot in April 2006.

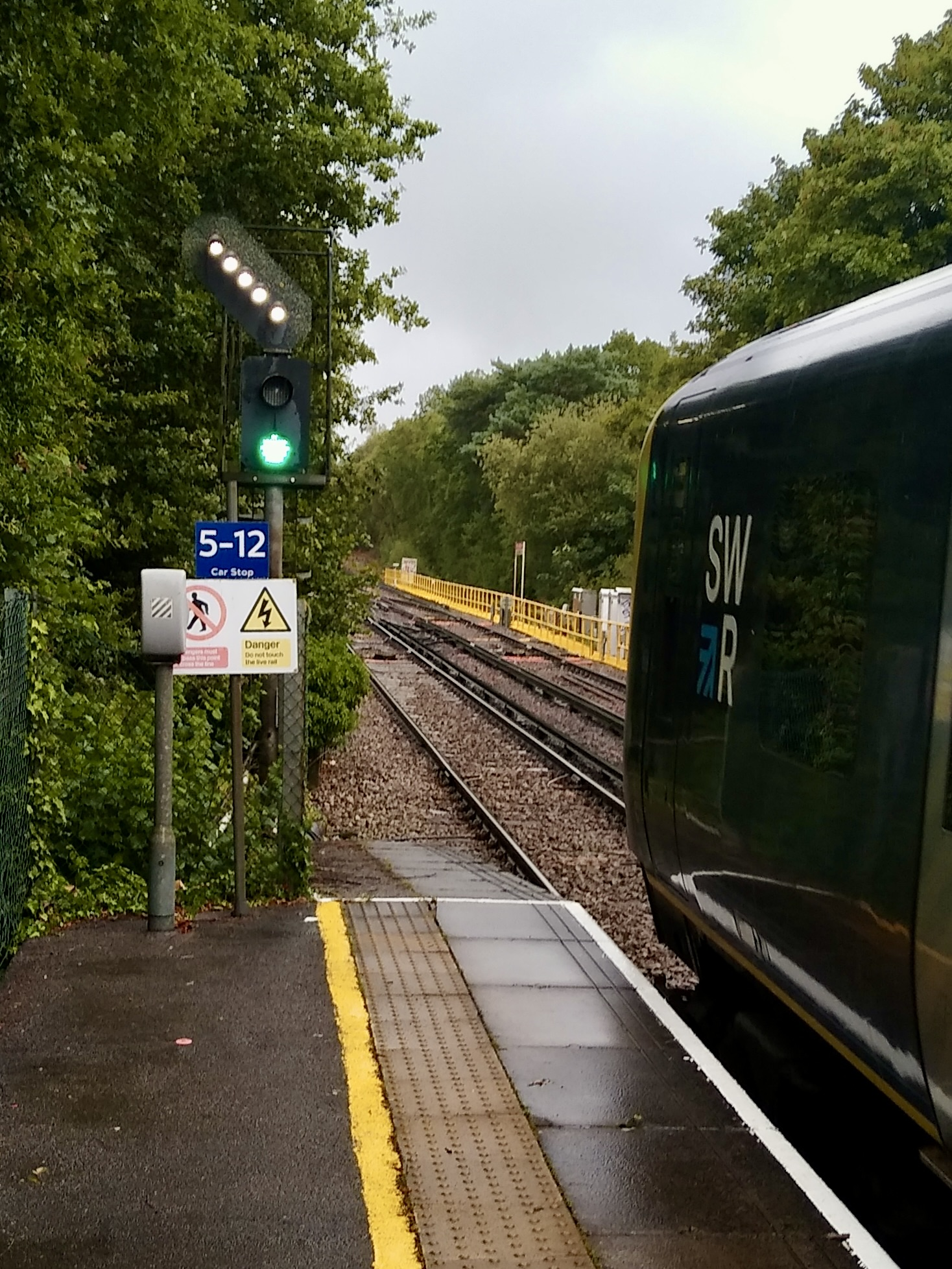
A departing train is signalled onto the line to Ascot in August 2023.

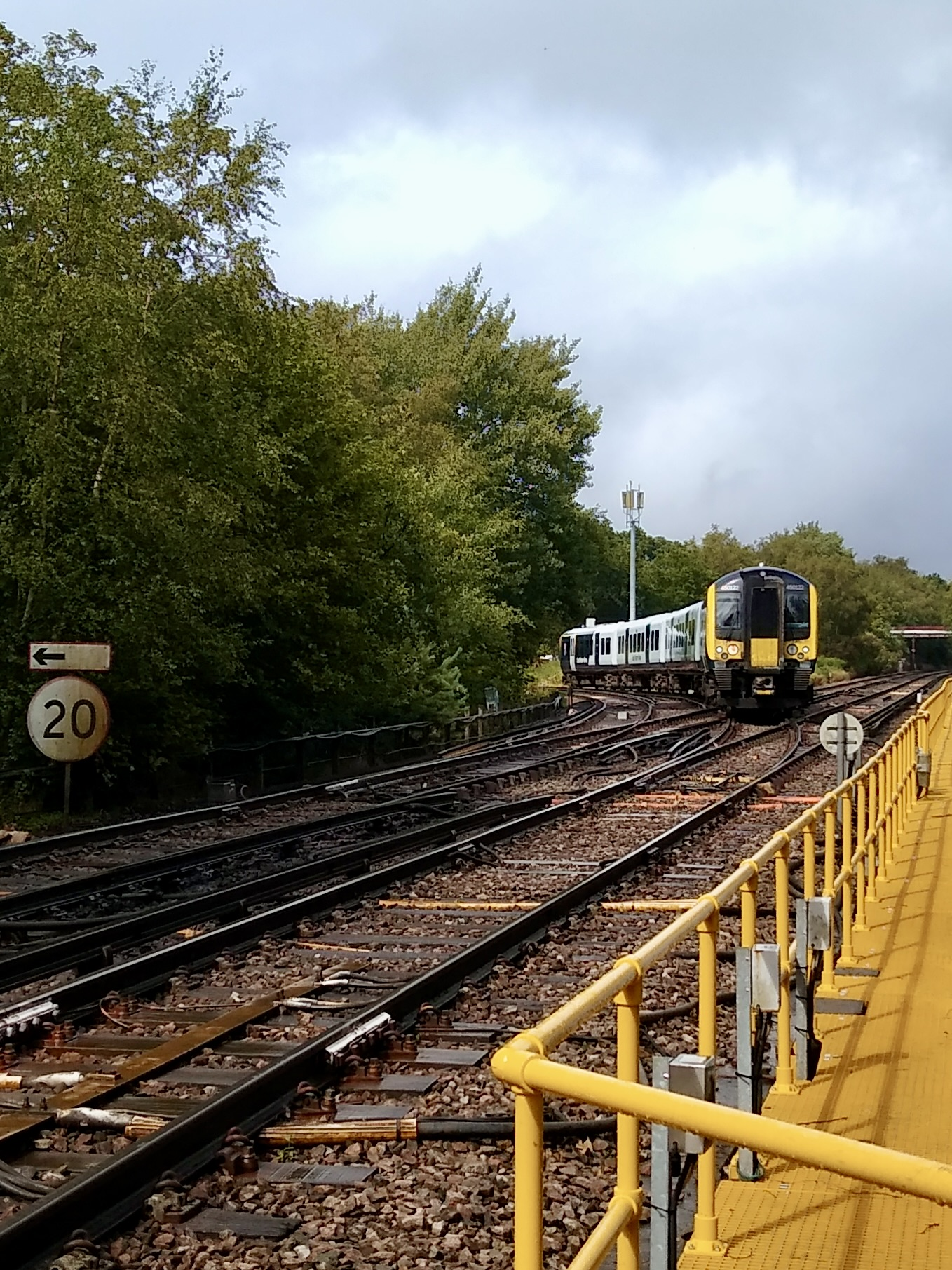
A train from Ascot joins the line from Woking at Ash Vale Junction in August 2023.

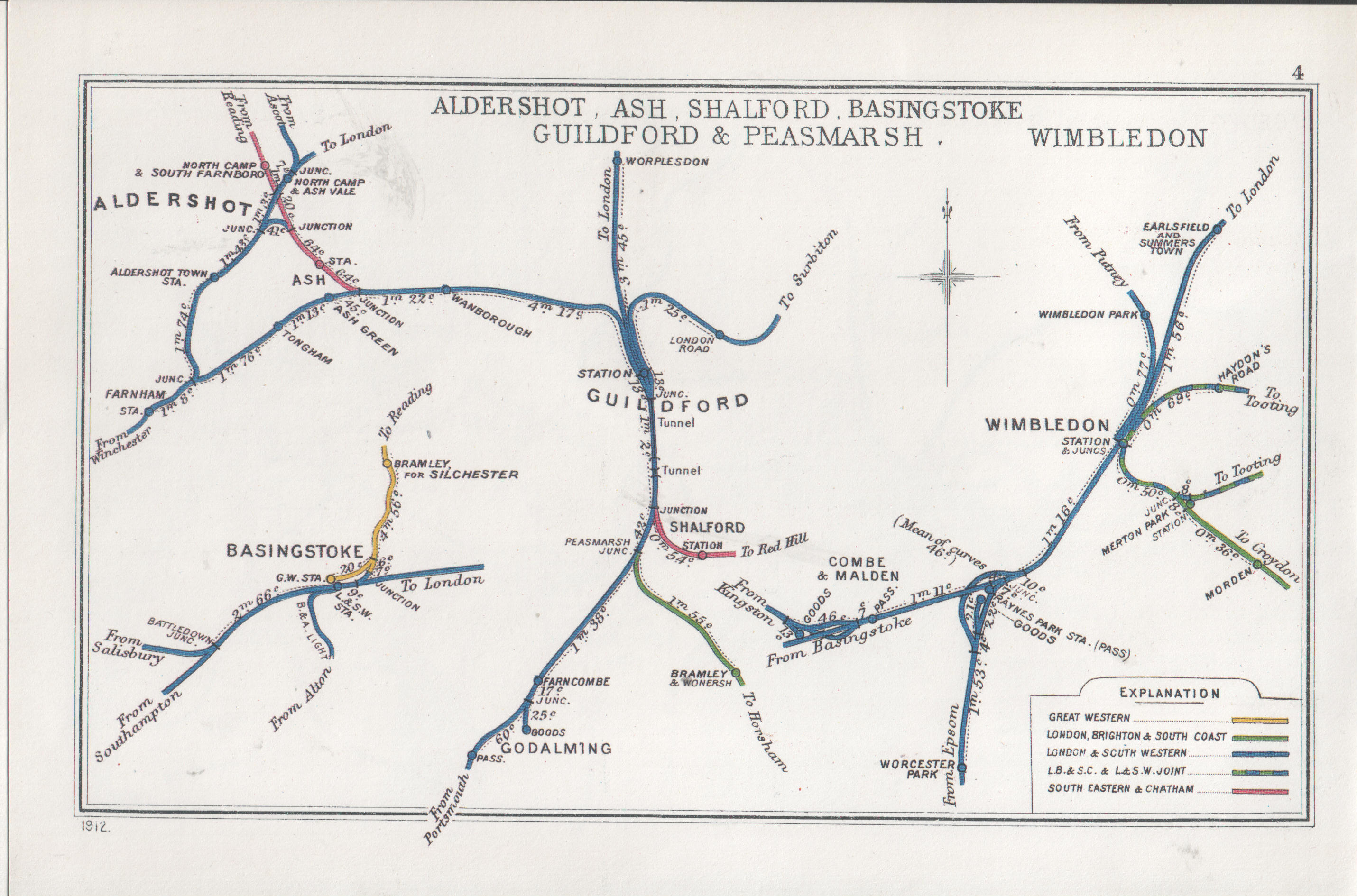
A 1912 Railway Clearing House map of lines around Farnham railway station

== Bibliography ==
- Butt, R. V. J. (October 1995). The Directory of Railway Stations: details every public and private passenger station, halt, platform and stopping place, past and present (1st ed.). Sparkford: Patrick Stephens Ltd. ISBN 978-1-85260-508-7. OCLC 60251199. OL 11956311M.
- Jowett, Alan (2000). Jowett's Nationalised Railway Atlas (1st ed.). Penryn, Cornwall: Atlantic Transport Publishers. ISBN 978-0-906899-99-1. OCLC 228266687.
