= Bagshot railway station =

Railway station in Surrey, England

Coordinates: 51°21′50″N 0°41′20″W

Bagshot
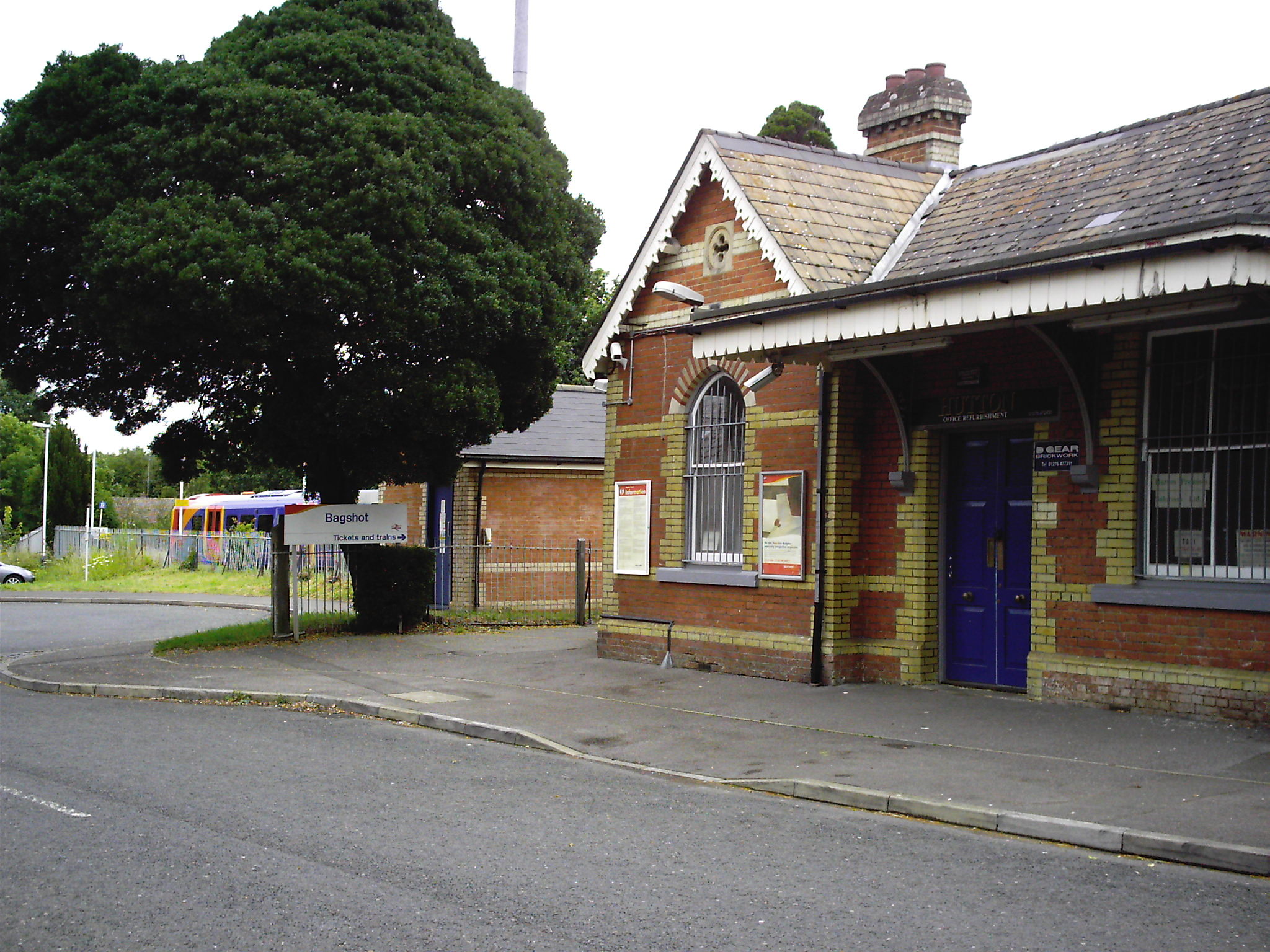

General information
- Location: Bagshot, Surrey Heath; England
- Grid reference: SU914636
- Managed by: South Western Railway
- Platforms: 2

Other information
- Station code: BAG
- Classification: DfT category E

History
- Opened: 18 March 1878

Passengers
- 2020/21: ▼31,562
- 2021/22: ▲85,444
- 2022/23: ▲0.104 million
- 2023/24: ▲0.114 million
- 2024/25: ▲0.121 million
Location
Notes
- Passenger statistics from the Office of Rail and Road

Bagshot railway station serves the village of Bagshot, in the west of Surrey, England. The station and all trains calling there are operated by South Western Railway. It on the Ascot–Ash Vale line, 32 miles 8 chains (51.7 km) from London Waterloo.

== History ==
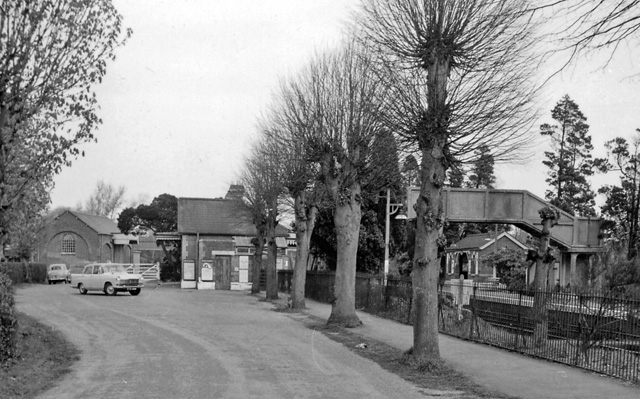
Bagshot station in April 1962

The station was opened by the London and South Western Railway, it became part of the Southern Railway during the Grouping of 1923. The station then passed on to the Southern Region of British Railways on nationalisation in 1948.

When sectorisation was introduced in the 1980s, the station was served by Network SouthEast until the privatisation of British Rail in 1997.

== Services ==
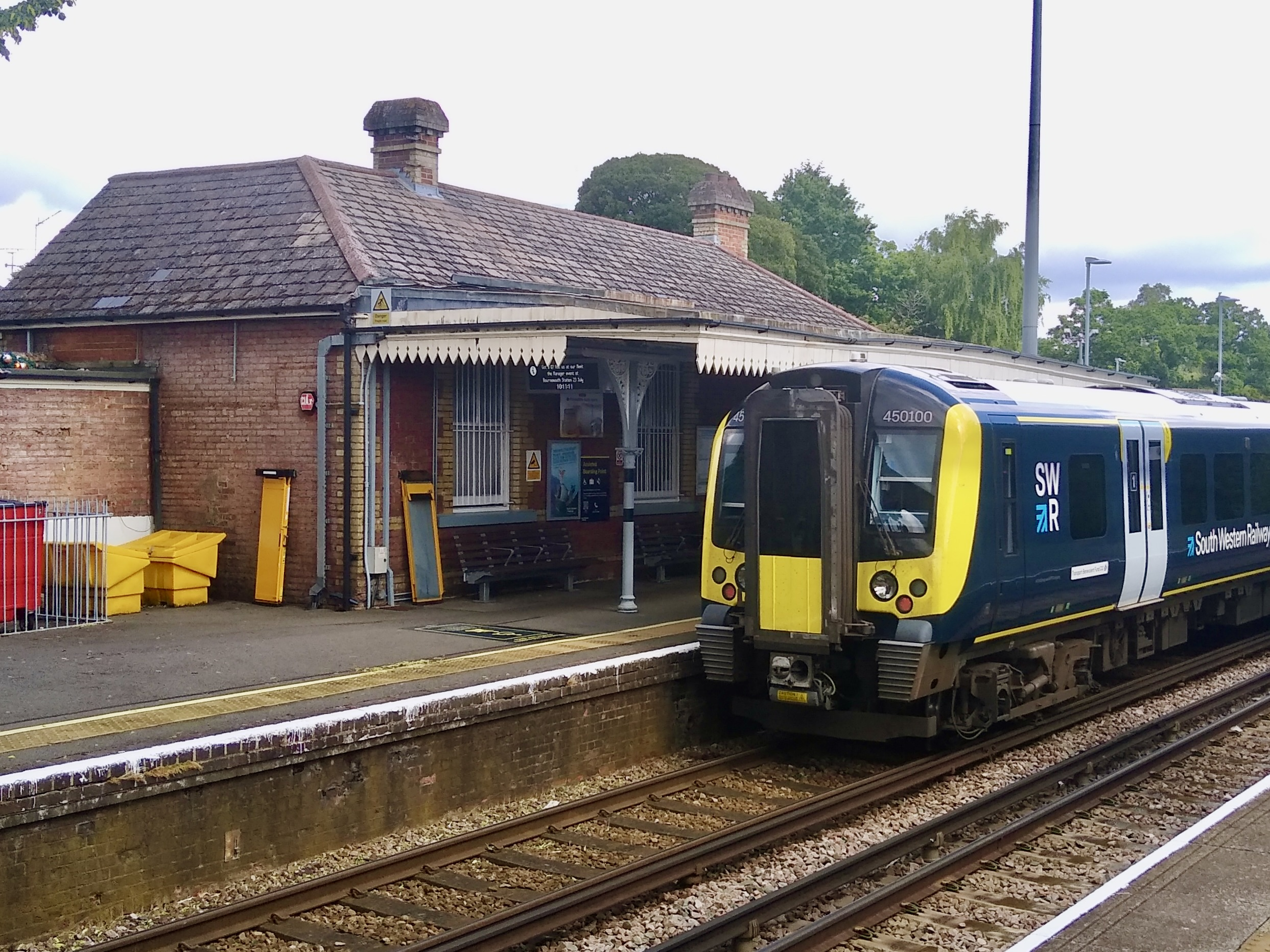
An Ascot-bound service at Bagshot

The typical off-peak service is two trains per hour in each direction between Ascot and Aldershot. During peak hours, the station is served by two morning services that continue beyond Ascot to London Waterloo, via Staines, with two returning evening services. On Sundays, the service is reduced to hourly in each direction and eastbound services are extended beyond Aldershot to Guildford.

Preceding station	National Rail	Following station
Ascot	South Western Railway Ascot–Ash Vale line	Camberley

== Sources ==
- Butt, R. V. J. (October 1995). The Directory of Railway Stations: details every public and private passenger station, halt, platform and stopping place, past and present (1st ed.). Sparkford: Patrick Stephens Ltd. ISBN 978-1-85260-508-7. OCLC 60251199. OL 11956311M.
- Jowett, Alan (2000). Jowett's Nationalised Railway Atlas (1st ed.). Penryn, Cornwall: Atlantic Transport Publishers. ISBN 978-0-906899-99-1. OCLC 228266687.
- Jowett, Alan (March 1989). Jowett's Railway Atlas of Great Britain and Ireland: From Pre-Grouping to the Present Day (1st ed.). Sparkford: Patrick Stephens Ltd. ISBN 978-1-85260-086-0. OCLC 22311137.
