= Earlsfield railway station =

National Rail station in London, England

Earlsfield
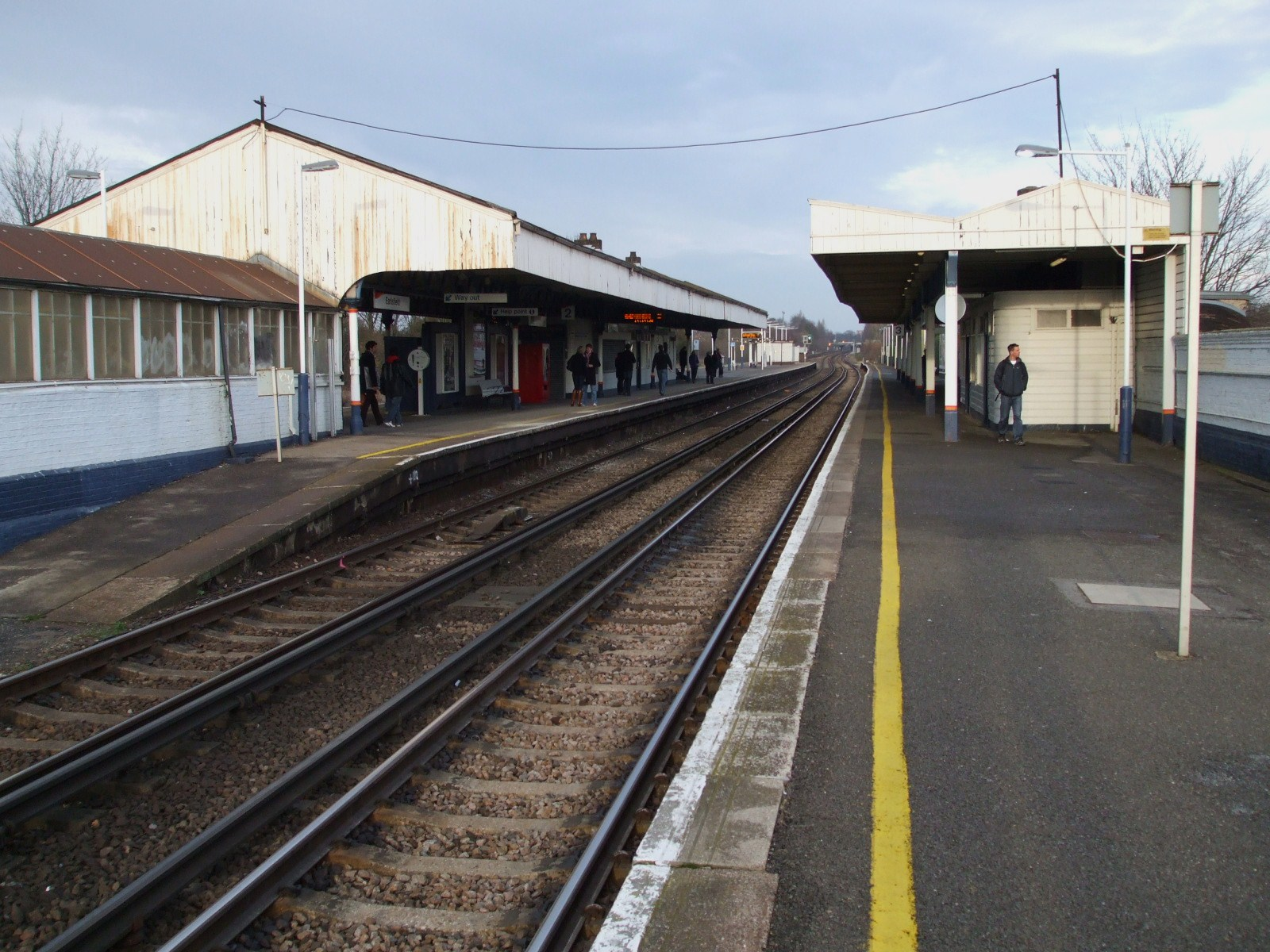
- Interactive map of Earlsfield

General information
- Location: Earlsfield
- Local authority: London Borough of Wandsworth
- Managed by: South Western Railway
- Station code: EAD
- DfT category: D
- Number of platforms: 3
- Tracks: 4
- Accessible: Yes
- Fare zone: 3

National Rail annual entry and exit
- 2020–21: ▼1.784 million
- 2021–22: ▲4.184 million
- 2022–23: ▲4.734 million
- 2023–24: ▲5.138 million
- 2024–25: ▲5.569 million

Key dates
- 1 April 1884: Opened

Other information
- External links: Departures; Facilities
- Coordinates: 51.4424°N 0.1877°W

Earlsfield railway station is on the South West Main Line serving Earlsfield in the London Borough of Wandsworth, South London. The station is in London fare zone 3, 5 miles 46 chains (9.0 km) from London Waterloo and situated between Clapham Junction and Wimbledon. It is operated by South Western Railway, as are all the trains serving it.

== History ==
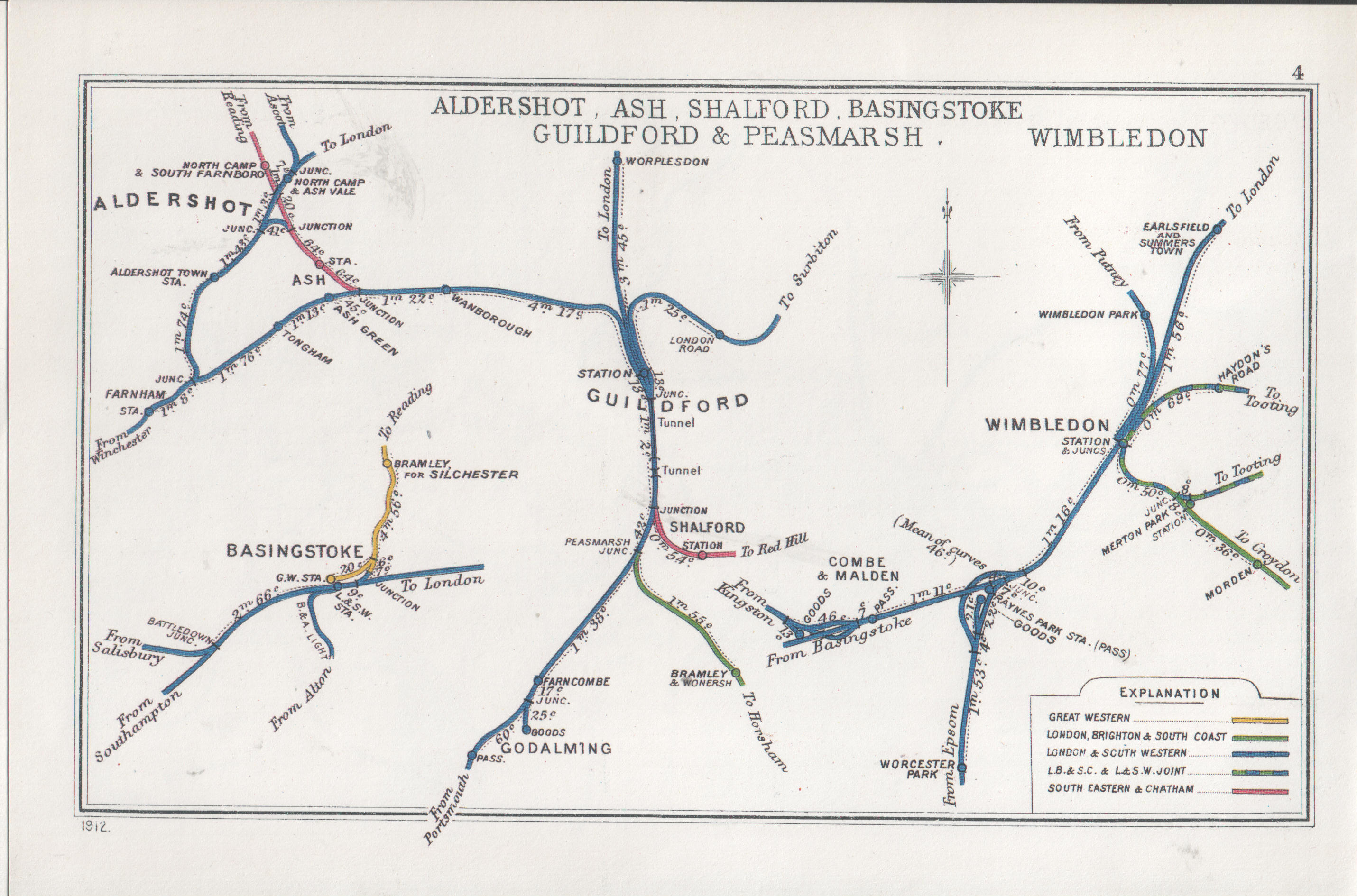
A 1912 Railway Clearing House map of lines around Earlsfield railway station

The station was named after a large nearby Victorian residence, Earlsfield, now demolished. This was owned by the Davis family, who also owned the land required for the station, and one of the conditions of sale was that the station would be named after their house.

Opened by the London and South Western Railway on 1 April 1884, it became part of the Southern Railway during the grouping of 1923. The station then passed to the Southern Region of British Railways on nationalisation in 1948.

When sectorisation was introduced in the 1980s, the station was served by Network SouthEast until the privatisation of British Rail.

In 2012 Network Rail undertook a major revamp of the station. The main entrance was reconstructed and lifts were installed for each platform as part of a £5.6 million scheme to improve facilities and accessibility, including the provision of step-free access.

In 2014, sliding gates were installed in the security fencing separating platforms 1 and 2 at the station as a safety measure.

== Services ==
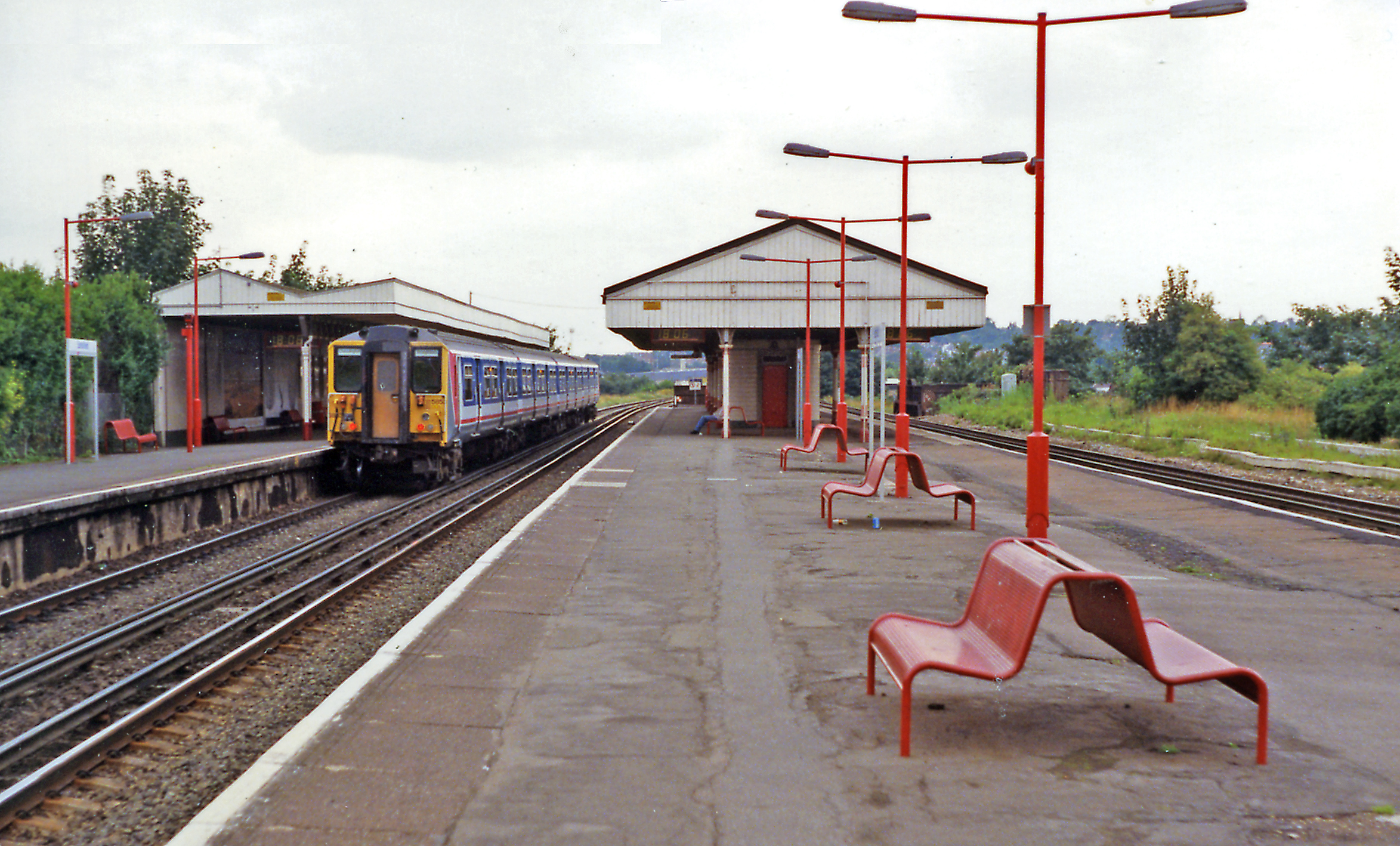
Platform view (1991)

All services at Earlsfield are operated by South Western Railway.

The typical off-peak service in trains per hour is:

- 12 tph to London Waterloo
- 2 tph to Chessington South
- 2 tph to Teddington via Kingston, returning to London Waterloo via Richmond
- 2 tph to Hampton Court
- 1 tph to Dorking via Epsom
- 3 tph to Guildford (1 of these runs via Epsom and 2 run via Cobham)
- 2 tph to Woking via Weybridge

Additional services call at the station during the peak hours.

Preceding station	National Rail	Following station
Clapham Junction	South Western Railway South West Main Line	Wimbledon

== Connections ==
London Buses Routes 44, 77, 270 and Night Route N44 serve the station.
