= Ascot railway station (Berkshire) =

Railway station in Berkshire, England

Coordinates: 51.406°N 0.676°W

Ascot
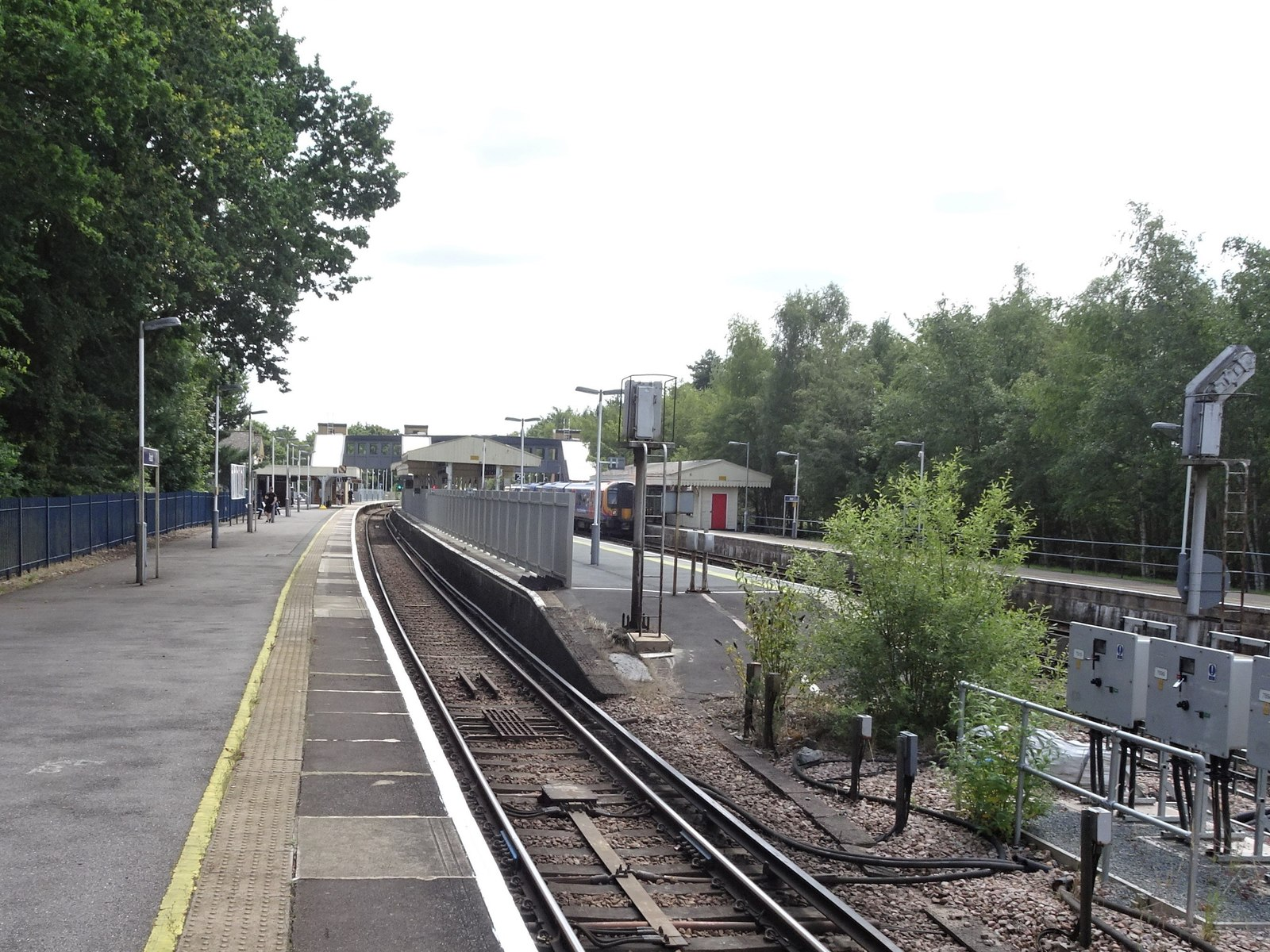

General information
- Location: Ascot, Windsor and Maidenhead; England
- Grid reference: SU921682
- Managed by: South Western Railway
- Platforms: 3+1 disused

Other information
- Station code: ACT
- Classification: DfT category C2

Key dates
- 4 June 1856: Opened
- 1 February 1857: Renamed Ascot & Sunninghill
- 10 July 1921: Renamed Ascot

Passengers
- 2020/21: ▼0.155 million
- Interchange: ▼71,831
- 2021/22: ▲0.551 million
- Interchange: ▲0.176 million
- 2022/23: ▲0.821 million
- Interchange: ▲0.225 million
- 2023/24: ▲0.857 million
- Interchange: ▲0.260 million
- 2024/25: ▲0.947 million
- Interchange: ▲0.292 million
Location
Notes
- Passenger statistics from the Office of Rail and Road

Ascot railway station serves the town of Ascot, in Berkshire, England. It is 28 miles 79 chains (46.7 km) down the line from London Waterloo. The station and all trains serving it are operated by South Western Railway. It is at the junction of the Waterloo to Reading line with the Ascot to Guildford line.

== History ==
The Staines, Wokingham and Woking Railway opened the station when it reached Ascot on 4 June 1856. On 9 July, the line was extended to Wokingham. On 18 March 1878 Ascot became a junction when the line towards Ash Vale was opened. Later the London and South Western Railway took over the SWWJR. In the Grouping of 1923, the L&SWR became part of the Southern Railway, which electrified both lines using a third rail system on 1 January 1939. Under nationalisation in 1948, Ascot station became part of the Southern Region of British Railways.

The L&SWR opened Ascot Race Course Platform or Ascot West in 1922 to serve Ascot Racecourse. British Rail closed it in 1965.

Ascot had four signal boxes until the 1960s: 'A' and 'B' boxes controlled the main station, West box controlled the racecourse station and "Drake & Mount's Siding" the carriage sidings east of the station. The line through the station is now under the control of the panel box at Feltham.

When British Rail sectorised itself in the 1980s, the station was made part of Network SouthEast.

In 1982, a fire severely damaged the station buildings on the up (London-bound) side.

== Layout ==
The station has three active platforms and one disused platform:

- The London-bound track is a single tracked with platform faces on either side, both of which are called platform 1. Until some time prior to 2008, both faces could be used to board London-bound trains, but now only the doors on the ticket office side of the train open with the other side now being fenced off.
- Platform 2 serves the Reading-bound line
- Platform 3 serves the Guildford line for trains starting and terminating their journeys at Ascot
- There is a disused and overgrown bay platform next to platform 1 that was used for terminating trains from Reading that were laid on due to extra demand on race days. It was seldom used and was mothballed sometime in the early 2000s. The third rail and signalling remains intact.

Where trains are running from London through to Guildford or vice versa, they use platform 2. All lines are bi-directional.

== Services ==
All services at Ascot are operated by South Western Railway.

The typical off-peak service in trains per hour is:

- 2 tph to London Waterloo via Richmond
- 2 tph to Reading
- 2 tph to Aldershot via Camberley

Additional services call at the station during the peak hours. In addition, during the Royal Ascot week, the services through the station are significantly increased.

On Sundays, the services to and from Aldershot are reduced to hourly and are extended to and from Guildford.

| Preceding station | National Rail | Following station |
|---|---|---|
| Sunningdale | South Western Railway Waterloo to Reading Line | Martins Heron |
| Terminus | South Western Railway Ascot–Ash Vale line | Bagshot |

== Sources ==
- Body, G (1984). PSL Field Guides – Railways of the Southern Region. Cambridge: Patrick Stephens Ltd. pp. 35–36. ISBN 0-85059-664-5.
- Butt, R. V. J. (October 1995). The Directory of Railway Stations: details every public and private passenger station, halt, platform and stopping place, past and present (1st ed.). Sparkford: Patrick Stephens Ltd. ISBN 978-1-85260-508-7. OCLC 60251199. OL 11956311M.
- Jowett, Alan (2000). Jowett's Nationalised Railway Atlas (1st ed.). Penryn, Cornwall: Atlantic Transport Publishers. ISBN 978-0-906899-99-1. OCLC 228266687.
- Jowett, Alan (March 1989). Jowett's Railway Atlas of Great Britain and Ireland: From Pre-Grouping to the Present Day (1st ed.). Sparkford: Patrick Stephens Ltd. ISBN 978-1-85260-086-0. OCLC 22311137.
