= Brookwood railway station =

Railway station in Surrey, England

Brookwood
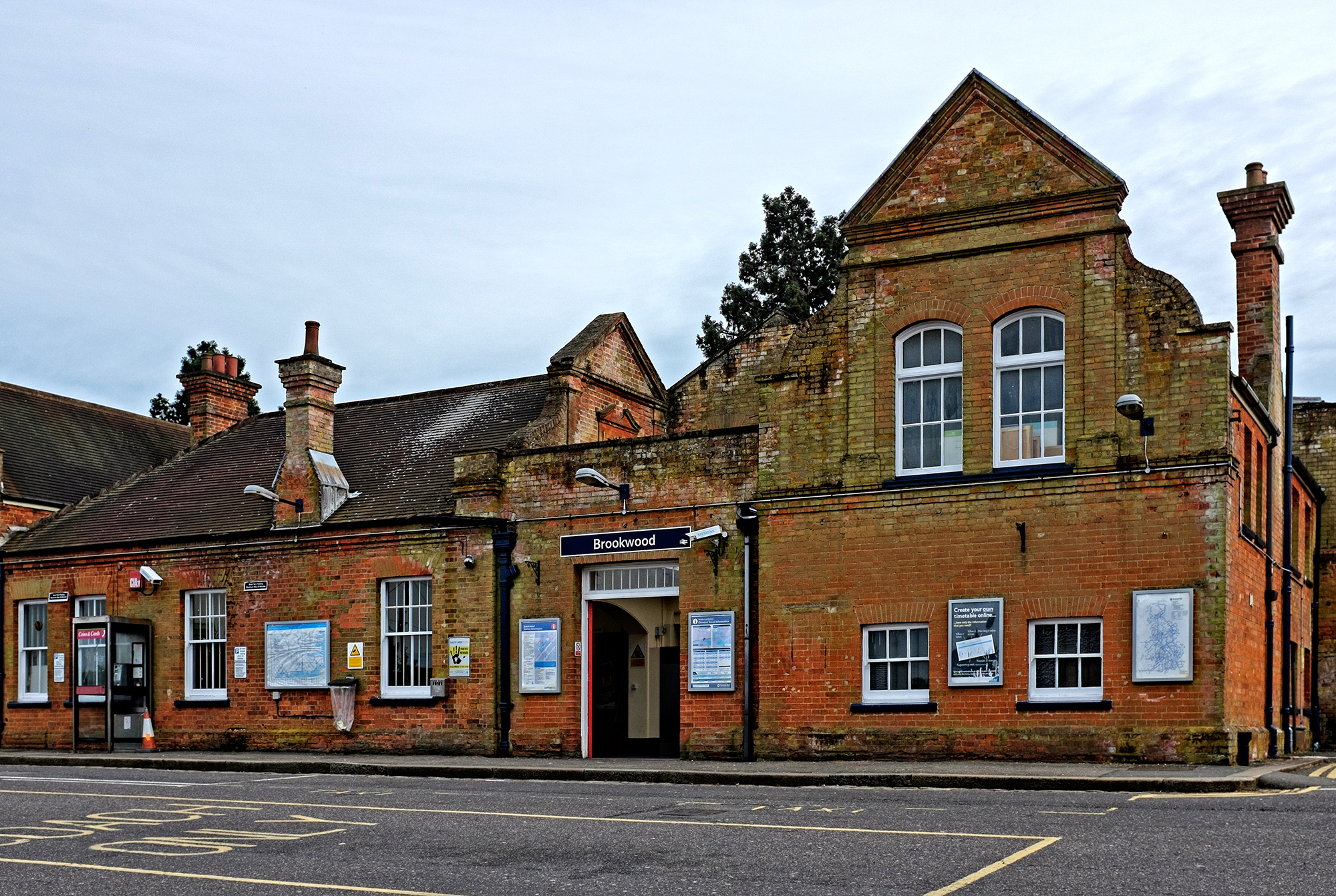
- Brookwood railway station

General information
- Location: Brookwood, Borough of Woking; England
- Coordinates: 51°18′14″N 0°38′10″W
- Grid reference: SU951569
- Manager: South Western Railway
- Platforms: 2
- Tracks: 4

Other information
- Station code: BKO
- Classification: DfT category C2

History
- Opened: 1 June 1864

Passengers
- 2020/21: ▼0.205 million
- Interchange: ▼14,860
- 2021/22: ▲0.553 million
- Interchange: ▲35,208
- 2022/23: ▲0.723 million
- Interchange: ▲45,458
- 2023/24: ▲0.784 million
- Interchange: ▲47,009
- 2024/25: ▲0.875 million
- Interchange: ▲54,611
Location
Notes
- Passenger statistics from the Office of Rail and Road

Brookwood railway station serves the village of Brookwood, in Surrey, England. It lies 27 miles 79 chains (45.0 km) down the line from London Waterloo.

== History ==
The London and Southampton Railway (L&SR) was authorised on 25 July 1834. It was built and opened in stages, with the second section, that between Woking (then known as Woking Common) and Winchfield, opening on 24 September 1838. There was only one intermediate station on this section, at Farnborough. On 4 June 1839, the L&SR was renamed the London and South Western Railway (LSWR).

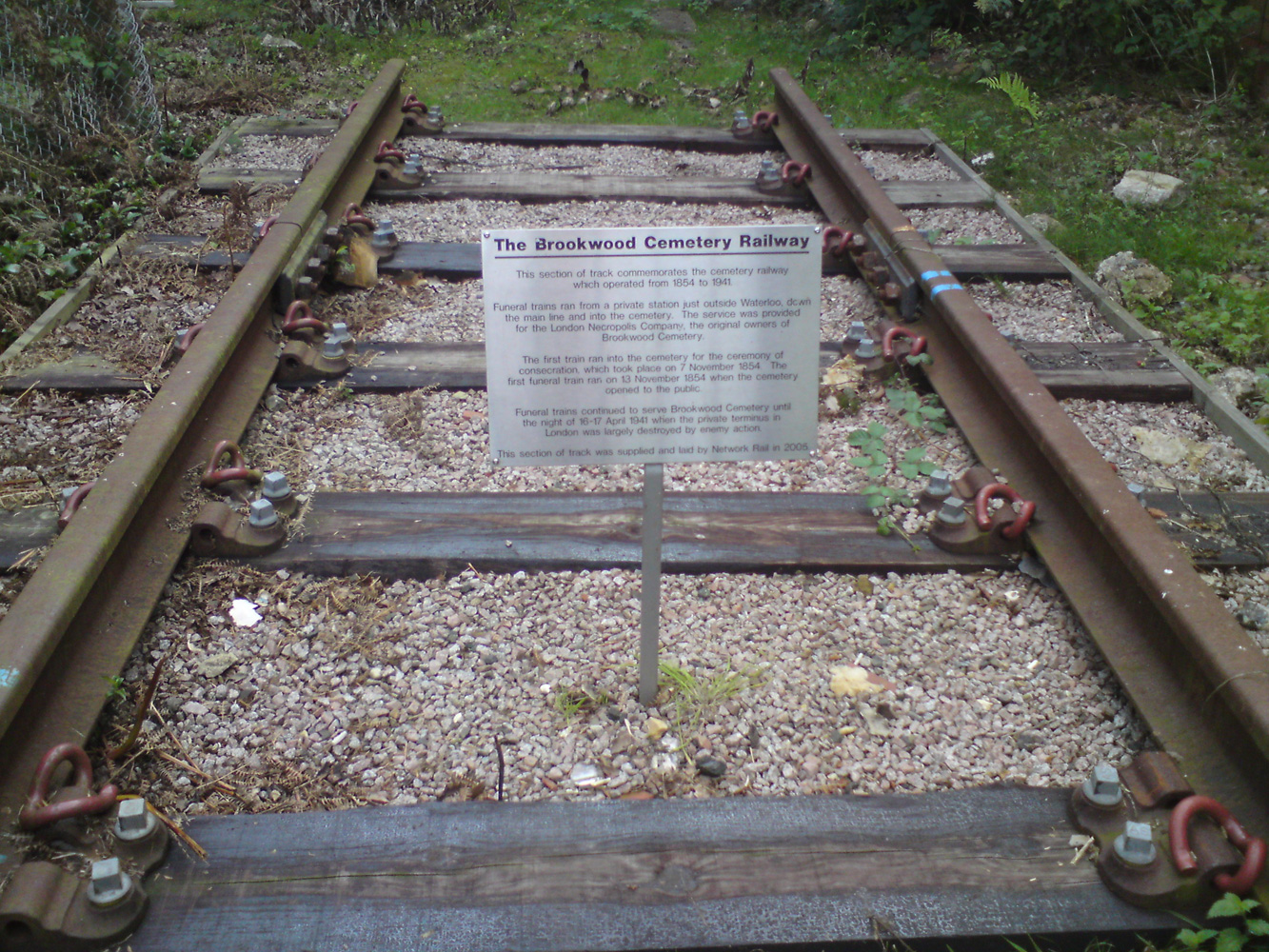
Brookwood Cemetery Railway - commemorative track

Funeral trains from London to Woking Cemetery first ran in 1849. The opening of Brookwood Cemetery (and the associated London Necropolis railway station close to London Waterloo) led to an increase in the funeral traffic. A branch line left from the main line station to serve two stations within the cemetery, Brookwood Cemetery North and Brookwood Cemetery South. In June 1863, the LSWR agreed to provide a station on the main line, to serve both the adjacent cemetery and Brookwood village; this opened on 1 June 1864.

A branch line to the north of the line at Brookwood was opened on 14 July 1890. It served Bisley Camp of the National Rifle Association.

The station was reconstructed in 1903, with a new down platform, 576 feet (176 m) long, being built to the south of the original. It was connected to the up platform by a new subway, the footbridge being removed. This made room for the double-track main line to be quadrupled; the new tracks through the station (1 mile 70 chains (3.0 km) between Brookwood East and Pirbright Junction) being brought into use on 15 November 1903. New pneumatic signalling between Woking and Basingstoke was provided between 1904 and 1907; the stretch between Farnborough and Woking was brought into use during June–July 1907, and included a new signal box at Brookwood, having 35 working levers. This box, like the previous Brookwood East manual signalbox, was on the down side of the line.

Operation of the Bisley branch was transferred to the War Office on 1 March 1917, but was returned to the LSWR on 8 August 1918.

The cemetery branch line (and stations) have now closed, but the main line station remains and is now a popular commuter station on the South West Main Line between London Waterloo and Basingstoke, served by South Western Railway. The exit to the cemetery remains as shown on the station map.

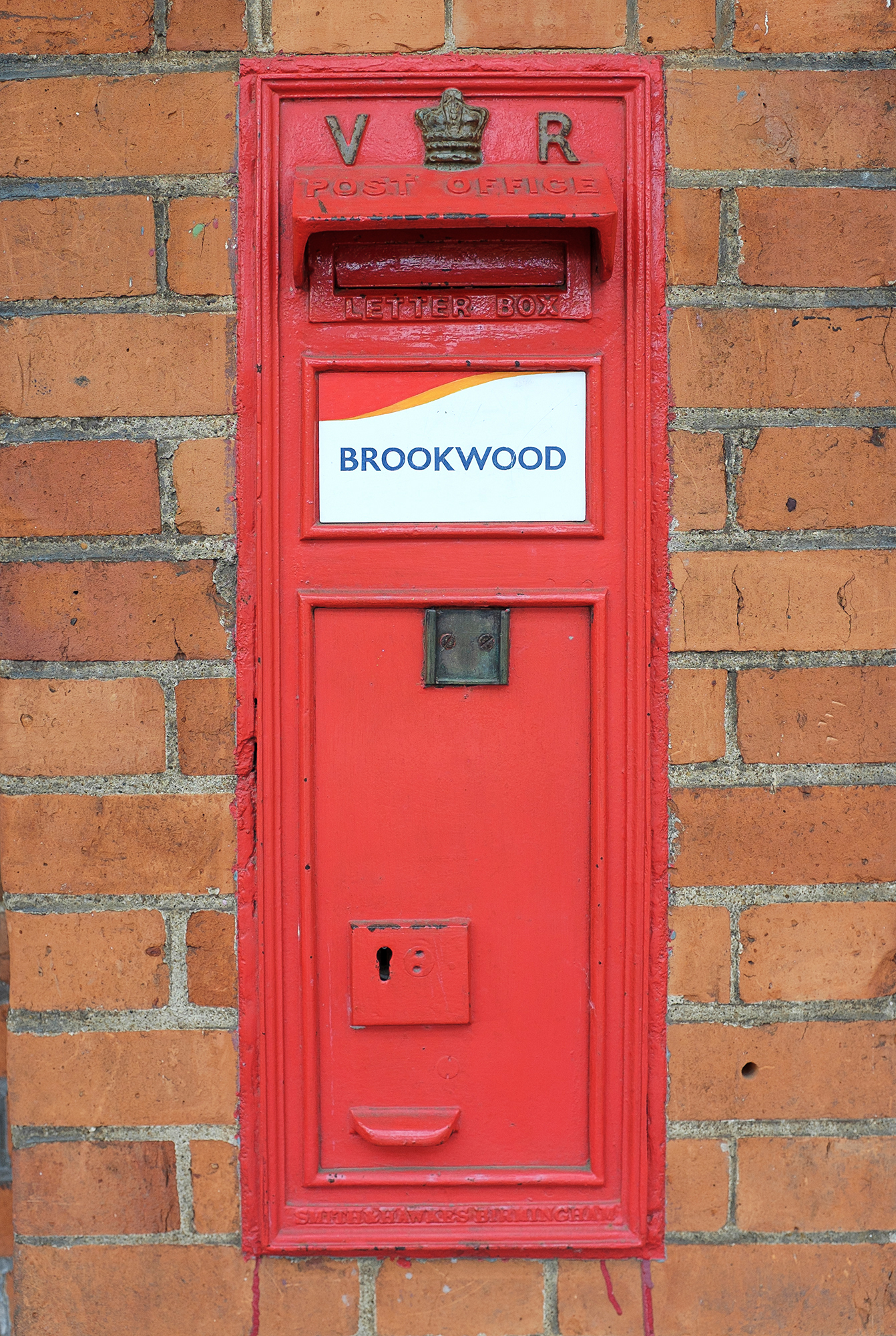
Victorian postbox on the platform at Brookwood Station

== Services ==
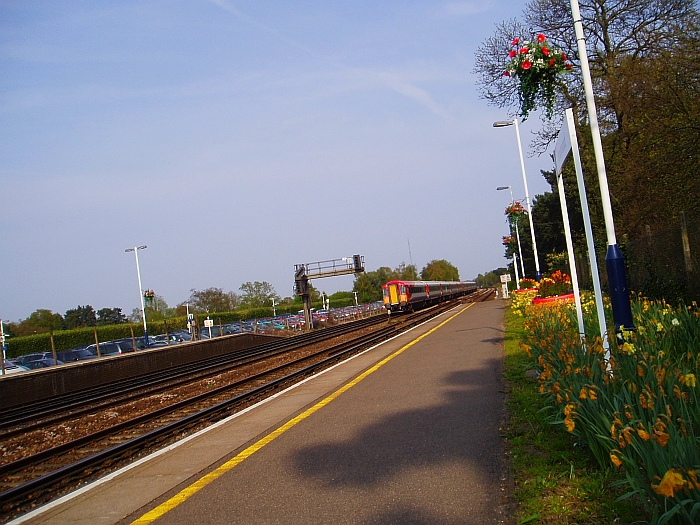
View towards London Waterloo in May 2006

South Western Railway operates all services at Brookwood.

The typical Monday-Saturday off-peak service is:

- 4 trains per hour (tph) to London Waterloo
- 2 tph to Basingstoke
- 2 tph to Alton.

On Sundays, this becomes:

- 2 tph to London Waterloo (joining at Woking)
- 1 tph to Basingstoke
- 1 tph to Alton.

Preceding station	National Rail	Following station
Woking	South Western Railway; South West Main Line	Farnborough (Main)
Woking	South Western Railway; Alton Line	Ash Vale
