= Camberley railway station =

Railway station in Surrey, England

Coordinates: 51°20′10″N 0°44′42″W

Camberley
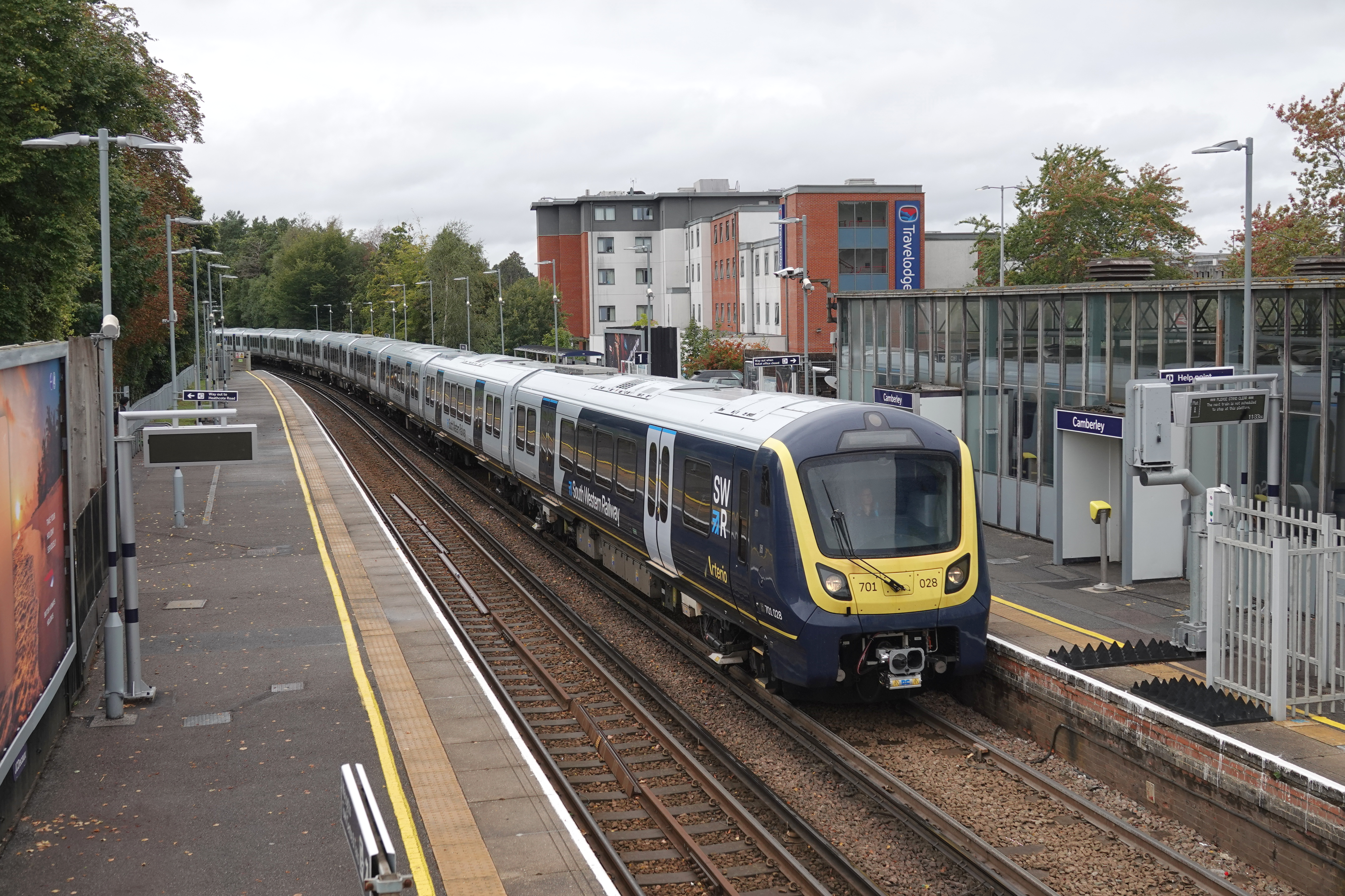

General information
- Location: Camberley, Surrey Heath; England
- Grid reference: SU875604
- Managed by: South Western Railway
- Platforms: 2

Other information
- Station code: CAM
- Classification: DfT category D

History
- Opened: 18 March 1878

Passengers
- 2020/21: ▼83,076
- 2021/22: ▲0.237 million
- 2022/23: ▲0.288 million
- 2023/24: ▲0.341 million
- 2024/25: ▲0.364 million
Location
Notes
- Passenger statistics from the Office of Rail and Road

Camberley railway station serves the town of Camberley, in Surrey, England. It is a stop on the Ascot–Ash Vale line, 35 miles 30 chains (56.9 km) from London Waterloo. The station is operated by South Western Railway, along with all trains serving it.

== History ==
Opened in 1878 by the London and South Western Railway, when it was known as Camberley & York Town, the station gained a second platform fifteen years later when the line through here was doubled.

The route was electrified, on the third rail system at 650 volts DC, by the Southern Railway on 1 January 1939.

The station was completely rebuilt in 1975.

The station buildings are now used by the Autism Trust, with plans to open a cafe at the station.

== Services ==
All services at Camberley are operated by South Western Railway, using Class 450 electric multiple units.

The typical off-peak service is two trains per hour in each direction between Ascot and Aldershot. During peak hours, the station is served by two morning services that continue beyond Ascot to London Waterloo, via Staines, as well two evening services from London Waterloo. On Sundays, the service is reduced to hourly in each direction and eastbound services are extended beyond Aldershot to Guildford.

Preceding station	National Rail	Following station
Bagshot	South Western Railway Ascot to Guildford Line	Frimley
