= Sunningdale railway station =

Railway station in Berkshire, England

Coordinates: 51°23′32″N 0°37′59″W

Sunningdale
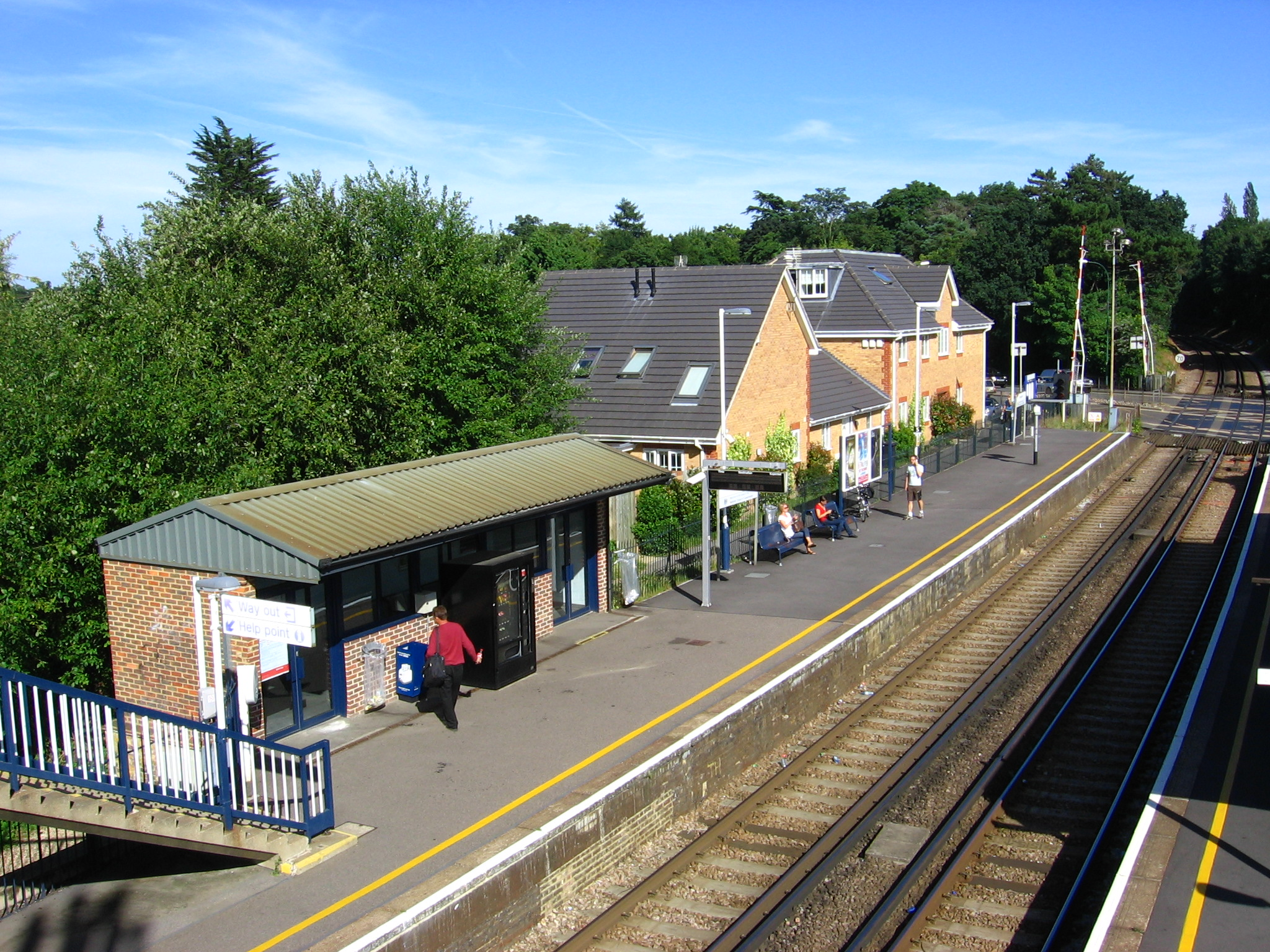
- Sunningdale railway station, as seen from the bridge above the platforms in the direction of Virginia Water

General information
- Location: Sunningdale, Windsor and Maidenhead; England
- Grid reference: SU952667
- Managed by: South Western Railway
- Platforms: 2

Other information
- Station code: SNG
- Classification: DfT category C2

History
- Opened: 4 June 1856
- Pre-grouping: London and South Western Railway
- Post-grouping: Southern Railway

Passengers
- 2020/21: ▼0.117 million
- 2021/22: ▲0.364 million
- 2022/23: ▲0.461 million
- 2023/24: ▲0.512 million
- 2024/25: ▲0.597 million
Location
Notes
- Passenger statistics from the Office of Rail and Road

Sunningdale railway station serves the village of Sunningdale, in Berkshire, England. It is 26 miles 71 chains (43.3 km) down the line from London Waterloo.

== History ==
The London and South Western Railway opened the station on 4 June 1856. The station is on the Waterloo to Reading line in Broomhall. Prior to boundary changes enacted in 1995, it was part of the civil parish of Windlesham, in Surrey.

== Services ==
All services at Sunningdale are operated by South Western Railway.

The typical off-peak service in trains per hour is:

- 2 tph to London Waterloo, via Richmond
- 2 tph to Reading

Additional services, including trains to and from Camberley and Aldershot, call at the station during peak hours.

Preceding station	National Rail	Following station
Longcross	South Western Railway Waterloo to Reading Line	Ascot
