= Byfleet & New Haw railway station =

Railway station in Surrey, England

Byfleet & New Haw
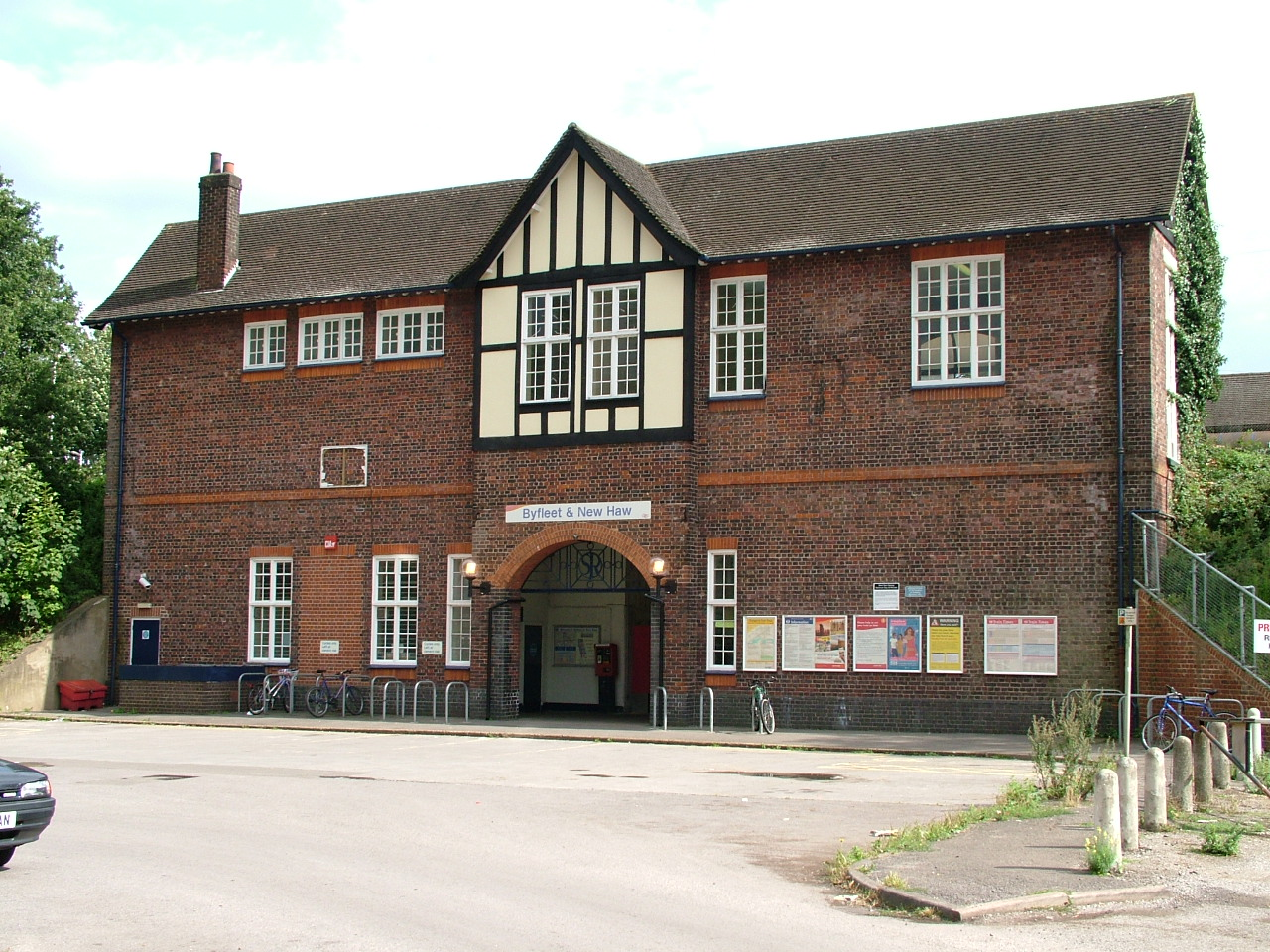
- Byfleet & New Haw Station, August 2006

General information
- Location: Byfleet, Borough of Runnymede; England
- Coordinates: 51°20′59″N 0°28′52″W
- Grid reference: TQ058622
- Manager: South Western Railway
- Platforms: 2
- Tracks: 4

Other information
- Station code: BFN
- Classification: DfT category E

History
- Opened: 10 July 1927

Passengers
- 2020/21: ▼0.163 million
- 2021/22: ▲0.278 million
- 2022/23: ▲0.317 million
- 2023/24: ▲0.369 million
- 2024/25: ▲0.408 million
Location
Notes
- Passenger statistics from the Office of Rail and Road

Byfleet & New Haw railway station is on the South West Main Line, operated by South Western Railway and generally served by trains on the London to Woking route. The station is at the northern edge of Byfleet with the village of New Haw immediately to the north and the M25 motorway within 400 m (1,300 ft) to the west.

It is in the county of Surrey and 500 m (1,600 ft) from the Brooklands business, industrial, museum and retail estate in the south west of Weybridge. It is 20 miles 32 chains (32.8 km) from London Waterloo (Note: Railways in the United Kingdom historically are measured in miles and chains. There are 80 chains to one mile.) and is situated between Weybridge and West Byfleet.

== History ==
The station was designed by the architect James Robb Scott and opened on 10 July 1927 to cater for the increasing local population. The opening of the Vickers aircraft factory in 1911 led to Byfleet's population doubling in just ten years. Many new houses were built to accommodate the factory workers.

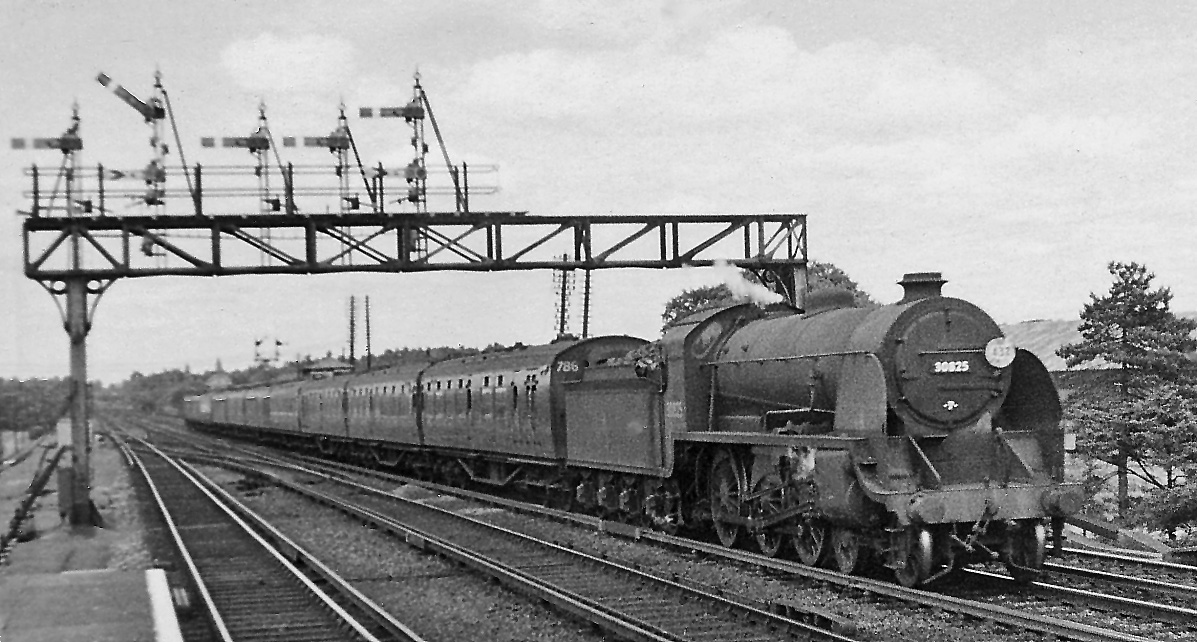
Down stopping train passing West Weybridge station in 1953

The station was originally called "West Weybridge" and changed to its present name in June 1962.

It is on a section of railway that forms part of the South West Main Line's original form, the London and Southampton Railway, which was built in stages. The first stage opened in May 1838 and joined the London Terminus in Nine Elms with Woking Common, now Woking.

Byfleet and New Haw Station is in close proximity to the historical Brooklands racetrack and aerodrome, which date back to 1907. The racetrack hosted the 1927 British Grand Prix a few months after the station opened.

== Services ==
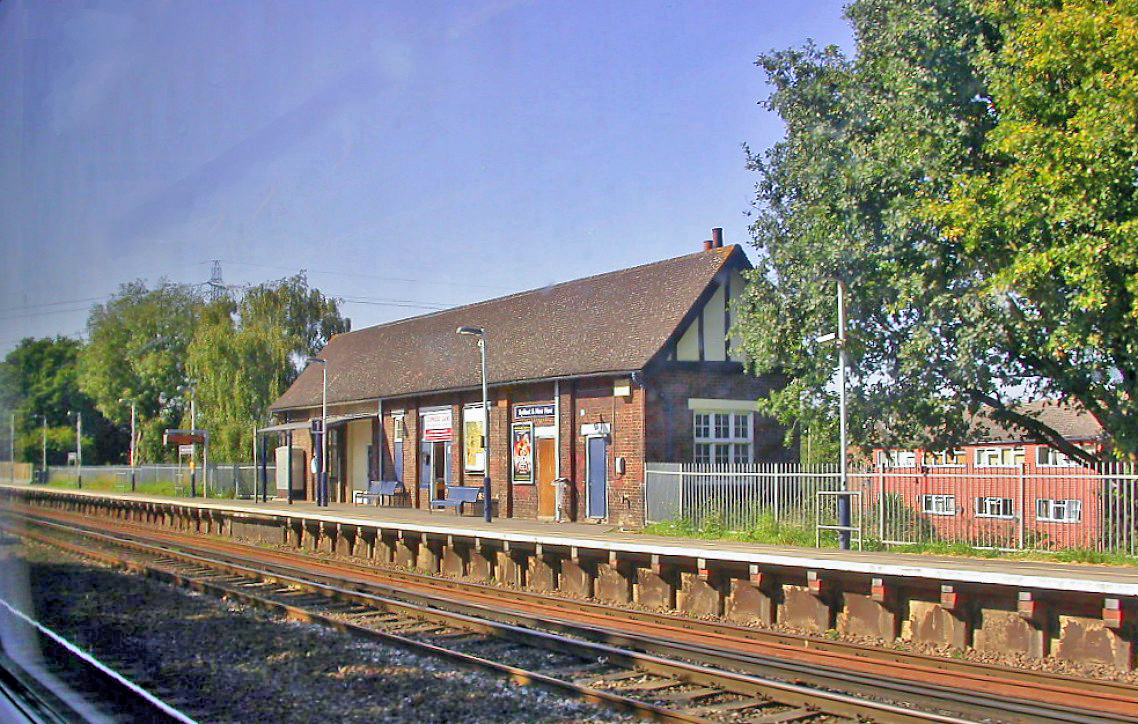
The London bound platform

All services at Byfleet & New Haw are operated by South Western Railway.

The typical off-peak service in trains per hour is:

- 2 tph to London Waterloo via Surbiton
- 2 tph to Woking

Additional services call at the station during the peak hours.

On Sundays, the services to Woking are extended to and from Guildford and the station is also served by an additional hourly service between Woking and London Waterloo that runs via Staines and Hounslow instead of via Surbiton.

Preceding station	National Rail	Following station
Weybridge	South Western Railway Waterloo to Woking	West Byfleet
Addlestone	South Western Railway: Chertsey Branch Line; Limited Service	West Byfleet

== Ticket office and station staff ==
Byfleet and New Haw's ticket office is staffed on a part-time basis but has no platform staff. There is an automated ticket machine at the bottom of the first staircase.

=== Ticket Office Opening Hours ===
Monday-Friday	06:40-10:30
Saturday	09:00-13:00
Sunday	Closed

== Refurbishment ==
In March 2013, work began to refurbish the booking hall, subway and stairwells at the station. Works were completed in August 2013.
