= Egham railway station =

Railway station in Surrey, England

Coordinates: 51°25′48″N 0°32′49″W

Egham
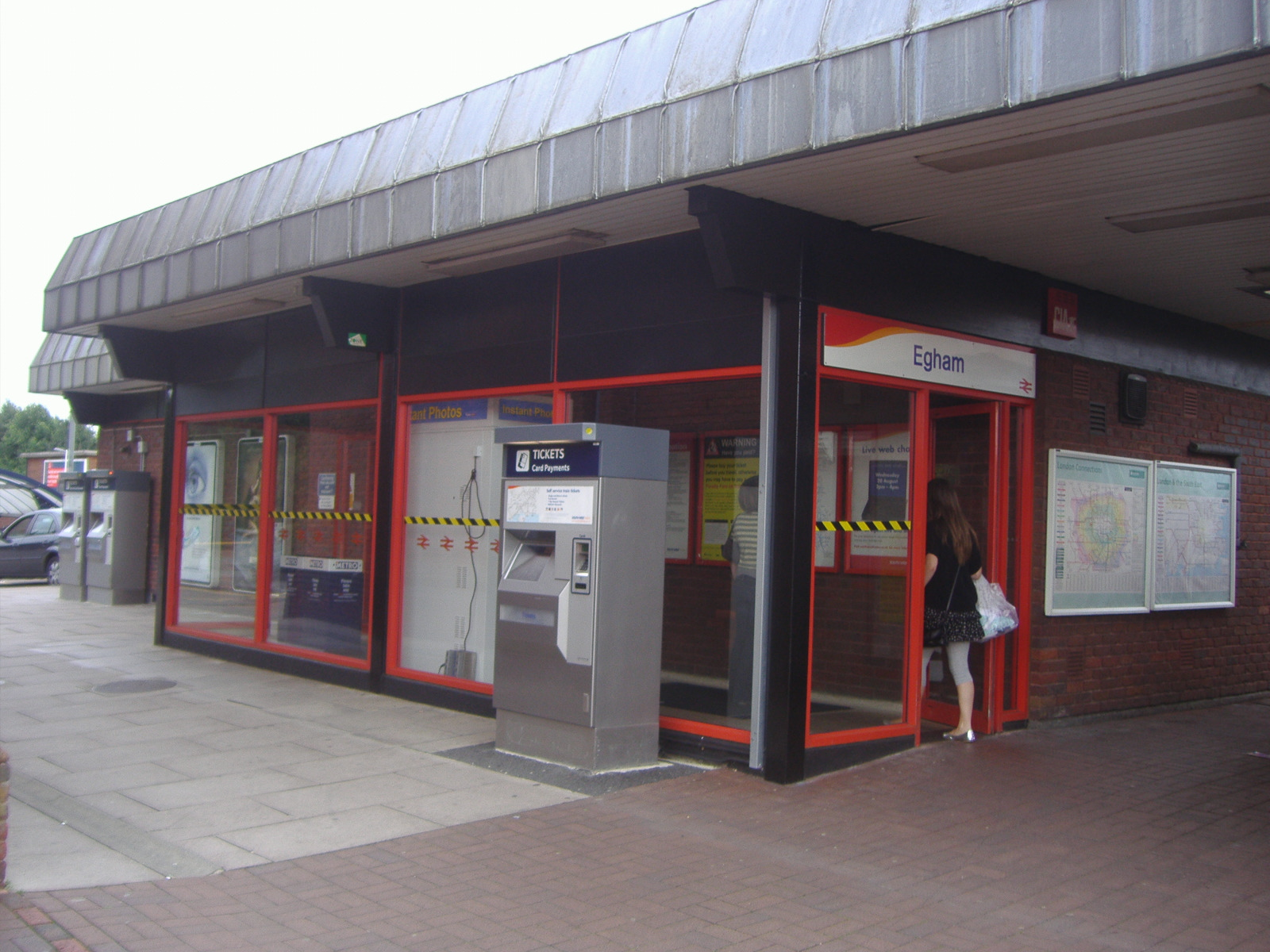

General information
- Location: Egham, Surrey, Runnymede; England
- Grid reference: TQ011710
- Managed by: South Western Railway
- Platforms: 2

Other information
- Station code: EGH
- Classification: DfT category C2

History
- Opened: 4 June 1856

Passengers
- 2020/21: ▼0.434 million
- 2021/22: ▲1.262 million
- 2022/23: ▲1.559 million
- 2023/24: ▲1.682 million
- 2024/25: ▲1.852 million
Location
Notes
- Passenger statistics from the Office of Rail and Road

Egham railway station serves the town of Egham, in Surrey, England. The station is owned by Network Rail and managed by South Western Railway, which also provides all services. The station lies on the Waterloo to Reading line, 21 miles 2 chains (33.8 km) from London Waterloo, between Virginia Water and Staines; it is also served by trains to Weybridge.

The station signs read Egham, for Royal Holloway, University of London; many students from the University and the nearby Strode's College use the station for travel to and from Egham.

== History ==
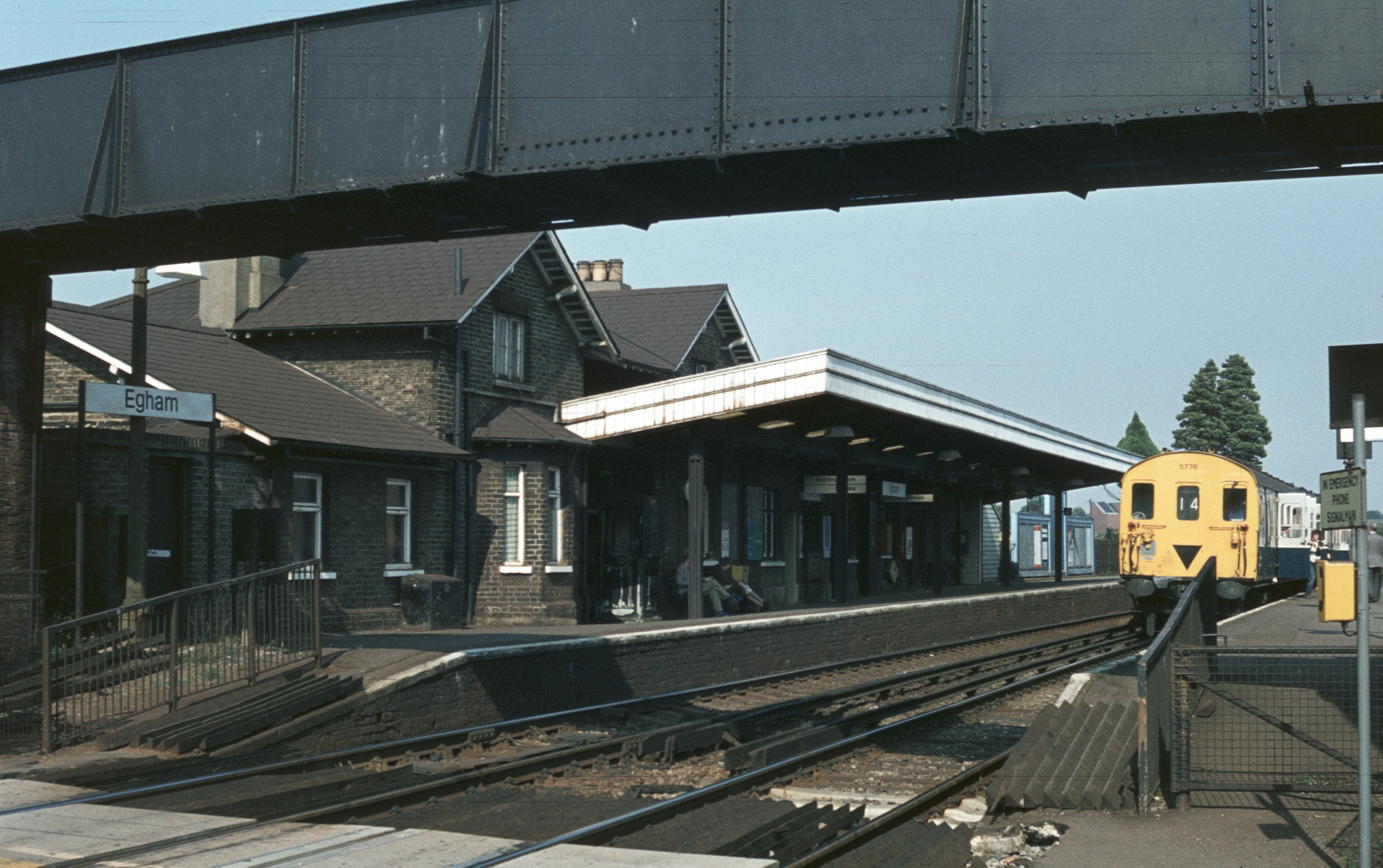
Former station building in 1981

Beginning in 1846, proposals were made for a line connecting Egham to Waterloo. In 1852, the Staines, Wokingham & Woking Junction Railway was proposed and then approved the following year. Despite objections to the railway's 12 proposed road crossings, the refusal of landowners to sell their properties and the death of two workers, the line opened on 4 June 1856 operated by the London and South Western Railway (LSWR). The line was electrified in 1939.

A new station building, built by British Rail on the London-bound platform, was opened in 1985 by Lady Lawrence.

=== Accidents ===
On 7 June 1864, two trains running from Ascot to London collided, resulting in the deaths of six people. The trains had been scheduled to leave Ascot at five minute intervals, but the first train was delayed at Egham due to a passenger being removed for card-sharping, causing a late departure at 7:28pm when it was struck by the following train.

On 17 October 2000, a bus became trapped between the barriers at Pooley Green crossing and was subsequently struck by an empty train. The bus was dragged 100 metres causing damage to nearby houses. All eight bus passengers were evacuated before the collision.

== Services ==
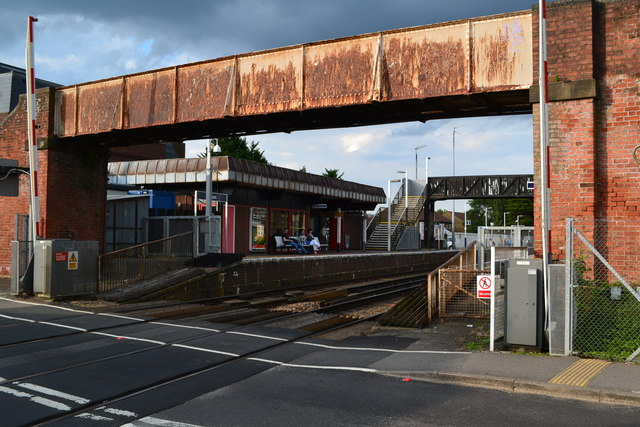
The current station building in 2014

All services at Egham are operated by South Western Railway.

The typical off-peak service in trains per hour is:

- 4 tph to London Waterloo (2 of these are stopping services via Hounslow and 2 are semi-fast via Richmond)
- 2 tph to Weybridge
- 2 tph to Reading via Bracknell

Additional services, including trains to and from Camberley and Aldershot, call at the station during peak hours.

On Sundays, the stopping services between Weybridge and London Waterloo are reduced to hourly and southbound trains run to and from Woking instead of Weybridge.

Preceding station	National Rail	Following station
Staines	South Western Railway Waterloo to Reading Line	Virginia Water
Staines	South Western Railway Chertsey Branch Line	Virginia Water
