= Virginia Water railway station =

Railway station in Surrey, England

Coordinates: 51°24′07″N 0°33′43″W

Virginia Water
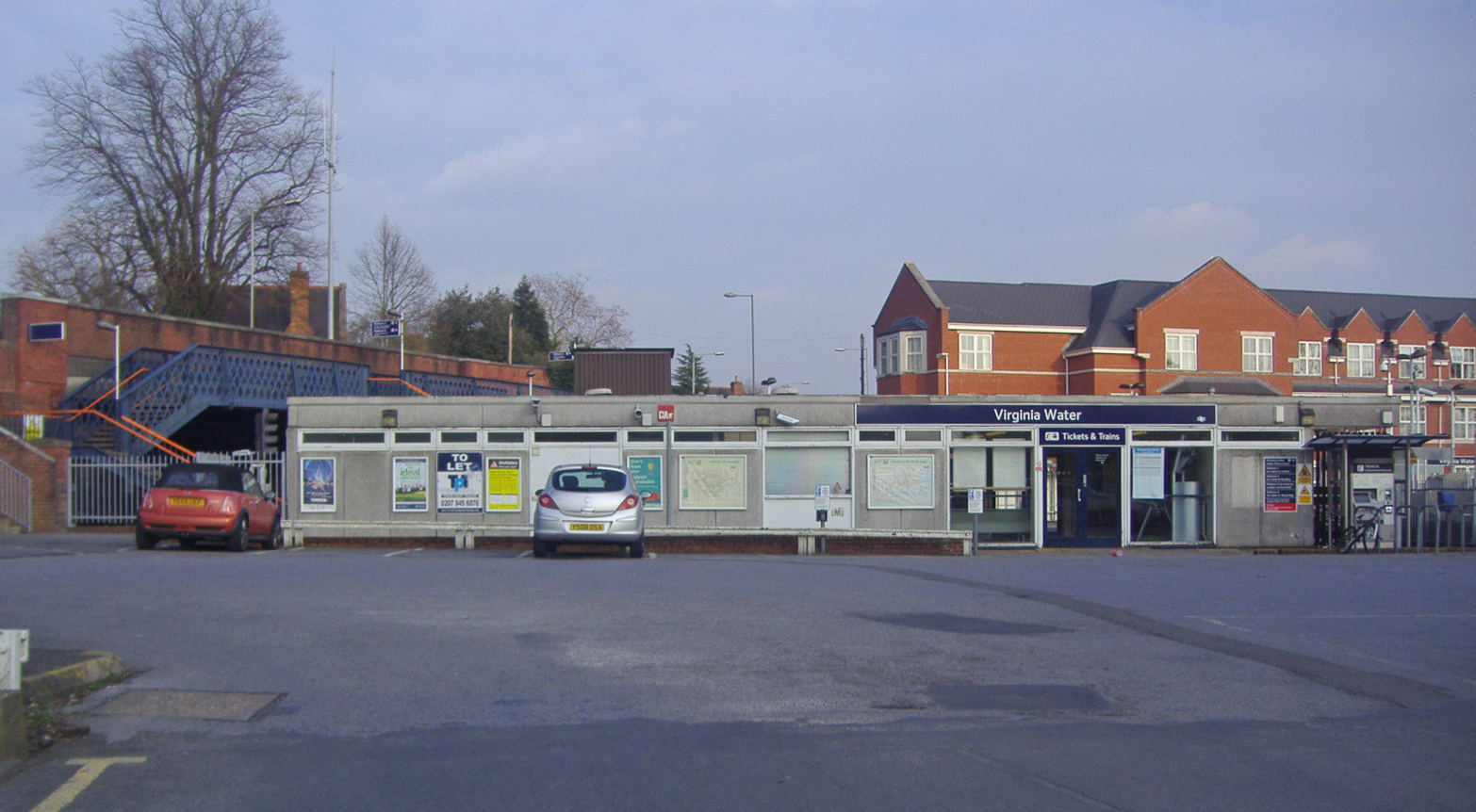
- Interactive map of Virginia Water

General information
- Local authority: Virginia Water, Runnymede
- Grid reference: TQ001679
- Managed by: South Western Railway
- Station code: VIR
- DfT category: D
- Number of platforms: 4
- Accessible: Yes

National Rail annual entry and exit
- 2020–21: ▼0.150 million
- Interchange: ▼32,770
- 2021–22: ▲0.397 million
- Interchange: ▲85,150
- 2022–23: ▲0.479 million
- Interchange: ▲0.122 million
- 2023–24: ▲0.571 million
- Interchange: ▼83,186
- 2024–25: ▲0.650 million
- Interchange: ▲94,411

Key dates
- 4 June 1856: Opened

Other information
- External links: Departures; Facilities

Virginia Water railway station serves the village of Virginia Water, in Surrey, England. It is 23 miles 15 chains (37.3 km) down the line from London Waterloo. The station, and all trains serving it, are operated by South Western Railway.

The Waterloo to Reading Line and the Chertsey Branch Line join here with the platforms at the junction, as seen in the photograph (taken facing south). Trains from Weybridge and to Reading use either side of a V-shaped platform, allowing cross-platform interchange; the junction of the tracks is at the London end of the station. This station now has ticket barriers operational.

== History ==
The line from Staines to Ascot including this station, was opened by the London and South Western Railway on 4 June 1856; the section to Weybridge opened on 1 October 1866. Formerly a chord south of the station connected the Chertsey and Reading lines.

The station received a new station building in 1973 by British Rail, similarly treated to Wokingham and Sunningdale, from prefabricated concrete. The building is at the right of the photograph.

Modernisation in recent years provides ticket barriers and a bridge for step free access to platforms, incorporating lifts.

== Platforms ==
Virginia Water station has four platforms.

- Platform 1 - Semi-fast trains to London Waterloo via Richmond.
- Platform 2 - Trains to Ascot, Reading and stations to Farnham in peak hours.
- Platform 3 - Stopping service to London Waterloo via Hounslow.
- Platform 4 - Trains to Weybridge, or Woking on Sunday.

== Services ==
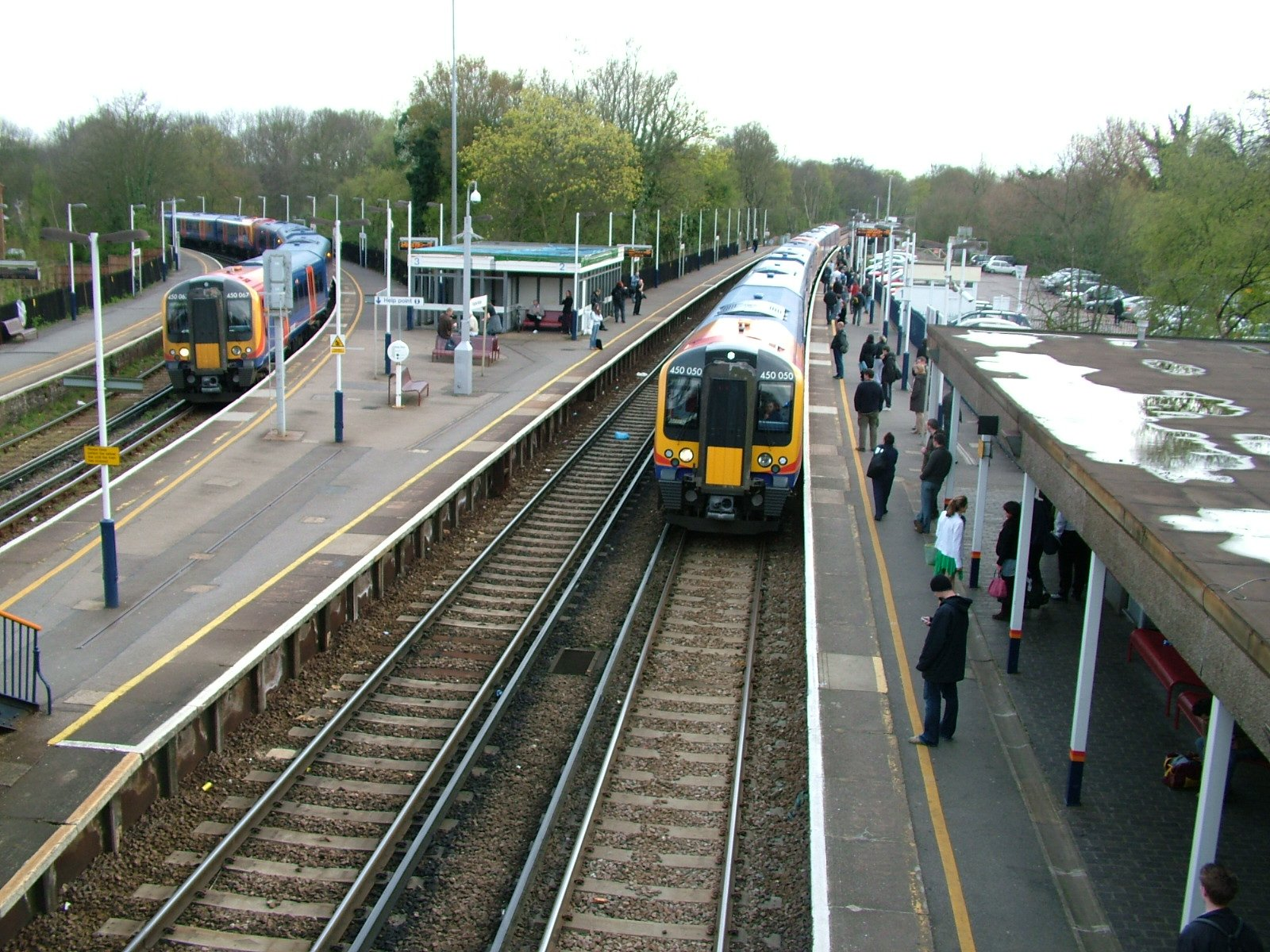
Trains from Weybridge (left) and Reading (right) await departure for London Waterloo at Virginia Water

All services at Virginia Water are operated by South Western Railway.

The typical off-peak service in trains per hour is:

- 4 tph to London Waterloo (2 of these are stopping services via Hounslow and 2 are semi-fast via Richmond)
- 2 tph to Weybridge
- 2 tph to Reading via Bracknell

Additional services, including trains to and from Camberley and Aldershot call at the station during the peak hours.

On Sundays, the stopping services between Weybridge and London Waterloo are reduced to hourly and southbound trains run to and from Woking instead of Weybridge.

Preceding station	National Rail	Following station
Egham	South Western Railway Waterloo to Reading Line	Longcross
Egham	South Western Railway Chertsey Branch Line	Chertsey
