= West Byfleet railway station =

Railway station serving the village of West Byfleet, Surrey, England

West Byfleet
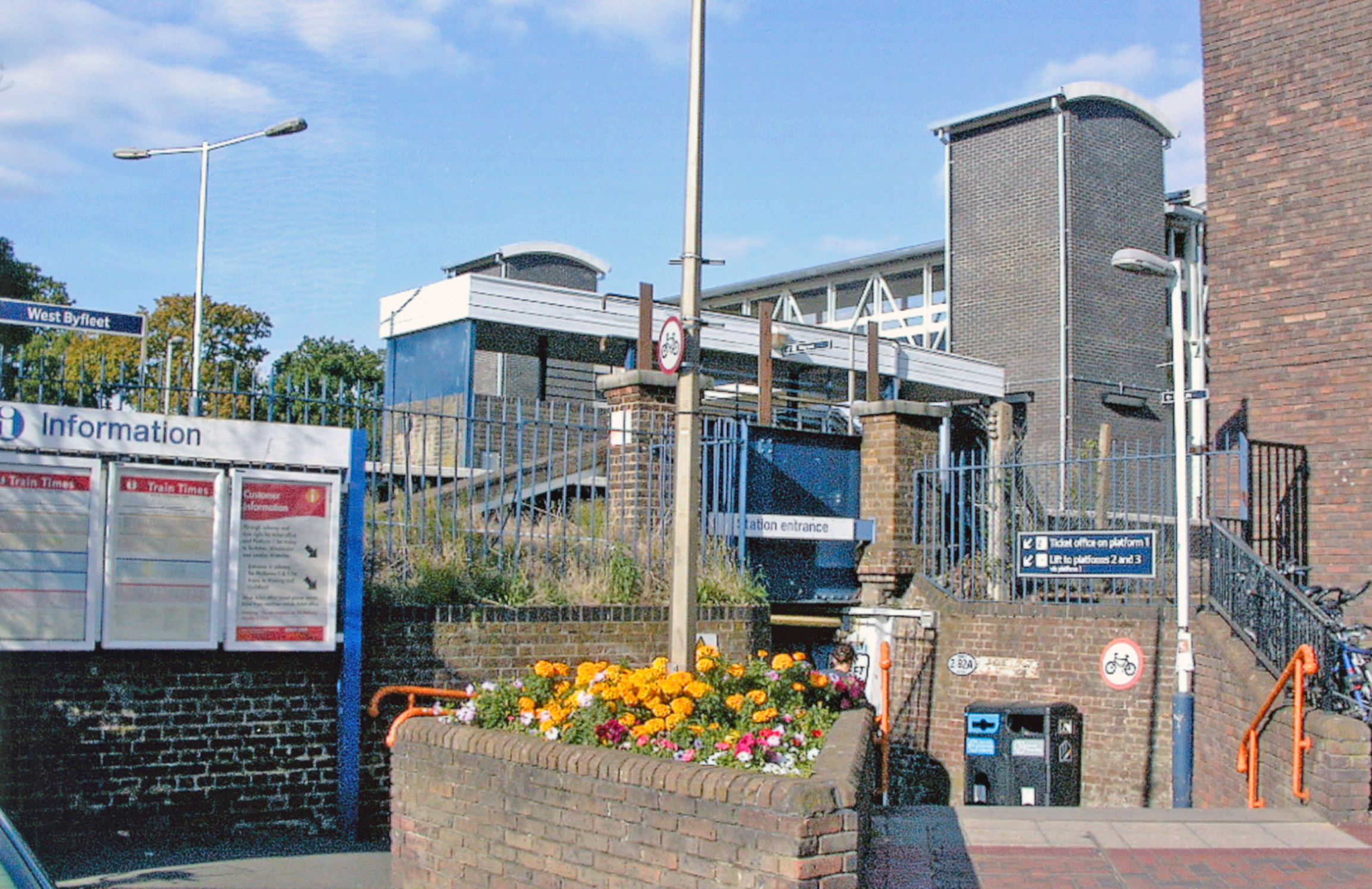

General information
- Location: West Byfleet, Borough of Woking; England
- Coordinates: 51°20′22″N 0°30′19″W
- Grid reference: TQ041610
- Managed by: South Western Railway
- Platforms: 3
- Tracks: 4

Other information
- Station code: WBY
- Classification: DfT category C2

History
- Opened: 1 December 1887

Passengers
- 2020/21: ▼0.246 million
- 2021/22: ▲0.668 million
- 2022/23: ▲0.907 million
- 2023/24: ▲1.045 million
- 2024/25: ▲1.172 million
Location
Notes
- Passenger statistics from the Office of Rail and Road

West Byfleet railway station is a railway station serving the village of West Byfleet, which forms part of the borough of Woking in the English county of Surrey.

The station is on the South West Main Line, 21 miles 54 chains (34.9 km) from London Waterloo. (Note: Railways in the United Kingdom historically are measured in miles and chains. There are 80 chains to one mile.)

== History ==
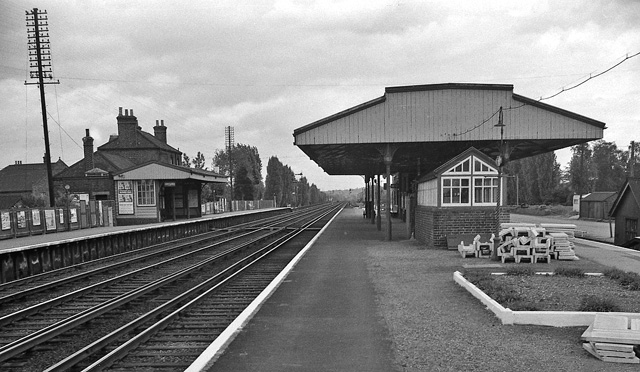
West Byfleet Station in 1962

It opened in December 1887 as Byfleet, 49 years after the line was first constructed through the area. The station was renamed from Byfleet to West Byfleet on commencement of the Summer timetable, 1950. This reflected the name of the community that had developed around it, being a mile west of the original Byfleet village. West Byfleet signal box closed in March 1970.

=== Accidents and incidents ===
On 27 December 1946 the station was the scene of the derailment of a Bournemouth to London express service hauled by SR Lord Nelson class 4-6-0, 851 Sir Francis Drake. Although the entire 12 coach train and its engine were derailed at 60 mph (97 km/h), the coaches remained upright and in line, helped by buckeye couplings being fitted to the leading six coaches. Only three people suffered minor injuries.

== Services ==
The station is served by all Alton and Woking (stopping) services from London Waterloo.

It adjoins West Byfleet and Woodham which are suburban settlements in the boroughs of Woking and Runnymede, to the south and north of the line, respectively. As to other towns it is the closest station to parts of the town/suburb of Byfleet and parts of the semi-rural suburb of Pyrford.

The station has three platforms, one of which (platform 2) is rarely used in line with nearby other South West Main Line stations. The station competes in the broadest sense, not of train company, with faster services at the next nearest station on the line, Woking station. Both are served by bus routes outside of the Transport for London fare-capped scheme.

As of April 2015 at off-peak times the station has 4 trains per hour in each direction, alternating between Woking and Alton as to the end or start destination to the south-west and both having London (Waterloo) as their north-east terminus. The Alton services calling at fewer intermediate stations (being semi-fast).

Preceding station	National Rail	Following station
Surbiton or Weybridge	South Western Railway; Alton line	Woking
Byfleet & New Haw	South Western Railway; Waterloo to Woking	Woking

== Cultural references ==
The station frontage appeared in the 1977 movie Adventures of a Private Eye starring Christopher Neil.
