= Addlestone railway station =

Railway station in Surrey, England

Addlestone
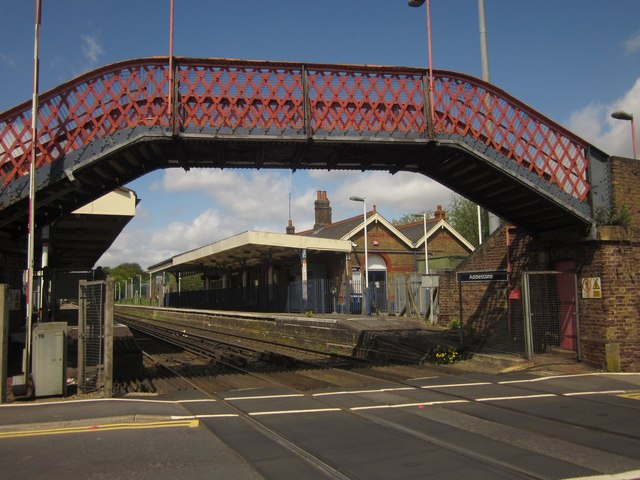

General information
- Location: Addlestone, Runnymede; England
- Coordinates: 51°22′23″N 0°29′02″W
- Grid reference: TQ055648
- Managed by: South Western Railway
- Platforms: 2

Other information
- Station code: ASN
- Classification: DfT category E

History
- Opened: 14 February 1848

Passengers
- 2020/21: ▼96,206
- 2021/22: ▲0.239 million
- 2022/23: ▲0.272 million
- 2023/24: ▲0.331 million
- 2024/25: ▲0.382 million
Location
Notes
- Passenger statistics from the Office of Rail and Road

Addlestone railway station serves the town of Addlestone, in the Runnymede District of Surrey, England. It is located on the Chertsey Branch Line and is managed by South Western Railway.

== History ==
The station was opened, along with the branch line, on 14 February 1848 by the London and South Western Railway. It became part of the Southern Railway during the Grouping of 1923. The line then passed on to the Southern Region of British Railways on nationalisation in 1948.

When sectorisation was introduced, the station was served by Network SouthEast until the privatisation of British Rail.

== Description ==
Addlestone comprises up and down platforms, both having brick buildings; the main building is on the down side. There is a level crossing with Station Road (B3121) on the south side of the station.

Just under a mile south of the station, the line crosses the River Wey. Southbound trains approach Addlestone Junction and can either head westward towards Byfleet and New Haw (and subsequent stations on the South West Main Line) or head eastward to terminate at Weybridge.

== Services ==
All services at Addlestone are operated by South Western Railway.

The typical off-peak service in trains per hour is:

- 2 tph to London Waterloo via Hounslow
- 2 tph to Weybridge.

On Sundays, the service is reduced to hourly in each direction and trains run to and from Woking instead of Weybridge.

Preceding station	National Rail	Following station
Chertsey	South Western Railway Chertsey Branch Line	Weybridge
Chertsey	South Western Railway Chertsey Branch Line	Byfleet & New Haw Limited Service

== Connections ==
Bus routes 431 and 461, both operated on behalf of Surrey County Council, stop outside the station.
