= Sarson =

Sarson is a surname. Notable people with the surname include:

- Ian Sarson (born 1963), British businessman
- Jeanne Sarson, Canadian human rights activist
- Trish Sarson (born 1946), British/American computer scientist, consultant, and information technology writer

== See also ==
- Mustard seed
