= Chertsey railway station =

Railway station in Surrey, England

Coordinates: 51°23′13″N 0°30′36″W

Chertsey
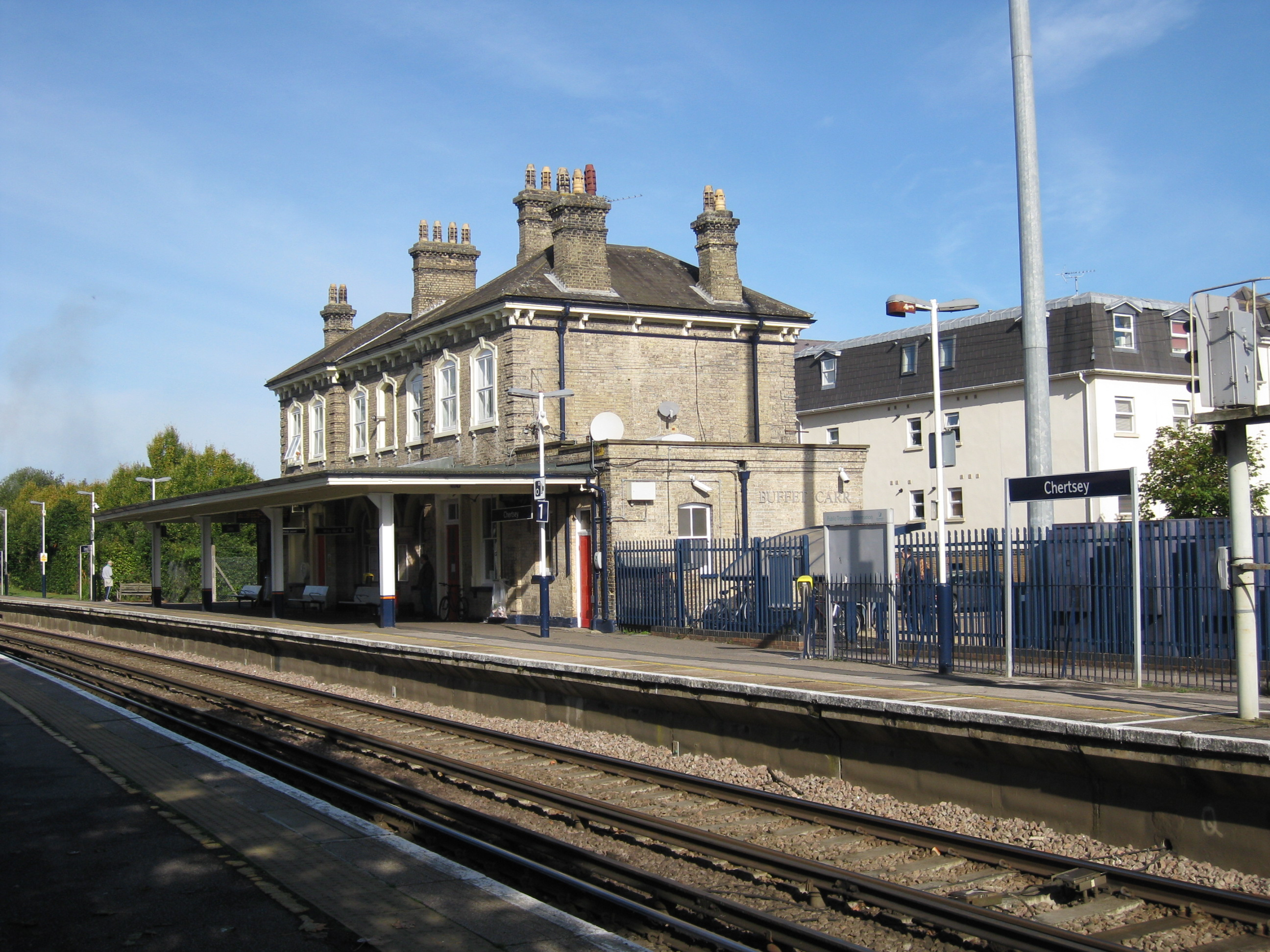

General information
- Location: Chertsey, Runnymede; England
- Grid reference: TQ037664
- Manager: South Western Railway
- Platforms: 2

Other information
- Station code: CHY
- Classification: DfT category D

Key dates
- 14 February 1848: Opened
- 1 October 1866: Resited on the opposite side of the road

Passengers
- 2020/21: ▼0.222 million
- 2021/22: ▲0.497 million
- 2022/23: ▲0.551 million
- 2023/24: ▲0.609 million
- 2024/25: ▲0.638 million
Location
Notes
- Passenger statistics from the Office of Rail and Road

Chertsey railway station serves the town of Chertsey in the Runnymede District of Surrey, England. It is on the Chertsey Loop Line and is operated by South Western Railway.

== History ==
The first station was opened by the London and South Western Railway, with the initial section of the Chertsey branch line, in 1848. The existing building, now a Grade II listed building, was opened on 1 October 1866. It comprises Up and Down platforms having brick buildings: the main building being on the Down side. There is a level crossing here. The platforms can hold ten carriage trains.

Local mythology ascribes the design of the existing station building to William Tite but, in fact, he had stopped all architectural work about 13 years previously. Historic England says, on this subject, "design thought to have been derived from earlier prototypes by Sir William Tite for L.S.W.R." citing, as its source, the book Victorian Stations: Railway Stations in England and Wales, 1836-1923 by Gordon Biddle 1973.

== Original Station ==
Whereas the current station is about 40m to the north west of Guildford Street, the original 1848 station was on the other side of Guildford Street to the south east. At the time it opened and for 18 years thereafter, the line terminated at Guildford Street and the branch line ran only in a south easterly direction to Weybridge railway station. It was only with opening of the current station in 1866 that the line was completed north westwards to Virginia Water railway station in order to allow travel onward to Egham railway station and Reading railway station. The original station building was on the north eastern side of the tracks.

Plans showing the layout of both stations are available for viewing, by prior arrangement, in the research section of Chertsey Museum. An 1848 plan shows the original station at the time it was built. Plans from 1870 to 1880 show the current station with new buildings springing up around it but still using the sidings, goods warehouse and engine house on the other side of Guildford Street left over from the original station.

== Services ==
All services at Chertsey are operated by South Western Railway.

The typical off-peak service in trains per hour is:

- 2 tph to London Waterloo via Hounslow
- 2 tph to Weybridge

On Sundays, the service is reduced to hourly in each direction and southbound trains run to and from Woking instead of Weybridge.

Preceding station	National Rail	Following station
Virginia Water	South Western Railway Chertsey Branch Line	Addlestone
