= Christopher P. Gane =

British-American computer scientist (1938-)

Christopher P. (Chris) Gane (September 6, 1938 – November 25, 2019) was a British/American computer scientist, consultant and information technology writer, known for developing data flow diagrams with Trish Sarson in the 1970s.

== Life and work ==
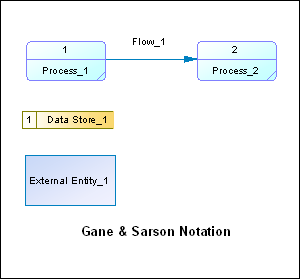
Gane-Sarson Notation for data flow diagrams.

Born in England, Gane obtained his MA in Physics at the University of Cambridge, and started working as computer scientist at IBM in London. In 1973 he emigrated to the United States, where he started as independent IT consultant in New York.

In 1975 he joined Ed Yourdon's software company. In 1977 with Trish Sarson he founded Improved Systems Technologies (IST). In 1977 they published their best known work Structured Systems Analysis: Tools and Techniques, in which they presented a specific type of data flow diagrams.

Beside his work Structured Analysis, Gane published works on rapid application development (1989) and computer-aided software engineering (1990).

== Selected publications ==
- Lewis, Brian N., Ivan S. Horabin, and Chris Gane. Flow charts, logical trees and algorithms for rules and regulations. No. 2. HM Stationery Office, 1967.
- Gane, Chris, and Trish Sarson. Structured Systems Analysis and Design. New York: Improved Systems Technologies (1977).
- Gane, Chris P., and Trish Sarson. Structured systems analysis: tools and techniques. Prentice Hall Professional Technical Reference, 1979.
- Gane, Chris. Computer-aided software engineering: the methodologies, the products, the future. Prentice-Hall, Inc., 1990.
- Gane, Chris. Rapid System Development. (1989).
