= Ian Sarson =

British businessman (b.1963)

- Born: March 15, 1963 (age 63)
- Education: Manchester Metropolitan University
- Occupations: Businessman, entrepreneur
- Years active: 1963 - present
- Children: 2

Ian James Sarson (born 15 March 1963) is a British businessman who was the former managing director of Compass Group UK & Ireland.

== Education ==
Sarson went to Crewe County Grammar School, two years below Mark Price the managing director of Waitrose, from 1974 to 1979. From 1979 to 1981 he did an OND in Hotel and Catering Management at South Cheshire College in Crewe.

He studied Hotel and Catering at Hollings College (now the Hollings Campus of Manchester Metropolitan University, off the A6010) in Manchester from 1981 to 1984. He completed a MSc in Coaching and Mentoring in March 2020.

== Career ==
Sarson started working at the French company Sodexo, a main competitor of Compass Group. He joined Compass in 2004. Compass Group was based next to Chertsey railway station, off the A317 road. He became managing director of the UK arm in April 2010. He was replaced in this role by Dennis Hogan.

He subsequently became Compass's director for healthcare in Europe and Japan and managing director for Northern Europe. Compass Group is the world's leading foodservice company. He left Compass Group in April 2017 and Established Empower U Coaching.

He was awarded an honorary doctorate by Sheffield Hallam University in 2011 and was made an Honorary Doctor of Letters (DLitt)by the University of West London in 2014.

He became chairman of The Sheffield Business School Advisory Board and a Trustee of the Benevolent Charity Hospitality Action.

== Personal life ==
He is married with two daughters. He lives in the Basingstoke and Deane district of Hampshire.

Business positions
Preceded by	Group Managing Director of Compass Group UK & Ireland; April 2010 -	Succeeded by Dennis Hogan
