= Trish Sarson =

British/American computer scientist

- Born: 1946 (age 79–80); England
- Education: Royal Holloway, University of London
- Occupation: Computer scientist
- Known for: Developed data flow diagrams

Trish Sarson (born 1946) is a British/American computer scientist, consultant and information technology writer, known for developing data flow diagrams with Chris Gane in the 1970s.

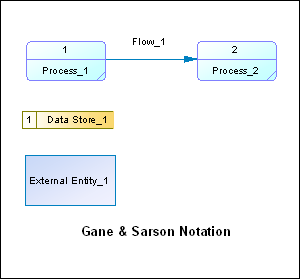
Gane-Sarson Notation for data flow diagrams.

Born in England, Sarson obtained her BA in Zoology and Chemistry at the Royal Holloway, University of London in the 1960s. She emigrated to the United States in 1975, where she joined Ed Yourdon's software company. In 1977 with Chris Gane she founded Improved Systems Technologies (IST), which became a relatively large and successful company. In 1977 they published their best known work Structured Systems Analysis: Tools and Techniques, in which they presented a specific type of data flow diagrams.

== Selected publications ==
- Gane, Chris, and Trish Sarson. Structured Systems Analysis and Design. New York: Improved Systems Technologies (1977).
- Gane, Chris P., and Trish Sarson. Structured systems analysis: tools and techniques. Prentice Hall Professional Technical Reference, 1979.
- Yourdon, E., Lister, T. R., Gane, C., & Sarson, T. (1979). Learning to program in structured COBOL. Prentice Hall Professional Technical Reference.
- Gane, Chris, and Trish Sarson. Structured Systems Analysis. Improved System Technologies. (1984).
