= South Western Railway =

British state-owned train operating company

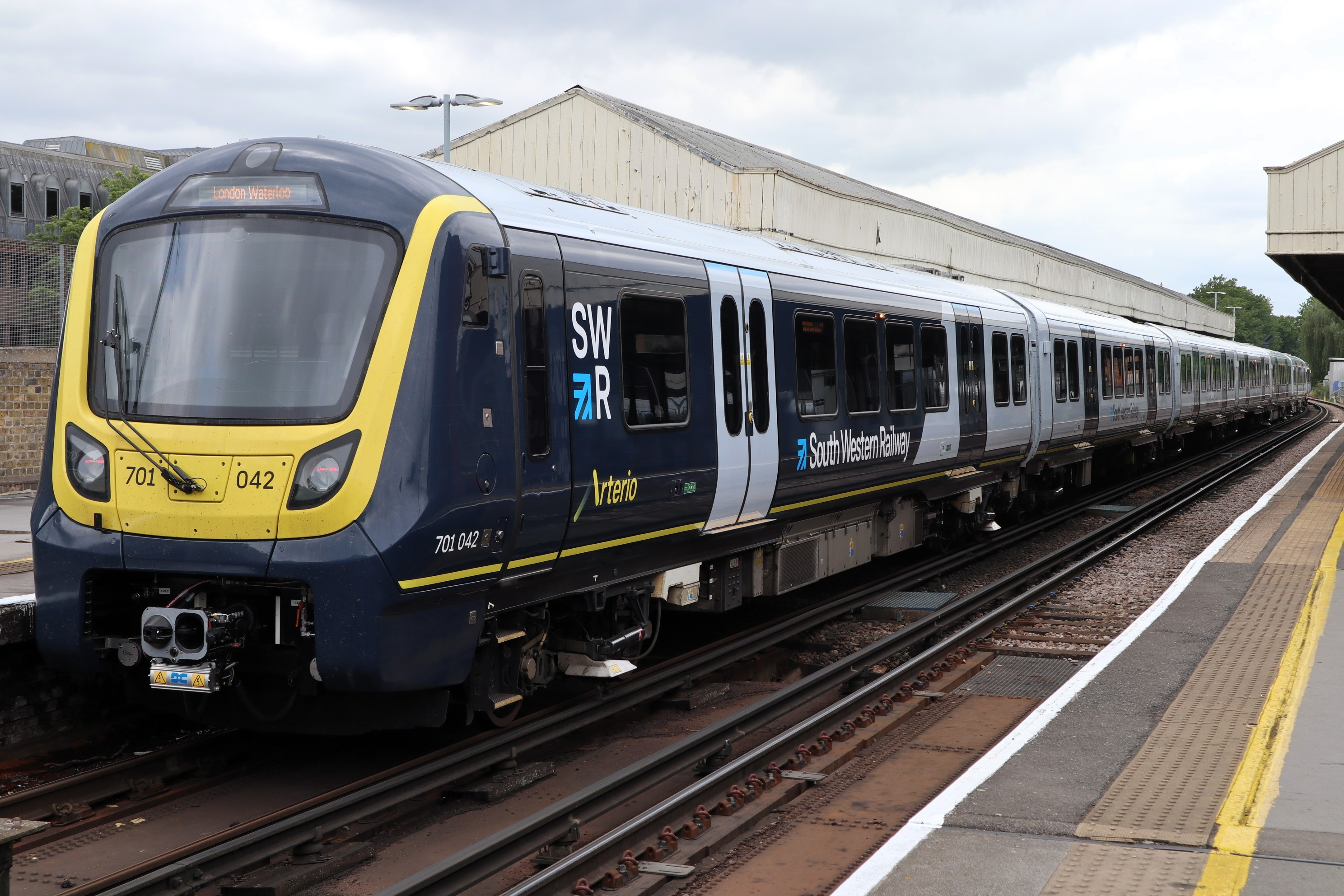
- A South Western Railway Class 701 at Kingston

Overview
- Main regions: Greater London; South East England; South West England
- Fleet: Class 158 Express Sprinter; Class 159 South Western Turbo; Class 444 Desiro; Class 450 Desiro; Class 458 Coradia Juniper; Class 484 D-Train; Class 701 Arterio
- Parent company: DfT Operator
- Headquarters: London
- Reporting mark: SW
- Predecessor: South Western Railway (First MTR)

Other
- Website: www.southwesternrailway.com

South Western Railway Limited, trading as South Western Railway (SWR) and GBR South Western, is a state-owned British train operating company that operates commuter services from its Central London terminus at London Waterloo to south west London, suburban services in the counties of Surrey, Hampshire, Berkshire and Dorset, as well as regional services in Devon, Somerset and Wiltshire. Under the Island Line brand, it operates services on the Isle of Wight.

SWR took over the services from the franchise operator of the same name owned by FirstGroup and MTR Corporation on 25 May 2025.

== History ==
In the lead up to the 2024 United Kingdom general election, the Labour Party of Keir Starmer committed itself to bring the passenger operations of the British rail network back under state ownership. Following its election win, the Labour government introduced the Passenger Railway Services (Public Ownership) Act 2024, which received royal assent in November 2024.

In December 2024, it was announced that the South Western Railway National Rail Contract operated by FirstGroup and MTR Corporation would not be renewed when it expired. Consequently, DfT Operator took over operation of the services on 25 May 2025.

== Services ==
South Western Railway is the main operator for western Surrey, Hampshire, Dorset and the Isle of Wight, and also serves Greater London, Berkshire, Wiltshire, Somerset and Devon.

Most SWR services run on electrified lines using the 750 V DC third rail system. There is a diesel fleet for services on the West of England line to Salisbury and Exeter, using the unelectrified track beyond Worting Junction just west of Basingstoke, and for services from Salisbury to Southampton via Romsey which also serve Eastleigh.

From London Waterloo, SWR's London terminus, long-distance trains run to southern England, including the major coastal population centres of Portsmouth, Southampton, Bournemouth, Poole and Weymouth. There are also trains to Reading and Exeter, but these are not the principal fast services from London to those cities, which are operated from London Paddington by Great Western Railway. The majority of SWR's passengers are on suburban commuter lines in inner and south-west London, Surrey, east Berkshire, and north-east Hampshire.

As with most rail companies, non-folding bicycles are banned from peak-time trains to and from London. However, these restrictions apply only to cyclists boarding or alighting in the area bounded by Hook, Alton, Guildford, Reading and Dorking, in order to maximise available passenger space on the most crowded trains.

=== Mainline services ===
SWR operates regular services on four mainline routes:

- The South West Main Line (SWML) runs between London Waterloo and the town of Weymouth; the route passes through several large towns and cities, including Woking, Basingstoke, Winchester, Southampton, Bournemouth, Poole and Dorchester. South Western Railway operates trains along the entire length of the line. Almost all trains operated by the company start from or terminate at Waterloo with the exception of a Winchester – Bournemouth / Poole stopping service; these include semi-fast services to/from Southampton and Poole, and express services to/from Weymouth. There are also trains to and from Portsmouth, which branch off the SWML at Eastleigh, then proceed via the Eastleigh to Fareham and West Coastway lines to Portsmouth Harbour station.
- The Portsmouth Direct line branches off the SWML at Woking and runs to Portsmouth via Guildford, Haslemere, Petersfield and Havant. South Western Railway operates all passenger trains on this route; these include fast and semi-fast services between London and Portsmouth, and semi-fast services as far as Haslemere.
- The West of England line is the only mainline route that is not fully electrified. It leaves the SWML at Basingstoke and runs to Exeter via Andover, Salisbury, Gillingham and Yeovil. South Western Railway is the only operator on the line, with most services running between London and either Salisbury or Exeter St Davids. Some peak-time services terminate at various other destinations on the line, including Gillingham and Yeovil Pen Mill.
- The Alton line leaves the SWML at Brookwood (just after Woking) and runs to Alton via Aldershot and Farnham. It is the shortest of the four mainline routes and as such it is sometimes considered an outer suburban route instead (but for ticketing purposes, it is classed as a mainline route). Services usually run the full length of the line between London and Alton, though some terminate at Farnham.

In total, as of 2021, there were 14 mainline trains per hour departing London Waterloo in the off-peak hours; this number increases in the peak hours. The majority of mainline services are operated by Class 444 or Class 450 EMUs, except for the West of England Main Line which is operated by Class 158 or Class 159 DMUs (because it is unelectrified), and the Alton Line which also sees the occasional use of Class 458 units.

=== Metro and suburban services ===
South Western Railway also operates many suburban "Metro" services in and around London. These run between Waterloo and Clapham Junction, where they split into two routes: via Putney and via Wimbledon. All services on the suburban part of the network are operated by Classes 450, 458 and 701.

==== Via Putney ====
The main route via Putney is known as the Waterloo to Reading Line. It runs between London and Reading and passes through towns such as Staines-upon-Thames, Ascot and Bracknell. It operates as a fast service as far as Staines, with Reading trains only calling at Clapham Junction, Richmond, Twickenham and Feltham. Branch lines on this route include:

- The Hounslow Loop Line, which leaves the main line at Barnes, runs via Brentford and rejoins the line between Whitton and Feltham (with junctions in both directions). Most services on the branch run either between London and Weybridge (described below), or run in a loop from Waterloo to Waterloo via Brentford, Whitton and Richmond (both clockwise and anticlockwise).
- The Kingston Loop Line, which branches off at Twickenham, runs via Kingston and joins the South West Main Line at New Malden. Most services on this line run in an anticlockwise loop, from Waterloo to Waterloo, via Putney, Strawberry Hill, Kingston and Wimbledon.
  - There is also a branch line to Shepperton, however, this is only served by Putney trains at peak times.
- The Staines to Windsor Line, which branches off the main line at Staines-upon-Thames and runs to Windsor & Eton Riverside station. Most services run semi-fast between London and Windsor.
- The Chertsey Branch Line, which leaves the main line at Virginia Water and runs to Weybridge. Most services on the line run between London and Weybridge via the Hounslow Loop Line; a few services are extended beyond Weybridge, to and from Woking.
- The Ascot to Guildford Line, which is only served by through trains at peak times; these services run between London and Aldershot.

A total of 12 trains per hour run between London Waterloo and Putney in the off-peak hours, as of 2021; this number increases in peak hours.

==== Via Wimbledon ====
The main route via Wimbledon uses the slow tracks of the quadruple-track South West Main Line. Suburban trains run along the mainline between London and Woking. Branch lines on this route include:

- The Mole Valley Line, which branches off the main line at Raynes Park and runs via Epsom to Leatherhead, where it splits into two lines: one to Guildford, and one to Horsham via Dorking. SWR runs regular services to both Guildford and Dorking; the section between Dorking and Horsham is operated by Southern.
  - The Chessington Branch Line leaves the Mole Valley Line at Motspur Park and runs to Chessington.
- The Kingston Loop Line, which leaves the SWML at New Malden, runs via Kingston and joins the Waterloo to Reading line at Twickenham. Most services on this line run in a clockwise loop, from Waterloo to Waterloo, via Wimbledon, Kingston, Strawberry Hill and Putney.
  - The Shepperton Branch Line, which branches off the Kingston Loop Line at Teddington. Most services on the branch line run between Waterloo and Shepperton via Wimbledon.
- The Hampton Court Branch Line, which leaves the main line at Surbiton and runs directly to Hampton Court.
- The New Guildford Line, which also branches off at Surbiton, running to Guildford via Claygate. The line joins the Guildford branch of the Mole Valley Line at Effingham Junction.

A total of 16 trains per hour run between London Waterloo and Wimbledon in the off-peak hours, as of 2021; this number increases in peak hours.

=== Other services ===
Routes that do not start or terminate at London Waterloo include:

- The Ascot to Guildford Line, which runs between Ascot and Guildford via Aldershot. Most services on the line run only between Ascot and Guildford, with no extension in either direction; however, some peak-time services run between London and Farnham via Ascot. The shuttle services are usually operated by Class 450 units.
- The western section of the West Coastway Line between Portsmouth and Southampton. Class 450 units are usually in operation on this route.
- The Eastleigh–Romsey line between Romsey and Eastleigh. Services on the line are extended beyond Eastleigh to and from Salisbury via Southampton Central and Romsey, in effect calling at Romsey twice. These services are operated by Class 158 units.
- The Wessex Main Line between Salisbury and Southampton. Services are extended beyond Southampton via the Eastleigh to Romsey Line, as described above.
- The Lymington Branch Line between Brockenhurst and Lymington Pier runs every 30 minutes between these two stations. These services are operated by a single Class 450 unit.
- The Island Line on the Isle of Wight, between Ryde Pier Head and Shanklin. These services are operated by Class 484 units, converted from London Underground D78 Stock.

=== Service table ===
As of May 2026, SWR routes off-peak Monday to Friday, with frequencies in trains per hour (tph), include:

Mainline services
Route	tph	Calling at
London Waterloo to Weymouth	1	Woking; Winchester; Southampton Airport Parkway; Southampton Central; Brockenhurst; Bournemouth; Branksome; Parkstone; Poole; Hamworthy; Wareham; Dorchester South
London Waterloo to Weymouth	1	Clapham Junction (Note: Passengers may only board services from London. Passengers may both board and alight services to Waterloo.); Basingstoke; Winchester; Southampton Airport Parkway; Southampton Central; Brockenhurst; New Milton; Christchurch; Pokesdown; Bournemouth; Poole; Hamworthy; Holton Heath; Wareham; Wool; Moreton; Dorchester South; Upwey; This route splits/merges at Bournemouth with the route to Poole, see below.
London Waterloo to Poole	1	Clapham Junction; Basingstoke; Winchester; Southampton Airport Parkway; Southampton Central; Brockenhurst; New Milton; Christchurch; Pokesdown; Bournemouth; Branksome; Parkstone; This route splits/merges at Bournemouth with the route to Weymouth, see above.
London Waterloo to Portsmouth Harbour	1	Woking; Farnborough (Main); Fleet; Basingstoke; Micheldever; Winchester; Eastleigh; Hedge End; Botley; Fareham; Portchester; Cosham; Hilsea; Fratton; Portsmouth & Southsea
London Waterloo to Portsmouth Harbour	1	Woking; Guildford; Godalming; Haslemere; Petersfield; Havant; Fratton; Portsmouth & Southsea
London Waterloo to Portsmouth Harbour	1	Woking; Guildford; Farncombe; Godalming; Haslemere; Liphook; Liss; Petersfield; Rowlands Castle; Havant; Bedhampton; Hilsea; Fratton; Portsmouth & Southsea
London Waterloo to Haslemere	1	Clapham Junction; Woking; Worplesdon; Guildford; Farncombe; Godalming; Milford; Witley
London Waterloo to Exeter St Davids	1	Clapham Junction; Woking; Basingstoke; Andover; Salisbury; Tisbury; Gillingham; Templecombe; Sherborne; Yeovil Junction; Crewkerne; Axminster; Honiton; Feniton (1 tp2h); Whimple (1 tp2h); Cranbrook; Pinhoe; Exeter Central; Feniton and Whimple are served by alternating trains.
London Waterloo to Salisbury	1	Woking; Basingstoke; Overton; Whitchurch; Andover; Grateley; 2 trains extend to Yeovil Junction, calling at; Warminster, Westbury, Frome, Bruton, Castle Cary, and Yeovil Pen Mill.
London Waterloo to Basingstoke	2	Clapham Junction (1 tph); Surbiton; Walton-on-Thames; Weybridge; Woking; Brookwood; Farnborough (Main); Fleet; Winchfield; Hook
London Waterloo to Alton	2	Clapham Junction; Surbiton; West Byfleet; Woking; Brookwood; Ash Vale; Aldershot; Farnham; Bentley (1 tph)
Winchester to Southampton Central	1	Shawford; Eastleigh; Southampton Airport Parkway; northbound service runs through Southampton from Bournemouth
Southampton Central to Bournemouth	1	Totton; Ashurst New Forest; Beaulieu Road; Brockenhurst; Sway; New Milton; Hinton Admiral; Christchurch; Pokesdown; northbound service runs through Southampton to Winchester
Metro and Suburban services (via Putney)
Route	tph	Calling at
London Waterloo to Reading	2	Vauxhall; Clapham Junction; Richmond; Twickenham; Feltham; Staines; Egham; Virginia Water; Longcross; Sunningdale; Ascot; Martins Heron; Bracknell; Wokingham; Winnersh; Winnersh Triangle; Earley
London Waterloo to Windsor & Eton Riverside	2	Vauxhall; Clapham Junction; Putney; Richmond; Twickenham; Whitton; Feltham; Ashford; Staines; Wraysbury; Sunnymeads; Datchet
London Waterloo to Weybridge	2	Vauxhall; Queenstown Road; Clapham Junction; Wandsworth Town; Putney; Barnes; Barnes Bridge; Chiswick; Kew Bridge; Brentford; Syon Lane; Isleworth; Hounslow; Feltham; Ashford; Staines; Egham; Virginia Water; Chertsey; Addlestone
London Waterloo to London Waterloo via Hounslow	2	Vauxhall, Queenstown Road, Clapham Junction, Wandsworth Town, Putney, Barnes, Barnes Bridge, Chiswick, Kew Bridge, Brentford, Syon Lane, Isleworth, Hounslow, Whitton, Twickenham, St Margarets, North Sheen, Mortlake... Line loops back towards Waterloo back through Barnes
London Waterloo to London Waterloo via Kingston (anticlockwise)	2	Vauxhall; Queenstown Road; Clapham Junction; Wandsworth Town; Putney; Barnes; Mortlake; North Sheen; Richmond; St Margarets; Twickenham; Strawberry Hill; Teddington; Hampton Wick; Kingston...; Services continue to London Waterloo via Wimbledon (see below)
Metro and Suburban services (via Wimbledon)
Route	tph	Calling at
London Waterloo to London Waterloo via Kingston (clockwise)	2	Vauxhall; Clapham Junction; Earlsfield; Wimbledon; Raynes Park; New Malden; Norbiton; Kingston...; Services continue to London Waterloo via Putney (see above)
London Waterloo to Shepperton	2	Vauxhall; Clapham Junction; Wimbledon; Raynes Park; New Malden; Norbiton; Kingston; Hampton Wick; Teddington; Fulwell; Hampton; Kempton Park; Sunbury; Upper Halliford
London Waterloo to Hampton Court	2	Vauxhall; Clapham Junction; Earlsfield; Wimbledon; Raynes Park; New Malden; Berrylands; Surbiton; Thames Ditton
London Waterloo to Woking	2	Vauxhall; Clapham Junction; Earlsfield; Wimbledon; Surbiton; Esher; Hersham; Walton-on-Thames; Weybridge; Byfleet & New Haw; West Byfleet
London Waterloo to Guildford	2	Vauxhall; Clapham Junction; Earlsfield; Wimbledon; Surbiton; Hinchley Wood; Claygate; Oxshott; Cobham & Stoke d'Abernon; Effingham Junction; Horsley; Clandon; London Road (Guildford)
London Waterloo to Guildford	1	Vauxhall; Clapham Junction; Earlsfield; Wimbledon; Raynes Park; Motspur Park; Worcester Park; Stoneleigh; Ewell West; Epsom; Ashtead; Leatherhead; Bookham; Effingham Junction; Horsley; Clandon; London Road (Guildford)
London Waterloo to Dorking	1	Vauxhall; Clapham Junction; Earlsfield; Wimbledon; Raynes Park; Motspur Park; Worcester Park; Stoneleigh; Ewell West; Epsom; Ashtead; Leatherhead; Box Hill & Westhumble
London Waterloo to Chessington South	2	Vauxhall; Clapham Junction; Earlsfield; Wimbledon; Raynes Park; Motspur Park; Malden Manor; Tolworth; Chessington North
Other services
Route	tph	Calling at
Ascot to Aldershot	2	Bagshot; Camberley; Frimley; Ash Vale
Guildford to Farnham	2	Wanborough; Ash; Aldershot
Southampton Central to Portsmouth & Southsea	1	St Denys; Bitterne; Woolston; Sholing; Netley; Hamble; Bursledon; Swanwick; Fareham; Portchester; Cosham; Hilsea; Fratton
Romsey to Salisbury	1	Chandler's Ford; Eastleigh; Southampton Airport Parkway; Swaythling; St Denys; Southampton Central; Millbrook; Redbridge; Romsey; Mottisfont & Dunbridge; Dean
Brockenhurst to Lymington Pier	2	Lymington Town
Island Line
Route	tph	Calling at
Shanklin to Ryde Pier Head	3/2	Lake; Sandown; Brading; Ryde St John's Road; Ryde Esplanade; Services also call at Smallbrook Junction when the Isle of Wight Steam Railway is running services.

== Rolling stock ==
South Western Railway Limited inherited a fleet of Classes 158, 159, 444, 450, 455, 458 and 701 from FirstMTR South Western Railway. The Class 455 was retired in March 2026.

=== Current fleet ===
Family	Class	Image	Type	Top speed		Number	Carriages	Routes	Built
Family	Class	Image	Type	mph	km/h	Number	Carriages	Routes	Built
South Western Railway
Sprinter	158 Express Sprinter		DMU	90	145	8	2	London Waterloo – Exeter St Davids; Romsey – Salisbury via Southampton Central	1989–1992
Sprinter	159 South Western Turbo		DMU	90	145	29	3	West of England, Heart of Wessex and Wessex Main Lines: London Waterloo – Exeter St Davids	159/0: 1992–1993; 159/1: converted 2006–2007
Siemens Desiro	444		EMU	100	160	45	5	London Waterloo – Weymouth and Poole; London Waterloo – Portsmouth Harbour via Guildford or Basingstoke (shared with Class 450s)	2003–2004
Siemens Desiro	450		EMU	100	160	127	4	London Waterloo – Portsmouth Harbour, Alton or Basingstoke.; Southampton Central – Portsmouth & Southsea; Brockenhurst – Lymington Pier; Winchester – Bournemouth; Outer suburban routes: London Waterloo – Windsor & Eton Riverside, Weybridge via Staines; London Waterloo via Hounslow; Ascot – Guildford; Some express and inner suburban services	2002–2006
Alstom Coradia Juniper	458/4		EMU	100	160	28	4	Outer suburban services: London Waterloo – Weybridge, Teddington or Windsor & Eton Riverside, Inner suburban services (Occasionally)	2013–2016; (1998–2002 as 458/0); (2000–2001 as 460)
Bombardier Aventra	701/0 Arterio		EMU	100	160	60	10	Reading, Windsor and south west London suburban services	2019–2024
Bombardier Aventra	701/5 Arterio		EMU	100	160	30	5	Reading, Windsor and south west London suburban services	2019–2024
Island Line
Vivarail D-Train	484		EMU	60	100	5	2	Island Line: Ryde Pier Head – Shanklin	1978–1981 (as D78 Stock); Converted 2020–2021

=== Past fleet ===
Most of the Class 455 fleet was withdrawn at the end of December 2025, following the influx of the Class 701 Arterio sets. The last service operated using the class was on 20 March 2026. Between 2025 and 2026 the Class 458/5 fleet was withdrawn, the fleet was replaced by the Class 701 Arterio.

Family	Class	Image	Type	Top speed		Number	Carriages	Routes	Built	Left fleet
Family	Class	Image	Type	mph	km/h	Number	Carriages	Routes	Built	Left fleet
South Western Railway
BR Second Generation (Mark 3)	455		EMU	75	120	30	4	Inner suburban routes: London Waterloo – Shepperton, Hampton Court, Woking; London Waterloo via Hounslow or Strawberry Hill; London Waterloo – Dorking, Guildford via Cobham & Stoke D'Abernon or Epsom, Chessington South, or Windsor & Eton Riverside	1982–1985	2026
Alstom Coradia Juniper	458/5		EMU	75	120	8	5	Outer suburban services: London Waterloo – Weybridge, Teddington or Windsor & Eton Riverside, Inner suburban services (Occasionally)	(2000–2001 as 460)	2026

== Depots ==
The following train depots and stabling sidings are used for the South Western Railway fleet:

- Bournemouth Depot is southwest of Bournemouth station, occupying the approach to the former Bournemouth West.
- Farnham Traincare Depot, in Weydon Lane west of Farnham, was opened by the Southern Railway at the time of the electrification of the Portsmouth and Alton lines in 1937.
- Feltham Depot was completed in 2021; it is intended to provide stabling for the Class 701 units.
- Fratton Traincare Depot is located on central Portsea Island, alongside Fratton station.
- Northam Traincare Facility was built by Siemens in 2002 as the home depot for the Desiro fleet as part of a 20-year maintenance contract. It is located south of St Denys station and is near Southampton Football Club's St Mary's Stadium.
- Ryde Traincare Depot, alongside Ryde St John's Road on the Isle of Wight services the Class 484 units that operate on the Island Line.
- Salisbury Depot maintains the Class 158 and Class 159 fleet.
- Strawberry Hill Train Maintenance Depot in south west London, was built in 1897, is inside the triangular junction of the Shepperton Branch Line with the Kingston Loop Line, just yards from Strawberry Hill railway station.
- Wimbledon Traincare Depot is located between Wimbledon and Earlsfield stations, on the main line to Waterloo, next to the Wimbledon railway viaduct.

Preceded by South Western Railway (2017–2025)	Operator of South Western franchise 2025–present	Succeeded by Incumbent
