= Chertsey branch line =

Railway line in southern England

Coordinates: 51.3931°N 0.5324°W

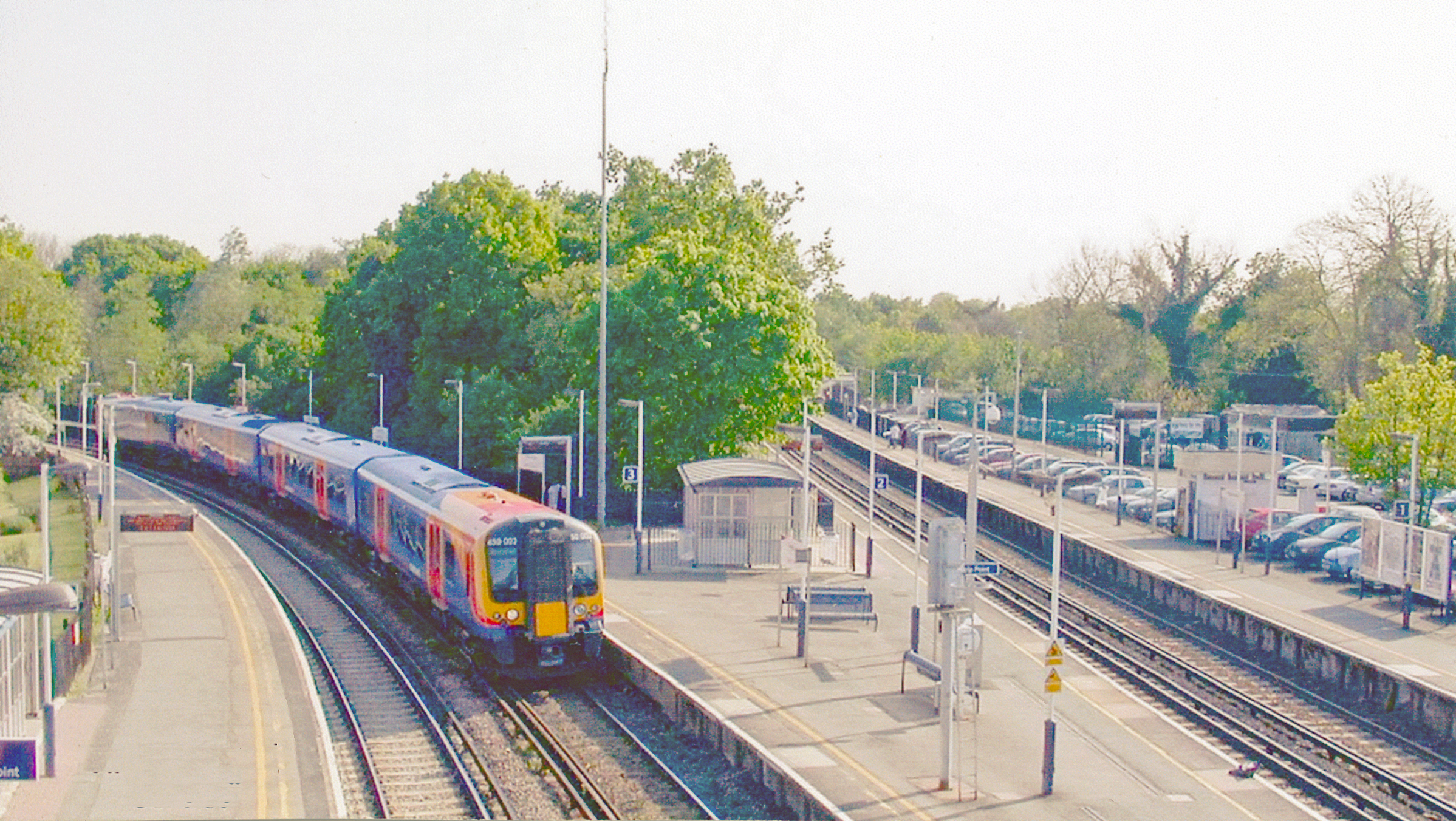
- South West Trains Class 450 in the Chertsey branch line platforms at Virginia Water

Overview
- Other name: Chertsey loop line
- Status: Operational
- Owner: Network Rail
- Locale: Surrey, South East England
- Stations: 4

Service
- Type: Suburban rail, Heavy rail
- System: National Rail
- Operator: South Western Railway
- Rolling stock: Class 450; Class 458; Class 701

History
- Opened: 1849

Technical
- Line length: 5 miles 40 chains (8.9 km)
- Num of tracks: 2
- Track gauge: 1,435 mm (4 ft 8 1/2 in) standard gauge
- Electrification: Third rail, 750 V DC
- Operating speed: 70 mph (110 km/h)

The Chertsey branch line (also known as the Chertsey loop line) is a 5-mile-40-chain (8.9 km) railway line in Surrey, England. It runs from the Waterloo–Reading line at Virginia Water station to a triangular junction with the South West Main Line near Weybridge. There are intermediate stations at Chertsey and Addlestone. All of the stations are managed by South Western Railway, which operates all passenger trains. Most services run between Weybridge and London Waterloo via Hounslow and Clapham Junction. For much of the day, passengers can change to faster services at Virginia Water or Weybridge to reach central London more quickly.

The line was built in two main stages by the London and South Western Railway. The Weybridge-Chertsey section opened in February 1848 and the extension to Virginia Water opened in October 1866. The line was electrified using the 750 V DC third-rail system by the Southern Railway in 1937.

== Infrastructure and services ==
The Chertsey branch line is a railway line in Surrey, England. It runs for 5 miles 40 ch (8.9 km) from Weybridge to an at-grade junction with the Waterloo–Reading line, immediately to the east of Virginia Water station. (Note: The curve through Virginia Water station has a radius of 10 ch (660 ft; 200 m) and a 15 mph (24 km/h) speed restriction.) At Weybridge, there is a triangular junction with the South West Main Line. (Note: The triangular junction at Weybridge allows trains from the Chertsey branch to access the South West Main Line in both directions. The southwest-facing Byfleet Junction is grade separated, but the northwest-facing Addlestone Junction and the east-facing junction at Weybridge station are at-grade.) The maximum speed permitted on the branch is 70 mph (110 km/h). The line is electrified using the 750 V DC third-rail system and is double tracked throughout. Signalling is controlled by Basingstoke rail operating centre and Woking signal box; Track Circuit Block is in operation. There are two level crossings on the line, immediately to the south of each of Chertsey and Addlestone stations.

The stations on the branch are managed by South Western Railway, which operates all services. Chertsey and Addlestone stations have two platforms, Virginia Water has four platforms (two are on the branch) and Weybridge has three platforms. (Note: Platform 1 at Addlestone station is the shortest on the line with a length of 176.5 m (579 ft).) The off-peak service pattern is two trains per hour in each direction calling at all stations between Weybridge and London Waterloo via Hounslow. Trains from Weybridge typically reach Virginia Water in around 21 minutes, Staines in around 30 minutes and London Waterloo in one hour and twenty five minutes. Passengers from Chertsey and Addlestone may be able to reach their destinations more quickly, by changing to faster services to London at either Weybridge or Virginia Water.

Stations on the Chertsey branch line (ordered from north to south)
Station	Distance from Waterloo	Number of platforms	Opening date	Ref.
Virginia Water	23 mi 15 ch (37.3 km) via Richmond	4 (2 on branch)	9 July 1856	
Chertsey	22 mi 25 ch (35.9 km) via Wimbledon	2	14 February 1848	
Addlestone	20 mi 71 ch (33.6 km) via Wimbledon	2	14 February 1848	
Weybridge	19 mi 12 ch (30.8 km) via Wimbledon	3	21 May 1838	

== History ==
=== Authorisation, initial opening and extension ===
London and South Western Railway (Chertsey and Egham Branch) Act 1846
- Act of Parliament
- Parliament of the United Kingdom
- Long title: An Act to enable the London and South-western Railway Company to make a Branch Railway to Chertsey and Egham in the County of Surrey.
- Citation: 9 & 10 Vict. c. clxxiv

Dates
- Royal assent: 16 July 1846

The first company to obtain parliamentary approval for a line to Chertsey was the Windsor, Staines and South Western Railway (WSSWR). On 16 July 1846, it was granted permission in the London and South Western Railway (Chertsey and Egham Branch) Act 1846 (9 & 10 Vict. c. clxxiv) to build a railway from the South West Main Line at Weybridge, through Chertsey to a station on the south side of the River Thames at Egham. Since the company was focused on building its line from Staines to Windsor, the Windsor, Staines, and South-western Railway Act (No. 2) 1847 (10 & 11 Vict. c. lvii) was obtained on 25 June 1847 to allow the London and South Western Railway (LSWR) to build the Weybridge-Chertsey section. The WSSWR did not build the northern part of the line and its powers to do so lapsed.

The development of the Chertsey branch line

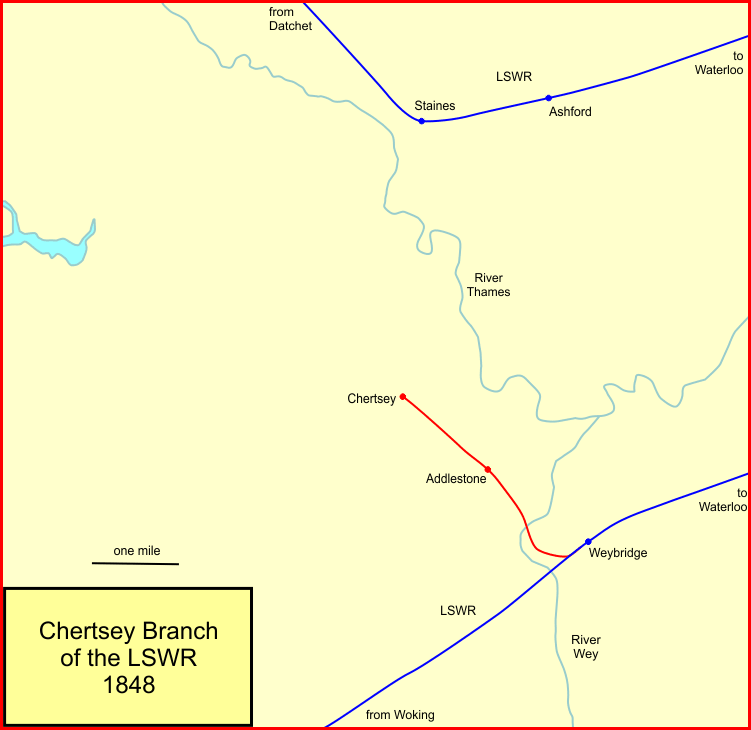
1848

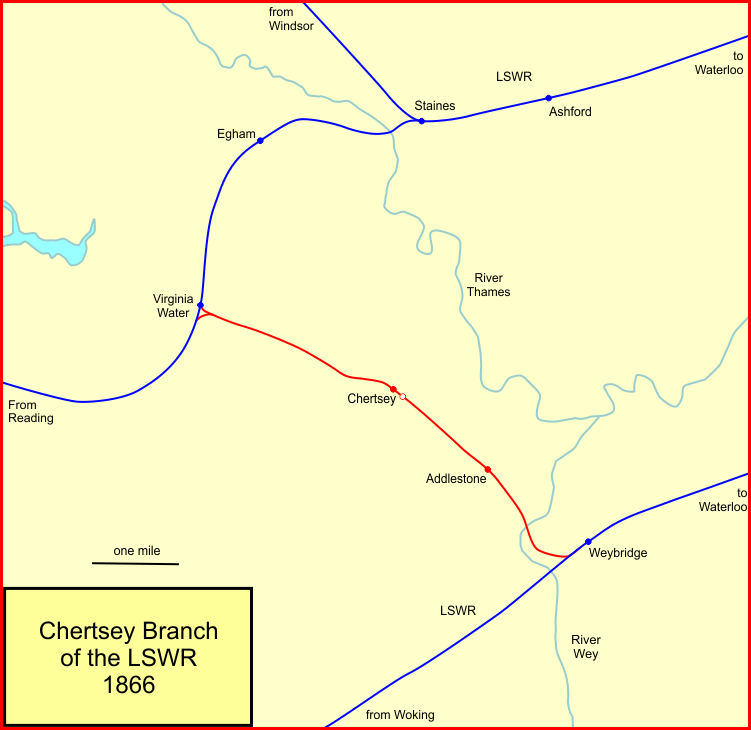
1866

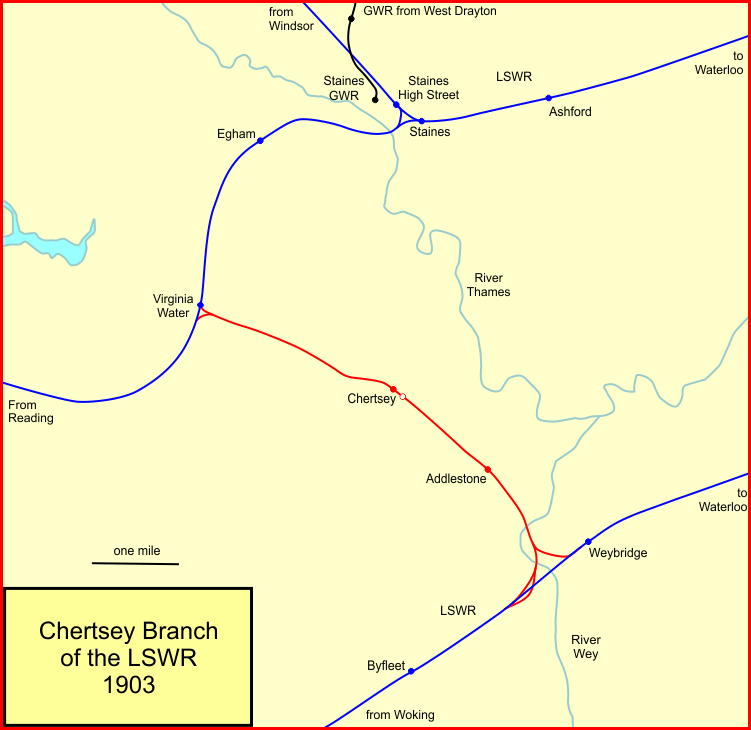
1903

The Weybridge-Chertsey section opened on 14 February 1848 with an intermediate station at Addlestone. An east-facing junction was provided at Weybridge. From 1 June 1863, the branch was served once daily by a slip coach, detached from the 19:00 Waterloo-Portsmouth service. By 1876, there were two daily trains detaching slip carriages for the line. All LSWR slip coach operations ceased on 2 June 1902 and additional through trains from the branch to Waterloo were provided thereafter.

South-western (Chertsey Extension) Railway Act 1864
- Act of Parliament
- Parliament of the United Kingdom
- Long title: An Act for authorizing the London and South-western Railway Company to make and maintain a Railway from the London and South-western Railway at Chertsey to the Staines and Wokingham Railway at Egham; and for other Purposes.
- Citation: 27 & 28 Vict. c. lxxxvii

Dates
- Royal assent: 23 June 1864

Text of statute as originally enacted

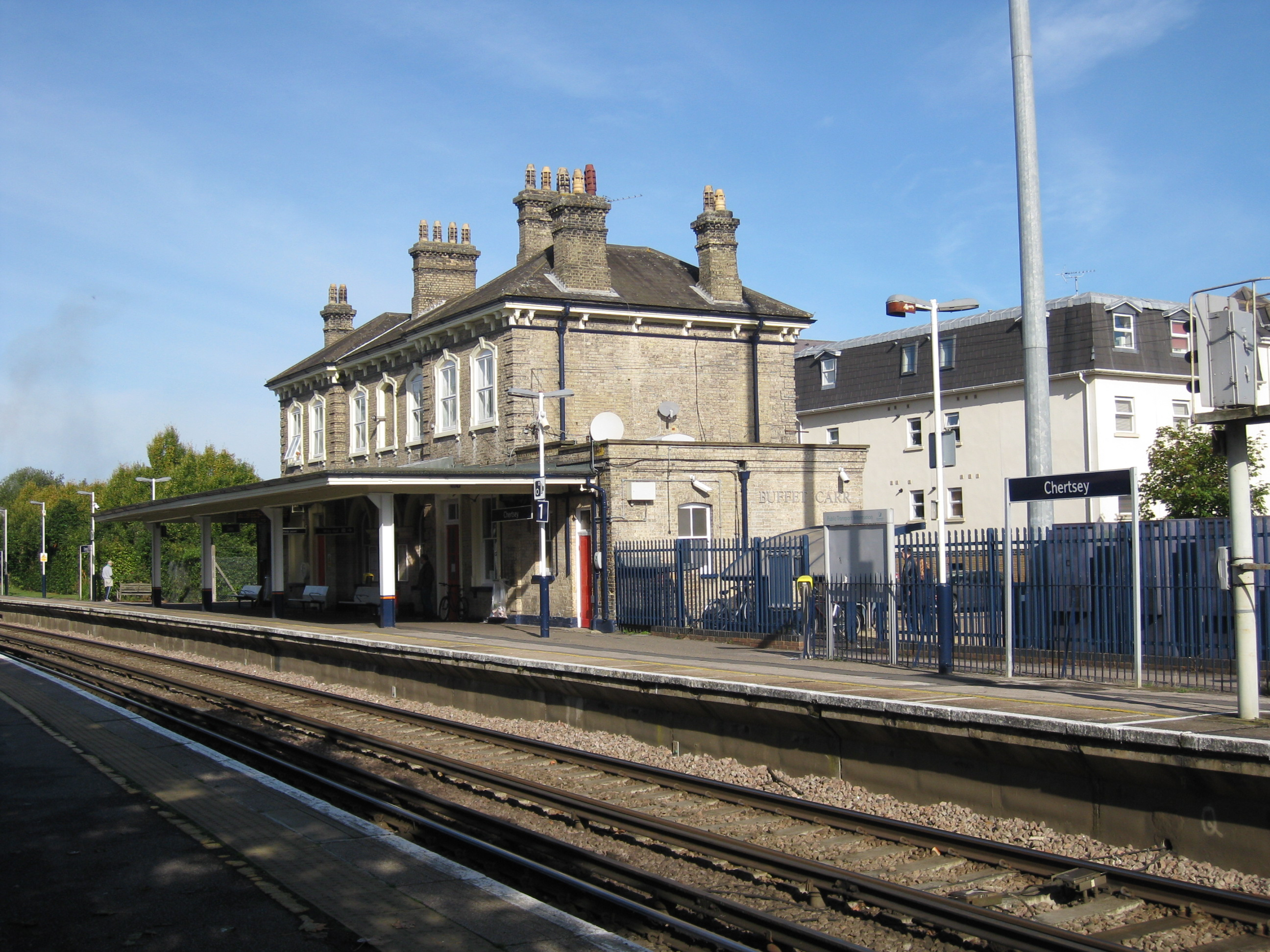
The Grade II-listed Chertsey station was relocated to its current site on 1 October 1866

The South-western (Chertsey Extension) Railway Act 1864 (27 & 28 Vict. c. lxxxvii) authorised the LSWR to extend the line northwestwards to Virginia Water, where it would meet the Staines-Wokingham line. (Note: The line from Staines to Ascot via Virginia Water had opened on 4 June 1856.) The plan to construct the new section was motivated, in part, by the company's opposition to rival schemes to connect the Staines-Windsor line with Woking. The 2.5 mi (4.0 km) extension opened on 1 October 1866. A new station was provided for Chertsey on the north side of Guildford Road; the site of the previous station became the goods yard. A triangular junction was provided at Virginia Water; the single-track west curve, generally only used for raceday traffic to Ascot, was doubled in December 1898.

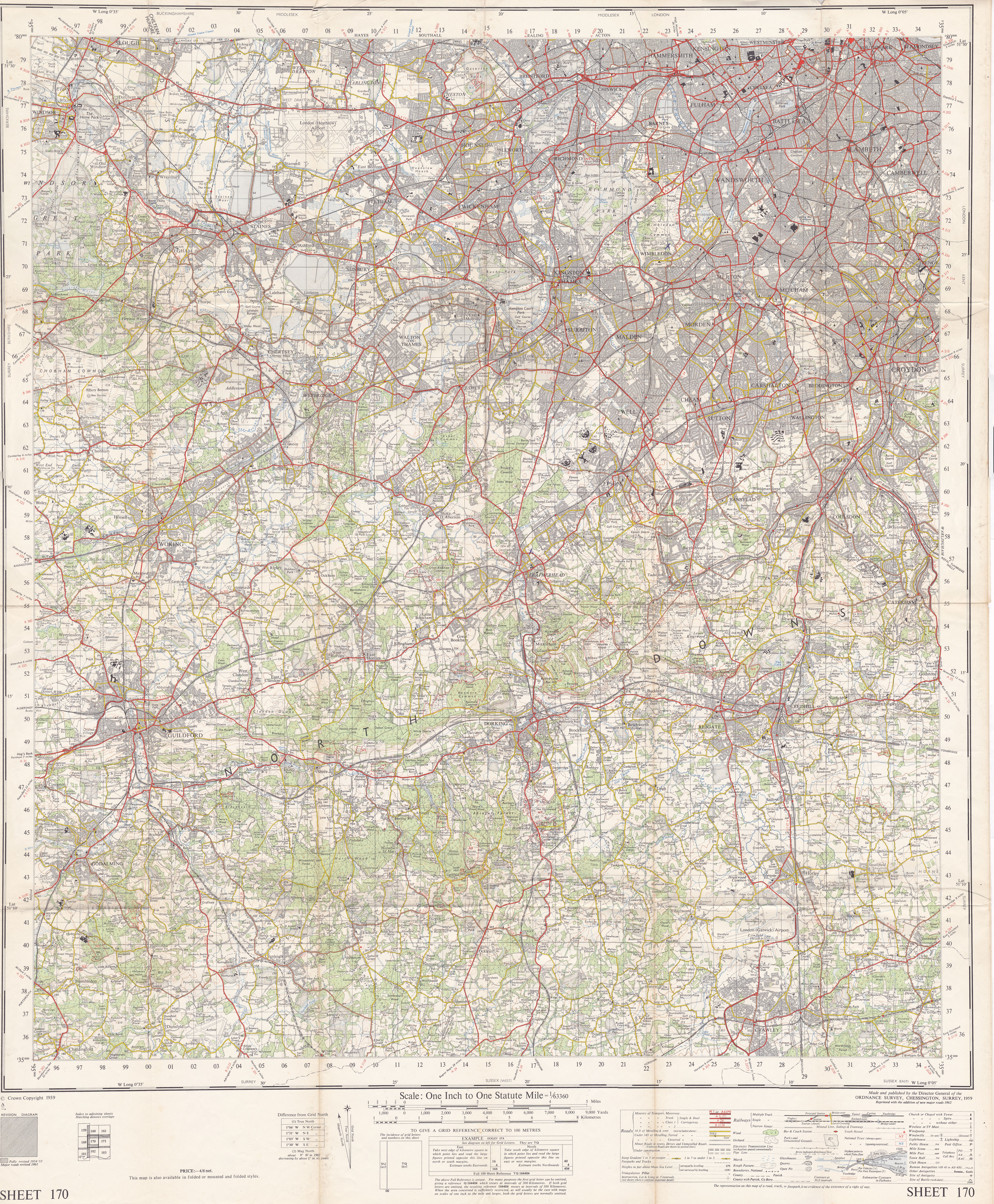
The triangular junction between the Chertsey branch line and the South West Main Line in 1959: The line towards Chertsey is at the top and Weybridge station is the red circle on the right.

A 68 ch (1.4 km) north-west curve at the south end of the line was authorised on 20 August 1883. The new link formed the third part of the triangular junction to the west of Weybridge. It opened on 10 August 1885, enabling direct running from the branch to Woking without the need for reversal, although it does not appear to have been used regularly until 4 July 1887. The South West Main Line was double track when the link was built but, in 1902, the formation was widened to four tracks. At the same time, Byfleet Junction, at the southwestern end of the triangle, was modified by routing the down connection beneath the main lines. The new grade-separated junction was commissioned on 19 February 1903.

A new passenger service between Windsor and Woking was operated over the new curve between 1 May 1889 and 30 January 1916. The link was used again in the summers of 1937, 1938 and 1939, when Alton to Woking shuttle services continued onto the Chertsey branch to reverse clear of the main line. A half-hourly Staines to Woking via Chertsey service was introduced in May 1986, but was withdrawn six years later.

=== Later history ===
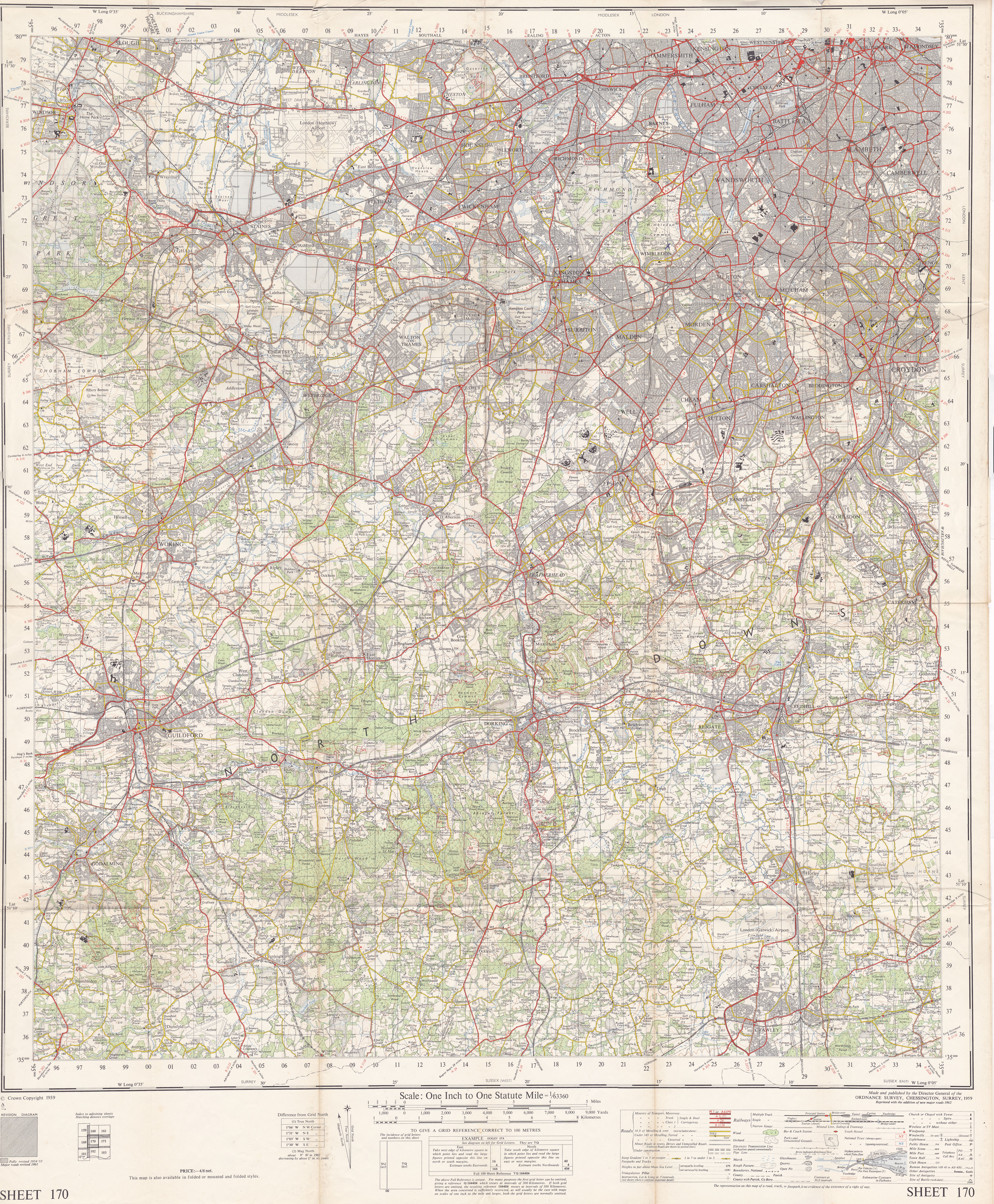
The triangular junction between the Chertsey branch line and the Waterloo-Reading line in 1959: The line towards Chertsey is on the right and Virginia Water station is the red circle.

The Chertsey branch was electrified using the third-rail system in the mid-1930s under the Portsmouth No 1 Electrification project. Electric trains began running on the line for staff training on 30 November 1936 and public services started on 3 January the following year. (Note: Until the 1930s, the lines on the branch were named so that Chertsey was always approached in the down direction from both north and south. Following electrification, the up/down designation on the southern half of the line was swapped, so that trains leaving Weybridge for Virginia Water ran in the up direction along the entire length of the branch.) Initially 2-NOL electric multiple units worked the line, but were replaced by 4-SUB units in December 1956. The latter had a brief tenure on the line, being replaced by Class 415 units the following May. Class 455 trains were introduced to the branch in 1985. Electrification of the west curve at Virginia Water was commissioned on 1 January 1939, but the spur was taken out of service on 27 July 1964. Since electrification, almost all regular train services have used the bay platform at Weybridge.

The goods yards at Chertsey and Addlestone closed in October 1964 and December 1966, respectively, although two electrified sidings were retained at the former for stabling. Coxes Mill, on the Wey at Coxes Lock, was served by a private siding that had opened c. 1904. The siding acted as a transshipment facility to a narrow gauge railway serving the mill site. It formally closed on 27 May 1980.

Two major resignalling schemes took place on the Chertsey branch line during the early 1970s. Control of the Weybridge to Chertsey section was transferred to Surbiton panel box on 22 March 1970. Control of the remainder of the line was transferred to Feltham area signal box on 8 September 1974. The three signal boxes controlling the triangular junction with the South West Main Line (Weybridge Junction box, Addlestone Junction box and Byfleet Junction box) closed in 1970. Chertsey and Addlestone signal boxes were initially retained to control their adjacent level crossings, but were finally closed in January 1975.

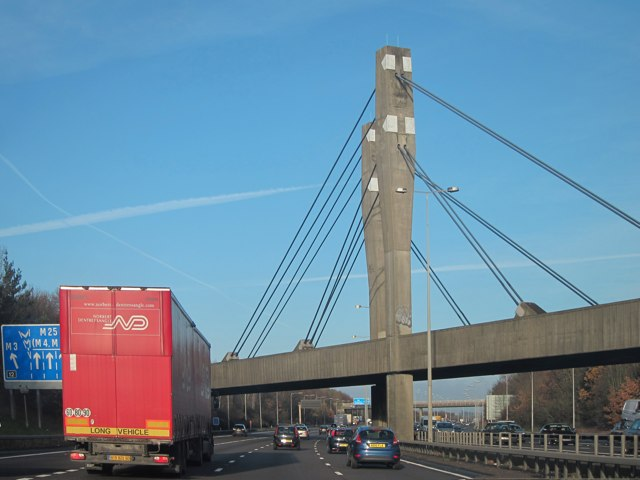
Lyne Railway Bridge over the M25

The former level crossing at Lyne was closed in 1976, when the local road layout was modified for the construction of the M25. A short stretch of the railway was diverted between December 1976 and February 1979 to allow the construction of the Lyne Railway Bridge. The cable-stayed bridge, the first railway bridge of its type in Europe, has two spans of 180 ft (55 m) and cost £1.04M to build. The design chosen was around £0.5M cheaper than conventional alternatives and minimised the disruption to the operational railway.

== Bibliography ==
- Brown, David (2010). Main line electrification, the war years and British Railways. Southern Electric. Vol. 2. Crowthorne: Capital Transport Publishing. ISBN 978-1-85-414340-2.
- Faulkner, J.N.; Williams, R.A. (1988). The LSWR in the twentieth century. Newton Abbot: David & Charles. ISBN 978-0-71-538927-0.
- Hornby, Frank (1995). London Suburban. Peterborough: Silver Link Publishing. ISBN 978-1-85-794039-8.
- Jackson, Alan A. (1999). The railway in Surrey. Penryn: Atlantic Transport Publishers. ISBN 978-0-90-689990-8.
- Quick, Michael (2023) [2001]. Railway Passenger Stations in Great Britain (PDF) (5.05 ed.). London: Railway and Canal Historical Society.
- Mitchell, Vic; Smith, Keith (1986). Waterloo to Woking. Midhurst: Middleton Press. ISBN 978-0-90-652038-3.
- Mitchell, Vic; Smith, Keith (1989). Branch lines around Ascot. Midhurst: Middleton Press. ISBN 978-0-90-652064-2.
- Moody, George T. (1958). Southern Electric. Hampton Court: Ian Allan Publishing. ISBN 978-0-71-100924-0.
- Walther, René; Houriet, Bernard; Isler, Walmar; Moïa, Pierre; Klein, Jean-François (1999). "8: Example of small and medium-span cable-stayed bridges". Cable-stayed bridges (2nd ed.). London: Thomas Telford. ISBN 978-0-72-772773-2.
- Williams, R. A. (1968). The London & South Western Railway. Vol. 1: The Formative Years. Newton Abbot: David & Charles. ISBN 0-7153-4188-X.
- Williams, R. A. (1973). The London & South Western Railway. Vol. 2: Growth and Consolidation. Newton Abbot: David & Charles. ISBN 0-7153-5940-1.
- "Kent / Sussex / Wessex Routes Sectional Appendix" (PDF). Network Rail. 2009.
- "Delivering a better railway for a better Britain | Route Specifications: Wessex" (PDF). Network Rail. 2016.
