= Weybridge railway station =

Railway station in Surrey, England

Weybridge
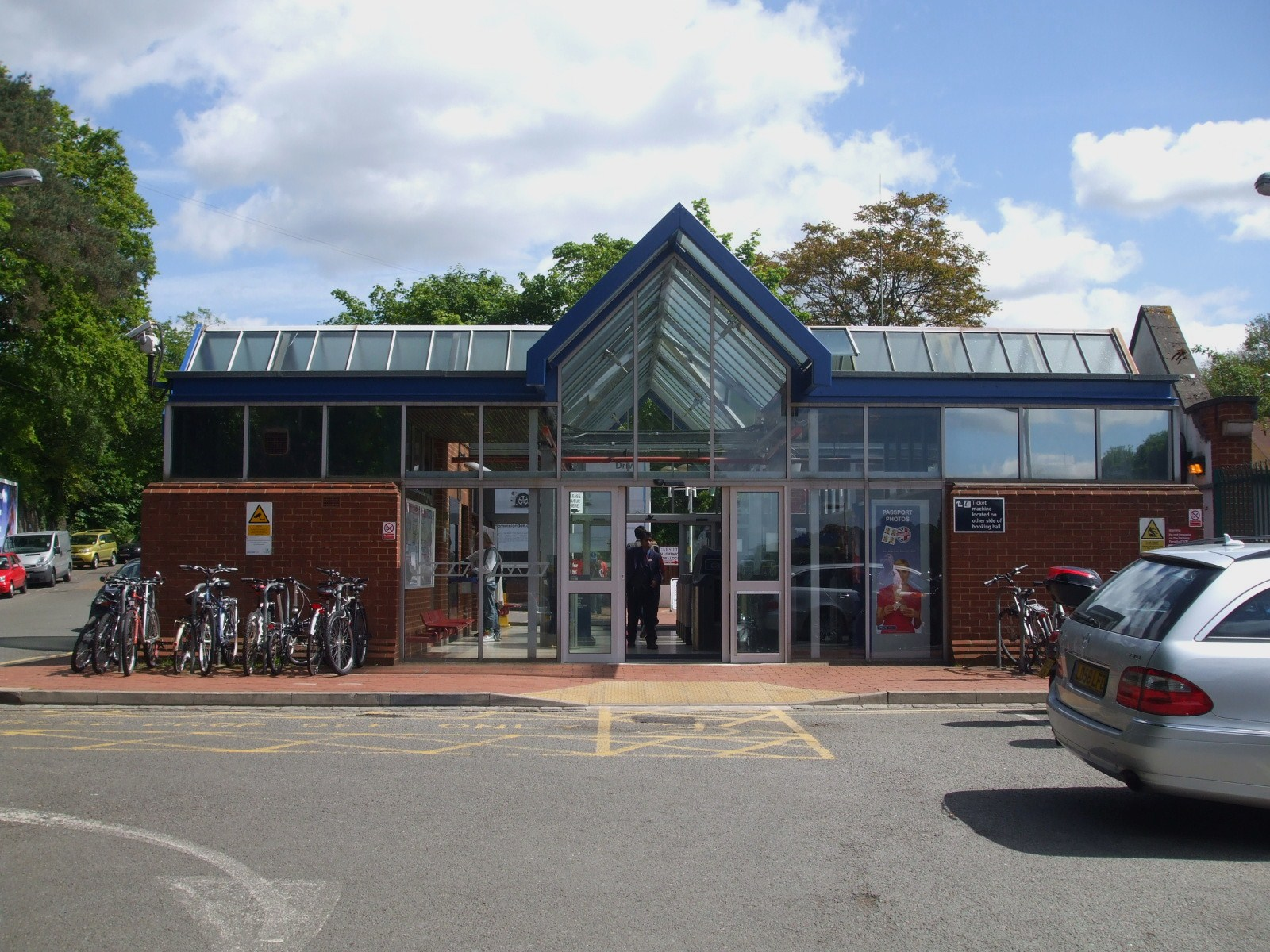

General information
- Location: Weybridge, Elmbridge; England
- Coordinates: 51°21′42″N 0°27′27″W
- Grid reference: TQ074636
- Managed by: South Western Railway
- Platforms: 3
- Tracks: 5

Other information
- Station code: WYB
- Classification: DfT category C2

History
- Opened: 21 May 1838; 187 years ago

Passengers
- 2020/21: ▼0.420 million
- Interchange: ▼0.193 million
- 2021/22: ▲1.234 million
- Interchange: ▲0.420 million
- 2022/23: ▲1.681 million
- Interchange: ▲0.474 million
- 2023/24: ▲1.858 million
- Interchange: ▲0.518 million
- 2024/25: ▲1.988 million
- Interchange: ▲0.592 million
Location
Notes
- Passenger statistics from the Office of Rail and Road

Weybridge railway station is near the established midpoint of Weybridge in Surrey, England and south of its town centre. It is on the South West Main Line and operated by South Western Railway.

It is 19 miles 12 chains (30.8 km) from London Waterloo (Note: Railways in the United Kingdom historically are measured in miles and chains. There are 80 chains to one mile.) and is situated between Walton-on-Thames and Byfleet & New Haw on the main line. The Chertsey branch line diverges from the main line here and runs to Virginia Water.

== History ==
The station was opened by the London and Southampton Railway (L&SR) on 21 May 1838. The L&SR had not intended to construct a station at Weybridge, but was required by the authorizing act of Parliament to build two road bridges over the line near the town. Following a negotiation with the Weybridge vestry, the company agreed to open a station on a trial basis for 12 months in exchange for being allowed to build only one bridge. Two platforms were constructed in the deep cutting between St George's Hill and Weybridge Heath and the main station building, on the north side of the line, was at road level. Initially, the typical journey time to London was around an hour and, by 1841, a mail train was stopping daily.

The branch to Chertsey, which joined the main line via an east-facing junction, was constructed in 1848. It was not until 1885 that Byfleet Junction was constructed, creating the triangle of lines to the west of Weybridge station. Additional tracks on the main line through the station were added in 1885 and 1902. A new station building, equipped with luggage lifts, was built between 1902 and 1904 in conjunction with the quadrupling work, but was destroyed by an arson attack in January 1987.

By 1895, there was a freight yard with a goods shed to the north west of the station. The yard closed in 1964 and by the mid-1980s the area was being used by a coal merchant and for the station car park. The lines through the station were electrified in 1907, although steam locomotives continued to haul long-distance express services through Weybridge until 1967. The 68-lever signal box was closed on 22 March 1970, when control of the lines in the Weybridge area was transferred to Surbiton Panel Box.

The development of the railway lines in the Weybridge area

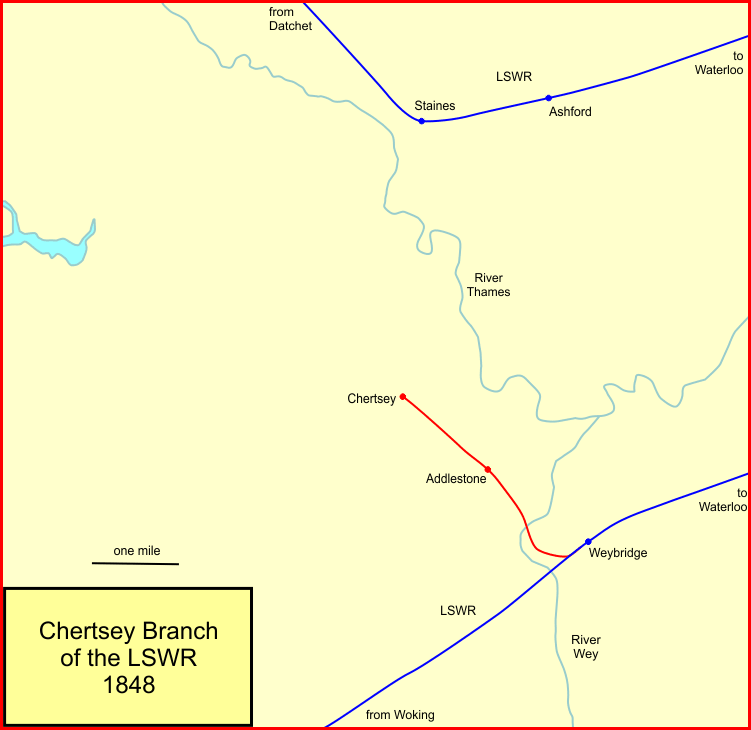
1848

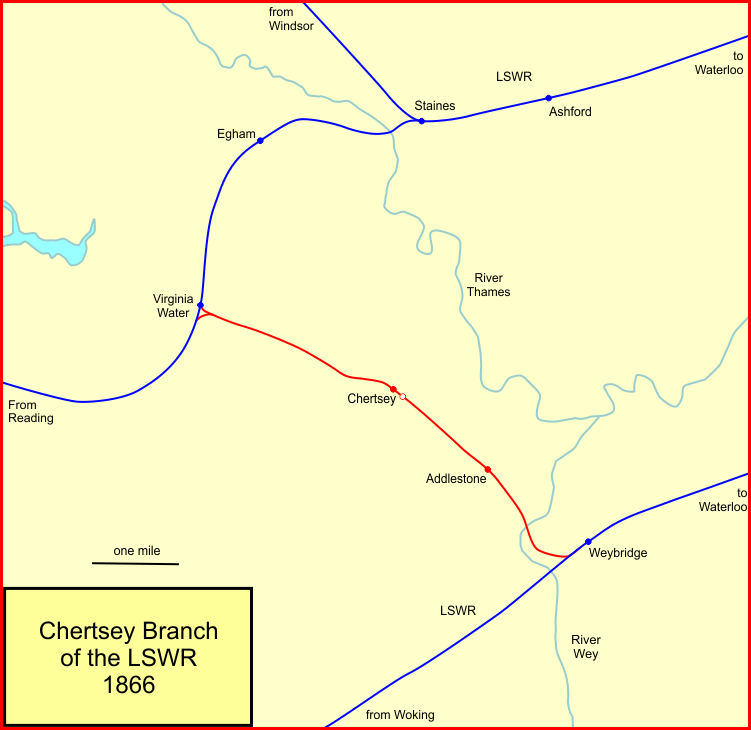
1866

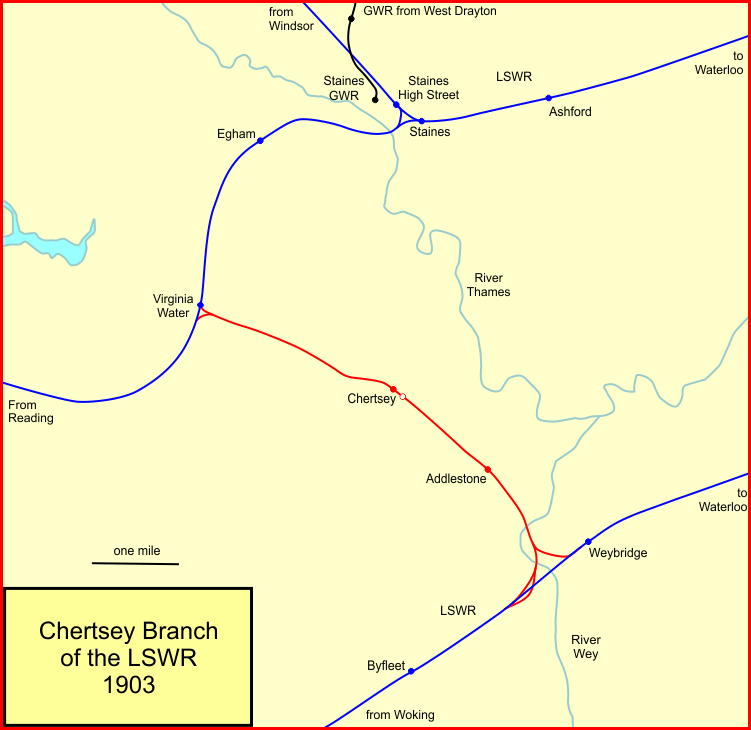
1903

== Service ==
South Western Railway operate northbound services to London Waterloo, via Surbiton or Chertsey, inner suburban southbound services to Woking and outer suburban services to Basingstoke.

The typical off-peak Monday to Friday service is:

Platform 1

- 2tph to London Waterloo via Staines and Hounslow

Platform 2

- 4tph to London Waterloo via Surbiton (2 fast, 2 semi-fast)

Platform 3

- 2tph to Basingstoke via Woking and Farnborough
- 2tph to Woking (2 trains each in the morning/evening rush hour, as well as all services on Sunday, go on to Guildford)

== Amenities and immediate surroundings ==
A pub with large car park, nightclub and Saint George's Hill adjoin the north and east of the station respectively. The business estate, museum of Brooklands and Brooklands College adjoin the other sides. The station is close to the approximate midpoint of the medieval parish boundaries of Weybridge.

Bus routes 436, 515 and the Cobham Chatterbus serve the station.

== In popular culture ==
Scenes of The Dam Busters were filmed at the station, as Wallis had lived nearby.

== Notes ==
Preceding station	National Rail	Following station
Walton-on-Thames	South Western Railway Waterloo to Woking	Byfleet & New Haw
Walton-on-Thames	South Western Railway Waterloo to Basingstoke	Woking
Addlestone	South Western Railway Chertsey Branch Line	Terminus
