= Borough of Runnymede =

Coordinates: 51.395°N 0.541°W

- Borough and non-metropolitan district
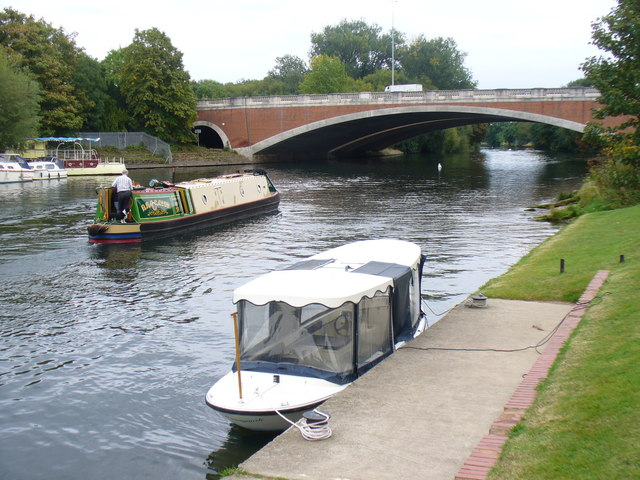
- Runnymede Bridge, carrying the A30 and M25 over the River Thames near Egham

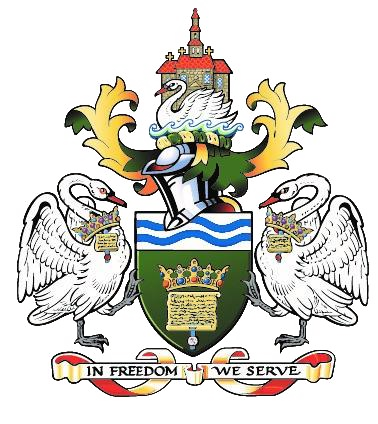
- Coat of arms
- Motto: In Freedom We Serve
- Runnymede shown within Surrey
- Sovereign state: United Kingdom
- Constituent country: England
- Region: South East England
- Non-metropolitan county: Surrey
- Status: Non-metropolitan district
- Admin HQ: Addlestone
- Incorporated: 1 April 1974

Government
  - Type: Non-metropolitan district council
  - Body: Runnymede Borough Council
  - MPs: Ben Spencer; Jack Rankin

Area
  - Total: 30.1 sq mi (78.0 km^{2})
  - Rank: 220th (of 296)

Population (2025)
  - Total: 93,013
  - Rank: 263rd (of 296)
  - Density: 3,090/sq mi (1,190/km^{2})

Ethnicity (2021)
  - Ethnic groups: List: 83.5% White; 9.2% Asian; 3.5% Mixed; 1.9% other; 1.8% Black

Religion (2021)
  - Religion: List: 50.4% Christianity; 34.8% no religion; 6.9% not stated; 2.9% Islam; 2.3% Hinduism; 1.4% Sikhism; 0.5% Buddhism; 0.5% other; 0.3% Judaism
- Time zone: UTC0 (GMT)
  - Summer (DST): UTC+1 (BST)
- ONS code: 43UG (ONS); E07000212 (GSS)
- OS grid reference: TQ0149367283

The Borough of Runnymede is a local government district with borough status in Surrey, England. Its council is based in Addlestone and the borough also includes the towns of Chertsey and Egham. The borough is named after Runnymede, a water meadow on the banks of the River Thames near Egham, which is connected with the sealing of Magna Carta by King John in 1215.

It is a prosperous part of the London commuter belt, having some of the most expensive housing in the United Kingdom outside central London, such as the Wentworth Estate at Virginia Water. The M25 motorway which encircles London runs through the borough, with Addlestone, Chertsey and Egham Hythe being inside the M25. At the 2021 Census, the population of the borough was 87,739. With a GDP per capita of £87,277 it is the sixth wealthiest borough in the UK, and the wealthiest outside of London. The UK Competitiveness Index ranks it as the 8th most economically competitive area in the UK, with only London boroughs ahead.

The neighbouring districts are Spelthorne, Elmbridge, Woking, Surrey Heath and Windsor and Maidenhead.

== History ==
The district was created on 1 April 1974 under the Local Government Act 1972, covering two former districts which were both abolished at the same time:

- Chertsey Urban District (which included Addlestone)
- Egham Urban District (which included Thorpe and Virginia Water)

The new district was named after the water meadow of Runnymede on the banks of the Thames at Egham on the northern edge of the borough, which is connected with the sealing of Magna Carta by King John in 1215 and is the site of several significant monuments.

The district was awarded borough status in 1978, allowing the chair of the council to take the title of mayor.

As part of upcoming structural changes to local government in England, the district will be abolished in April 2027 and the area will become part of the new unitary authority of West Surrey.

== Governance ==
Runnymede Borough Council provides district-level services. County-level services are provided by Surrey County Council. The borough is unparished, so no parish councils exist.

== Transport ==
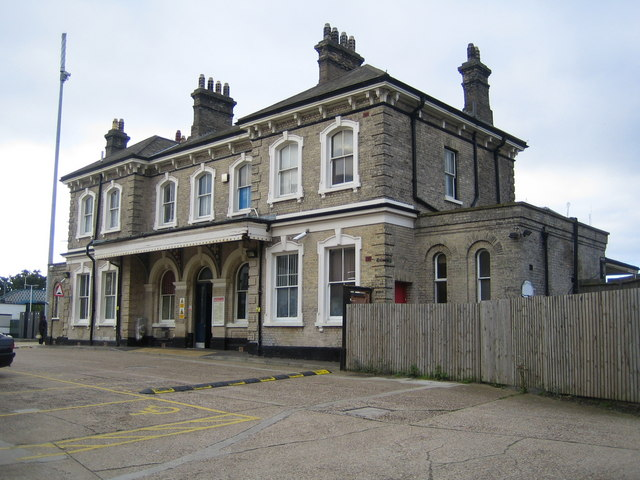
Chertsey railway station

The M25 motorway runs through Runnymede from south to north, with junctions at Chertsey and Egham, while train services in the borough are provided by South Western Railway on the Waterloo–Reading line and the Chertsey branch line.

== Twinning ==
Runnymede is twinned with:

- Bergisch Gladbach, situated 10 miles east of Cologne
- Herndon, Virginia, about 20 miles west of Washington, D.C.
- Joinville-le-Pont, located to the east of Paris.
