= Woking railway station =

Railway station in Surrey, England

Woking
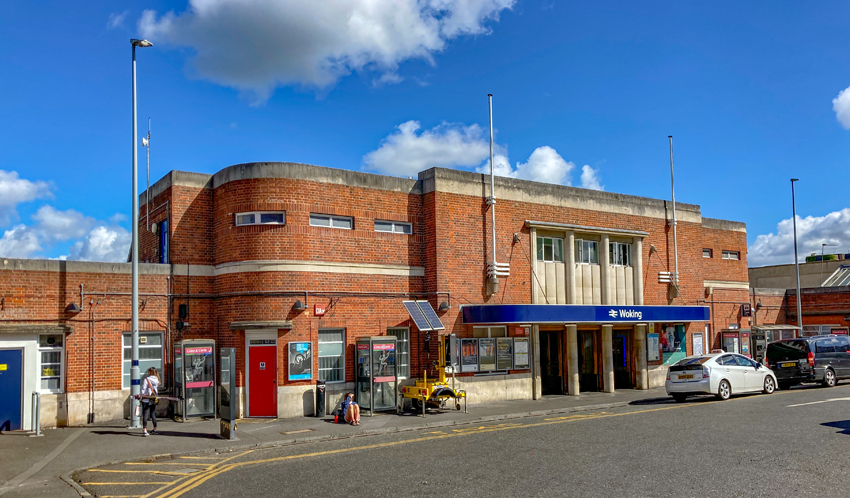
- The station's southern entrance is an Art Deco rounded-edge building in a mixture of concrete and stock brick courses.

General information
- Location: Woking; England
- Coordinates: 51°19′05″N 0°33′25″W
- Grid reference: TQ006587
- Managed by: South Western Railway
- Platforms: 6

Other information
- Station code: WOK
- Classification: DfT category B

History
- Original company: London and Southampton Railway
- Pre-grouping: London and South Western Railway
- Post-grouping: Southern Railway

Key dates
- 21 May 1838: Station opened as Woking Common
- c. 1843: Renamed Woking

Passengers
- 2020/21: ▼1.517 million
- Interchange: ▼0.264 million
- 2021/22: ▲4.070 million
- Interchange: ▲0.725 million
- 2022/23: ▲5.322 million
- Interchange: ▲0.945 million
- 2023/24: ▲6.014 million
- Interchange: ▲1.253 million
- 2024/25: ▲6.522 million
- Interchange: ▲1.363 million
Location
Notes
- Passenger statistics from the Office of Rail and Road

Woking railway station is a principal commuter stop on the South West Main Line, which serves the town of Woking, in Surrey, England. It lies 24 miles 27 chains (39.2 km) down the line from London Waterloo. The station is managed by South Western Railway, which operates all trains serving it. It is the busiest railway station in the county and, as of 2024, the fifth busiest in South East England.

== History ==
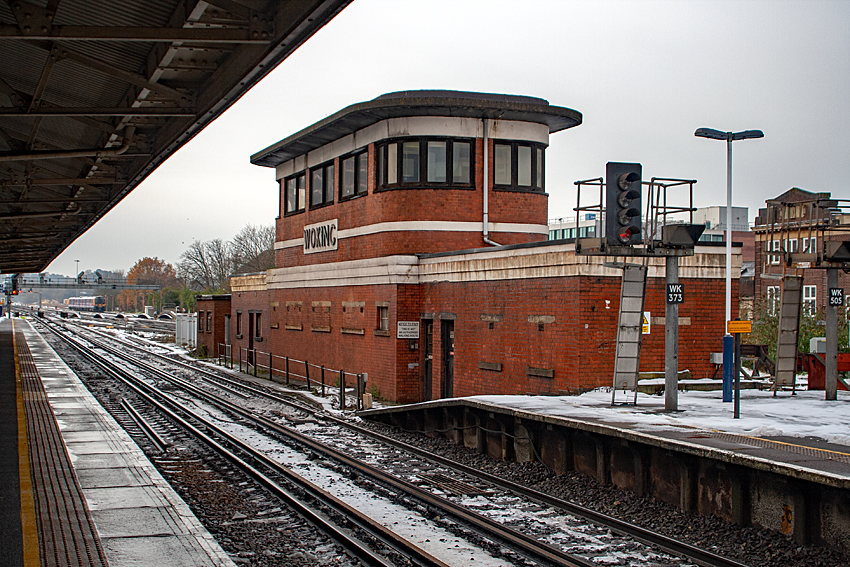
Woking's listed signal box

The London and Southampton Railway (L&SR) was authorised on 25 July 1834 (Note: The L&SR was renamed the London and South Western Railway (LSWR) on 4 June 1839.) and construction began in October of that year. The line was built in stages, and the first section, between the London terminus at Nine Elms and "Woking Common", was opened to passengers on 21 May 1838. (Note: The formal opening of the line took place on 12 May 1838, when the company directors joined the first train from Nine Elms to Woking Common. The 46 mi (74 km) return trip took around 1 hour and 28 minutes.) Woking Common station was built with two platforms linked by a footbridge and a small freight yard was also provided. When it opened, it was surrounded by open heath and was 2 km (1.2 mi) from what is now the village of Old Woking. Nevertheless, it quickly became the railhead for west Surrey and the main entrance was positioned on the south side of the tracks for the convenience of those travelling by stagecoach from Guildford. Construction of Woking town centre, to the north of the station, did not begin until the mid-1860s.

Woking Common became a through station on 24 September 1838, with the opening of the next section of the line as far as Winchfield. The station was given its current name of "Woking" in around 1843. The Guildford Junction Railway (GJR) opened on 5 May 1845, having been authorised less than a year earlier, on 10 May 1844. The GJR was always operated by the LSWR, and was absorbed by that company on 4 August 1845.

The track through Woking station was quadrupled in 1904 and electrified in 1937. The station was rebuilt by the Southern Railway in the Art Deco "Odeon" style in 1936–37. The signal box, which was constructed as part of the rebuilding programme, is a Grade II listed building.

=== Accidents and incidents ===
Three trains were involved in a collision just east of the station on 23 December 1955. A Portsmouth line electric train came to a stand at signals near the Maybury Hill Road bridge. The following steam-hauled Waterloo-Basingstoke train overran the Maybury distant signal and collided with the rear of the electric train, demolishing the guards compartment and deflecting the rear bogie so that it was foul of the up-line. An up Bournemouth steam-hauled train had just left the station and came into sidelong collision with the bogie and came to a stand. Out of around 1000 passengers and crew on the three trains only 21 were injured, including the guard of the electric train, and there were no fatalities.

The Ministry of Transport and Civil Aviation report concluded that the crash was due to human error on the part of the driver of the Basingstoke train. The Basingstoke train locomotive, SR N15X class 32327 Trevithick, was damaged beyond economic repair and scrapped at Eastleigh Works.

== Layout ==
Woking station has six platforms, two of which are bay platforms:

- Platform 1 – Semi-fast London-bound services.
- Platform 2 – Fast London-bound services. Part of a single island with 3 and 4 below.
- Platform 3 – East-facing bay for stopping service to and from London Waterloo. At the end of platforms 2 and 4.
- Platform 4 – Trains to Exeter St Davids, Portsmouth Harbour (via Basingstoke), Salisbury and Weymouth.
- Platform 5 – Portsmouth direct line services, Alton line and Basingstoke stopping services.
- Platform 6 – West-facing bay platform, used by the first train of the day to Portsmouth Harbour via Eastleigh, and often used to stable trains in the event of a train failure.

== Services ==
=== Passenger ===
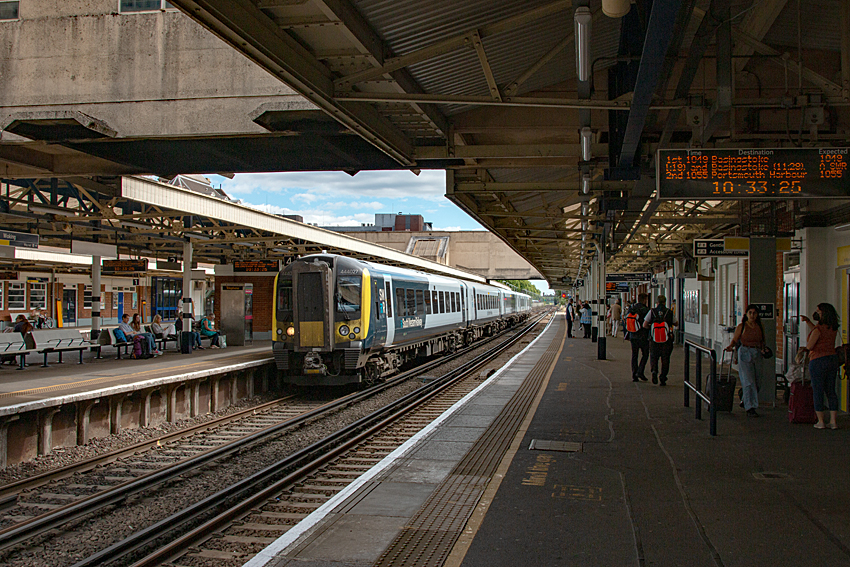
A Class 444 electric multiple unit calling at platform 4

Many South Western Railway services call at Woking, including:

- the Alton Line calling at stations to Alton
- the Portsmouth Direct Line to Guildford and stations to Portsmouth
- the South West Main Line to Winchester, Southampton, Bournemouth, Poole and Weymouth
- the West of England Main Line to Andover, Salisbury and Exeter
- The station is a terminus of the Waterloo to Woking stopping service
  - Two trains in the weekday evening rush hour and all services on Sundays continue to Guildford

Fast trains from Woking take approximately 26 minutes to reach London Waterloo (some stop at Clapham Junction). Trains from the Alton Line take roughly 35 minutes, and the stopping service 50 minutes, to Waterloo.

A half-hourly RailAir bus service runs between the south side of the station and Heathrow Airport, a journey of about 50 minutes.

As of December 2022, the off-peak Monday to Saturday services are as follows:

- 12 trains per hour (tph) to London Waterloo (2 of these are stopping services, 2 of such stop only at Clapham Junction, 4 of which are semi fast and the remaining 4 are non-stop)
- 2 tph to Alton (semi-fast)
- 1 tph to Weymouth via Bournemouth (fast)
- 1 tph to Haslemere via Godalming (stopping)
- 2 tph to Basingstoke (stopping)
- 2 tph to Portsmouth Harbour via Guildford (1 fast, 1 stopping)
- 1 tph to Portsmouth Harbour via Eastleigh (stopping)
- 1 tph to Exeter St Davids via Salisbury

Preceding station	National Rail	Following station
Clapham Junction or London Waterloo	South Western Railway; Portsmouth Direct Line	Guildford
Clapham Junction or London Waterloo	South Western Railway; Portsmouth Direct Line (Stopping service)	Worplesdon
Clapham Junction or London Waterloo	South Western Railway; South West Main Line	Farnborough (Main) or Basingstoke or Winchester
Clapham Junction or London Waterloo	South Western Railway; West of England Main Line	Basingstoke
West Byfleet	South Western Railway; Alton Line	Brookwood
West Byfleet	South Western Railway; Waterloo to Woking (Stopping service)	Terminus
Weybridge	South Western Railway; Waterloo to Basingstoke (Stopping service)	Brookwood
	Historical railways	
Staines	Anglia Railways; London Crosslink	Farnborough (Main)

=== Freight ===
Woking still retains two sets of sidings, each to the west of the station. The down side yard, between the station and Woking junction, is now a Network Rail permanent way maintenance depot and aggregates stone depot operated by Day Aggregates. The up side sidings are used to stable specialist track maintenance machines.

== In popular culture ==
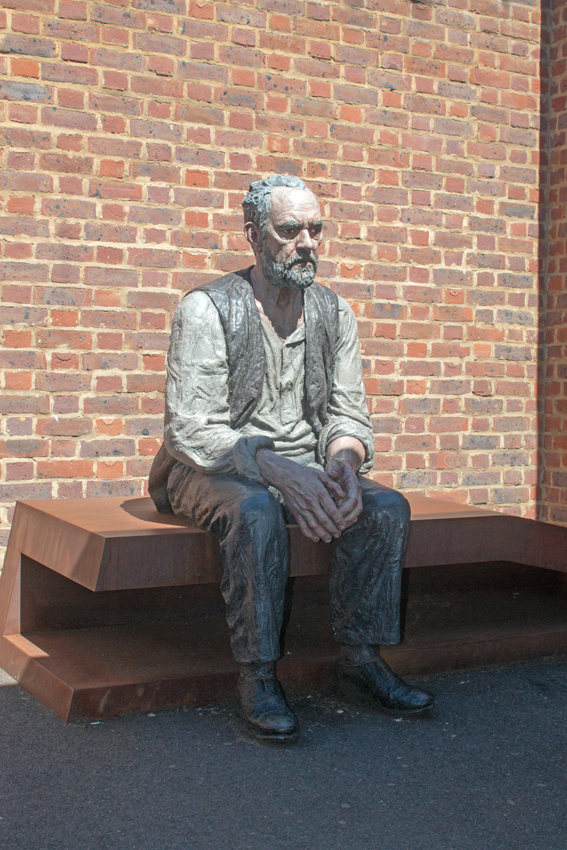
Seated Man by Sean Henry on platform 1

- The station was destroyed in H. G. Wells' The War of the Worlds.
- The station can be seen at the beginning of the 1995 music video for "You Do Something To Me" by Paul Weller.
- In the television adaptation of the Philip K. Dick story "The Commuter" for the series Philip K. Dick's Electric Dreams, railway worker Ed Jacobson (played by Timothy Spall) works at Woking station and discovers a non-existent destination on the Alton line.
- Seated Man, created in 2011 by the artist, Sean Henry, was installed on platform 1 in August 2017.

== Bibliography ==
- Awdry, Christopher (1990). Encyclopaedia of British Railway Companies. London: Guild Publishing. CN 8983.
- Butt, R.V.J. (1995). The Directory of Railway Stations. Yeovil: Patrick Stephens Ltd. ISBN 1-85260-508-1. R508.
- Earnshaw, Alan (1991). Trains in Trouble. Vol. 7. Penryn: Atlantic Books. ISBN 0-906899-50-8.
- Mitchell, Vic; Smith, Keith (1986). Waterloo to Woking. Midhurst: Middleton Press. ISBN 978-0-90-652038-3.
- Mitchell, Vic; Smith, Keith (1988). Woking to Southampton. Midhurst: Middleton Press. ISBN 978-0-90-652055-0.
- Wakeford, Iain (1987). Woking 150 : The history of Woking and its railway. Woking: Mayford & Woking District History Society. ISBN 978-0-95-026751-7.
- Wakeford, Iain (2003). Woking town centre : An illustrated history. Iain Wakeford.
- Wells, H.G. (1975) [1898]. The War of the Worlds. London: Pan Books. ISBN 0-330-24332-2.
- Williams, R.A. (1968). The London & South Western Railway, volume 1: The Formative Years. Newton Abbot: David & Charles. ISBN 0-7153-4188-X.
