= British Rail Class 415 =

British Rail coaching stock

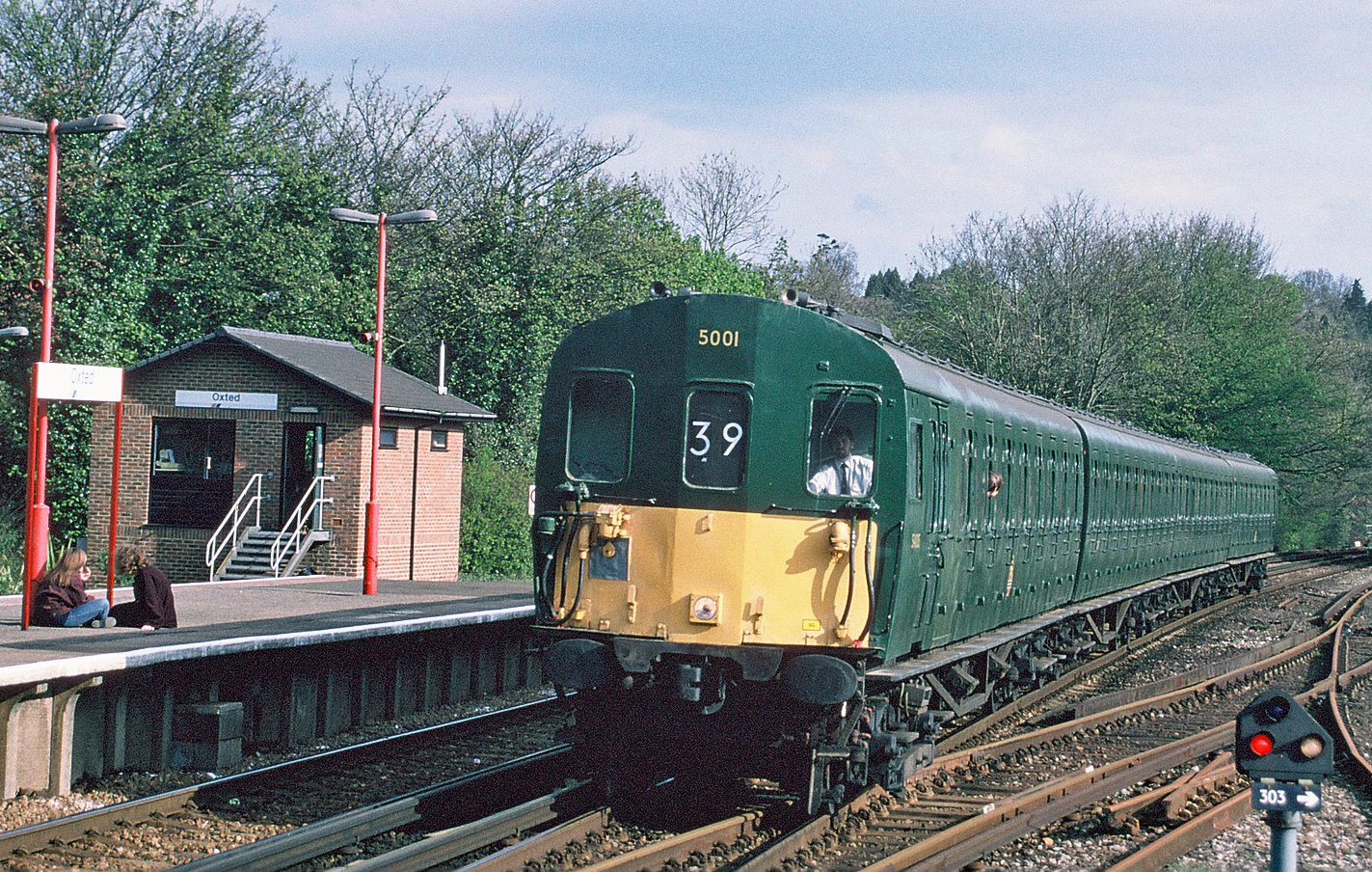
- Class 415 at Oxted
- In service: 1951–1995
- Manufacturer: BR Eastleigh
- Number built: 283
- Formation: power car + 2 trailer cars + power car
- Operator: British Rail
- Depots: Selhurst; Slade Green; Wimbledon

Specifications
- Maximum speed: 75 mph (121 km/h)
- Traction motors: Four EE507
- Power output: 4 x 250 hp (190 kW) total 1,000 hp (750 kW)
- Electric system: 750 V DC third rail
- Braking system: Electro Pneumatic Brake (EPB)

The British Rail Class 415 (or 4EPB) is a suburban 750 V DC third rail electric multiple unit commissioned by the Southern Region of British Railways. Built between 1951 and 1957, it became the most numerous class on the region after the withdrawal of the 4SUBs. The final trains were withdrawn in the 1990s, replaced by Class 455, 456, 465 and 466.

The British Rail designation Class 415 was applied to a group of four coach, third rail electric multiple units constructed between 1951 and 1961 and in service from 1951 to 1995.

== Construction ==
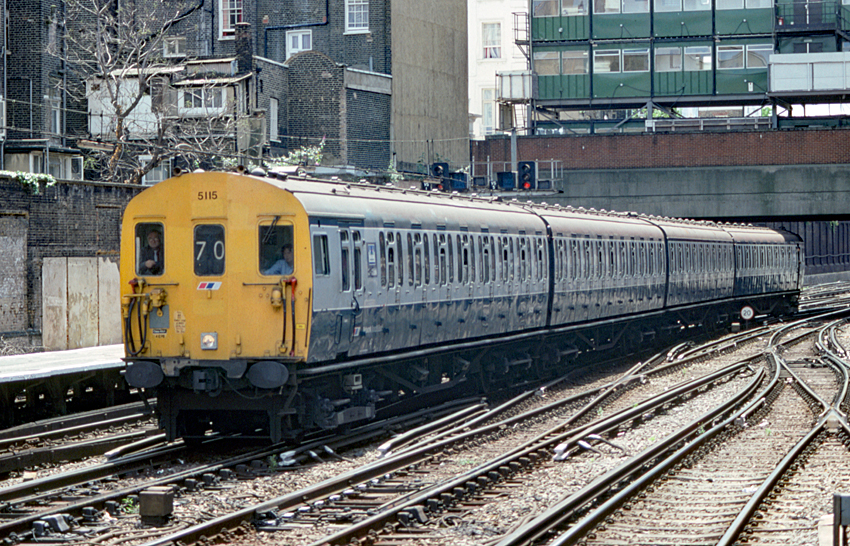
5115 4-EPB unit approaching London Victoria

The 4EPB units (4-car Electro-Pneumatic Brake) were a development of the Southern Railway (SR) 4Sub design, but incorporating electro-pneumatic brakes, unit-to-unit buckeye couplings, roller blind headcode displays in place of the stencil holders used previously, a revised front and without external doors to the driver's cab – access was via the adjacent guard's compartment. There were motor-generators for the lighting and current control whereas previous practice had been to use series lighting and a voltage divider for the control circuits.

The first units built were designed by Oliver Bulleid and as a consequence were based on Southern Railway designs and utilised standard Southern railway jigs, being constructed using standard Southern Railway components such as doors and being built to a standard Southern body profile; they were mounted on underframes reclaimed from older cars, the wooden bodies of which were scrapped. The doyen of the class, unit 5001, was completed at Eastleigh in 1951. Further examples were built at Eastleigh up until 1957. Altogether, 213 units were built: in 78 of the units, one car was a former 4-SUB trailer rewired to operate with 4-EPB stock. The motor bogies of cars 14001–106 (units 5001–53) were known as the "eastern" type, and had a wheelbase of 9 feet (2.7 m); those of cars 14201–520 (units 5101–5260) were known as the "central" type, and had a wheelbase of 8 feet 6 inches (2.59 m). The "eastern" motor bogies were later replaced by the "central" type, the process being completed in 1964, but the cars (and units) were not renumbered.

The formation of each unit was similar to the later 4-SUB units. That is, there were two driving motor brake third open cars comprising a driving cab, guard's compartment and eight-bay passenger saloon having 82 seats; between these were a trailer third having ten compartments providing 120 seats (cars 15005 and 15038 had nine compartments seating 108) and a trailer third open having ten seating bays providing 102 seats. The total capacity of each unit was accordingly 386 seats, except units 5005 and 5220 which seated 374. Third class was renamed second class in 1956, and the car designations became driving motor brake second open (DMBSO), trailer second (TS) and trailer second open (TSO).

Orders and numbers, SR design units
Order number	Order date	Unit numbers	Quantity	DMBSO (Note: Two per unit)	TS	TSO	Built
3638	16 January 1950	5001–15	15	14001–30	—	15101–15	November 1951 – September 1952
3756	2 February 1951	5016–33	18	14031–66	—	15116–33	April – September 1953
3757	2 February 1951	5034–53	20	14067–106	15159–78	15134–53	September 1953 – February 1954
3757	2 February 1951	5101–5	5	14201–10	15179–83	15154–8	November 1953 – January 1954
3798	29 May 1951	5001–15	15	—	15001–15	—	1945–48 (Note: Converted from 4-SUB cars)
3799	29 May 1951	5016–33	18	—	15016–33	—	1946–48
4016	14 July 1953	5106–55	50	14211–310	15184–233	15234–83	February 1954 – February 1955
4099	30 March 1954	5156–5205	50	14311–410	15284–333	15334–83	February 1955 – January 1956
4172	11 February 1955	5206–15	10	14411–30	15384–93	15394–403	February – April 1956
4173	11 February 1955	5216–60	45	14431–520	—	15404–48	April 1956 – March 1957
4174	11 February 1955	5216–60	45	—	15034–78	—	1946–48

In 1960, the first British Railways design units appeared. Intended to replace the 1925 design Southern Railway suburban electric stock, these units were based on British Railways Mark 1 coaching stock with a different body profile and underframe length from the earlier Class 415 units. The first two units (5301/02), however, were composed of Mark One profile Driving Motor Brake Seconds and Southern Railway profile intermediate vehicles. Unit 5303 was the first to sport intermediate trailers of Mark 1 profile. Two units differed from the rest of the batch in featuring B5 (S) bogies to enable use on peak hour commuter trains to Eastbourne. Reformations over the years, following accidents and incidents, led to a few units becoming composed of a mixture of original design stock of Southern Railway outline and the later, Mark 1 based, British Railways stock.

Orders and numbers, BR Standard design units
Lot number	Order date	Unit numbers	Type	Car numbers (Note: Two cars per unit)	Quantity	Built	Completed
30582	2 February 1959	5303–56	DMBSO	61516–623	108	1960–61	30 December 1961
30583	2 February 1959	5303–56	TSo	70375–482	108	1960–61	30 December 1961
30713	25 July 1961	5357–70	DMBSO	61989–62016	28	1962–63	26 January 1963
30714	25 July 1961	5357–70	TSo	70667–94	28	1962–63	26 January 1963

In the earlier, Southern-style 5001–5053, 5101–5260 series, most units (all of which were one class only) comprised a driving motor open saloon including brake at each end of the set, sandwiching a trailer open and a high-density (6 per side) trailer ten-compartment vehicle with access from the passenger doors only; there was no gangway down the coach. A very small number of these 4-EPBs comprised either two open-trailers or two compartment-trailers. A small number of the trailers had been built as 'composites' – a mixture of First and Third Class – and were later fitted out as 9-compartment one-class vehicles but with the former 1st accommodation still identifiable with extra-wide compartments. In the mid-1960s, a number of compartments were marked as women-only, because of the density of cigarette smoke at rush-hour in the general compartments, but as these were not well-regarded they were withdrawn in the late 1960s in favour of non-smoking cars, marked by red triangles on the windows. At first one car per set was allocated to non-smoking, but soon one driving car and one trailer in each set were the norm.

The production vehicles in the BR series 5301-5370 had slightly higher capacity motor coaches, identical vehicles at each end of the set, with an internal partition splitting the saloon into two smaller ones, and a pair of identical trailers each comprising 5 compartments and a 5-bay open saloon, with the compartment end of each coach always back-to-back with its neighbour.

However, on 23 March 1988, a woman was found murdered in a compartment EPB car on an Orpington/London Victoria working which led to Network SouthEast reconfiguring the then-remaining unrefurbished SR-design 4-EPBs; as a result all compartment stock ran limited workings in busy periods and had a red stripe at the cantrail (the place where the bodysides meet the roof). This stock did not work in service after 8pm and was known as 4COM. These units, being heavier than the EPBs were retained for the winter of 1988/1989 to run overnight keeping the tracks clear of snow.

Most British Rail Class 415 units were withdrawn in the mid-1980s, owing to their partial replacement by newer stock such as the British Rail Class 455 units and the fact that many units contained asbestos. However, a significant number of the units were "facelifted". The asbestos was removed and the units' interiors were improved. This resulted in some re-numbering of stock, so that the earlier units built in the style of the Southern Railway became the 54xx series whilst the British Railways style units became the 56xx series. Some of the 56xx series units received express gear ratios to allow them to work services between London and Kent Coast destinations. Although all the non-refurbished BR Class 415/2s were withdrawn, three Class 415/1s of Southern Railway outline survived until the final withdrawal of Class 415 stock in 1995. These units included 5001, the first unit constructed, and 5176. Both of these units were repainted into liveries previously carried by the class, 5001 receiving British Railways green livery with yellow warning panels and 5176 receiving British Rail blue livery with full yellow ends.

== Interior fittings ==
A refurbishment in the late 1970s/early 1980s started converting the six-seat compartment stock to 3+2-seat open saloons. At the same time, the red-brown horsehair seating and metal-framed cord overhead luggage racks were replaced with standard Mark 2 seats and metal racks. 2 x 25w. ceiling bulbs lit each compartment, and the partitions were initially painted in light cream: three publicity panels about 15 cm x 40 cm (6" x 16") filled the space on the compartment walls between the top of the seats and the luggage racks – the central panel was originally a mirror, but as these proved dangerous in service they were soon replaced with normal advertising. The other fittings were a chain alarm-cord in a recess above and to one side of the door, and the door-lock itself, a simple spring-loaded slide: the slam-doors could be opened at speed, albeit at considerable risk to the passenger doing so. The door window could also be opened full-length into a recess in the door panel beneath, initially supported at the bottom by a leather strop, which was soon replaced by a metal friction-bar at the top, bearing on the side-rails – in general they were either closed or with a one- or two-inch opening. The flooring was a strong linoleum on wooded baulks: the linoleum was not present in the guards compartments, which together with the cabs were painted in a dark green. A mirror to a roof periscope facing along the length of the unit was fitted centrally to the guard's side of the rear compartment partition, together with a handle for the sweep-arm cleaner of the roof glass. Underneath was a small worksurface about 2'x1', a swivel-chair screwed to the floor, and variously a short ladder for evacuating coaches, sometimes a medical cabinet, and a rail-shorting bar would be fixed to the side of the compartment. The driver's cab was fitted with one flap-down seat on each side: the driver occupied the left-hand position.

== Summary of sub-classes ==
- 415/1 – unrefurbished 4EPB stock of Southern design, built 1951–57, numbered in the 50xx, 51xx and 52xx series.
- 415/2 – unrefurbished 4EPB stock of BR design, built 1960–63, numbered in the 53xx series.
- 415/4 – refurbished 4EPB stock of Southern design (from 1980), numbered in the 54xx series.
- 415/5 – Consolidated compartment 4EPB stock of both designs, numbered in the 55xx series.
- 415/6 – refurbished 4EPB stock of BR design, numbered in the 56xx series.
- 415/7 – refurbished 4EPB stock of BR design, with express gearing to 90 mph. These units retained *56xx series numbers.

== Accidents and incidents ==
- On 9 August 1957, car 14450 of unit 5225 was destroyed in the Staines rail crash. In 1958 it was replaced by 14407 from 5204.
- On 4 December 1957, car 14408 of unit 5204 was destroyed in the Lewisham collision. The unit was disbanded and the remaining cars later used in other units.
- On 4 July 1958, 5023 was in a head-on collision with an empty stock train at Maze Hill, London after it overran signals. Forty-five people were injured and leading car 14045 written off. The unit was disbanded and the other cars later used in other units. One of its cars, 14046, was transferred into unit 5031, which was later renumbered 5484 and was involved in the Cannon Street accident in 1991.
- On 12 October 1972, 5220 was standing at Wimbledon station when a freight train ran into it. Twelve people were injured. Car 14440 was written off and replaced by 14260. The accident was caused by inattention on the part of the driver of the freight train which was hauled by E6001.
- On 23 March 1988, Deborah Linsley was murdered travelling from Petts Wood in the compartment of a class 415 operating a service to London Victoria. Her body was discovered at the train's final destination.The murder is still unsolved.
- On 22 January 1990, unit 5408 collided with the buffers at Beckenham Junction on arrival from London Bridge and was derailed.
- On 8 January 1991, 5618 and 5484, along with 2EPB 6227 formed the train involved in the Cannon Street station rail crash, in which a train from Sevenoaks slammed into the buffers at London Cannon Street station. Although the speed was low, telescoping of two carriages occurred. Two passengers were killed and 542 injured. The accident was caused by a misjudgement on the part of the driver, possibly due to the effects of cannabis use.

== Preservation ==
One unit, Class 415/1 unit 5176, survives. One of the two "heritage" units (along with 5001), it was repainted in British Rail blue in the early 1990s and survived until the end of EPB workings in 1995. After spending several years in storage, in 1999 the unit was split, with three vehicles going to the Northamptonshire Ironstone Railway Trust and one intermediate trailer vehicle to the Electric Railway Museum, Warwickshire near Coventry. Class pioneer 5001 was also stored at Kineton Ministry of Defence base following withdrawal in 1995 but no buyer could be found and the unit was stripped and sold for scrap in 2004. Only two vehicles remain at the Northamptonshire Ironstone Railway, with Trailer 15354 having been moved from now-closed Electric Railway Museum to the 1:1 Collection Building at Margate, as a donor/spares vehicle for the 4SUB unit 4732, and Trailer 15396 sold to the Swanage Railway to be broken up as spares for the railway's fleet of Bulleid loco hauled stock.

Unit number (current in bold)			DMBSO	TSO	TSO	DMBSO	Built	Livery	Location
-	**5176**	-	14351			14352	1954 Eastleigh	BR Blue	Northampton Ironstone Railway
-	**5176**	-		15354			1954 Eastleigh	BR Blue	1:1 Collection, Margate
-	**5176**	-			15396		1954 Eastleigh	BR Blue	Swanage Railway (scrapped)
