= British Rail Class 455 =

Electric multiple-unit passenger train built by BREL York between 1982 and 1985

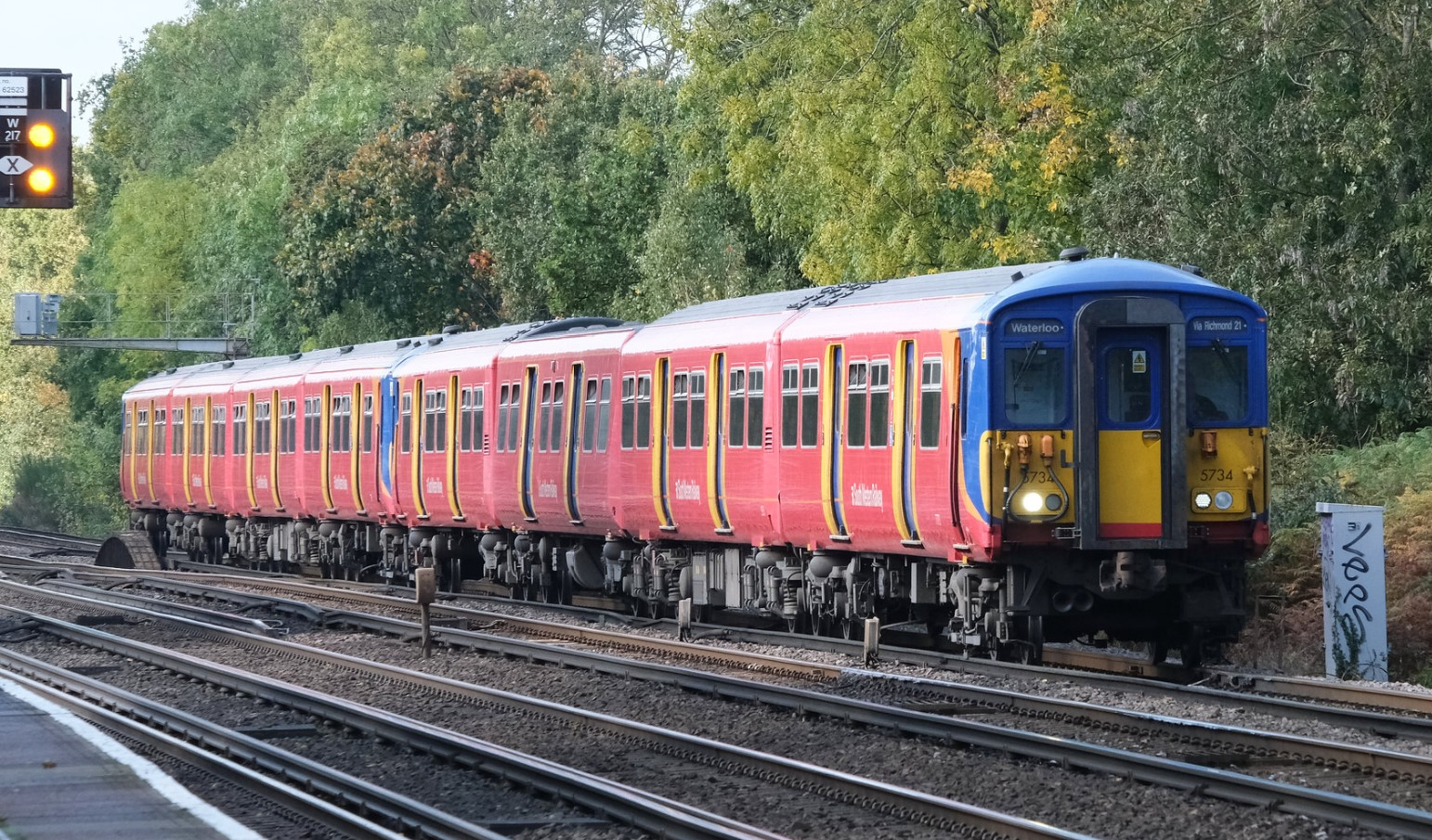
- South Western Railway Class 455 train in 2024

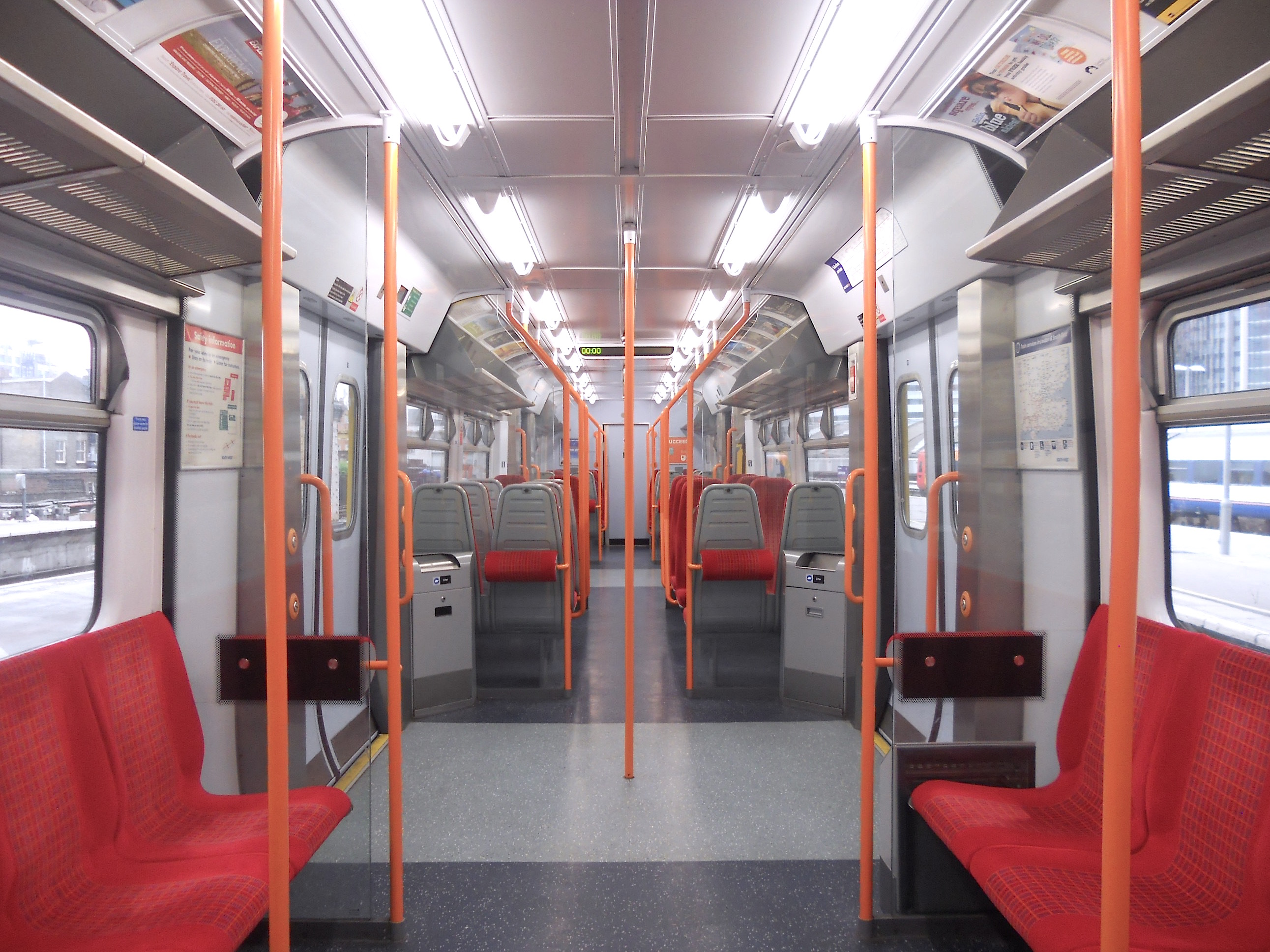
- Interior of a refurbished South West Trains Class 455/9
- In service: 1983–2026
- Manufacturer: British Rail Engineering Limited
- Built at: Holgate Road Works, York
- Family name: BR Second Generation (Mark 3)
- Replaced: Class 405; Class 415; Class 508
- Constructed: 1982–1985
- Entered service: 1983
- Retired: 2022–2026
- Scrapped: 2022–present
- Number built: 137; (43 × 455/7, with Class 508 TSO vehicles); (74 × 455/8); (20 × 455/9)
- Number preserved: 1
- Number scrapped: 107
- Successor: Class 701 (SWR); Class 377 (Southern)
- Formation: 4 cars per unit: DTSO-MSO-TSO-DTSO
- Diagram: 455/7 & /9 DTSO vehs.: EE226; 455/8 DTSO vehs.: EE218; 455/7 & /9 MSO vehs.: EC206; 455/8 MSO vehs.: EC203; 455/7 TSO vehs.: EH219; 455/8 TSO vehs.: EH221; 455/9 TSO vehs.: EH224
- Fleet numbers: 455701–455742; 455750; 455801–455874; 455901–455920
- Capacity: As built: 316 seats; SN refurb.: 307 seats; SWT refurb.: 244 seats
- Owners: Porterbrook; Southern Electric Traction Group
- Operators: British Rail; Network SouthEast; Network SouthCentral; Connex South Central; Southern; South West Trains; South Western Railway (First MTR); South Western Railway
- Depots: Strawberry Hill (London); Wimbledon (London)

Specifications
- Car body construction: 455/7 TSOs: aluminium; All others: steel
- Train length: 81.16 m (266 ft 3 in)
- Car length: DTSO: 19.83 m (65 ft 1 in); MSO/TSO: 19.92 m (65 ft 4 in)
- Width: 2.82 m (9 ft 3 in)
- Height: 455/7 TSOs: 3.58 m (11 ft 9 in); All others: 3.77 m (12 ft 4 in)
- Floor height: 1.14 m (3 ft 9 in)
- Doors: Double-leaf pocket sliding (2 per side per car) (Note: Door throughways 1.010 m (3 ft 3.8 in) on all vehicles, except for 455/7 TSO vehicles at 1.288 m (4 ft 2.7 in).)
- Wheelbase: Over bogie centres: 14.17 m (46 ft 6 in)
- Maximum speed: 75 mph (121 km/h)
- Weight: DTSO: 29.5 t (29.0 long tons; 32.5 short tons); MSO: 45.6 t (44.9 long tons; 50.3 short tons); 455/7 TSO: 25.5 t (25.1 long tons; 28.1 short tons); 455/8 & /9 TSO: 27.1 t (26.7 long tons; 29.9 short tons)
- Traction system: As built: Camshaft-controlled DC; SWR refurbished: Vossloh Kiepe IGBT-VVVF
- Traction motors: As built: 4 × English Electric 507-20J, each of 153 kW (205 hp); SWR refurbished: 4 × TSA TME 52-35-4, each of 250 kW (335 hp)
- Power output: As built: 610 kW (820 hp); Refurbished: 1,000 kW (1,300 hp)
- Acceleration: 0.58 m/s^{2} (1.9 ft/s^{2})
- Electric systems: 750 V DC third rail
- Current collection: Contact shoe
- UIC classification: 2′2′+Bo′Bo′+2′2′+2′2′
- Bogies: 455/7 TSOs: BREL BX1; MSOs: BREL BP27; Others: BREL BT13
- Minimum turning radius: 70 m (231 ft)
- Braking systems: As built: Electro-pneumatic (disc) and rheostatic (Westcode); SWR refurbished: Adds regenerative; (Knorr-Bremse EP98)
- Safety systems: AWS; TPWS
- Coupling system: Tightlock
- Multiple working: Within class, and with Class 456
- Track gauge: 1,435 mm (4 ft 8 1/2 in) standard gauge

The British Rail Class 455 are Mark 3-based electric multiple unit (EMU) passenger trains built by BREL between 1982 and 1985. Upon their introduction, they replaced Class 508s as well as aging Southern Railway slam-door stock on commuter services out of London Waterloo.

Whilst the trains were originally built utilising recycled DC traction equipment from Southern Railway 4Sub rolling stock from the 1940s, South West Trains refitted their units with AC traction equipment provided by Vossloh in 2017; despite this change however the trains retained their original gearboxes. The units were last operated on suburban services in Greater London and Surrey by Southern in May 2022, and by South Western Railway in March 2026. They were replaced by the Class 701 EMU on the South Western Railway network.

== Description ==
The Class 455 was originally to be classified as the Class 510, which were planned as a 750 V DC version of the Class 317. However, as the chopper control system at the time was not considered robust enough for the electrically rougher third rail Southern Region, they were fitted with GEC Traction camshaft-control systems instead. The Class 510 designation was changed to Class 455.

The class has the same bodyshell as the Class 317 and Class 318, but as they were designed for inner suburban services they do not feature first class seating, air conditioning or toilet facilities and are restricted to 75 mph (121 km/h). Like the Class 317/318, as well as the diesel Class 150, they are based on the British Rail Mark 3, with a steel construction, unlike the earlier PEP based Class 313, Class 314, Class 315, Class 507 and Class 508, which have aluminium alloy bodies.

Between 1982 and 1985, a total of 505 carriages were built by British Rail Engineering Limited's Holgate Road carriage works. When combined with 43 existing trailers from Class 508s, they formed 137 four-car sets. The Class 455 allowed the Class 405 and Class 415 to be withdrawn, as well as allowing the Class 508 units to be transferred to the Merseyside network for which they were originally intended. They also allowed other stock to be cascaded to the North London and Oxted lines.

There were three batches of Class 455 units, all consisting of four cars: driving trailer vehicles at each end, an intermediate trailer vehicle and an intermediate motorised vehicle (powered by four EE507-20J of 185 kW carried on the bogies of the MSO vehicle, some recovered from Class 405s), all originally built to the standard class 3+2 seating arrangement with 316 seats. Technically, they are formed DTSO+MSO+TSO+DTSO.

=== Class 455/7 ===
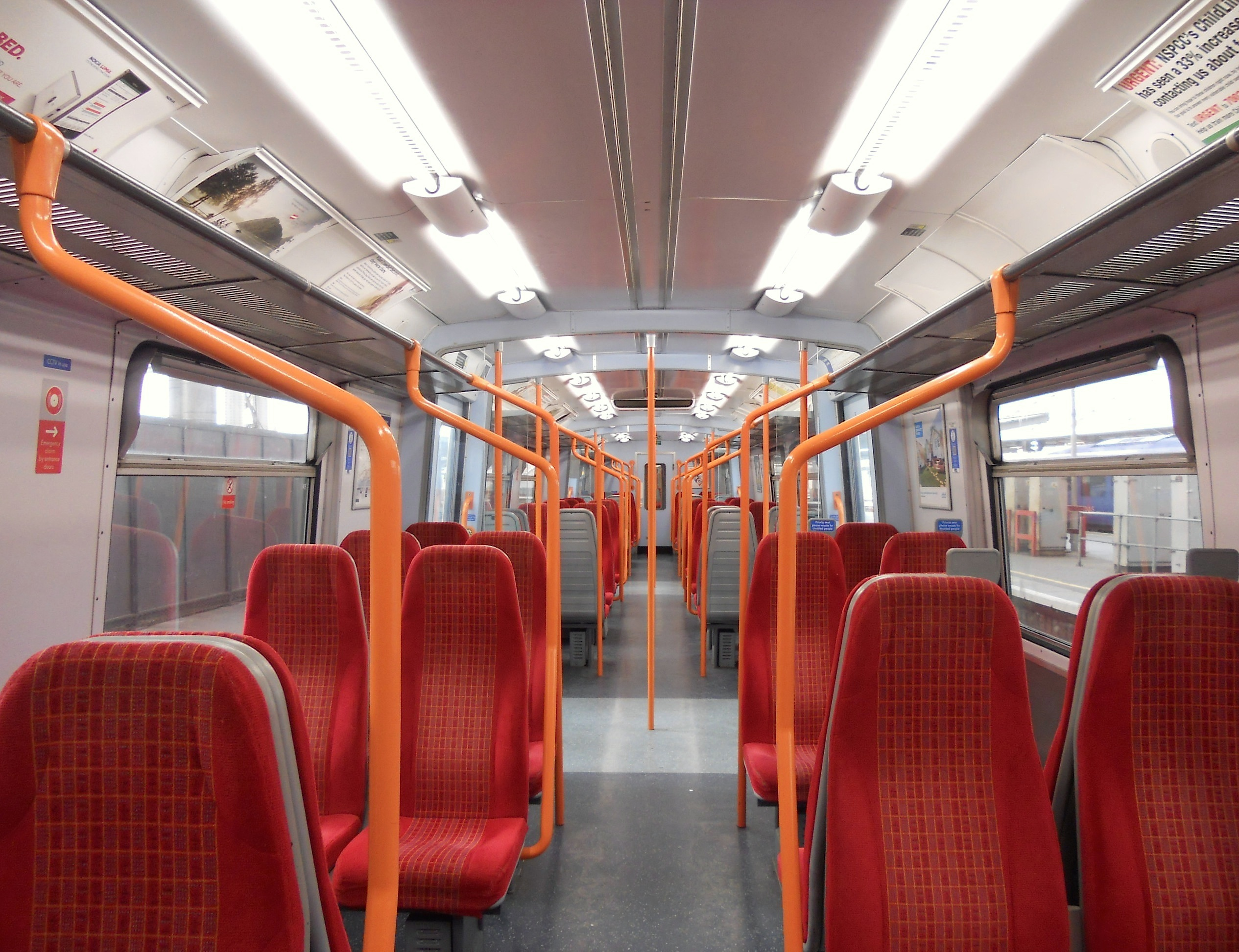
Interior of a former Class 508 trailer from a South West Trains refurbished Class 455/7

The Class 455/7 units were built in 1984–1985. There are 43 four-car units, all allocated to South Western Railway at Wimbledon depot. They differ from the Class 455/8 in having a revised front end (air horns relocated next to the coupler and revised headlamp clusters) that was later used on Class 317/2 and Class 318 units.

No new intermediate trailer (TSO) vehicles were produced for this subclass; instead, they use redundant TSO vehicles that had been removed from Class 508 units prior to those units being transferred to Merseyrail in Liverpool. The reused vehicles can be recognised by their lower and wider profile compared to 'normal' Class 455 vehicles, as well as different windows.

=== Class 455/8 ===
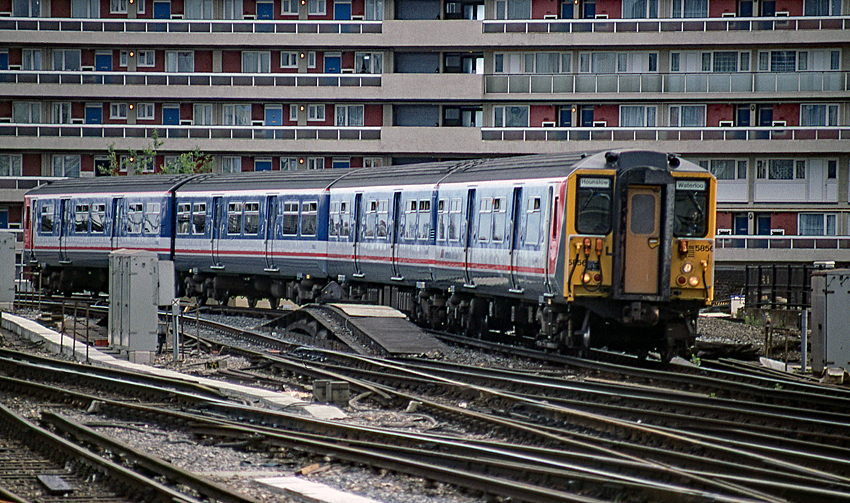
Network SouthEast Class 455/8 approaching Waterloo in 1990

The Class 455/8 units were built between 1982 and 1984. These include all 46 units formerly operated by Southern (allocated to Stewarts Lane depot) and 28 allocated to South Western Railway (at Wimbledon depot). The last full day of service of the Southern Class 455/8 was 14 May 2022, with the final service ran in the early hours of 15 May 2022.

=== Class 455/9 ===
The Class 455/9 units were built in 1985, and all 20 units are allocated to South Western Railway at Wimbledon depot. These were similar to the 455/7s, except that they had new-build TSOs.

In 1990, two units were fitted with chopper traction control to demonstrate the feasibility of operation on the South Western Railway. Car No. 5912 and Nos. 5916–20 were equipped with chopper systems manufactured by GEC Traction (No. 5912) and Brush (Nos. 5916–20), respectively. During the test runs, the GEC system showed only marginal energy savings, while the Brush system suffered from ongoing reliability problems with its traction control. Eventually, both cars reverted to their original resistance control systems.

In connection with the Crossrail project, which was rejected in 1994, two trailer cars were modified to take plug doors. Both were coupled and ran in service in this condition. After an extended period in service, it was found that the modifications had slightly weakened the overall structure. One train was re-fitted with sliding doors, but the other was removed from service, remaining at Eastleigh Works to be cannibalised for spare parts. The latter car served as a demonstrator for the South West Trains refurbished full red livery until it was scrapped in 2005.

Two units later gained replacement carriages that had originally been part of the prototype Class 210 DEMU, which had the same bodyshell. 455912's TSO was replaced by 67400. 455913's MSO 62838, which had been crushed by a cement mixer lorry falling off a bridge, was replaced with 67301, which had originally been a Class 210 DTSO and was later a DMSO in the experimental Class 457. The undamaged end of 62838 was used to replace the former cab end of 67301; the remainder of 62838 was scrapped.

The last units of the 455/9 fleet were scrapped in late 2025.

== Operations ==
=== British Rail ===
Deliveries commenced in 1982 to Strawberry Hill. On 16 November 1982, a train was unveiled at Waterloo, with the first entering service on 28 March 1983. All were initially allocated to Wimbledon Depot working services on the Central and South Western divisions. The Central Division 455/8s were transferred to Selhurst in 1986 after modifications to the depot were completed. All were delivered in British Rail blue and grey livery; it had been anticipated that some or all 455/9s would be painted in a green variant of the 'Jaffa Cake' London & SouthEast livery, but this was overruled by the BR Design Panel. From 1986 all 455s were progressively repainted in Network SouthEast white, blue and red livery. In May 1991, 455743 was renumbered 455750 and renamed Wimbledon Traincare Depot in recognition of the depot obtaining BS5750 quality services accreditation.

During April 1994, amid the lead up to the privatisation of British Rail, 46 trains were allocated to the Network SouthCentral shadow franchise and sold to Eversholt. The remainder were allocated to the South West Trains shadow franchise and sold to Porterbrook.

=== Connex South Central / Southern ===
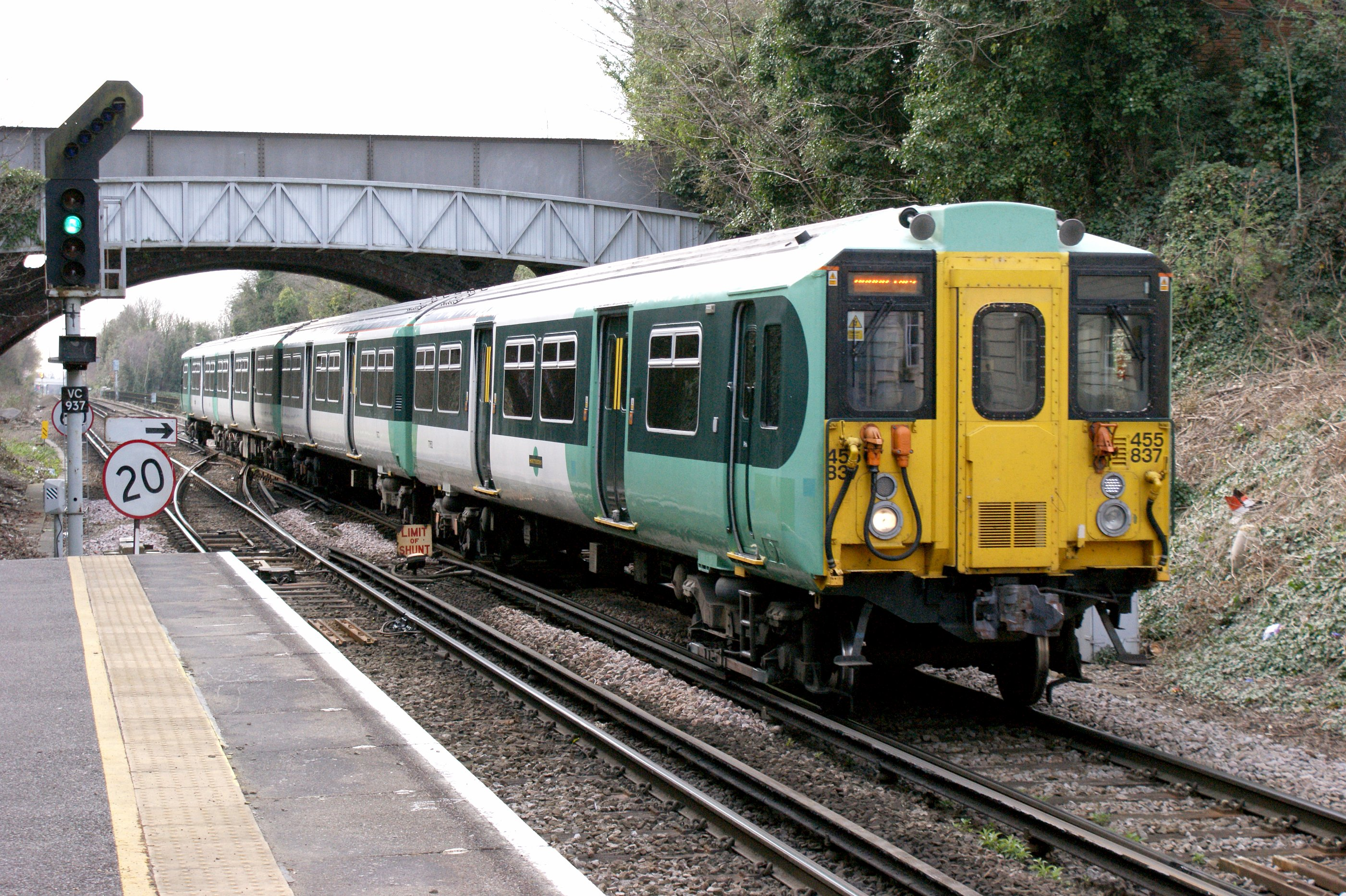
Southern Class 455/8 at Sutton in 2009, showing the updated cab front

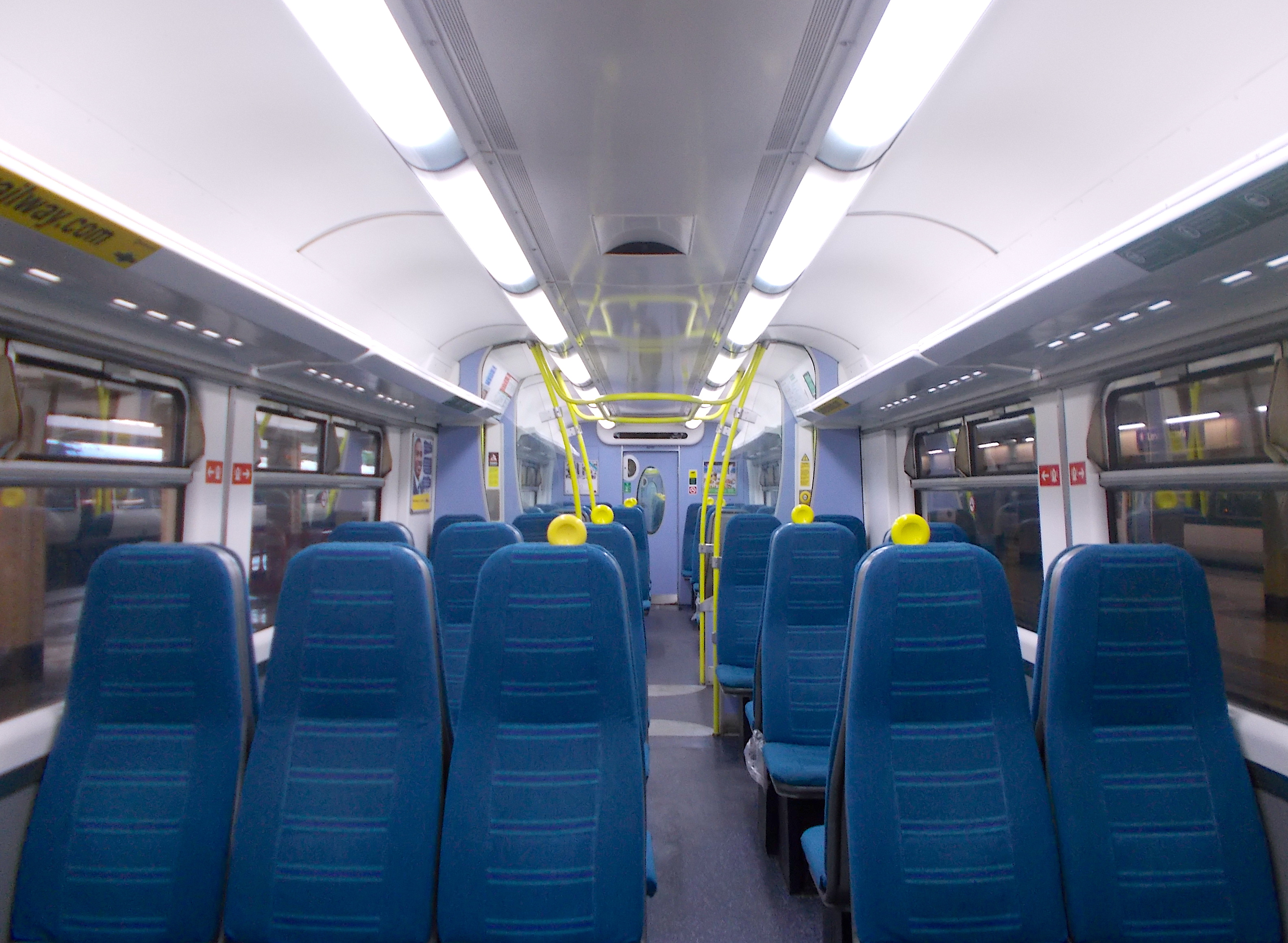
The interior aboard a Southern refurbished Class 455/8

On 13 October 1996, the Network SouthCentral shadow franchise was taken over by Connex South Central, using 46 Class 455 trains. In the late 1990s, 16 were repainted in Connex's white and yellow livery. In August 2001, the franchise passed to Southern with all 46 transferred. Some were repainted in Southern's white and green livery. Between February 2004 and February 2006, all were refurbished by Alstom at Eastleigh Works. New 3+2 high back seating as fitted to the Class 377 and the removal of cab end gangways to facilitate the installation of driver's air-conditioning were notable features.

A second refurbishment programme started for the Southern units in June 2012. This included a repaint and interior changes, such as changes to the grab rails on the top between each door. The refurbishment of the first train was completed in August 2012, and the project was completed in December 2013.

A third refurbishment programme began in January 2018 for the 455s to become compliant with the PRM 2020 specifications.

Southern Class 455 units were used on inner and outer suburban services out of London to destinations in South London and Surrey, before being withdrawn in May 2022. They were not directly replaced, as the May 2022 timetable planned all Class 455 services to be operated by existing Class 377s. A farewell tour for the Southern Class 455 units took place on 14 May 2022.

The first pair of Southern Class 455s (455838 and 455839) were sent for scrap on 4 May 2022.

=== South West Trains / South Western Railway ===
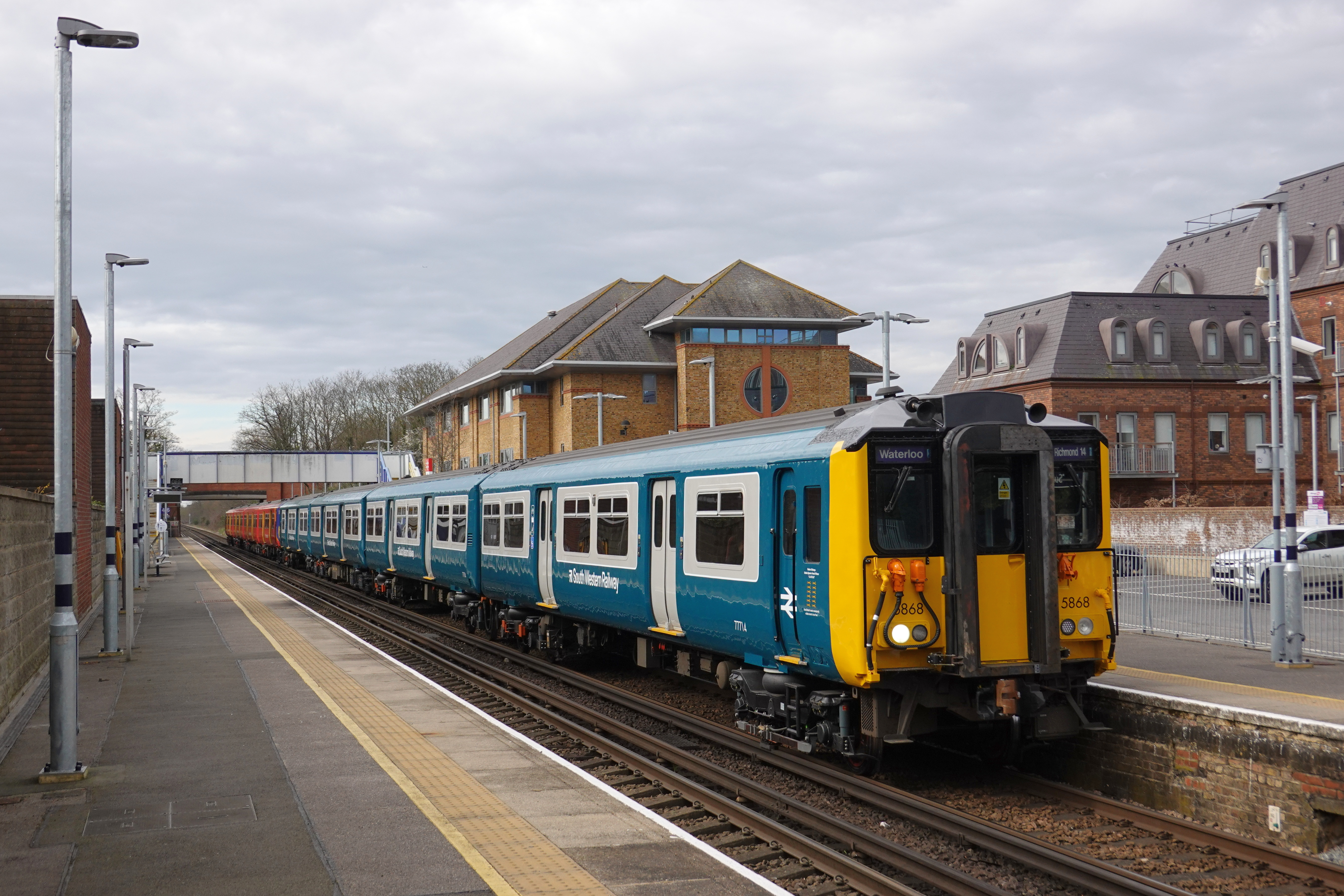
British Rail liveried Class 455 at Sunbury in 2024

In February 1996, all South Western division 455s were transferred to South West Trains (SWT). From September 1996, SWT began to modify the Network SouthEast livery with a Stagecoach orange brand added. In November 2004, SWT took delivery of the first unit refurbished by Bombardier, Ashford. The work involved replacing the original seats with high-back Grammar seats (similar to those fitted to Class 450 units) in 2+2 configuration, modifying the doorways so that the sliding doors can open further, and the repainting of the units in a new predominantly red livery. The last was completed in March 2008.

In April 2013, it was announced that the SWT units would be fitted with a new alternating current traction system provided by Vossloh Kiepe. The project works commenced in June 2014 and involved replacing the original pneumatically actuated camshaft control system with a solid-state insulated-gate bipolar transistor (IGBT) inverter and variable-voltage/variable-frequency (VVVF) drive, and exchanging the as-built English Electric DC traction motors with new AC units. The upgraded units also received new Knorr-Bremse brake controllers, which allows regenerative braking in addition to the existing rheostatic function.

The new traction motors are each 500 kg (1,100 lb) lighter than the DC originals, and the traction system upgrade as a whole improves reliability and reduces overall operating and maintenance costs. Additionally, as the upgrade reduced the amount of time Class 455 units spent being inspected and serviced in depots, South West Trains were able to proceed with the introduction of new Class 707 units without needing to acquire more depot space.

All units passed to South Western Railway with the South Western franchise change in August 2017. They were used on most London commuter rail routes from London Waterloo to South West London and neighbouring areas.

South Western Railway had intended to replace its fleet with Class 701 Aventra units from 2019; however this was initially deferred to mid-2020 and was deferred again to 2021. The first Aventras began to enter service starting on 9 January 2024, with Class 455 trains gradually withdrawn as Aventras entered service. Due to the issues with the Aventras' introduction to service, owners of the Class 455 EMUs, Porterbrook Rail, began a programme of rectification and corrosion inspection.

In the early months of 2024, unit 455868 received a repaint into British Rail Blue and Grey livery. The repaint was made to celebrate the career of the class, and also its reliability, as the fleet has won many Golden Spanner awards during its service with both operators. A farewell tour for the South Western Railway Class 455 fleet took place on 21 December 2025 operated by the Branch Line Society.

Despite the farewell to the units taking place at the end of 2025, Class 455 units remained in occasional passenger service until 20 March 2026, with South Western Railway citing "fleet shortages across the network" for their continued use.

== Preservation ==
On 16 February 2026, it was announced that the Southern Electric Traction Group had acquired 455871 from Porterbrook.

== Accidents and incidents ==
- On 18 February 1990, unit 455820 collided with a fallen tree obstructing the line at Gipsy Hill and was derailed. Unit 455802 then collided with 455820.
- On 17 October 2000, South West Trains unit 455730 collided with a bus at 60mph at Pooley Green level crossing near Egham station, derailing the train but causing no serious injuries.
- On 12 September 2006, a South West Trains service from London Waterloo to Effingham Junction became derailed as it approached Epsom. One bogie of the fourth coach became derailed due to a track defect. The train came to a stop partly in the station so the passengers were able to disembark. There were no injuries with only minor damage to the track and train.
- On 5 November 2010, a concrete mixer went over the edge of a bridge over the railway line near Oxshott, landing on the 15:05 South West Trains service from Guildford to London Waterloo. The train was formed of two Class 455 units, 455741 and 455913. The end of the roof of the sixth carriage was severely crushed. Further damage was sustained to the fifth, sixth, seventh and eighth carriages, with the latter being derailed at its trailing bogie, although the train remained upright. The lorry driver and one passenger suffered serious injuries; a further five passengers suffered minor injuries. Unit 455913 was repaired at Wolverton railway works, at a cost of £1.6 million, and returned to service in July 2013. It was also fitted with an ex Class 210 driving vehicle which has been converted to an intermediate vehicle whilst retaining its existing number of 67301. Original vehicle 62838 was damaged beyond repair in the accident and was scrapped.
- On 7 July 2017, an explosion occurred in an underframe equipment case of unit 455901 at Guildford station. Debris was thrown up to 230 feet (70 m) away. No injuries occurred. The cause of the explosion was a faulty capacitor which had been fitted when the units' electrical equipment was upgraded. A manufacturing defect in the new traction equipment has caused three failures in service and five under test. Two of the failures in service involved unit 455726, the other involved unit 455901. In the most serious incident, on 7 July 2017, fragments, described as "quite sizeable" by the Rail Accident Investigation Branch, were scattered across platforms and an adjacent car park at Guildford station.
- On 15 August 2017, two Class 455 units formed part of a train with Class 456 unit 456015 which was derailed at London Waterloo. The cause of the accident was errors made in the wiring of the signalling during work to increase capacity at Waterloo. Neither of the Class 455 units was damaged.

== Fleet details ==
Class	Operator	Qty.	Year built	Cars per unit	Unit numbers
455/7	Stored	22	1984–1985	4	455701–455702, 455709–455712, 455714, 455716–455717, 455719–455721, 455723, 455727–455732, 455734, 455737, 455750
455/7	Scrapped	20	1984–1985	4	455703–455706, 455708, 455713, 455715, 455718, 455722, 455724–455726, 455733, 455735–455736, 455738–455742
455/7	TBC	1	1984–1985	4	455707
455/8	Preserved	1	1982–1984	4	455871
455/8	Stored	6	1982–1984	4	455849, 455852, 455863, 455869–455870, 455873
455/8	Scrapped	67	1982–1984	4	455801–455848, 455850–455851, 455853–455862, 455864–455868, 455872, 455874
455/9	Scrapped	20	1985	4	455901–455920

=== Named units ===
The following units have received names:

- 455750 Wimbledon Traincare Depot
- 455871 Roy Watts MBE Chairman of the Bluebell Railway Preservation Society.
