= British Rail Class 456 =

British electric multiple-unit passenger train

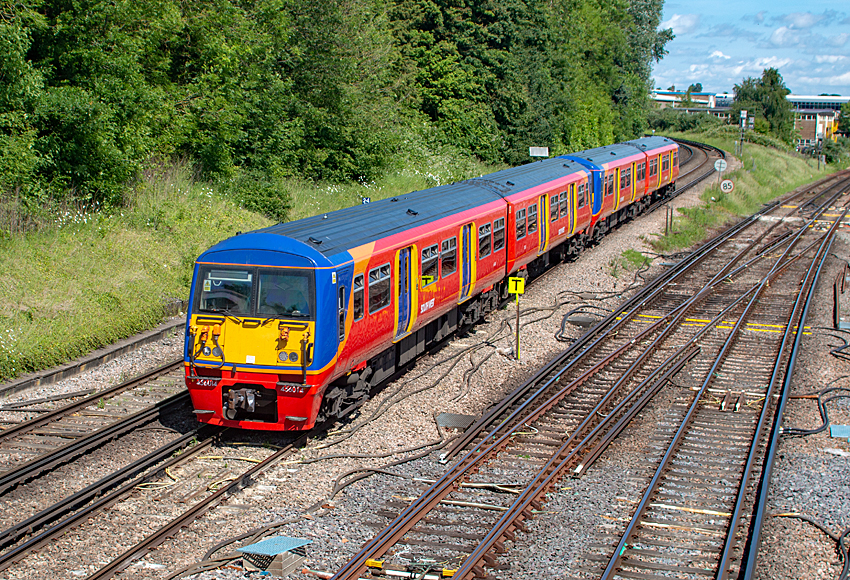
- South West Trains Class 456 approaching Guildford

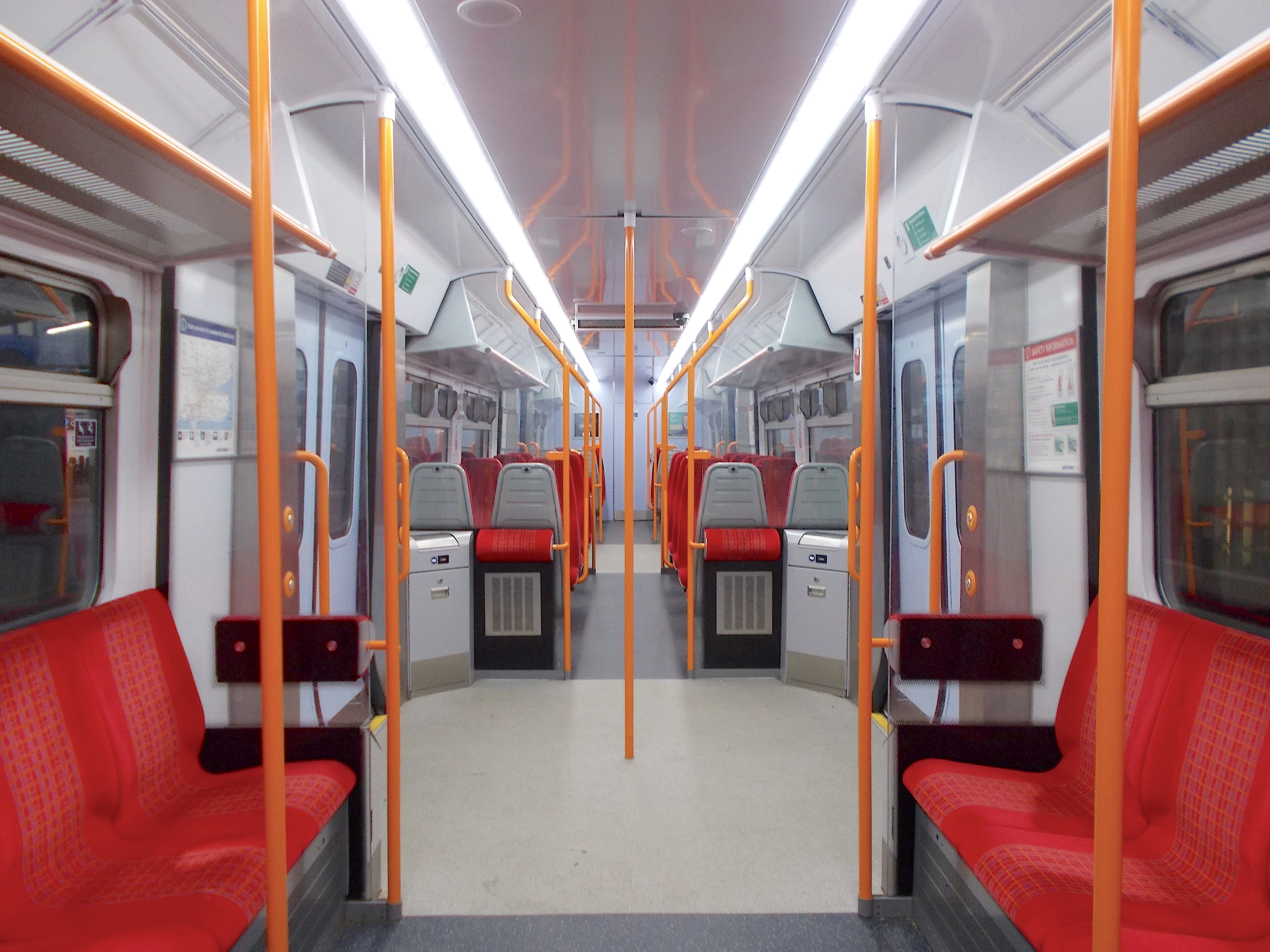
- Interior of a South West Trains Class 456 after refurbishment
- In service: September 1991 – 17 January 2022
- Manufacturer: British Rail Engineering Limited
- Built at: York Carriage Works, York
- Family name: BR Second Generation (Mark 3)
- Constructed: 1990–1991
- Refurbished: 2005–2007 by Southern; 2014–2015 by South West Trains
- Scrapped: 2022
- Number built: 24
- Number scrapped: 24
- Successor: Class 377 (Southern)
- Formation: 2 cars per unit: DMSO-DTSO
- Fleet numbers: 456001–456024
- Capacity: 152 seats
- Owner: Porterbrook
- Operators: Connex South Central; Network SouthEast; South West Trains; South Western Railway; Southern
- Depots: Selhurst (Croydon); Wimbledon (London)

Specifications
- Car body construction: Steel
- Car length: 19.95 m (65 ft 5 in)
- Width: 2.82 m (9 ft 3 in)
- Height: 3.78 m (12 ft 5 in)
- Doors: Double-leaf pocket sliding; (2 per side per car)
- Wheelbase: 14.17 m (46 ft 6 in); (over bogie centres)
- Maximum speed: 75 mph (121 km/h)
- Weight: 72.5 tonnes (71.4 long tons; 79.9 short tons)
- Power output: 500 hp (373 kW)
- Electric system: 750 V DC third rail
- Current collection: Contact shoe
- Minimum turning radius: 71 m (232 ft 11 in)
- Braking system: Air (Westcode)
- Safety systems: AWS; TPWS
- Coupling system: Tightlock
- Multiple working: Within class, and with Class 455
- Track gauge: 1,435 mm (4 ft 8 1/2 in) standard gauge

The British Rail Class 456 was a 2 car electric multiple unit passenger train introduced by Network SouthEast on inner-suburban services in South London to replace the old Class 416 units. Twenty-four two-car units were built by British Rail Engineering Limited's York Carriage Works in 1990 and 1991.

Following the privatisation of British Rail, the fleet was sold to Porterbrook and operated by Southern up until late 2013, when they were transferred to South West Trains and heavily refurbished.

== Entry into service ==
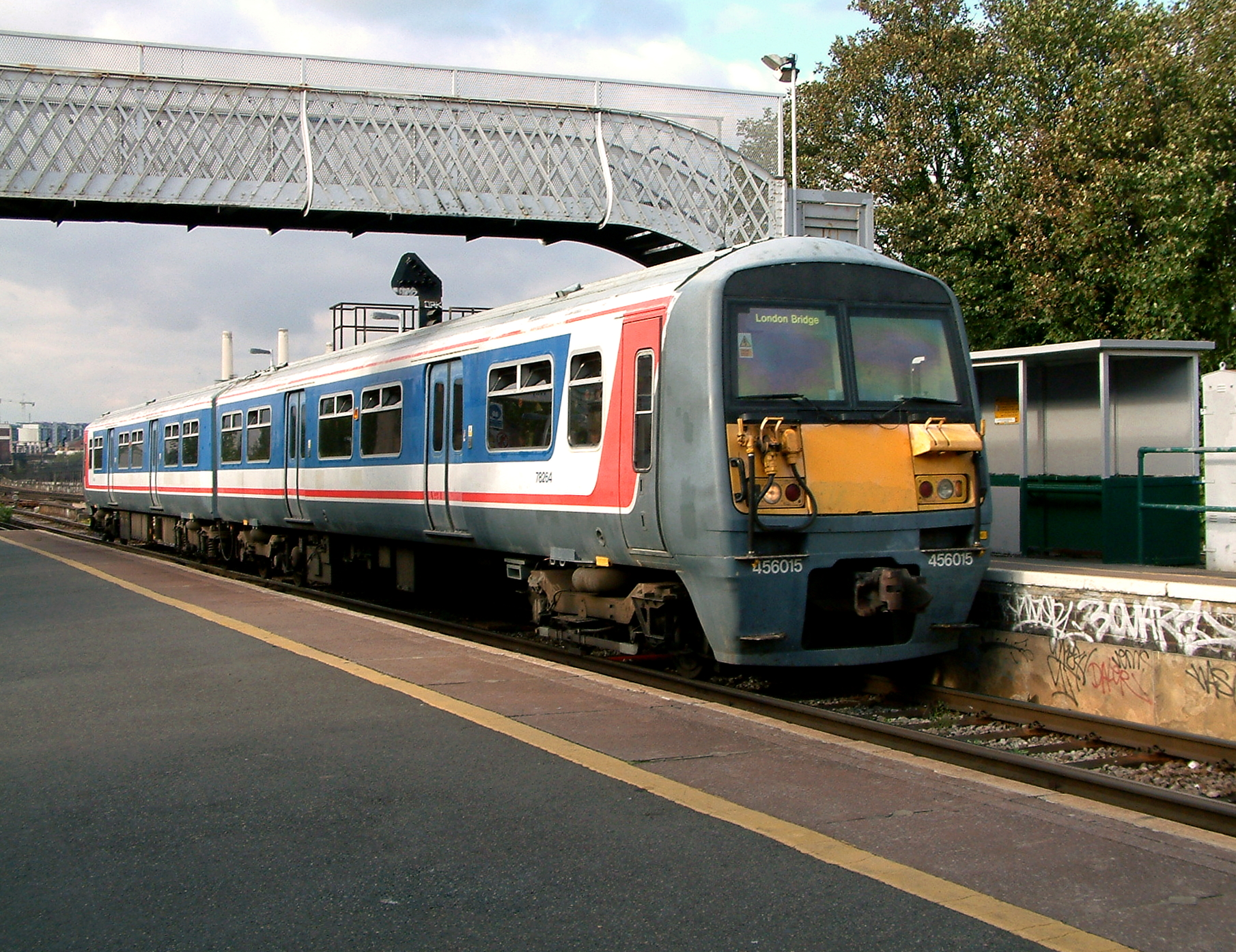
Class 456 in Network SouthEast livery at Wandsworth Road in 2004

While originally approved for use by Network SouthEast (NSE) on services out of Waterloo, the 24 two-car units were first accepted into traffic as direct replacements for the Class 416 2EPB units on the Central Division of the Southern Region of British Rail. Units were delivered into traffic painted in NSE blue, red and white livery with cabs based on the Class 321 units, and were initially based at Selhurst depot. Although Network SouthEast had shifted to units painted with pale grey, the Class 456s were introduced painted with a darker grey shade to match the livery of the Class 455 units they would be working with. Units were numbered in the range 456001–456024, each unit consisting of a driving motor (DMSO) and a driving trailer (DTSO).

Entry into service for the Class 456 was originally planned for 18 March 1991, with trains to be driver-only operated (without the presence of a guard). This meant that the driver had to have a clear view of the platform with a bank of CCTV monitors mounted at the platform end for this purpose, however it was discovered that the position of the CCTV monitors on the platforms were not visible from the driver's position. To resolve this Selhurst depot designed a replacement fixing for the driver's seat so that it could slide sideways, allowing a good view of the CCTV units. The modified drivers' seats were installed at Fratton Depot with the work completed by the end of July 1991, and services with the new units commenced in September 1991.

== Operations ==
=== Connex South Central and SouthCentral/Southern ===
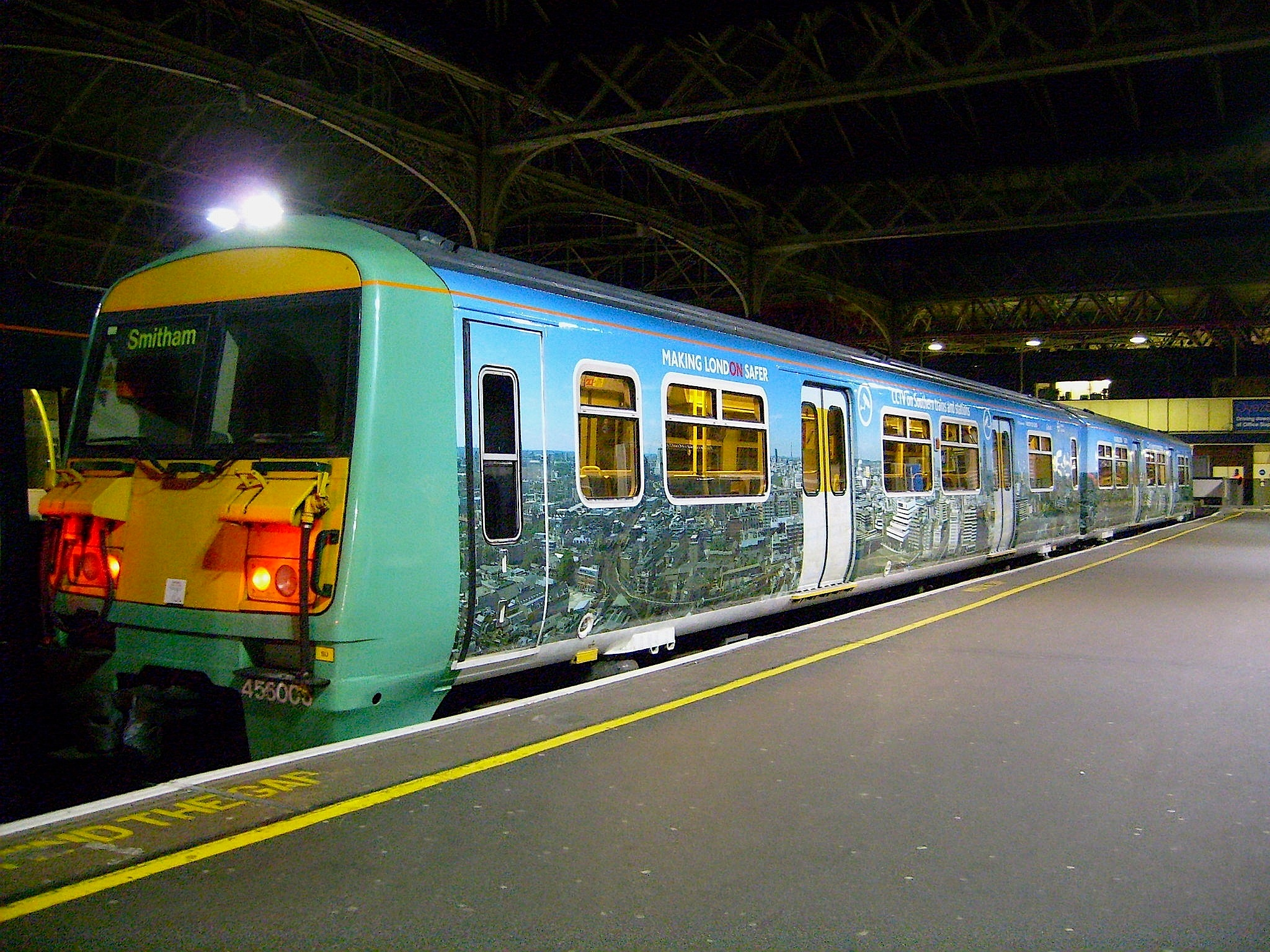
Southern Metro Class 456 at London Bridge

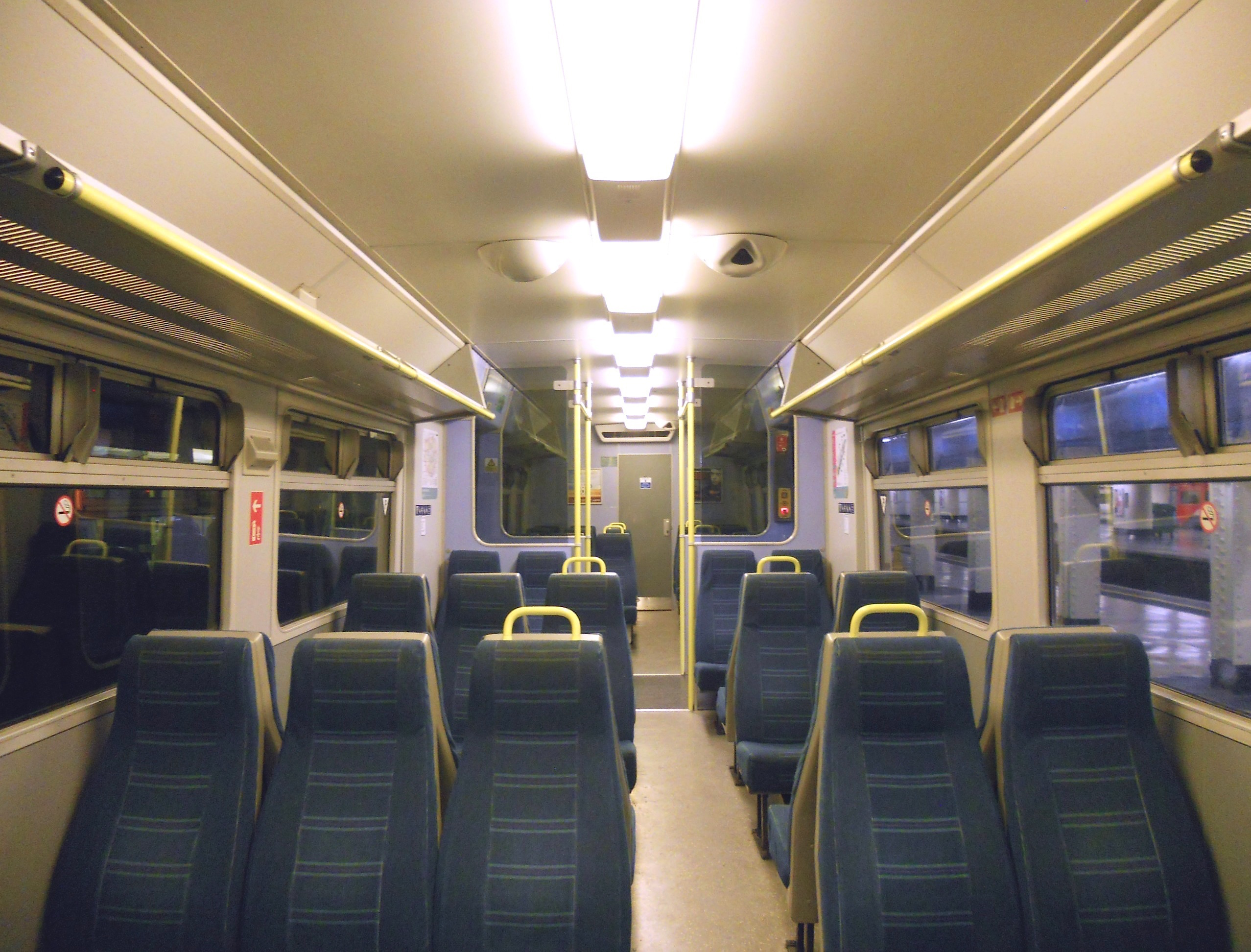
The interior of a Southern refreshed Class 456

When Britain's railways were privatised, the entire Class 456 fleet passed into the South Central franchise (later known as the Southern franchise), which was originally won by Connex South Central. Only one unit, No. 456024, was repainted in white and yellow Connex livery, when it was named Sir Cosmo Bonsor after a chairman of the South Eastern Railway. The rest of the fleet had remained in Network South East livery until summer 2006, when the fleet started to be repainted into Southern livery.

In 2000, Connex lost the South Central franchise to the Go-Ahead Group, who rebranded the company as Southern in 2004.

On 8 May 2012 it was announced by the Department for Transport that the entire fleet of 24 2-car Class 456s would transfer to South West Trains (SWT) in 2014, to be used in conjunction with South West Trains’s Class 455 fleet on London inner-suburban lines.

The Southern services on the South London Line were withdrawn in 2012 and replaced by a new London Overground service, the East London Line, operated using new air-conditioned 5-car Class 378 units. Southern also received 26 new 5 car Class 377/6 units and these entered service at the end of 2013, in place of 92 cascaded carriages promised for extra capacity. This gives a total of 50 replacement carriages in addition to the 92 carriages for extra capacity, leaving the 48 Class 456 carriages surplus to requirements at Southern.

=== South West Trains and South Western Railway ===
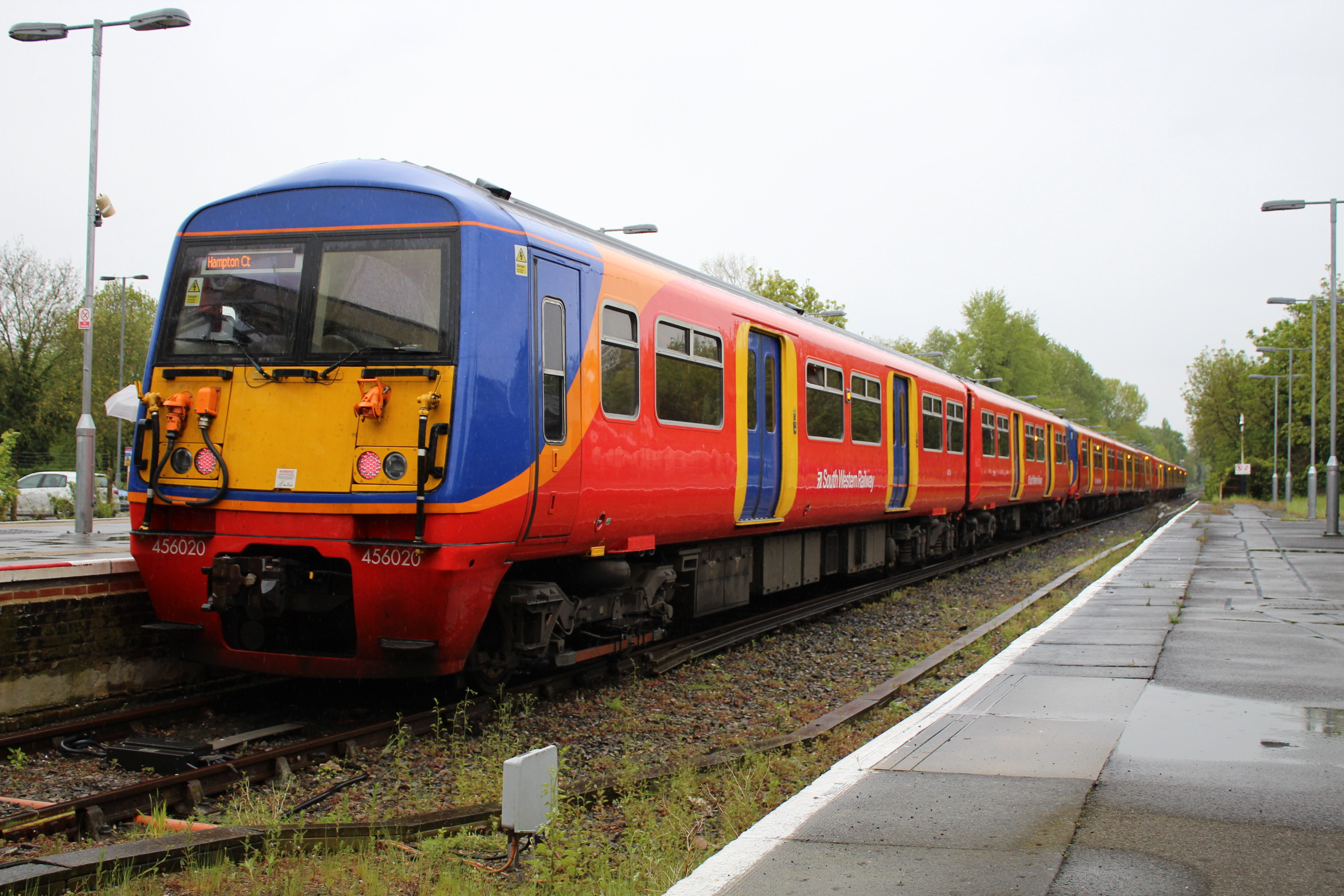
South Western Railway Class 456 at Hampton Court

The units transferred to South West Trains following their career with Southern, as their operations on its Metro routes were replaced by the class 455s, later to be replaced by the class 377/6 units. South West Trains used the 456s to enhance peak-hour Metro services through Wimbledon from 8 to 10 coaches and to provide two additional morning peak services from Raynes Park to Waterloo. These changes took place from December 2014.

Class 456s were repainted in the red "Metro" version of South West Trains livery to match the Class 455 and were refurbished to have a similar interior to the Class 455 before entering service between March 2014 and December 2014. On their transfer, their standard traction equipment was retained, leaving them as the only fleet on South West Trains to be powered by conventional DC traction gear.

The first units entered service with South West Trains on 23 March 2014 between Ascot and Guildford, replacing Class 458 trains with toilets and air conditioning. They initially ran in pairs (i.e. 2 x 2 car) still in Southern's green livery, but without fleet names. 10 units were required to provide the half-hourly service. The one train per day from Clapham Junction (07:45) to Guildford via Ascot was also operated by two 456s, but the trains that ran through to Waterloo during the peak periods continued to be operated by Class 458 trains. The Class 456 trains were the main units on the line for a short time, but were subsequently replaced by Class 450 sets.

All units were refurbished by South West Trains.

In August 2017, all 456 units transferred to the new South Western franchisee, South Western Railway. South Western Railway subsequently withdrew the Class 456 fleet from service on 17 January 2022.

== Refurbishment ==
In March 2005, No. 456006 was hauled to Wolverton where it was studied for corrosion assessment. This caused some doubt as to whether they would be refurbished. However, in a statement in April 2006 Southern said the class would receive a 'refresh', which meant they would not receive a refurbishment as major as the 455s, since the 456s are 10 years newer and already have high-backed seats (although of a different design). Also, new CCTV cameras and flooring were installed; this was not mentioned on the original refurbishment plan.

All units were instead 'refreshed' and were painted into Southern green colours. No. 456006 was completed in a one-off promotional livery for rail safety on the Southern network. 456013 had an experimental cab-cooling system installed and 456022 had some experimental air-conditioning fitted, in an effort to make drivers' jobs more comfortable.

Southern removed the toilets from the trains, to provide more capacity. Despite this the Class 456 EMU trains lost two seats from each pair, due to a space being cleared for wheelchairs and pushchairs.

After the units transferred to South West Trains, a full refurbishment commenced in Wolverton where Class 456s received a new exterior livery and also a refurbished interior with new seating.

== Accidents and incidents ==
- On 15 August 2017, unit 456015 was damaged in a collision with an engineers train at Waterloo station, London. The cause was a wiring error in the signalling which meant that a set of points not correctly set was not detected. This was introduced as part of the testing of the temporary changes to the signalling during a major works programme at Waterloo. This allowed the signalling logic to detect that a set of points was correctly set when in reality, the points were mid-way between either of the correct positions. A false proceed signal was shown to the driver when it should not have been possible.

== Fleet details ==
Class	Status	No. Built	Year built	Cars per unit	Unit nos.
Class 456	Scrapped	24	1990–1991	2	456001–456024

=== Named units ===
Unit 456024 was named Sir Cosmo Bonsor.
