= Electro-pneumatic brake system on British railway trains =

The electro-pneumatic brake system on British mainline railway trains was introduced in 1950 and remains the primary braking system for multiple units in service today, although London Transport underground trains had been fitted with EP brakes since the 1920s. The Southern Region of British Railways operated a self-contained fleet of electric multiple units for suburban and middle-distance passenger trains. From 1950, an expansion of the fleet was undertaken and the new build adopted a braking system that was novel in the UK, the electro-pneumatic brake in which compressed air brake operation was controlled electrically by the driver. This was a considerable and successful technical advance, enabling a quicker and more sensitive response to the driver's operation of brake controls.

== Origins ==
From the 1920s, the Southern Railway of the UK and its predecessor companies had adopted electrification and multiple-unit train operation as a solution for dense and intensive passenger service requirements. The fleet prior to World War II used the two-pipe Westinghouse Air Brake system, which was more effective than the generally prevailing vacuum brake then in favour in the UK. However it had disadvantages, chiefly:

- Partial release of a Westinghouse brake application was unresponsive and usually required a full release – which took a considerable time – and then a re-application.
- On a long train the brake force during a brake application was not consistent along the length of the train; the response to the driver's operation of the brake valve varied according to train length and the variation caused longitudinal surging.
- Release after a full application is slow.
- Response to the driver's operation of the brake valve was inconsistent and not self-lapping (that is, the position of the brake control valve set the rate of change of brake force, not the level of the brake force).

== The First EP-fitted units ==
The first Southern units fitted with EP brake could be considered the Bulleid double deck 4-DDs built 1949 (4001 & 4002). The EP brake fitted to this stock was not of the self lapping type and still required the Westinghouse brake as the 'fail to safe' braking as the EP brake fitted was of the 'energise to apply' type, which meant if there was a loss of brake control voltage the EP brake was inoperative. The 4-DDs were based on the earlier 4-SUB but were not operationally compatible with either the 4-SUB or later EPB stock.

Starting in 1950, a large new fleet of suburban multiple units was delivered to a pre-war design and, as well as other technical improvements, they were equipped with the electro-pneumatic brake – universally referred to as "the EP brake". The advance in braking technology dominated the other developments and the designation of the train units was 2-EPB and 4-EPB for the two- and four-car units respectively. The design was successful and a larger fleet of broadly similar design was built and the Kent Coast Line electrification extended the adoption of the EP brake to medium distance passenger operation but still confined to multiple units. (A small fleet of locomotives were built for the Southern Region and had a brake control system fitted that was compatible for interoperability purposes.)

== Westinghouse and EP brake operation ==
The trains had Westinghouse brake equipment and had an electric control system, activating the compressed air brakes on each coach. In normal operation, the driver used the EP system exclusively but it was not fail-safe. If the electrical system failed, the driver merely had to move the brake valve to a further position and the same valve operated the fail-safe Westinghouse system on the train. This was only done in case of failure or emergency.

The Westinghouse system uses air reservoirs on each vehicle and compressed air is released from these reservoirs to the brake cylinders as the pressure in the train pipe is reduced by the driver operating the brake valve. This process causes a mechanical linkage to press the brake blocks against the wheels.

The release of compressed air into the brake cylinders is achieved by triple valves, which are themselves controlled by the pressure of air in the train pipe, a pneumatic pipe running the length of the train. When the driver wishes to make a brake application, he operates the driver's brake valve which releases some air from the train pipe, so operating the triple valves. When the driver wishes to release the brakes, his operation of the driver's brake valve returns compressed air (stored in a cylinder near the driving position) into the train pipe and this moves the triple valve so as to release the air in the brake cylinders to atmosphere, allowing the brake blocks to move clear of the wheels. Although, in multiple-unit operation, the air reservoirs on the vehicles can be relatively quickly charged, the restoration of pressure to the train pipe takes some time as air has to travel physically down the length of the train.

In EP operation, a distributor, performing functions similar to those of the triple valve, is operated directly and instantly by electrical control from the driver's brake valve. The Westinghouse brake cylinders and air reservoirs and pumps are used, so that only the means of transmitting the driver's command is changed.

== Advantages and developments ==
The advantages of the EP system are that:

- The driver's brake valve is self-lapping; the position of the valve activates a specific brake pressure in the brake cylinders and therefore a specific braking rate.
- The distributors are activated instantly and simultaneously, so that there is no longitudinal surging and the response is consistent irrespective of train length.
- Release of a brake application starts instantly in response to the driver's brake valve, throughout the train; and partial release and re-application is possible.

The electrical control system required control cables throughout the length of the train (in addition to the two air pipes for Westinghouse operation) and a jumper cable was provided at each end of every unit for use when two or more units were coupled to run in multiple. In 1950, no electronic control was possible and the system used four conductors in the cable to achieve graduated braking rates.

The EP brake system was greatly appreciated by drivers and was adopted for subsequent builds of rolling stock on the Southern Region of British Railways, including middle-distance passenger stock.

== The next generation ==
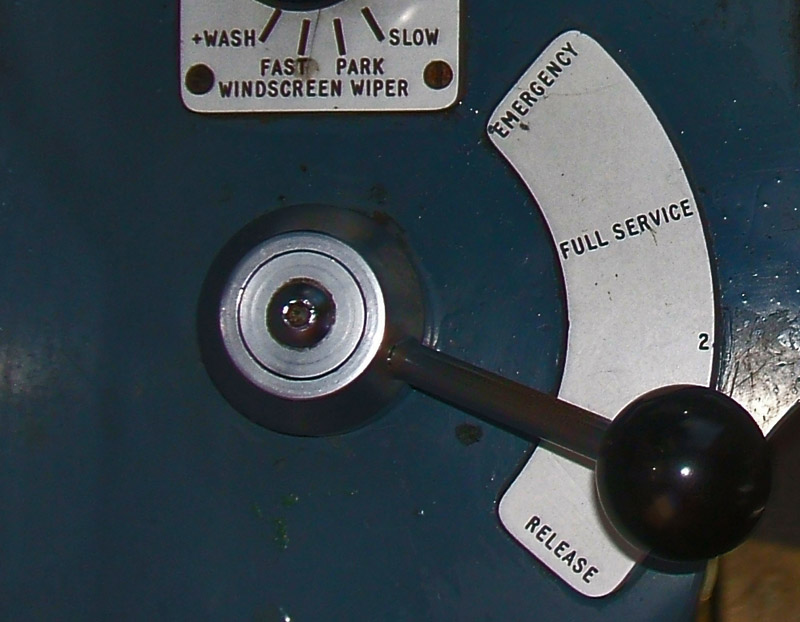
Driver's brake handle on a Class 317 Electric Multiple Unit

Following on from the original EP stock, the system was developed further on the second generation of Multiple Unit trains built for British Rail in the 1970s such as the Class 313 EMU.

The Westinghouse air system was abandoned in favour of a fully electrical system of control, so that the need for a brake pipe and triple-valves was dispensed with. Instead a single air pipe, now called the main reservoir pipe runs the length of the train. It operates at 10 bar and in addition to feeding each brake cylinder reservoir also provides air for the secondary suspension systems (air bags) and power doors.

Each brake reservoir stores air at a pressure of 7 bar and is fed via a pressure reducing valve off the main reservoir pipe. The driver's brake handle passes control voltages down three wires to each EP control valve, which allows air from the brake reservoir to pass into the brake cylinder, thereby activating the disc brake. The presence of the voltage holds the brakes off, providing a fail safe system.

The 3 step "Westcode" brake uses three wires and these operate in a binary sequence to control the brake step. 10 & 11 are the brake coding to provide the 3 steps, 12 wire is emergency brake, 15 wire is EP brake negative.

Positions on the brake handle are:

- Release - trainwires 10,11 and 12 energised
- Step 1 - trainwire 10 de-energised, 11 energised, 12 energised
- Step 2 - trainwire 10 energised, 11 de-energised, 12 energised
- Step 3 - trainwire 10 de-energised, 11 de-energised, 12 energised.
- Emergency - All three trainwires de-energised and earthed

This system remains in use today.

=== Brake continuity wire ===
On the previous EP brake systems, if the train divided or a serious air leak occurred the drop in brake pipe pressure automatically caused the brakes to apply. This feature was lost with the removal of the brake pipe, so an electronic equivalent was created.

The brake continuity wire (a.k.a. trainwire 13) is fed with a 120 V DC control voltage from the battery and runs in a loop round the train, passing through various governors (air pressure operated electrical switches) in each carriage, finally feeding the power and brake control handle(s) in the driver's desk. If any of the governors should open due to low air pressure, or if the Brake Continuity Wire itself should be broken by the train dividing, the control voltage to the driver's desk will be cut off causing traction power to the motors to be removed and the emergency brake to be applied.

== Current use ==
In the UK the most recently built Multiple Units such as the Alstom Aventra family still use friction (disc) brakes which are operated by electro-pneumatic valves for their primary braking system. Additionally dynamic braking is blended with this to achieve a higher braking force and reduce brake pad wear.

== See also ==
- Electropneumatic brake
