= SR Class 2-NOL =

Southern Railway 2-NOL
- In service: 1934 – 1959/60
- Built at: Eastleigh Works
- Constructed: 1934–1936
- Number built: 78 units
- Number scrapped: All
- Formation: 2-car set: DMBT–DTC
- Fleet numbers: Sets: 1813–1890
- Capacity: 24 first class, 135 third class
- Operators: Southern Railway, British Railways

Specifications
- Car body construction: Wooden body on a steel underframe
- Train length: 129 ft 6 in (39.47 m)
- Width: 9 ft 2 in (2.79 m)
- Weight: 70 long tons (71 t; 78 short tons)
- Electric systems: 750 V DC third rail
- Current collection: Contact shoe
- Track gauge: 4 ft 8 1/2 in (1,435 mm)

The Southern Railway (SR) gave the designation 2-NOL to the electric multiple units built during the 1930s from old London and South Western Railway carriage bodies on new underframes. None of these units survived long enough in British Rail ownership to be allocated a TOPS class.

== Construction ==
The 2-NOL (2-car NO Lavatory stock, numbers 1813–1890) units were built in 1934–1936 by taking former LSWR carriage bodies, lengthening them, and placing them on new underframes. They were intended for use on slow services on the South Coast and in South London.

The motor third brakes were produced by taking a 48-foot eight-compartment third (378 of which were built between June 1894 and December 1902 of which 32 were originally 2nd/3rd composites), removing half of one compartment, and adding on a steel-panelled guard's van and a driving cab. The driving trailer composites were also produced from 48-foot eight-compartment thirds, but two whole compartments were removed, and three first-class compartments from a 46-foot six-compartment lavatory first (70 of which were built between 1895 and 1900) were added at one end, and a steel-panelled driving cab at the other.

== Formations ==
Initial formations of these units were as follows (carriages were not necessarily formed in numerical order):

Unit Numbers	DMBT	DTC
1813–1823	9861–9871	9940–9950
1824–1862	9872–9910	9961–9999
1863–1882	8596–8615	9920–9939
1883–1890	9781–9788	9913–9919

== Accidents and incidents ==
- On 2 December 1955, two units of the class formed a passenger train that was in collision with a freight train at Barnes, London due to a signalman's error. A fire broke out due to electrical arcing. Thirteen people were killed and 41 were injured. Unit 1853 was gutted by the fire and was consequently withdrawn.

== Withdrawal ==
Four units were withdrawn between 1941 and 1955. Of these, two units (1828 and 1855) were withdrawn in 1941, one being the result of bomb damage. Two units sustained accidents in 1951, damaging one coach in each unit; but it was possible to form one good unit from the two undamaged coaches, so only one unit (1838) needed to be withdrawn. Unit 1853 withdrawn following an accident at Barnes in December 1955, as detailed above. The majority of these units were withdrawn between 1956 and 1959, when the old bodies were scrapped and the underframes were re-used. Four units (1870/1/7/8) donated their frames to new 4-EPB coaches, but the frames from 70 units were used to construct 34 new 2-EPB and 36 new 2-HAP units. There remained 31 units in stock in the Summer of 1959, but they had all been withdrawn by the end of August 1959.
