= Holgate Road carriage works, York =

Railway carriage works in Yorkshire, England (1884–1996)

Coordinates: 53.9569°N 1.1046°W

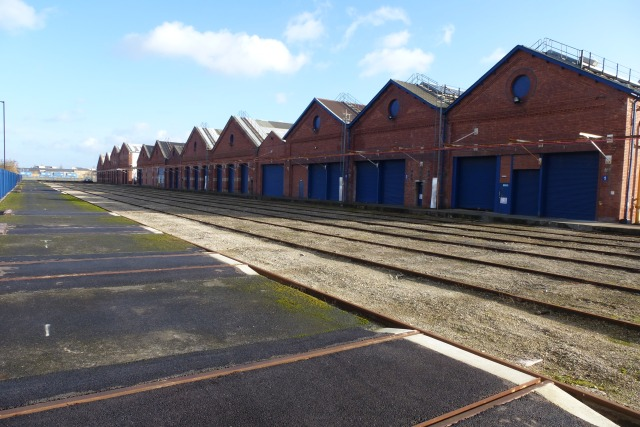
West end of carriage works' 1900 extension, and 1930s traverser (2014)

The Holgate Road carriage works was a railway carriage manufacturing factory in the Holgate area of York, England.

The factory began production in 1884 as a planned expansion and replacement of the North Eastern Railway's Queen Street site; the works was substantially expanded in 1897–1900, and saw further modernisations through the 20th century.

The works passed to the ownership of the London and North Eastern Railway (1923); British Railways (1948); British Rail Engineering Limited, known as BREL York (1970); and privatised and acquired by ABB in 1989 (ABB York).

The works closed in 1996, due to lack of orders caused by uncertainty in the post-privatisation of British Rail period. Thrall Car Manufacturing Company used the works to manufacture freight wagons for English Welsh and Scottish Railway from 1998 to 2002, after which the factory closed again.

As of 2009, the site is in maintenance related rail use by Network Rail as their Rail Fleet Engineering Centre (RFEC). The site is used by Network Rail, and various rail sub-contractors to maintain Network Rail's own fleet of maintenance rail vehicles.

As a consequence of manufacturing work using asbestos during the 20th century more than a hundred people associated from the works have died from illness caused by exposure to the material, with asbestos related illnesses still occurring and causing death into the 21st century.

== History ==
=== NER (1884–1923) ===
After the transfer of wagon building from York Queen Street in 1867, in 1880 the North Eastern Railway took the decision to move carriage building to a new site, and the first contracts let for its construction in 1880. The works was designed as an integrated carriage building factory, with separate buildings for each process. The main buildings were of brick construction, with stone and coloured brick detailing. The internal construction was of cast iron columns with wrought iron beams. Carriage building started in 1884 which construction of 6-wheel carriages and the works started producing bogie coaches, initially of 45 feet (14 m) length, in 1895.

By the late 1890s capacity had been reached, exacerbated by the increase in length of carriages, and from 1897 contracts were let for the construction of expansion of the works, primarily west, plus a large lifting shop adjacent south of the main works building. Electric and gas shops were also added and additional stores, plus servicing and washing sheds to the west. The expansion of buildings was mostly complete by 1900, excluding a wagon (rulley) shop built 1904. A large wood drying store allowed a ready supply of seasoned woods for carriage manufacture.

In 1903 two 53.5 feet (16.3 m), 35 long tons (36 t) Petrol Electric Autocars were built, numbers 3170 and 3171, early examples of electric transmission in rail vehicles; the works produced rolling stock for the North Tyneside electrification in the same period.

In 1914 York carriage works built 3 kitchen-cars for use on the Flying Scotsman, these being of all steel construction - quite advanced for the time - due to being fitted with gas cooking equipment. During the First World War the York works produced material for the war effort, mostly logistics equipment, but other work included conversion of existing carriages into an ambulance train and a complete train which was produced for the Director General of Transportation.

In 1920 the carriage works had 13.5 acres (5.5 ha) of buildings on a site of 45 acres (18 ha). The works built all of the coaching stock of the NER, plus much of the East Coast Joint Stock and Great Northern and North-Eastern Joint Stock, as well as undertaking most of the NER's carriage repairs. The site consisted of two main buildings on the east end of the site; the northernmost one was used for building and painting vehicles, the southern one included the sawmill, frame and cabinet building, machine and brake shops. There were also offices, a smithy and cat shop, and gas and electric shops. West of the main works was a large timber drying building, and carriage washing facilities. The 0.6 acres (0.24 ha) 1871 building was still in use as, mainly as a glass store and paintshop. Overall the carriage works employed 1,500 persons.

=== LNER period (1923–1948) ===
At the start of this period a survey by the LNER showed that York Works had a construction capacity of 200 coaches per year and to improve capacity the varnishing shop was converted to provide extra build capacity in 1924. The London and North Eastern Railway (LNER) added traversers (c. 1930s) at the west and east end of the main works building on the south side; to accommodate the east traverser the buildings were shortened. By this time York had moved to 'sectionalised assembly' and this methodology, having some similarities to a production line, was expanded in 1931 under A. H. Peppercorn.

During the Second World War the carriage works produced parts for Horsa Gliders and in 1944 part of the north building (building shop) which had been manufacturing launches for the Royal Navy was destroyed by an accidental fire. The building was rebuilt with a new roof with clerestory lighting, being reopened in 1947. During the war period time many of the workers were women, who worked shifts up to 69 hours in a week.

=== BR period (1948–1989) ===
At nationalisation (see Transport Act 1947) the works employed around 5,000 people.

During the 1950s there were over 3,000 staff employed by the works and early Diesel Multiple Units were maintained on the site. Some early Electric Multiple Unit trains were built at York, such as British Rail Class 305/1.

In the 1960s the BR workshops were re-organised : regional workshops were abolished and control centralised with excess works closing. York, together with Derby was retained and assigned to carriage production, and £976,000 authorised for investment at the site.

In 1970 the rolling stock workshops division of British Rail (excluding repair works) became British Rail Engineering Limited (BREL).

From the 1970s to 1989 the works manufactured much of British Rail's electric multiple unit passenger stock, including: Class 313 (64 three car trains, 1976/7); Class 314 (16 three car trains, 1979); Class 315 (61 four car, 1980/1); Class 317 (72 four car, 1981-2 & 1985–7); Class 319 (86 four car, 1987–1990); Class 318 (21 three car, 1984–1986);,Class 321 (117 four car, 1988–1991). and Class 455 (137 four car, 1982–4). The works continued producing vehicles for British Rail after privatisation. Class 150 DMUs were built, and Class 165 and Class 166 DMUs.

BREL introduced some modern manufacturing methods at the works, installations included: five sheet metal machining centres, one with an automatic tool change, used to manufacture body shells and bolster parts for EMUs; test facilities for air-conditioning units; and clean rooms for electronics repair. The works also had a short test track electrified at 750 V DC or 25 kV AC. Experiments were carried out into robotic welding machines in the early 1980s, but the technique was not used for production at that time.

=== Post-privatisation (1989–) ===
BREL was privatised in 1987, as BREL (1988) Ltd., and acquired by a consortium including management, Trafalgar House and ABB acquired the company including the York works in 1989. Procurement contracts on British Rail began being put to public tender in the 1980s; the fate of the works was linked primarily to the number of orders for Network SouthEast for electric passenger stock – failure to win the contract for electric multiple units for the Heathrow Express service (awarded to Siemens/CAF, see Class 332) resulted in the loss of 289 jobs.

The works obtained contracts to build: Class 320 (22 three car, 1990); Class 322 (5 four car, 1990); Class 365 (41 four car, 1994/5); Class 456 (24 two car. 1991–92) and Class 465 (97 four car, 1991–1994). Additionally Eurotrams were built for the Strasbourg tramways at the site, and at ABB's Derby Litchurch Lane works c. 1994–95.

In 1995 ABB announced that the factory would close due to lack of orders; the cause was widely recognised as being due to a gap in train orders caused by uncertainties following the privatisation of British Rail: Union officials, ABB management, and Conservative and Labour members of parliament all expressed similar views on the cause of the closure. The carriage works closed in 1996 with 750 redundancies; ABB blamed the closure on the privatisation of British Rail, stating that the privatisation had delayed orders, causing a gap in the company's order books.

Wagon manufacturer Thrall (USA) reopened the plant as wagon works in 1997, having obtained about a £200 million order from EWS for 2,500 wagons. First production was the BYA type covered steel coil carriers. The first wagon was formally presented in July 1998. Nearly half of the order was for 1145 HTA coal hoppers. Other wagon types produced included 300 MBA 'monster box', 260 BYA (covered steel coil), 100+400+300 FAA; FCA and FKA container flat wagons, and 60 BRA steel wagons. Prototype MRA ballast wagons were also manufactured for Railtrack at the site c. 2000.

No further orders were received, and in 2002 the factory was closed by Thrall successor Trinity Industries with 260 redundancies.

Network Rail acquired the main building in 2009 for storage and maintenance of Rail Head Treatment Train wagons.

== Legacy ==
=== Asbestos contamination ===
Asbestos was used in rolling stock manufacture as thermal and sound insulation. In carriages, asbestos would be applied between inner and outer bodywork layers as well as in flooring and radiator insulation. After the beginning of the British Rail Modernisation Plan in the 1950s blue asbestos came into increasing use, until its health dangers were recognised.

In 1975 an inquest into the death of former railway worker Frank Summers recorded that he had died from an industrial disease; he had previously been employed in asbestos spraying at York Carriage works. At the inquest it was claimed that the use of asbestos at the works ended in 1964; initially the dangers of asbestos were not known and employees worked without facemasks or other protection; workers continued to be exposed to asbestos into the 1970s, relatives of workers also developed asbestos related diseases through contact with dust on workers' clothing.

Many scores of former York Carriageworks employees have died over the last two or three decades from exposure to deadly asbestos dust at the Holgate Road factory in the 1950s, 60s, 70s and even 80s.

— The Press, May 2008.

The Holgate Road site was still contaminated with asbestos in some areas in the 1990s. By 2012 it was estimated that over 141 workers had died as a result of exposure to asbestos.

=== Buildings ===
Most of the buildings auxiliary to the main works have been demolished post closure. West of the main works the area was cleared and partially developed for housing, and the gas and electric shops were demolished; the stores building in the northeast corner was reused as a small business premises.
