= British Rail Class 416 =

Class of British electric multiple unit

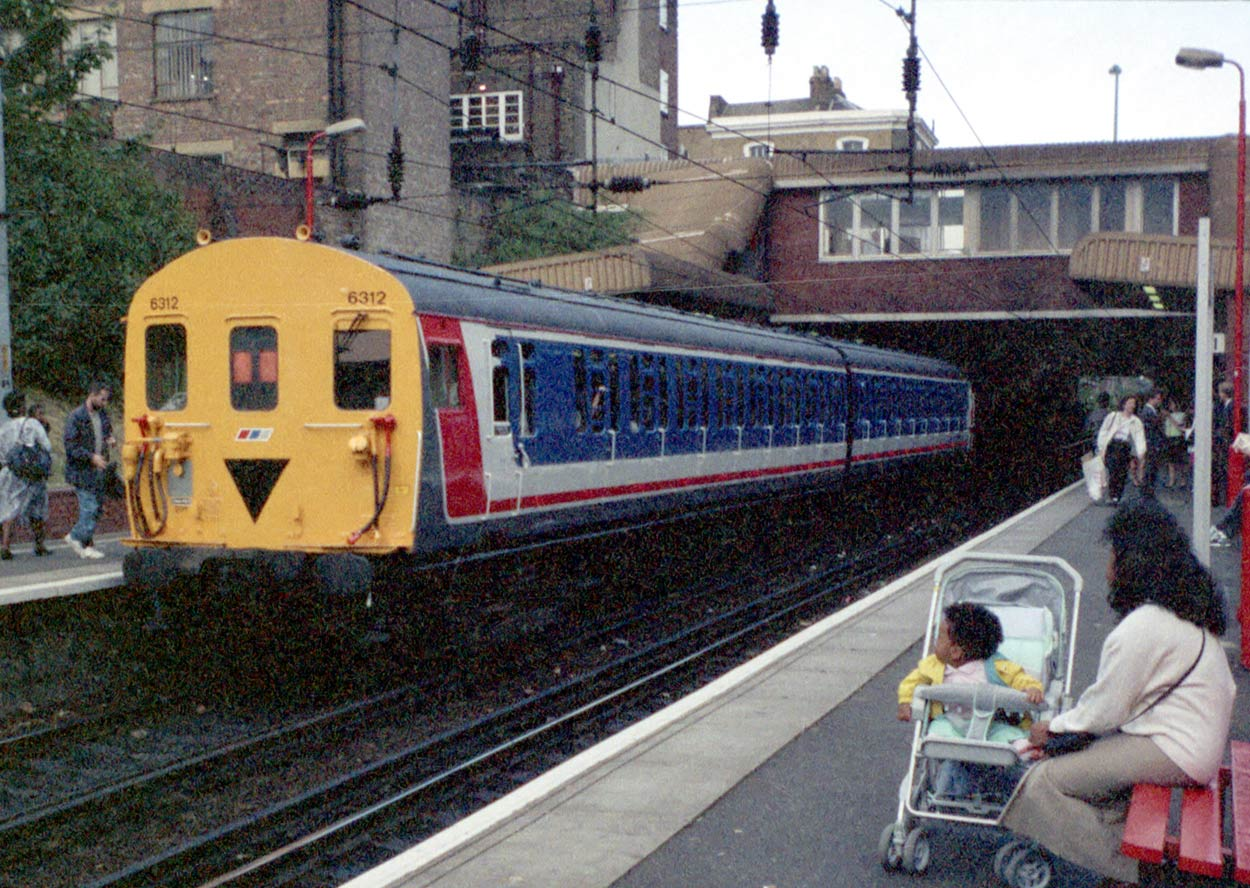
- Network SouthEast 6312 at Dalston Kingsland
- In service: 1955-1995
- Manufacturers: Ashford Works, Eastleigh works & Lancing works
- Number built: 128
- Formation: DMBS-DTS or DMBS-DTC
- Operator: British Rail

Specifications
- Car length: 19.50 m (63 ft 11 3/4 in)
- Maximum speed: 75 mph (121 km/h)
- Weight: DMBS 40 long tons (41 t) DTS 30 long tons (30 t) DTC 30 long tons (30 t)
- Traction motors: Two
- Power output: 2 x 250 hp (190 kW) total 500 hp (370 kW)
- Electric system: 660-750 V DC third rail
- Current collection: Contact shoe
- Track gauge: 4 ft 8 1/2 in (1,435 mm) standard gauge

The British Rail Class 416 (2-EPB) third-rail electric multiple units (EMUs) were built by Ashford Works, Eastleigh works & Lancing works and were in service between 1953 and 1995. They were intended for inner suburban passenger services on London's Southern Electric network. There were two subclasses of Class 416: Class 416/1 to an SR design on salvaged 2-NOL underframes, built between 1953 and 1956, and Class 416/2 based on a British Railways Mark 1 coach design.

In the 1980s some 2 EPB units were used on the North London Line between Richmond and North Woolwich; these units were equipped with window bars.

== Tyneside units ==
Fifteen units built in 1954/5 to the BR Mark I coach design were built for the third rail electrified Tyneside Electric lines.

They were built at Eastleigh Works, and were the last Tyneside third rail EMUs built. They followed the new British Railways standard design for suburban rolling stock: similar units were built at the same time for use on South London suburban routes, but the Tyneside units had features in keeping with previous Tyneside EMUs, such as a large brake van to accommodate a large volume of fish boxes and prams; electric headcode lights on the cab front between the windows; and above those a roller destination blind. Unlike units of this style built for service in the south, the Tyneside units had a single first class compartment.

Another unit, 5800, was built in 1959 in order to replace the destroyed 5766. Unit 5800 had some differences. It was disbanded in 1964.

The units operated the South Tyneside services between Newcastle Central and South Shields, a route that had a busy commuter frequency and passenger numbers to match. British Railways decided to withdraw electric traction from these routes and the South Tyneside route was the first to be replaced by diesel units, being de-electrified in 1963. All 15 units were re-allocated to South London, Kent, Surrey and Berkshire, which entailed some rebuilding of the cabs and the declassification of the first class compartment. The units continued in passenger service until 1985 when they were all withdrawn.

A number of units survived for a few years longer on non-passenger duties as test or tractor units. One was used for testing the Tonbridge - Hastings line electrification before the route was opened for electric trains in the summer of 1986 by British Rail. This unit also carried out similar work on the East Grinstead electrification two years later and saw occasional use on other test and tractor duties until laid up in 1995. It was purchased for preservation by SERA and was moved to Robertsbridge in Sussex for initial restoration work, and moved to the Electric Railway Museum, Warwickshire in 1999. Two DMBS from two different units (5783 and 5790) were rebuilt as departmental set 026 (later 931062), with roller shutter doors on each side and tanks inside to carry carriage cleaning fluid and de-icing fluid between the supply point and depots. This unit, nicknamed The Sprinkler, was in service from 1987 until 2002 and was the last Tyneside unit in use, albeit heavily modified from original form.

== Rebuilds ==
The 416/1 subclass (5651–5684) was rebuilt at Eastleigh Works in 1959 using underframes from withdrawn SR Class 2NOL units. The rebuilt units were initially classified 2 NOP but later absorbed into the 2 EPB classification. They had SR-designed bodies, similar to those of the earlier SR-design 4 SUB units and Bulleid locomotive-hauled coaching stock.

With the introduction of yellow warning panels from late 1963 the motor coaches of all Southern Region 2 and 3-car units were equipped with an inverted black triangle in order to provide an early visual indication to station staff that there was no brake van at the other end of the unit. This distinguished them from 4-EPB units, which had a brake van at each end of the 4-car set unit so were not so marked.

== Electrical equipment ==
Each motor car had two 250 horsepower English Electric EE507 traction motors.

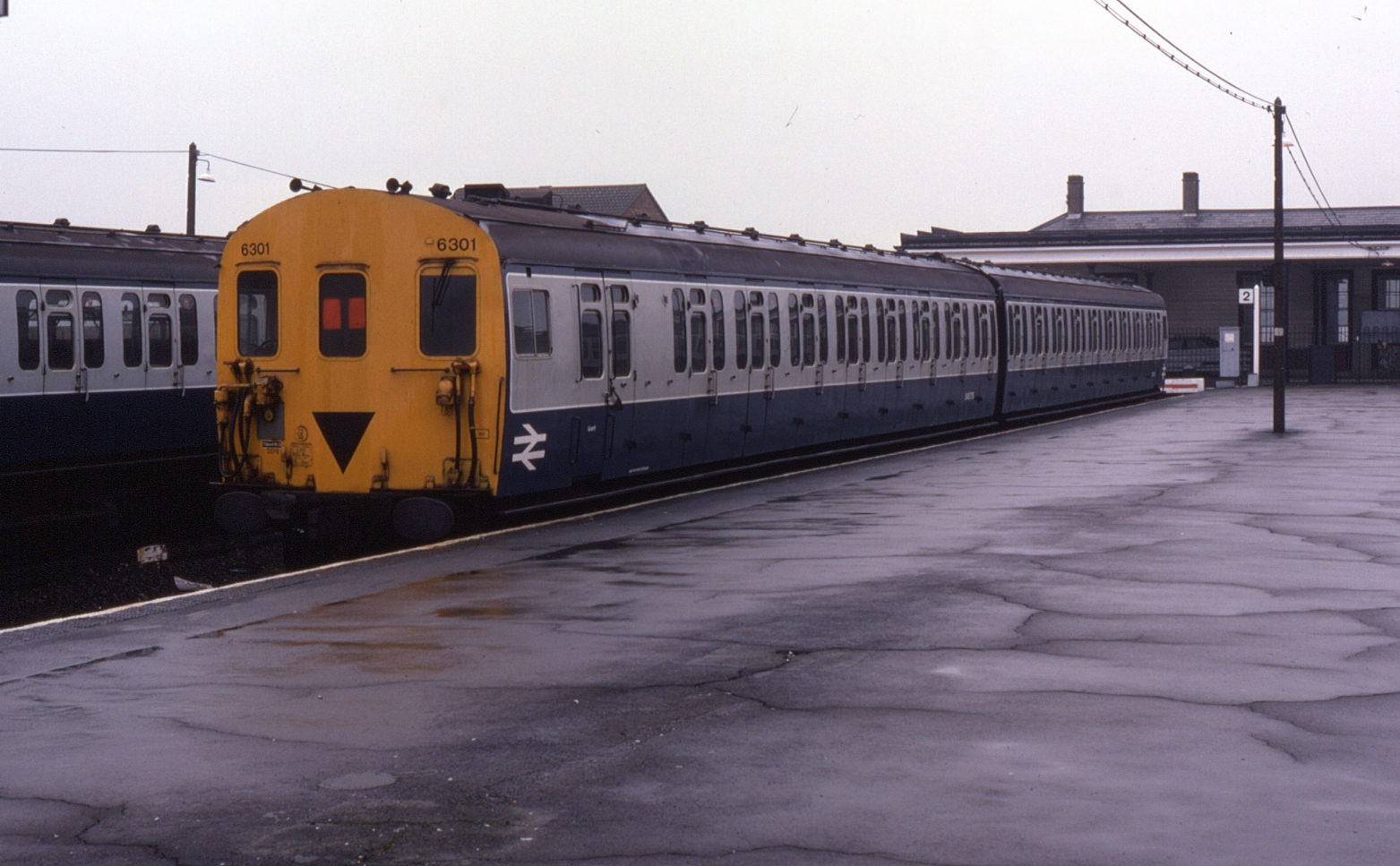
A Class 416 at Tattenham Corner in 1984.

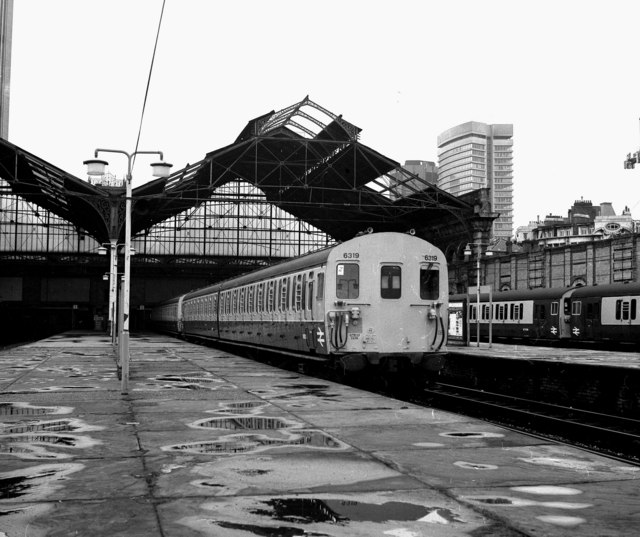
Class 416 train at Broad Street station in 1985.

== Numbering ==
=== Unit numbers ===
- Class 416/1 Rebuilds, 5651-5684 (These units were refurbished from 1983 and were reclassified 416/3 with units numbered 6301 - 6334)
- Class 416/2 Standard BR MK 1-TYPE stock, 5701-5779 (subsequently renumbered 6202 - 6279 from 1983), and the former Tyneside units, 5781 - 5795 (later 6281 - 6295; these units were withdrawn in 1985).
- Class 416/4. Created from 1986 after some units were refurbished. These were numbered 6401 - 6426.

=== Car numbers ===
- Tyneside stock:
  - Motor cars, E65311-E65325
  - Trailer cars, E77100-E77114

== Accidents and incidents ==
- On 4 December 1957 both cars of unit 5766 were damaged beyond repair in the Lewisham collision.
- On 9 January 1991, unit 6227 was part of the train formed with 4EPB units 5618 and 5484 which ran into the buffer stop at Cannon Street station, London. Two people were killed and 277 were injured.

== Preservation ==
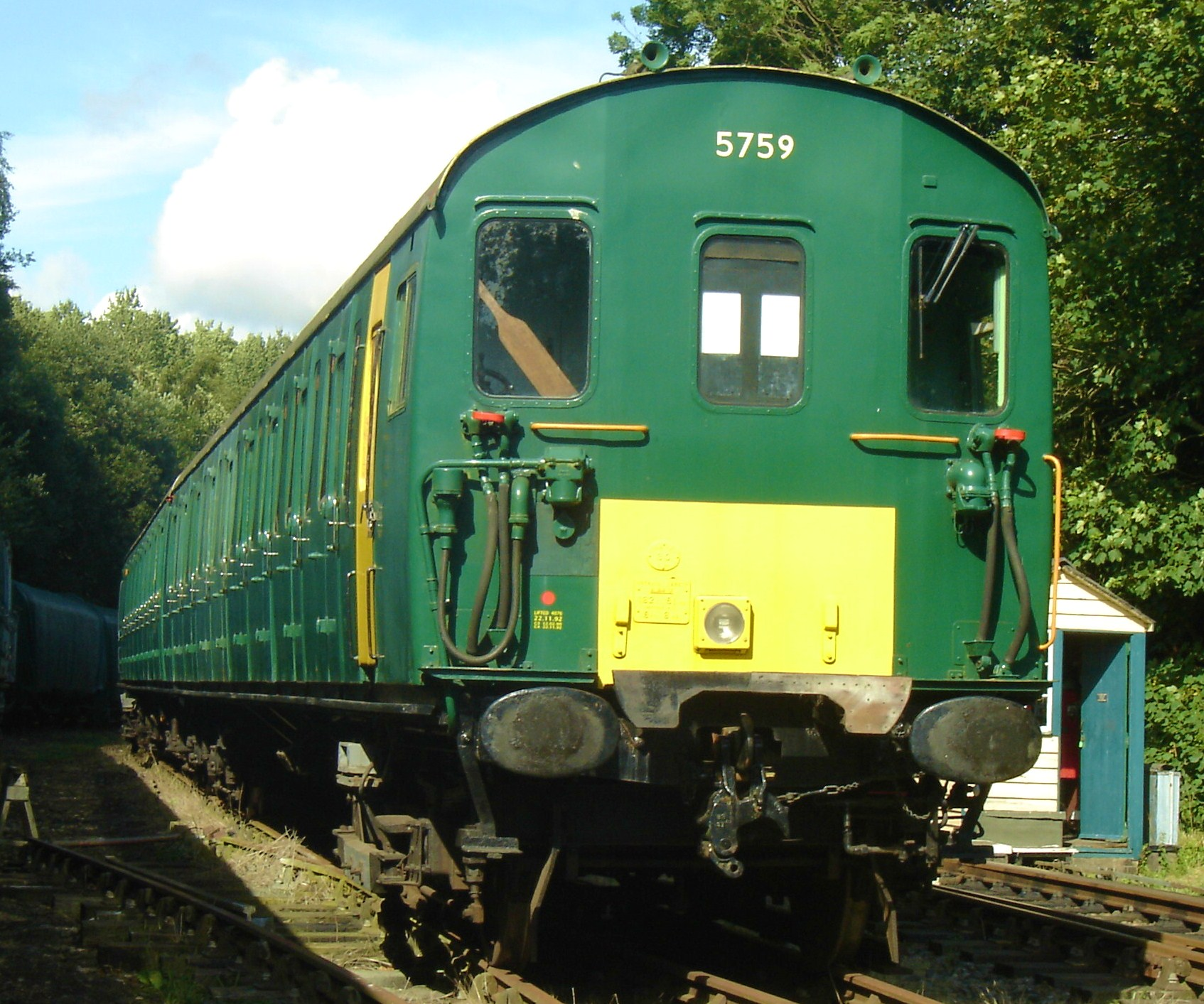
Preserved 2 EPB 5759

The final units were withdrawn in 1995. Five units have been preserved, including an ex-Tyneside unit.

Unit number (current in bold)			DMBSO	DTSso	Built	Livery	Location
5667	**6307**	-	14573	16117	1959 Eastleigh	Canvas by Rumah & Crom	Private site, Sellindge, Kent
**5759**	6259	-	65373	77558	1956 Eastleigh	BR Green	Southall Depot, West London
**5791**	6291	932053	65321	-	1955 Eastleigh	Green primer / Blue grey	Battlefield Line Railway
**5793**	6293	932053	-	77112	1955 Eastleigh	Green primer / Blue grey	Battlefield Line Railway
**5703**	6203	930032/930204	65302	-	1955 Eastleigh	BR Green	MoD Bicester
**5705**	6205	930032/930205	65304	-	1955 Eastleigh	BR Green	Nemesis Rail, Burton-on-Trent

== Modelling ==
Bachmann Industries has released an 00 gauge model of a BR-design 2 EPB (416/2) in late 2011, in several liveries.
