= SR Class 4-SUB =

Class of British electric multiple units

Southern Railway 4-SUB British Rail Class 405
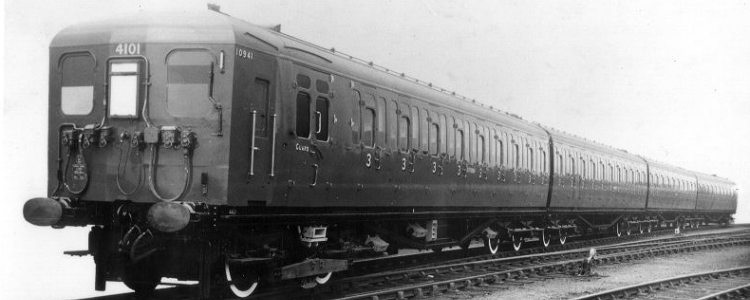
- 4101 (prototype) in 1941
- In service: 1941-1983
- Manufacturer: Eastleigh Works
- Constructed: 1941-1951
- Number built: 185 units
- Number preserved: 1 unit
- Formation: DMBSO-TS-TSO-DMBSO
- Capacity: 368 - 386 Seats
- Operators: Southern Railway; British Railways
- Depot: Wimbledon Traincare Depot (London)

Specifications
- Car length: DMBSO: 62 ft 6 in (19.05 m); TS & TSO: 62 ft (18.90 m)
- Width: 9 ft (2.74 m)
- Maximum speed: 75 mph (121 km/h)
- Weight: 134 long tons (136 t; 150 short tons)
- Traction motors: Four
- Power output: Early units: 4 x 275 hp (205 kW) total 1,100 hp (820 kW); Later units: 4 x 250 hp (190 kW) total 1,000 hp (750 kW)
- Current collection: Contact shoe
- Braking system: Air (Westinghouse)

The Southern Railway (SR) and the British Railways (Southern Region) (BR(S)) used the designation SUB to cover a wide variety of electric multiple-unit passenger trains that were used on inner-suburban workings in the South London area. The designation 'Sub' was first officially used in 1941 to refer to newly built 4-car units. However, during the 1940s large numbers of earlier '3-Car Suburban Sets' were increased to four cars by the addition of an 'Augmentation' trailer, and became part of the 4-SUB category. The SR and BR (S) continued to build or else rebuild 4-car units to slightly different designs which became part of the 4-SUB Class. Many of these later examples survived in passenger use until late 1983, by which time British Rail had allocated to them TOPS Class 405.

== History ==
=== 3-Car Suburban Sets ===
In 1923, the Southern Railway inherited 84 3-car suburban electric multiple units from the London and South Western Railway (LSWR), dating from 1914. These could be enhanced by 24 2-car trailer sets coupled between two units, creating 8-car formations. Over the next 18 years the SR acquired a further 516 3-car sets. These were either new; rebuilt from steam stock inherited from the LSWR, the London, Brighton and South Coast Railway (LBSCR) and the South Eastern and Chatham Railway; or rebuilt from LBSCR AC multiple units. Some rebuilt units had ‘torpedo style’ front ends, others had the newer, flatter, front ends used on the main-line stock introduced during the early 1930s. They were designated ‘3-Car Suburban Sets’ to differentiate them from main-line units, and were numbered between 1201 and 1800. They are sometimes referred to as ‘3-SUB units’, but this designation does not appear to have been used whilst they were in use.

The 3-car units ultimately proved to be inadequate for most trains and inconvenient as the trailer sets had no driving cabs and so had to be marshaled between two 3-car units. Therefore, many were augmented by the addition of a new trailer car and rebuilt as 4-SUB units between 1942 and 1948. The remainder of the 3-car units were withdrawn. The last 2-car trailer set was withdrawn in September 1948, and the last 3-car formation ran in 1949.

=== 4-SUB Units ===
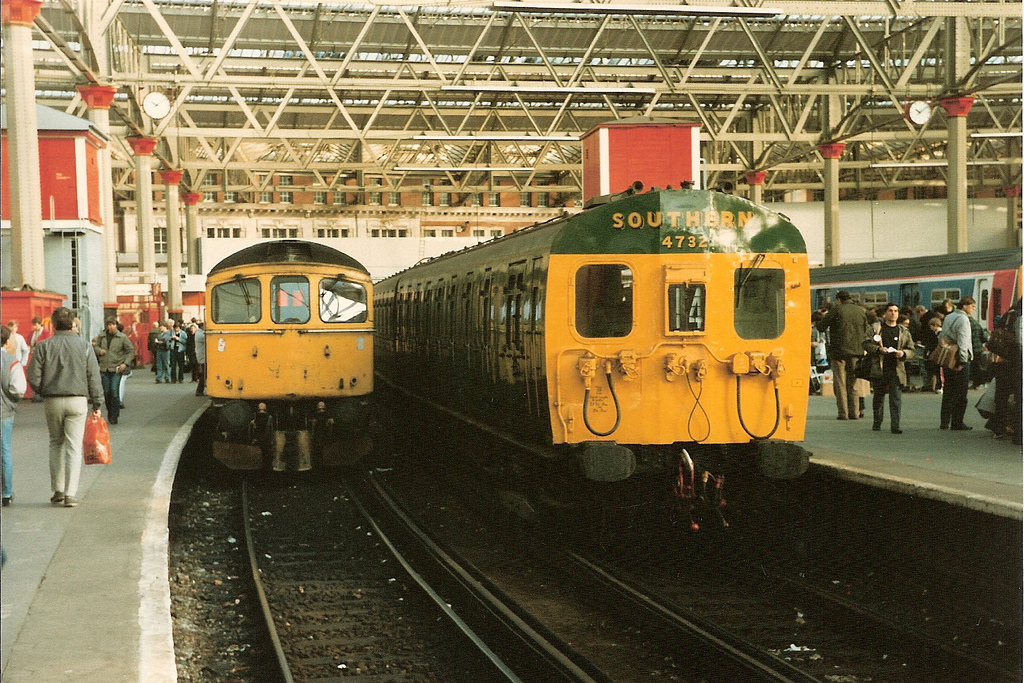
Preserved 4-SUB unit 4732 with vertical ‘slab’ front end

In 1939, following the appointment of Oliver Bulleid as Chief Mechanical Engineer, the SR announced a new welded steel 4-car suburban unit with curved sides, seating six passengers across rather than the normal five. The prototype unit, 4101, was not completed until 1941 due to the advent of the Second World War. As built, this had composite (both First Class and Third Class) seating accommodation in one trailer car and domed cab roofs, but because first-class accommodation in the London suburban area was withdrawn in October 1941, the six first-class compartments were declassified to third-class before the unit was placed in service. A further nine units were built in 1944-5 with Third Class accommodation only. Twenty units were introduced from 1946 with a vertical, ‘slab’ front end, and Third Class accommodation only. The underframes were built at Lancing Carriage Works and the bodies at Eastleigh Works.

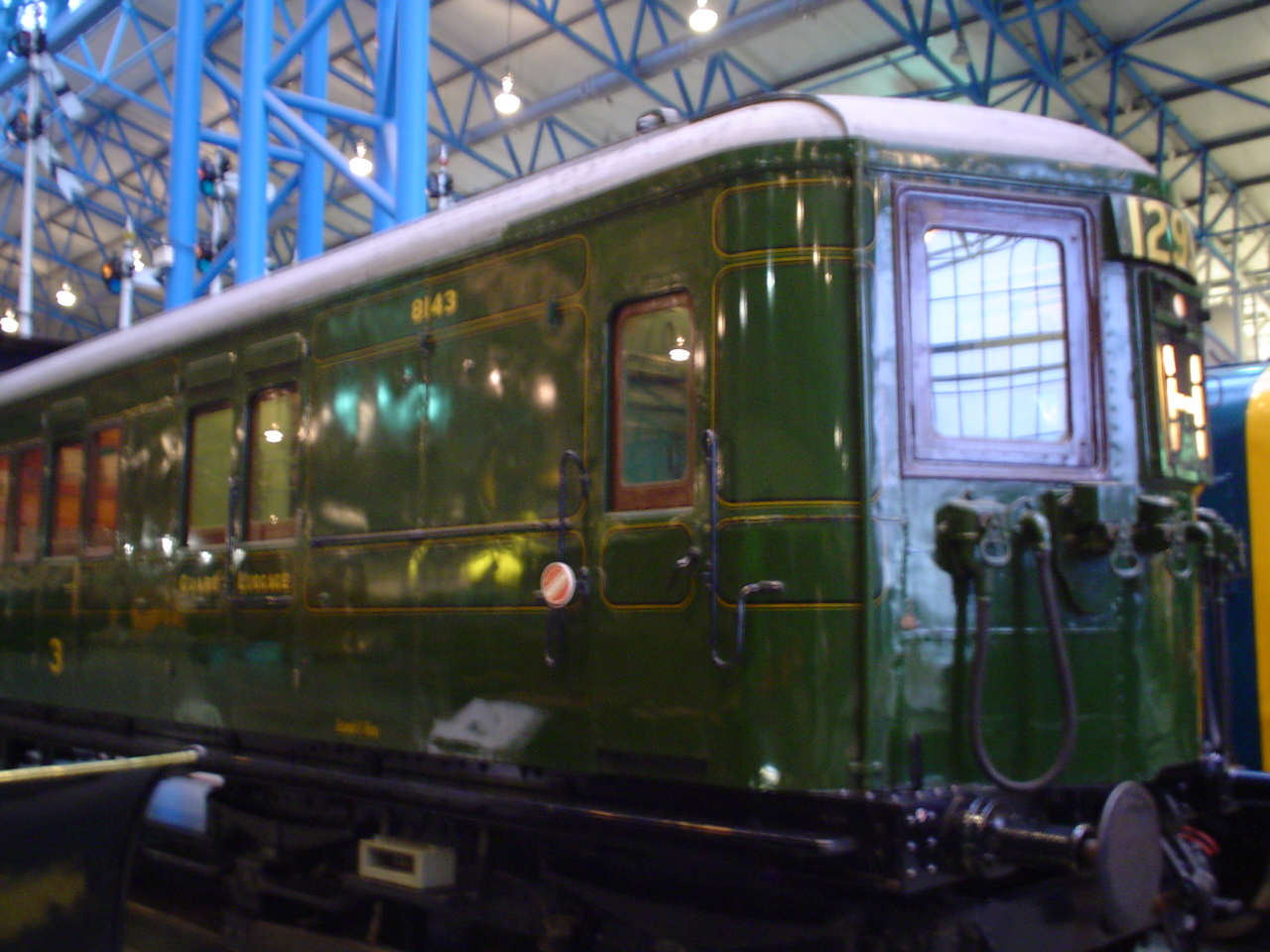
Rebuilt 4-SUB Motor Car with ‘torpedo’ style front.

As mentioned above, between 1942 and 1948 many 3-Car Suburban Sets were rebuilt and enhanced by the addition of a new 'Augmentation' trailer car to create 4-SUB units. This was done by inserting new steel trailers rather than one of the existing trailer cars. The rebuilt units were renumbered between 4131 and 4249.

BR(S) continued to introduce 4-SUB units, both new and converted from existing units, until 1951.

== Formations ==
The usual formation for the newly built units was to have a Driving Motor Brake Third (DMBT) car at each ends, with accommodation for 108 passengers in nine compartments, together with two Trailer Third (TT) cars between with ten or eleven compartments giving a total passenger accommodation for 456 in all four coaches. After the renaming of 'Third Class' to 'Second Class' in 1956 these became DMBS and TS respectively.) However some of the rebuilds had Trailer Composite (TC) cars. The earlier coaches provided compartments, whereas the post war newly built carriages tended to provide saloon or semi-saloon style accommodation to allow for more standing room. These new 'open' carriages were designated DMBTO or TTO.

The 3-car suburban units had included a proportion of first-class accommodation, usually seven first-class compartments providing 56 seats together with 18 third-class compartments seating 180. Normally, all of the first-class compartments would be in the central car, this being a trailer composite, although some units had two or three of the seven first-class compartments in one of the end cars, this being a motor composite brake. The new 4-SUB units were also designed to include first-class accommodation, the first ten units (nos. 4101–10) being built with two nine-compartment motor third brakes, one eleven-compartment trailer third, and one ten-compartment trailer composite having six first-class compartments in the middle, flanked by two third-class at each end. First-class compartments seated ten each, third-class compartments twelve, for a capacity of 60 first- and 396 third-class. Before unit 4101 could enter service, first-class was suspended for the duration of the war (never being reinstated); the first-class compartments of no. 4101 were redesignated third-class, and the unit now provided 468 third-class seats. The remaining nine units of the first batch, nos. 4102–10, which were not built until 1944–45 were entirely third-class from the outset, with seating capacity similar to no. 4101. Units built subsequently had one fewer compartment in each car, giving a total capacity of 420 third-class seats in units 4111–20.

== Operation ==
Throughout their careers the 4-SUB units were used on the London suburban services of all three divisions of BR (S).

179 out of the 184 new units constructed between 1946 and 1951 were still surviving at the introduction of the TOPS computer system in the early 1970s but were expected to have limited working lives. Under TOPS all surviving units were allocated to Class 405, but divided into two sub-classes. Sub-class 405/1 included the former Southern Railway sets numbered between 4112 and 4387, and sub-class 405/2 included the former British Railways sets built after 1949 and numbered between 4601 and 4754. All had been withdrawn by 1983.

As withdrawals reduced the number of units, services were concentrated in certain areas so that by 1981 units working on the Central section were allocated to Selhurst Depot and were concentrated on London Bridge to East Croydon services, and on peak-time commuter services to/from Holborn Viaduct and Blackfriars. Units on the South Western section were allocated to Wimbledon Depot and were concentrated on services between Waterloo and Effingham Junction, Shepperton or Chessington, although all of the scheduled services were on weekdays.

== Withdrawal ==
The rebuilt units began to be withdrawn in the late 1950s and all had been withdrawn by the end of the 1960s. Apart from a few accident damaged units, the newly built units began to be withdrawn in 1972, and had all been withdrawn by 1983. Those units surviving in the early 1970s were designated as Class 405 under the TOPS computer system.

=== Departmental use ===
In 1972 a unit was converted for use transporting stores between Eastleigh Works and various Southern Region depots. Renumbered 024 the unit was based at Slade Green and followed a set route on a weekly schedule serving Stewarts Lane, Ashford, Hither Green, Slade Green and Selhurst.

In 1974 unit 4367 was retired from revenue-earning service and converted for use as a mobile instruction train and was allocated to Ashford Depot. As part of the conversion the unit was renumbered 055.

After withdrawal, some individual steel-bodied trailer vehicles were adapted for use in de-icing the third rail and were fitted with spraying and scraping equipment. These vehicles were renumbered ADS70050/1 and ADS70086/7 and were used in conjunction with stock having Electro-Pneumatic controls. In 1977 some additional conversions for de-icing were made when 6 new 2-car units were created from 4-SUB Motor Brake vehicles. These were renumbered 004 - 009.

== Preservation ==
A handful of SUB stock carriages have survived in preservation, thus:

- Driving Motor car number 8143 (formerly of SUB unit 1293, later 4-SUB 4308) is in the care of the National Railway Museum, York.
- 4-SUB unit number 4732, formed of DMBTO 12795, TT 10239, TTO 12354 and DMBTO 12796, was retained by British Rail after withdrawal from normal passenger service for use on special occasions. It was purchased by a group of enthusiasts in 1998. It was stored at the Electric Railway Museum, Warwickshire, after spending many years stored in the open at various locations, but has subsequently been moved to the One:One Collection site in Margate, Kent.
- Former Departmental Converted 4-SUB Carriage TT 10400 was stored at a private site, but was scrapped around 02/2020.

Unit number (current in bold)		DMBTO	TT	TTO	DMBTO	Built	Livery	Location
**1293**	4308	8143	-	-	-	1925 Eastleigh	SR Maunsell Green	National Railway Museum
-	**4732**	12795	12354	10239	12796	1951 Eastleigh	Southern Green	One:One Collection, Margate
-	-	-	10400	-	-	1951 Eastleigh	Network South East	Finmere

== History of individual units ==
Unit Numbers	Type	Introduced	Formation	Notes
989-1200	-	1920–1937	Various	Two-car SUB Trailer sets. Converted from LSWR, SECR and LBSCR steam stock and LBSCR AC electric stock. Disbanded between 1941 and 1948, some cars used to augment 3-car Suburban to 4-SUB.
1201–1284	3-car Suburban	1914–1917	DMBT+TC+DMBC	Built by London and South Western Railway, their numbers E1-E84, ex-steam stock. Most augmented to 4131-4171 and 4195-4234 series in 1942–1948.
1285–1310	3-car Suburban	1925	DMBT+TC+DMBT	Western Section (London to Guildford & Dorking) units, new-build, short frames. Augmented to 4300-4325 series in 1945–1946.
1401–1495	3-car Suburban	1925–1926	DMBT+TC+DMBT	Eastern Section units, ex-SECR steam stock. Most augmented to 4431-4594 series in 1946–1949.
1496–1524	3-car Suburban	1925	DMBT+TC+DMBT	Eastern Section units, new-build, standard frames. Augmented to 4326-4354 series in 1945–1946.
1525–1534	3-car Suburban	1926	DMBT+TC+DMBT	Eastern Section units, ex-SECR steam stock. Most augmented to 4431-4594 series in 1946–1949.
1579–1599	3-car Suburban	1932–1937	DMBT+TC+DMBT	Ex-LSWR steam stock. Most augmented to 4401-4594 series.
1601–1630	3-car Suburban	1927–1928	DMBT+TC+DMBT	Central Section units, ex-SECR steam stock. Most augmented to 4431-4516 series.
1631–1657	3-car Suburban	1928–1929	DMBT+TC+DMBT	Central Section units, ex-LBSCR steam stock. Most augmented to 4517-4614 series.
1658–1701	3-car Suburban	1927–1928	DMBT+TC+DMBC	Central Section units, ex-LSWR steam stock. Most augmented to 4172-4194 and 4235-4250 series.
1702–1716	3-car Suburban	1928	DMBT+TC+DMBC	Central Section units, ex-LBSCR steam stock. Most augmented to 4517-4614 series.
1717–1772	3-car Suburban	1929–1930	DMBT+TC+DMBC	Central Section units, ex-LBSCR AC electric stock. Most augmented to 4517-4579 series.
1773–1785	3-car Suburban	1930–1931	DMBT+TC+DMBC	Ex-LSWR steam stock. Most augmented to 4517-4614 series.
1786–1796	3-car Suburban	1931–1932	DMBT+TC+DMBT	Ex-LSWR steam stock. Most augmented to 4517-4614 series.
1797–1801	3-car Suburban	1932	DMBT+TC+DMBT	Ex-LBSCR steam stock. 1801 later renumbered 1600. Some augmented to 4580-4614 series.
4101	4-SUB	1941	DMBT+TT+TC+DMBT	Prototype new-build, steel bodied 4-SUB unit with domed cab roof.
4102-4110	4-SUB	1944–1945	DMBT+TT+TT+DMBT	New-build, steel bodied 4-SUB units with domed cab roof.
4111-4120	4-SUB	1946	DMBT+TT+TT+DMBT	New-build, steel bodied 4-SUB units with vertical cab roof.
4121-4130	4-SUB	1946	DMBTo+TTo+TT+DMBTo	New-build, steel bodied 4-SUB units with vertical cab roof.
4131-4171	4-SUB	1942–1948	DMBT+TT+TT+DMBT	Ex-3-car Suburban units, with additional ex-3-car Suburban trailer car.
4131-4132	4-SUB	1969	DMBT+TT+TT+DMBT	Second use of unit numbers. Formed from spare steel-bodied SUB cars, including those used in the 7TC unit.
4172-4194	4-SUB	1947–1948	DMBT+TT+TT+DMBT	Ex-3-car Suburban units, with steel-bodied Augmentation trailer.
4195-4234	4-SUB	1942–1948	DMBT+TT+TT+DMBT	Ex-3-car Suburban units, with additional ex-3-car Suburban trailer car.
4235-4249	4-SUB	1947–1949	DMBT+TT+TT+DMBT	Ex-3-car Suburban units, with steel-bodied Augmentation trailer.
4250-4257	4-SUB	1942–1948	DMBT+TT+TT+DMBT	Formed from a variety of spare SUB cars.
4277-4299	4-SUB	1948–1949	DMBTO+TTO+TT+DMBTO	New build, steel-bodied 4-SUB units.
4300-4354	4-SUB	1945–1946	DMBT+TT+TT+DMBT	Ex-3-car Suburban units, with steel-bodied Augmentation trailer.
4355-4376	4-SUB	1947–1948	DMBT-TT-TT-DMBT	New build, steel-bodied 4-SUB units.
4377	4-SUB	1947	DMBT-TTO-TT-DMBT	New build, steel-bodied 4-SUB unit, including prototype full saloon trailer car.
4378-4387	4-SUB	1948	DMBTO+TTO+TT+DMBTO	New build, steel-bodied 4-SUB units.
4401-4594	4-SUB	1946–1947	DMBT+TT+TT+DMBT	Ex-3-car Suburban units, with steel-bodied Augmentation trailer.
4601-4608, 4610/13/14	4-SUB	1947	DMBT+TT+TT+DMBT	First use of unit numbers. Ex-3-car Suburban units, with steel-bodied Augmentation trailer.
4601-4607	4-SUB	1950	DMBTO+TT+TT+DMBTO	Second use of unit numbers. New Driving Motor cars formed with trailers built between 1946 and 1948.
4617-4620	4-SUB	1972–1976		Formed from spare SUB cars built between 1946 and 1950.
4621-4754	4-SUB	1949–1951	DMBTO+TT+TT+DMBTO	Most cars had new bodies on old frames, though some were entirely new build. 4667-4754 included an Augmentation trailer from withdrawn units.
