= Selhurst Depot =

Railway maintenance depot in Selhurst, Croydon

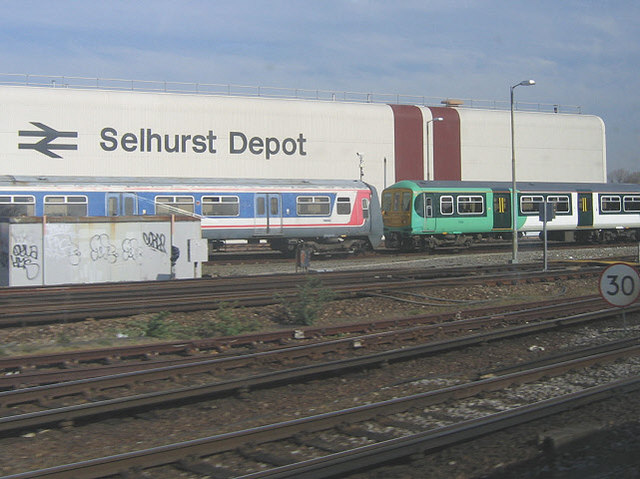
- Interactive map of Selhurst Depot

Location
- Location: Selhurst, London, England
- Coordinates: 51.391329°N 0.084803°W
- OS grid: TQ333675

Characteristics
- Owner: Southern
- Depot code: SU (1973 -)
- Type: DMU, EMU

Selhurst Depot is a railway maintenance facility unit located in Selhurst, South London. It is operated by Southern and primarily used for servicing, cleaning, repairing, and stabling Electrostar and other electric multiple unit trains. It features a large maintenance shed, a train wash, a 5G-enabled, modern, digital maintenance facility to keep commuter trains operational. It services the Brighton Main Line and is opposite Selhurst station. The depot has the code SU.

The depot occupies a triangle of land which is bordered on one side by the Victoria Lines and on the other by the London Bridge Lines. It was built on the site of the former Croydon Common Athletic Ground, where Crystal Palace F.C. played matches between 1918 and 1924.

Located within the main office building is the Selhurst traincrew depot, where many of the train drivers and conductors are based. The depot has extensive stabling sidings, the three main groups of which are known as: Chalk, AC (which were so named because that was where the trains of the former AC system were stabled) and North. At the north east corner of the site near to Norwood Junction station is the smaller Norwood drivers' depot, and beside it the diesel fuelling point. Selhurst Depot is unusual in that the maximum speed within its facilities is 15 mph rather than the usual 5 mph, and signalled train movements are permissive.

== Allocation ==
The depot is owned by Network Rail. As of 2023, the depot's allocation consists of Class 171 DMUs and Class 377 EMUs. It previously shared an allocation of 46 Class 455 EMUs with Stewarts Lane depot until their retirement in 2022.
