= Wimbledon Traincare Depot =

Traction maintenance depot in England operated by South Western Railway

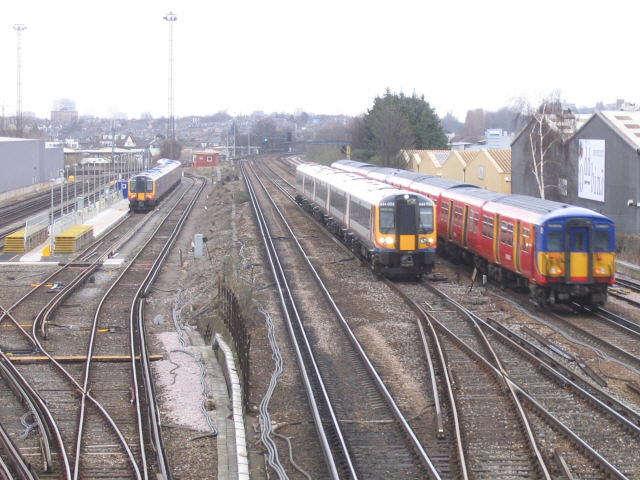
- Wimbledon traincare depot (left) adjacent to the South West Main Line (right)
- Interactive map of Wimbledon Traincare Depot

Location
- Location: Wimbledon, London, England
- Coordinates: 51.436°N 0.194°W
- OS grid: TQ256723

Characteristics
- Owner: Network Rail
- Operator: South Western Railway
- Depot code: WD (1976-)
- Type: EMU

History
- Opened: 3 October 1974; 51 years ago
- BR region: Southern Region
- Former depot code: WDON; WM (1974-1976)

The Wimbledon Traincare Depot is a traction maintenance depot in England operated by South Western Railway. The depot is adjacent to the South West Main Line, located between Wimbledon and Earlsfield stations. The depot is one of the busiest in the country, with an average of 250 carriages maintained there each night.

== History ==
The depot opened on 3 October 1974 on the site of the former Dunsford Road depot. In 1987, the allocation of the depot included Classes 414, 423 and 455 EMUs. As of March 2025, the depot maintains and services Classes 455 and 458 EMUs. In the coming years, these units will be gradually replaced by Class 701s.

The facility achieved ISO 14001 accreditation in recognition of its environmental management policies. On 19 September 2006, Wimbledon Traincare depot was selected as the winner of the Back Office Customer Service Team of the Year.
