= British Rail Class 768 =

British electro-diesel cargo train

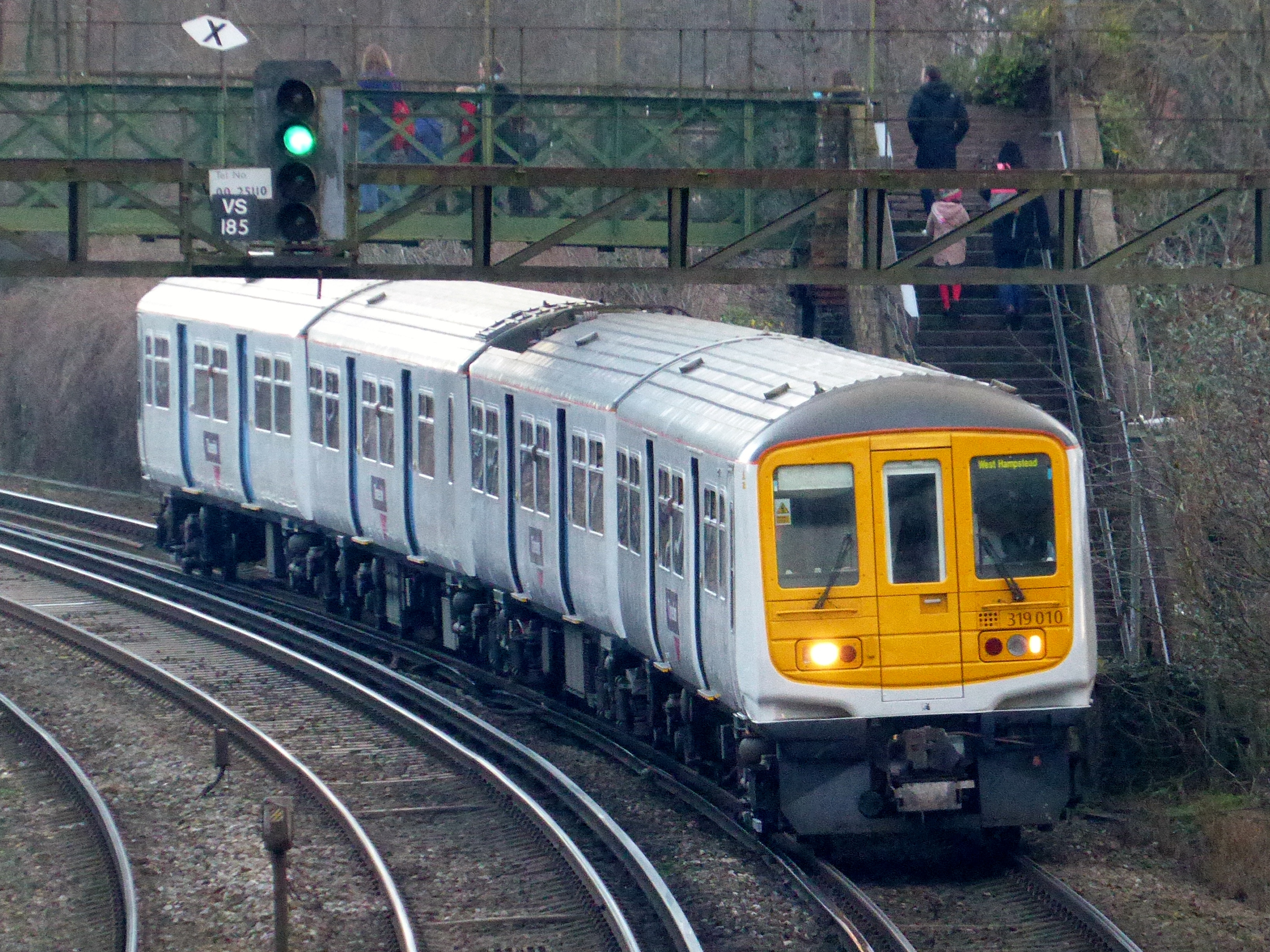
- 319010 was the donor unit for 768001
- Manufacturers: BREL (as 319); Brush Traction (as 768)
- Built at: York Carriage Works (as 319); Loughborough (as 768)
- Family name: BR Second Generation (Mark 3)
- Constructed: 2020– (as 768); 1987–1988, 1990 (as 319)
- Number built: 2 units
- Formation: 4 cars per trainset
- Fleet numbers: 768001 - 768010
- Owner: Porterbrook
- Operator: Rail Operations Group

Specifications
- Car body construction: Steel
- Car length: 19.83 m (65 ft 1 in) (DTCO, DTSO); 19.92 m (65 ft 4 in) (MSO, TSOL)
- Width: 2.82 m (9 ft 3 in)
- Height: 3.58 m (11 ft 9 in)
- Maximum speed: 100 mph (161 km/h)
- Prime mover: MAN D2876 (one per two cars)
- Engine type: 12.8-litre turbo-diesel
- Cylinder count: 6
- Power output: 523 hp (390 kW) per engine
- Transmission: original traction motors via ABB alternator
- Electric systems: 25 kV 50 Hz AC overhead line; 750 V DC third rail
- Current collection: Pantograph (AC); Contact shoe (DC)
- Coupling system: Tightlock
- Track gauge: 1,435 mm (4 ft 8 1/2 in) standard gauge

The British Rail Class 768 is a class of bi-mode multiple unit converted from Class 319 passenger trains by Brush Traction and Wabtec to carry parcels.

== History ==
In December 2018, Rail Operations Group (ROG) ordered two Class 769s that were in the process of being developed by Brush Traction from redundant Class 319s, owned by rolling stock company (ROSCO) Porterbrook. However unlike the Class 769s that remained as passenger trains, ROG's Orion High Speed Trains subsidiary intends to operate them as parcel carriers from London Liverpool Street to London Gateway.

In February 2020, a further three were ordered to allow services to be introduced the Midlands to Scotland via the West Coast Main Line. A further five was later ordered. Originally to be classified as Class 769/5s, they were reclassified as the Class 768 before the first unit was completed.

The two units built received their traction conversions at Brush Traction, Loughborough, while the latter examples will be completed by Wabtec at Doncaster Works. They then move to Eastleigh Works where Arlington Fleet Services fit out the interiors and fit roller doors to carry pallets, bulk items and parcel cages.

The units will operate in fixed formations of two (capable of running in multiples) at up to 100 mph. Unlike conventional rail freight, this provides direct access to city centres, with onward distribution from stations to be by van or bicycle courier. A demonstration from London Euston took place on 7 July 2021.

== Fleet list ==
Number	Rebuilt from	Notes
768001	319010	originally numbered 769501
768002	319009	originally numbered 769502
