= British Rail Class 600 =

Class of hydrogen-powered multiple unit train

British Rail Class 600 Breeze
- Promotional rendering of a Class 600 unit, from 2020
- Manufacturers: As Class 321: British Rail Engineering Limited; Class 600 conversion: Alstom
- Family name: BR Second Generation (Mark 3)
- Number built: Never Built
- Formation: 3 cars per unit
- Owner: Eversholt Rail Group

Specifications
- Car body construction: Steel
- Car length: Outer vehicles: 19.950 m (65 ft 5.4 in); Intermediate vehicles: 19.920 m (65 ft 4.3 in)
- Width: 2.816 m (9 ft 2.9 in)
- Doors: Dual-leaf sliding pocket, each 1.200 m (3 ft 11.2 in) wide
- Wheelbase: Over bogie centres: 14.170 m (46 ft 5.9 in)
- Engine type: Hydrogen fuel cell
- Coupling system: Tightlock
- Track gauge: 1,435 mm (4 ft 8 1/2 in) standard gauge

The British Rail Class 600 Breeze was a proposed class of hydrogen fuel cell-powered multiple units that was to have been converted from existing BREL Class 321 electric multiple units. The project commenced in 2018, but was cancelled in 2022 before any conversions took place.

== History ==
In May 2018, Alstom and Eversholt Rail Group announced that they planned to "upcycle" into hydrogen-fuelled prototypes a number of Class 321 units that were no longer needed in passenger service by Abellio Greater Anglia. They called the project "the first substantive industry response to the government's challenge to remove diesel rolling stock by 2040", and claimed that hydrogen power "could offer the right zero carbon solution for many parts of the [British] network". The technology involved in the conversion was to be based on that already employed by Alstom in developing their Coradia iLint prototype, which it had been testing in Germany since March 2017.

The engineering study and design concept for the 'Breeze' proposal were published in January 2019, following which Alstom and Eversholt were working to develop business cases and detailed plans for both the conversion and entry-into-services processes, as well as the required infrastructure for refuelling the units in the field. The conversion work was to be undertaken at Alstom's facility in Widnes, Cheshire, and it was expected that completed units could be available to enter service from 2022 onwards. As part of the conversion, the units would be reduced from four- to three-car formations and some of the passenger saloon would be taken over for storage of hydrogen – giving an in-service passenger capacity intended to be similar to that of a two-car diesel multiple unit.

In February 2020, Arriva Rail North (operating as 'Northern') detailed its plans for a self-contained network of Breeze units centred on Middlesbrough in Teesside, a significant hub for hydrogen production in the UK. A fleet of approximately twelve units would operate services on routes between Middlesbrough and Nunthorpe, Bishop Auckland, and Saltburn, with the possibility of extension to Whitby, and to Newcastle via Hartlepool and Sunderland on the Durham Coast Line. A maintenance and refuelling depot was to be built in the nearby area; possibly in or near Lackenby, a village immediately to the east of Middlesbrough. Arriva Rail North indicated that they believed these services would be ideally suited to hydrogen operation, as they use lines which are unlikely to be electrified, and are short enough that the Breeze units could return to the depot each night for refuelling; likely to be an operational necessity given that the Breeze units were expected to have an operating range shorter than that of comparable diesel-powered multiple units.

In July 2020, Alstom and Eversholt announced that they were making an additional £1 million investment in furthering the project towards readiness for service in 2024, alongside a confirmation that the Breeze units would receive the Class 600 designation. Alstom claimed as part of the announcement that it intended for its Widnes Transport Technology Centre to become the company's "worldwide centre of excellence" for hydrogen conversion once Breeze units were in series production, which would create over 200 highly-skilled jobs.

The first Class 321 unit selected for Breeze conversion was 321448, which had previously acted as the prototype for Eversholt's Renatus refurbishment project, although it was subsequently reported that 321437 had taken the former unit's place.

In November 2021, Alstom and Eversholt announced they had agreed a memorandum of understanding to co-operate on developing a new-build fleet of ten three-car hydrogen-powered multiple units based on the Aventra EMU platform, which Alstom had acquired as part of its takeover of Bombardier Transportation at the beginning of 2021. The companies stated that experience from the Breeze project had been "invaluable" in planning the hydrogen Aventra, while a spokesperson for Alstom said that there existed "a clear need and market appetite for new hydrogen trains", and that the "finite supply of trains for conversion" would have necessitated the development of a new-build hydrogen-fuelled unit regardless. The Aventra platform's advanced onboard systems, integrated diagnostics, and reduced requirement for routine maintenance were also noted as advantages to pursuing the new strategy – though it was stated nevertheless that Alstom would maintain the option of converting existing trains.

The Breeze project was terminated in the first half of 2022, with 321448, one of the two initially selected for conversion, scrapped.

== See also ==
- British Rail Class 799 HydroFlex – a separate conversion project to add hydrogen-fuel capability to Class 319 electric multiple units
