= British Rail Class 799 =

Class of hydrogen-powered multiple unit train

British Rail Class 799 HydroFLEX
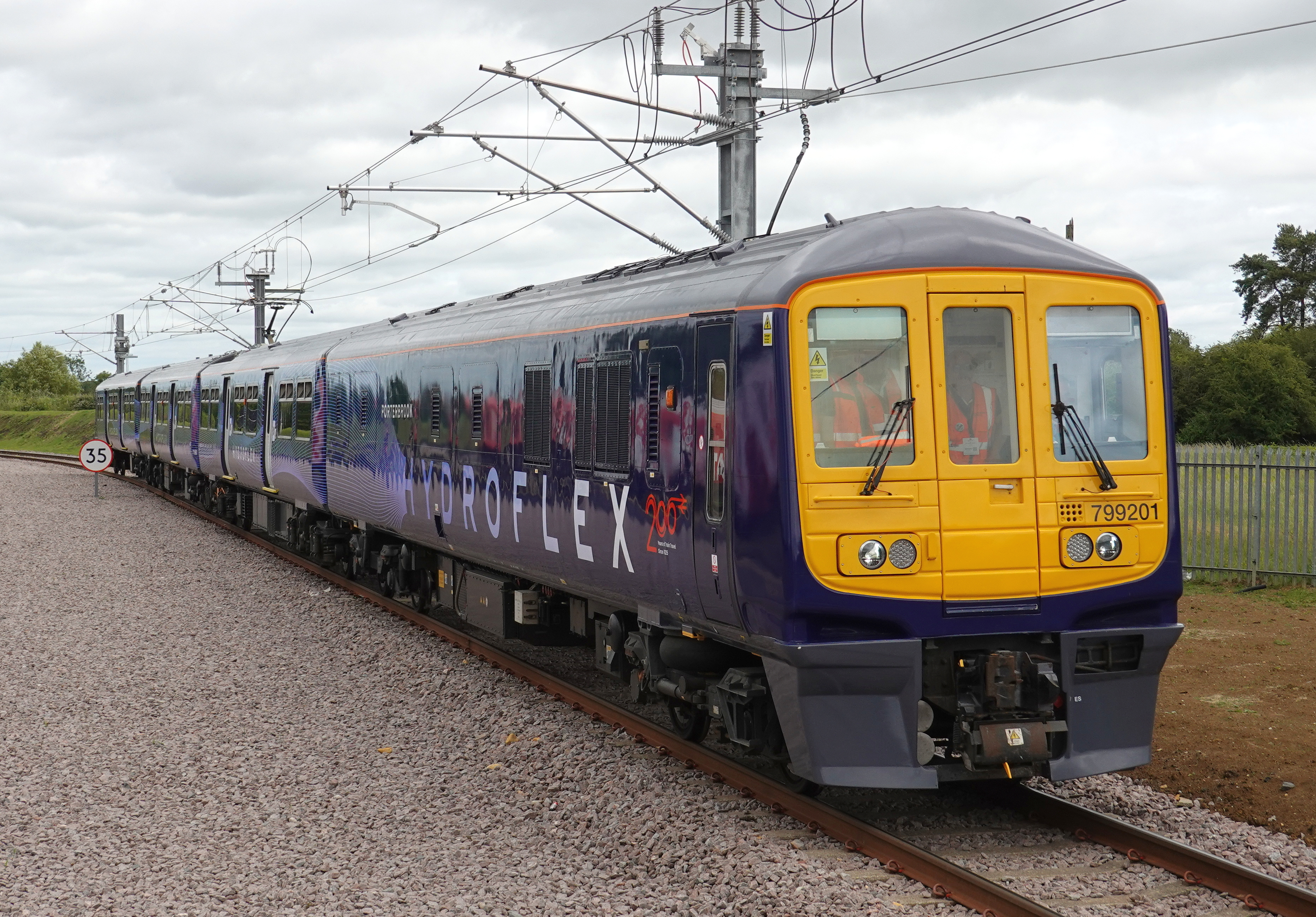
- Class 799 unit 799201 at Long Marston Depot in 2026
- Manufacturers: As Class 319: British Rail Engineering Limited; Conversion to Class 799: Porterbrook, University of Birmingham CRRE
- Family name: BR Second Generation (Mark 3)
- Constructed: 2019, 2021
- Number built: 2
- Number scrapped: 1
- Formation: 4 cars per unit
- Fleet numbers: 799001, 799201

Specifications
- Car body construction: Steel
- Car length: Outer vehicles: 19.830 m (65 ft 0.7 in); Intermediate vehicles: 19.920 m (65 ft 4.3 in)
- Width: 2.816 m (9 ft 2.9 in)
- Height: 3.774 m (12 ft 4.6 in)
- Wheelbase: Over bogie centres: 14.17 m (46 ft 6 in)
- Prime mover: Ballard FCveloCity
- Engine type: Hydrogen fuel cell
- HVAC: Electric heating
- Electric systems: 25 kV 50 Hz AC overhead; 750 V DC third rail
- Current collection: Pantograph (AC); Contact shoe (DC)
- Braking system: Electro-pneumatic (disc)
- Safety systems: AWS; TPWS
- Coupling system: Tightlock
- Track gauge: 1,435 mm (4 ft 8 1/2 in) standard gauge

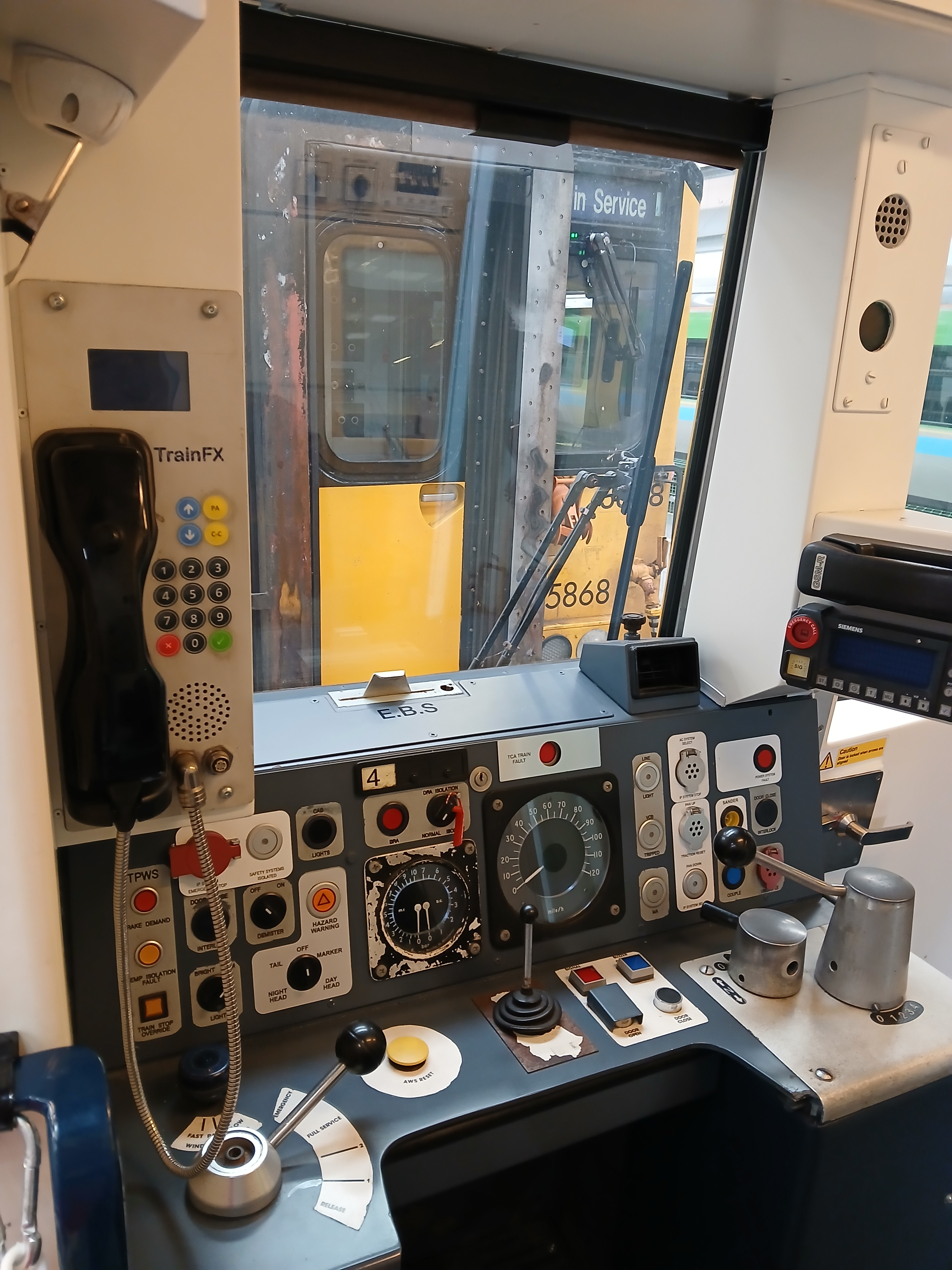
Cab interior

The British Rail Class 799 HydroFLEX is a prototype class of bi-mode multiple unit adapted from Class 319 electric multiple units (319001/382). The existing 25 kV AC and 750 V DC equipment has been retained with a hydrogen fuel cell added, currently taking up one of the carriages.

== History ==
The Class 319 units were built by BREL between 1987 and 1990 for Network SouthEast, as dual-voltage units to run on Thameslink services. In late 2014, Govia Thameslink Railway began returning its allocation of Class 319 units to Porterbrook (the owner of the units) as they were gradually replaced by Class 387 units and then ultimately Class 700 units on Thameslink services.

In September 2018, Porterbrook announced it would develop a hydrogen fuel cell demonstrator in partnership with the University of Birmingham's Centre for Railway Research and Education. In December 2018, Porterbrook procured an FCveloCity fuel cell unit from Ballard Power Systems.

The first unit was converted from a Class 319 unit that had last been used by Govia Thameslink Railway. It was unveiled on 20 June 2019. In June 2019, it was announced that approval for mainline testing of the unit (branded as HydroFLEX) had been granted after a period of demonstration at Rail Live 2019.

The first mainline testing occurred in September 2020, reaching 50 mph (80 km/h) through Warwickshire. The next phase of the development of this prototype is move the hydrogen tanks and fuel cell from one of the carriages and suspend them beneath the train.

A second unit was presented at the COP26 Summit at Glasgow with one of the DT car's passenger doors removed and permanently sealed. The TSOL has also been reconfigured with a boardroom-styled interior specially for the summit.

== Fleet details ==
Subclass	Quantity converted	Year converted	Cars per unit	Unit numbers	Converted from	Notes
799/0	1	2019	4	799001	319001	Scrapped.
799/2	1	2021	4	799201	319382	Unveiled at COP26 in Glasgow.

== See also ==
- British Rail Class 600 Breeze – a separate project, cancelled in 2022, to convert Class 321 EMUs for hydrogen fuel-cell operation.
- British Rail Class 614 – a prototype hydrogen fuel-cell unit converted from a Class 314 EMU.
