= Eversholt Rail Group =

British rolling stock company

- Company type: Subsidiary
- Predecessor: British Rail
- Founded: April 1994; 32 years ago
- Headquarters: London, England
- Area served: United Kingdom
- Key people: Mary Kenny (Chief Executive)
- Products: Rolling stock leasing
- Parent: Beacon Rail
- Website: www.eversholtrail.co.uk

Eversholt Rail Group is a British rolling stock company that, along with Angel Trains and Porterbrook, is one of the firms created from the privatisation of British Rail. Formed in March 1994, the firm was privatised the following year via a £580 million management buyout.

Sold to Midland Bank and renamed twice (Forward Trust and HSBC Rail), it operated primarily in the UK market, although the latter was active in the European leasing market in the 2000s, after the UK business had been split off and sold. Subsequently, the European leasing business was sold to rival leasing Beacon Rail and what had been the UK part was then also ultimately also purchased by Beacon Rail, later - effectively re-merging the operations.

Involved in supplying 28 British Rail Class 395 high speed train sets under a £250 million contract, HSBC Rail also submitted an unsolicited and dismissed response to the Intercity Express Programme. During the 2010s, it focused on either selling or retrofitting ageing elements of its rolling stock fleet.

After being rebranded back to Eversholt Rail Group in 2010 and being sold to private financial companies, it was acquired five years later by CK Hutchison Holdings and Cheung Kong Infrastructure Holdings.

In January 2026, ERG was acquired by Beacon Rail. It was then made a part of Beacon.

== History ==
Eversholt Rail Group was established on 21 March 1994 as a subsidiary of British Rail in preparation for the privatisation of British Rail. It was named after Eversholt Street in London near Euston station in which British Rail's offices were located. During November 1995, British Rail sold its subsidiary via a management buyout in exchange for £580 million; this price was subsequently criticised for being undervalued.

Reported in February 1997 at a cost of £726.5 million, Midland Bank acquired Eversholt, whose portfolio consisted of 4,000 electric locomotives and passenger multiple units. After being renamed Forward Trust a year later, it was renamed again in November 1999, this time to HSBC Rail, as part of a rebranding by its parent company HSBC.

In 2000, HSBC Rail leased its first rolling stock outside of the United Kingdom via a financing arrangement on two EMD JT42CWRs for Swedish freight operator TGOJ Trafik. However, during 2009, the company ultimately opted to entirely withdraw from the European market; to this end, it sold its fleet of twenty EMD JT42CWR locomotives to Beacon Rail.

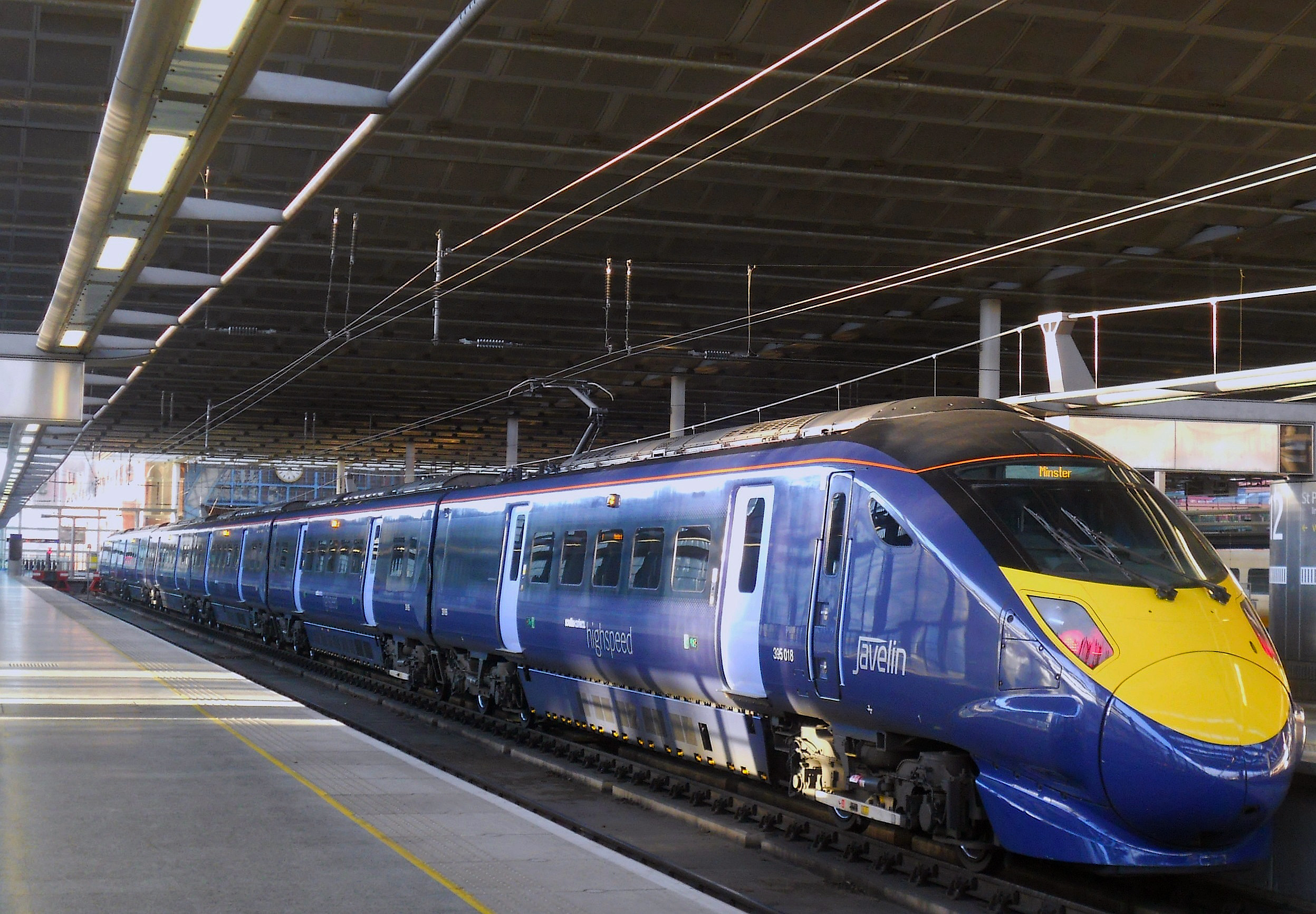
Southeastern High Speed Class 395 No. 395018 at St Pancras International

During June 2005, a contract valued at £250 million was signed with Hitachi Europe to supply 28 British Rail Class 395 high speed train sets, with HSBC Rail acting as the financier. This contract was also the first ever British order for a Japanese train; Hitachi reportedly viewed the deal as a key opportunity to establish itself in the UK market.

HSBC Rail also involved itself in a consortium providing maintenance services, referred to as 'DEPCO', to the fleet; other members were Fitzpatrick Contractors Ltd (construction), RPS Burks Green (architects/civil engineers), EMCOR UK (mechanical and electrical plant) and GrantRail (trackwork).

After being rebranded again to Eversholt Rail Group in January 2010, it was sold to a consortium formed by 3i, Morgan Stanley and Star Capital Partners in November.

During the early 2010s, in response to the Intercity Express Programme led by Britain's Department for Transport, Eversholt issued its own counter-proposal for the renewal of rolling stock on the East Coast Main Line; this option, which would have reportedly consisted of new locomotives and carriages, was to be considerably cheaper than the Class 800, a Hitachi-built high speed multiple unit train. However, Eversholt was ultimately unable to convince the DfT to pursue their solution.

In addition to the acquisition of new rolling stock, Eversholt has been a keen advocate of upgrading existing units as well. Its fleet of Class 321 electric multiple units has been subject to numerous extensive alterations and retrofits; in December 2013, it rebuilt one as a demonstrator for a proposed upgrade. In May 2018, plans were announced to convert some Class 321s with Alstom hydrogen cells, using the acronym HMU (hydrogen multiple unit) and re-designated Class 600.

A number of this class of train will be converted to hydrogen power and operational by 2024. The first concept of this conversion, dubbed "Breeze", was revealed by Alstom and Eversholt Rail in January 2019. In March 2021, Eversholt announced the conversion of one for use as a parcels train.

In January 2015, Eversholt was purchased by a consortium of CK Hutchison Holdings and Cheung Kong Infrastructure Holdings in exchange for a reported £2 billion. At this time, it controlled roughly 28 per cent of passenger trains within the UK market, thus the deal was subject to review by the European Commission. In March 2015, Eversholt announced the sale of its 920 wagon fleet to NACCO Industries.

While responsibility for the Class 365 EMUs was transferred to Eversholt during the privatisation process, due to the British Railways Board having leased rather than purchased these units, via a clause in the original procurement contract, ownership of the remaining 40 sets passed to the Department for Transport subsidiary Train Fleet (2019) Limited in July 2019, after it was obliged to pay out the leases to the Royal Bank of Scotland in the event that the trains were not wanted. In July 2021, all were sold back to Eversholt after the termination of their leases with Govia Thameslink Railway was agreed.

By May 2022, Eversholt Rail Group owned 3,246 vehicles, of which 2,721 are electric-powered.

In January 2026, Eversholt was acquired and subsumed by Beacon Rail.

== Initial fleet ==
The fleet Eversholt Rail Group inherited from British Rail in 1994 comprised:

Class	Number of items of rolling stock
86	51
91	31
302	104
304	25
310	192
313	192
315	224
318	63
320	66
321	456
322	20
365	164
421	220
423	308
455	184
465	388
483	16
Mark 1	19
Mark 2A	48
Mark 2D/E/F	509
Mark 4	314

== Pre-Series Revolution VLR ==
In December 2023 Eversholt Rail ordered three Pre-Series Revolution VLR (RVLR) battery-only vehicles, with lineside fast charging, from TDI, for passenger trials and service. They will be built from 2024 and are expected to be ready for passenger operation in 2026. They will be based on the RVLR Demonstrator tested at Ironbridge. A report says they will be 18.9 m (62 ft) long, formed with composite carbon fibre and aluminium panels and have 56 seats and a maximum speed of 104 km/h (65 mph), which is the same as the demonstrator car, which had a steel ladder chassis, was 2.8 m (9 ft 2 in) wide, 3.8 m (12 ft) high and had four single leaf sliding plug doors.
