= Rail Operations Group =

British railway company

Rail Operations (UK) Limited

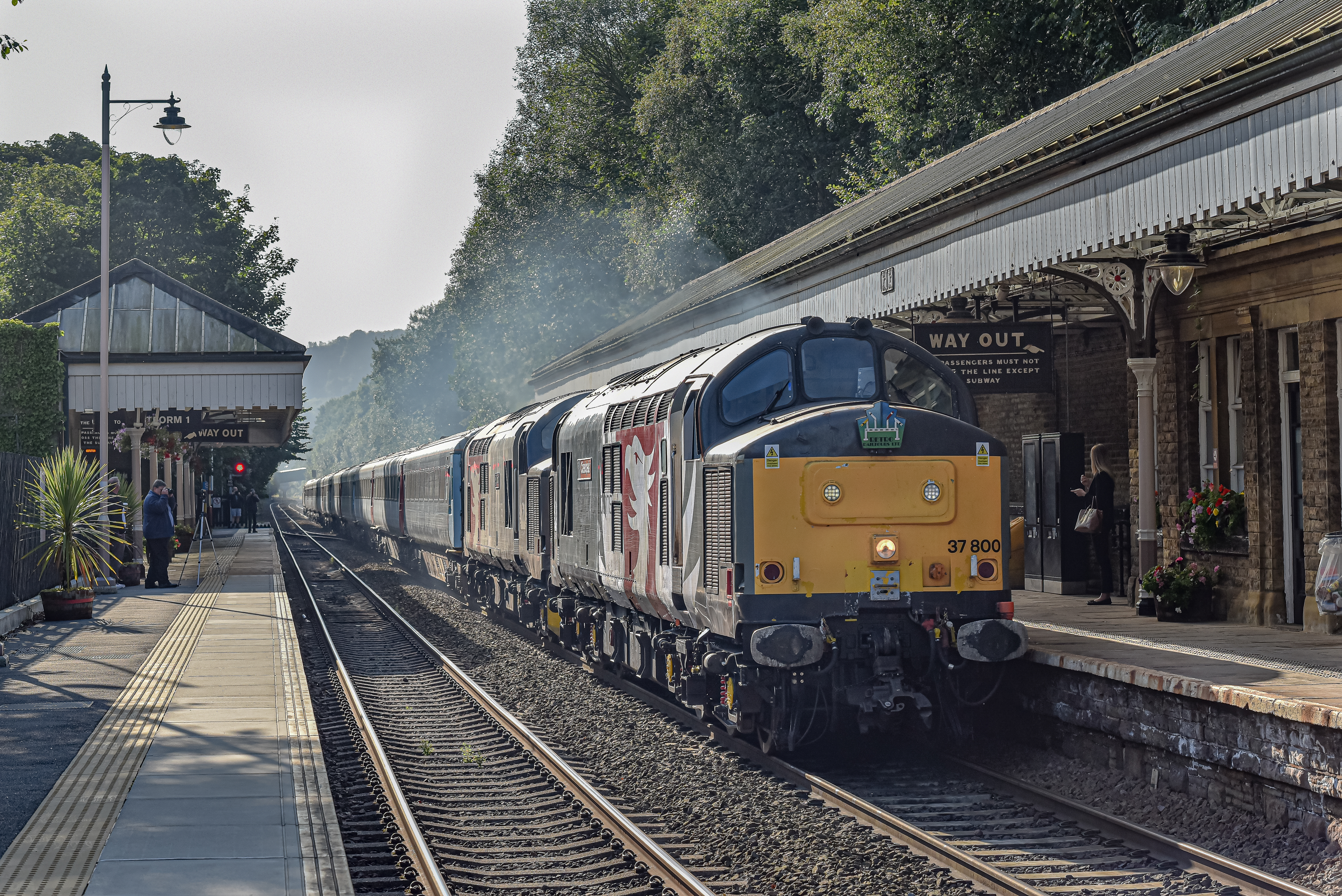

Overview
- Headquarters: Derby, England
- Key people: Dave Burley (CEO), Steve Proffitt (Ops Director)
- Dates of operation: 2014–

Other
- Website: www.railopsgroup.co.uk

Rail Operations Group (ROG) is a British company which specialises in ad-hoc movement of rolling stock for rolling stock companies and train operating companies, as well as locomotive spot hire services and the operation of charter trains. It has its headquarters and main offices based in Derby.

ROG was established during 2014, and received its operating licence from the Office of Rail and Road (ORR) during March 2016, commencing rail operations immediately thereafter. Early on, ROG operated a small fleet of leased Class 37 locomotives, and has quickly diversified its fleet to include both newer and more powerful types such as the Class 47, Class 56 and Class 57. The company has stated its ambitions to procure new-built locomotives and to operate its own high speed freight services, challenging the traditional model.

== History ==
The Rail Operations Group (ROG) was established during 2014 by Karl Watts, Gary Prodger and Gordon Cox. At its onset, the company was expressly focused upon serving the expanding rail services sector, such as the haulage of new and refurbished trainsets between manufacturing sites, ports, and depots, as well as transferring off-lease trains around the rail network. According to Watts, a valuable opportunity had been presented at this time by a large proportion of rolling stock that was approaching the end of their leases.

During March 2016, the company was granted an operating licence by the Office of Rail and Road (ORR), allowing it to commence rolling stock movements. ROG initially operated such movements using a single Class 37 locomotive which had been leased from Europhoenix in November 2015. During July 2016, ROG opted to lease a second Class 37, also supplied by Europhoenix. Typical rolling stock movements using ROG's Class 37s involved directly coupling to the specific trainset being hauled, as opposed to the conventional approach of marshalling and shunting the trainset into a longer freight train, which was considerably more time-consuming at both the departure and arrival parts of the journey.

Another strategy employed by ROG to reduce the complexity of rolling stock movements was using its train crews to operate the trainsets directly, rather than hauling them via a separate locomotive at all. Such an approach had been used on several occasions, including the movement of Greater Anglia's Class 321 multiple units, Northern Rail’s Sprinter fleet and Abellio ScotRail's InterCity 125s. By 2019, roughly 60 per cent of all rolling stock movements were using this self-powered approach. Unlike conventional train operating companies, ROG lacks a routine operating plan, instead dynamically adjusting to customer requirements; the company's management has attributed this flexibility as having resulted in high customer satisfaction and repeated custom.

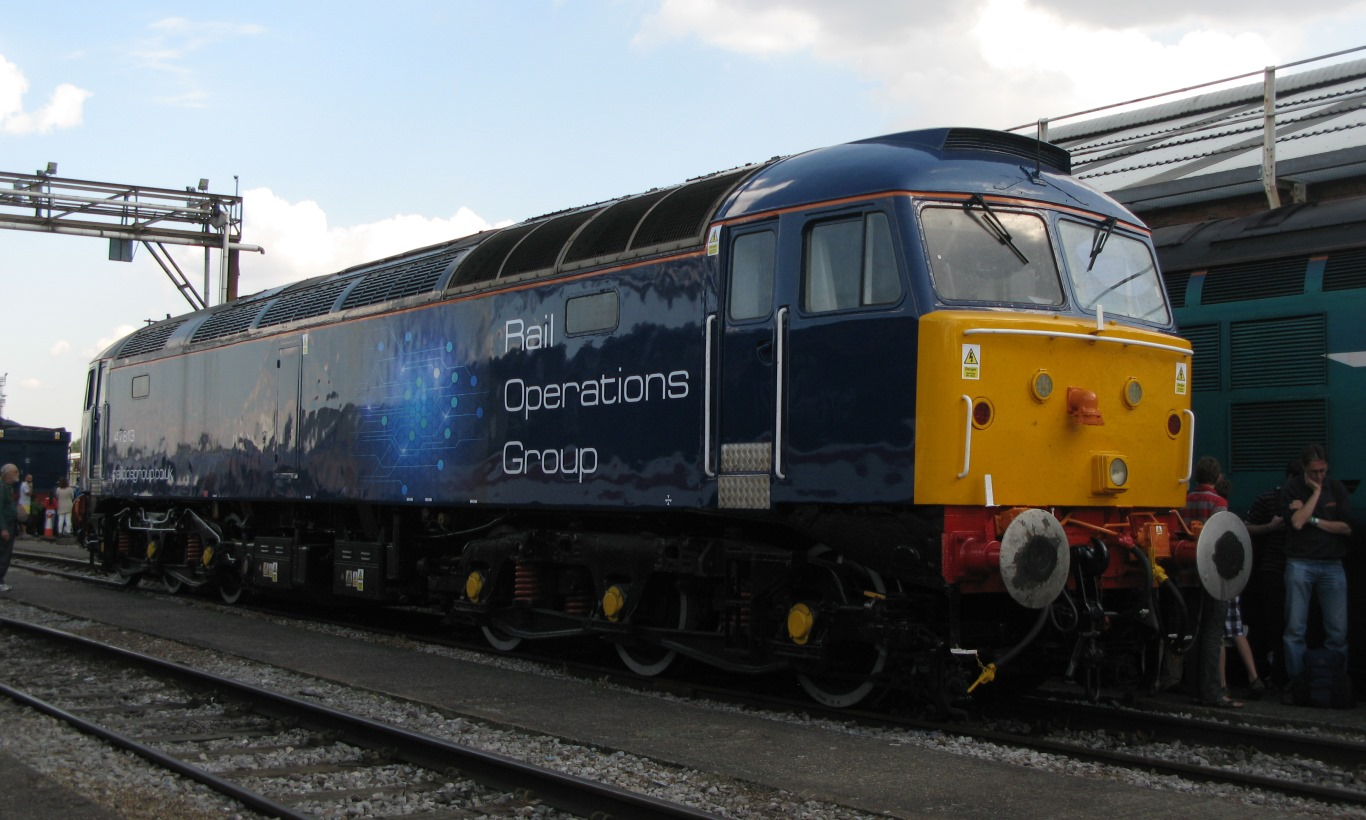
47813 at Old Oak Common TMD in September 2017

Between 2016 and 2017, ROG purchased a total of five Class 47 locomotives from Riviera Trains, as well as another one from Direct Rail Services. Furthermore, a handful of Class 56 locomotives were also hired on a short term basis, mainly from UK Rail Leasing while another example was leased from the Class 56 Preservation Group; they were used to perform rolling stock haulage.

In July 2016, ROG was granted a charter operator licence by the ORR. One month later, ROG commenced a five-year contract to move rolling stock for Angel Trains. ROG operated its first scheduled passenger services, providing additional relief services from London Marylebone to Birmingham Moor Street under contract to Chiltern Railways between 26-28 August 2017 due to the temporary closure of London Euston, these services were operated by 47812 and 813 with six leased Mk2 Coaches. However, according to the company's management, passenger services remain a relatively low priority compared with other sectors being targeted by the business.

During 2017, ROG began to move second generation multiple units without having to use a barrier vehicle; this was achieved by fitting some of its locomotives with Dellner couplers to haul multiple units built after 2001 and using a tightlock coupling device developed by UK Rail Leasing. ROG worked with Dellner and external consultants to specially design the coupler to be highly adjustable to suit various different rolling stock; specifically, the height of the adapter can be rapidly altered to sit at the optimal height for the hauled consist, while the electrical equipment was also reengineered so that longer consists could be hauled by its Class 37s. Amongst other benefits, these modifications meant that ROG did not rely on separate translator vehicles, further simplifying movements.

ROG experienced a rapid expansion in demand for its services during its first few years of operation, recording an average year-on-year growth rate of 91 per cent as of 2019. The company has organised itself into four major division, consisting of ROG, Traxion (handling the storage of rolling stock), Orion (handling the freight & logistics sector), and an unnamed charter operator unit. ROG has anticipated that the high demand rolling stock haulage may be strong only in the short term, thus management have sought to diversify and innovate in various sectors of the rail industry, particularly in terms of freight.

By 2019, ROG had been contracted to be involved with the testing and commissioning of several new fleets, such as Greater Anglia’s Stadler units and London Overground Class 710 multiple units. The company has also leased several Class 50 locomotives, which have been used for snow clearing and to assist other train operating companies in route learning for diversions. In 2018, ROG confirmed a long term lease for two Class 57s owned by Direct Rail Services; the company also announced its intentions to order a batch of ten new-build Class 93s from Stadler Rail. At the time, the first locomotive was anticipated to be delivered around August 2020.

By 2019, ROG's management had developed ambitious plans for high speed logistics services under the branding of Orion. The firm hopes to drive a modal shift from road towards the railway, observing the market for parcels and express delivery to be valued at £16.7 billion alone. While conventional freight operator have offered the market relatively inflexible timetables, management believe that flexibility and high speeds would positively influence customers. The company reportedly aims to offer freight services at speeds of up to 125mph across the railway network via the procurement of a new generation of traction. By travelling at such high speeds, logistics services could slot into existing paths along the East Coast Main Line and the West Coast Main Line, alleviating capacity issues. ROG has speculated on using various existing traction, including the Class 91, Class 90, as well as the new-built Class 93, hauling consists of converted Mark 3 carriages. Services to London's terminal stations is feasible due to low passenger demands during night time.

On 12 January 2021 a press release indicating STAR Capital Partnership had made a significant investment in the group's controlling company Rail Operations (UK) Limited (ROUK). ROUK's existing subsidiaries of Rail Operations Group Limited (ROG) and Rail Operations (Rolling Stock Management) Limited (Traxion) were to be joined by a new subsidiary Orion to focus on high speed logistics and freight services.

== Fleet ==
=== Current fleet ===
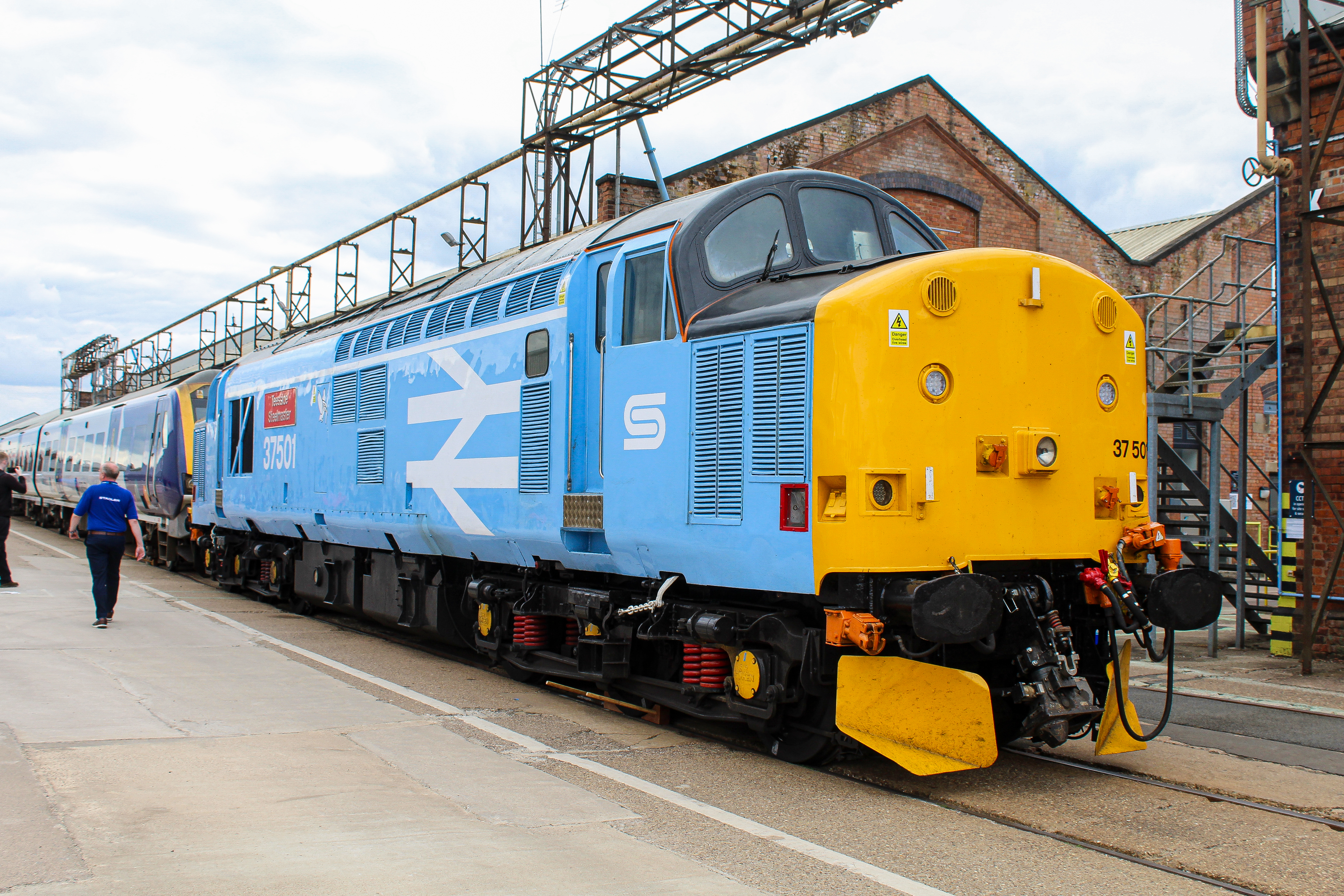
ROG 37501 Teesside Steelmaster in unique British Steel blue livery at the Greatest Gathering, Derby in 2025

Rail Operations Group has a fleet of 6 locomotives.

Class	Image	Type	Top speed		Number	Wheel Arr	Locomotive numbers	Built
Class	Image	Type	mph	km/h	Number	Wheel Arr	Locomotive numbers	Built
Diesel locomotives
37/6 & 37/7		Diesel locomotive	80	130	6	Co-Co	37510, 37601, 37608, 37611, 37800, 37884	1961–63

=== Future fleet ===
At one point, ROG anticipated receiving the first of ten Class 93 tri-mode locomotives during 2020. The company had promoted the type as being considerably more advanced and environmentally friendly than typical diesel-powered freight locomotives such as the Class 66. While traditional freight trains are often difficult to path due to passenger services being far faster, the Class 93 is capable of comparable speeds, eliminating a traditional capacity limitation. By January 2021 a firm order for thirty Class 93 tri-mode locomotives built by Stadler was placed, with the initial batch of ten due for delivery in early 2023.

In January 2019, ROG was confirmed its plans to operate a pair of Class 768 multiple units; these would be operated on nighttime services hauling mail. The bi-mode propulsion system fitted enables a greater robustness of services, as they can readily diverge from the electrified principal routes via unwired diversions to avoid engineering works or other causes of route unavailability. While the Class 768s are to be refurbished by Wabtec for hauling light cargo, they are to retain their passenger information systems so that they can be readily converted back to regular passenger duties if required. During March 2020, it was announced that the order had been increased to five units as the company sought to expand its presence in the logistics sector.

In March 2021, it was announced that it will use 10 Class 768s and 9 Class 319s for the logistics services with the Class 768s able to drag Class 319s on non-electrified routes. It was also announced that the first trial service will commence in April 2021 with the Midlands to Mossend route. In 2023, ROG's CEO announced that Orion was being put on hold with a determination to resume the operation in the future. In April 2025, ROG announced that after 319373 being used as a concept for the potential return of parcel trains on the GB network, it was retired and no longer contributes to the High Speed Logistics initiative.

Class	Image	Type	Top speed		Number	Locomotive/unit numbers	Built
Class	Image	Type	mph	km/h	Number	Locomotive/unit numbers	Built
93		Tri-mode locomotive	110	180	30	93001–93030	2022–2023

=== Past fleet ===
Class	Image	Type	Top speed		Number	Built	Wheel Arr	Notes
Class	Image	Type	mph	km/h	Number	Built	Wheel Arr	Notes
20/0 & 20/3		Diesel locomotive	75	121	4	1957-1962; 1965-1968	Bo-Bo	Returned to Harry Needle Railroad Company after hire period in May 2020.: 20118, 20132, 20311, 20314
47/4		Diesel locomotive	95	153	6	1964-65	Co-Co	Sold to West Coast Railways in April 2021.: 47812-813, 47815, 47843, 47847-848
56		Diesel locomotive	80	129	4	1976-84	Co-Co	Returned to UK Rail Leasing after hire period in 2016.: 56081, 56098, 56104, 56301
57/3		Diesel locomotive	95	153	4	1964-67	Co-Co	Returned to Direct Rail Services in 2022 after a long-term lease.: 57301, 57305, 57310, 57312
Class 319/3		Electric multiple unit	100	161	1	1990		Scrapped: 319373
360/2 Desiro		Electric multiple unit	100	161	5	2004-2005		2 units scrapped, 3 units sold to the Global Centre for Rail Excellence (GCRE).: 360201-360205
