= Spa Road Junction rail crash =

Railway accident in the UK

Coordinates: 51°29′24″N 0°3′16″W

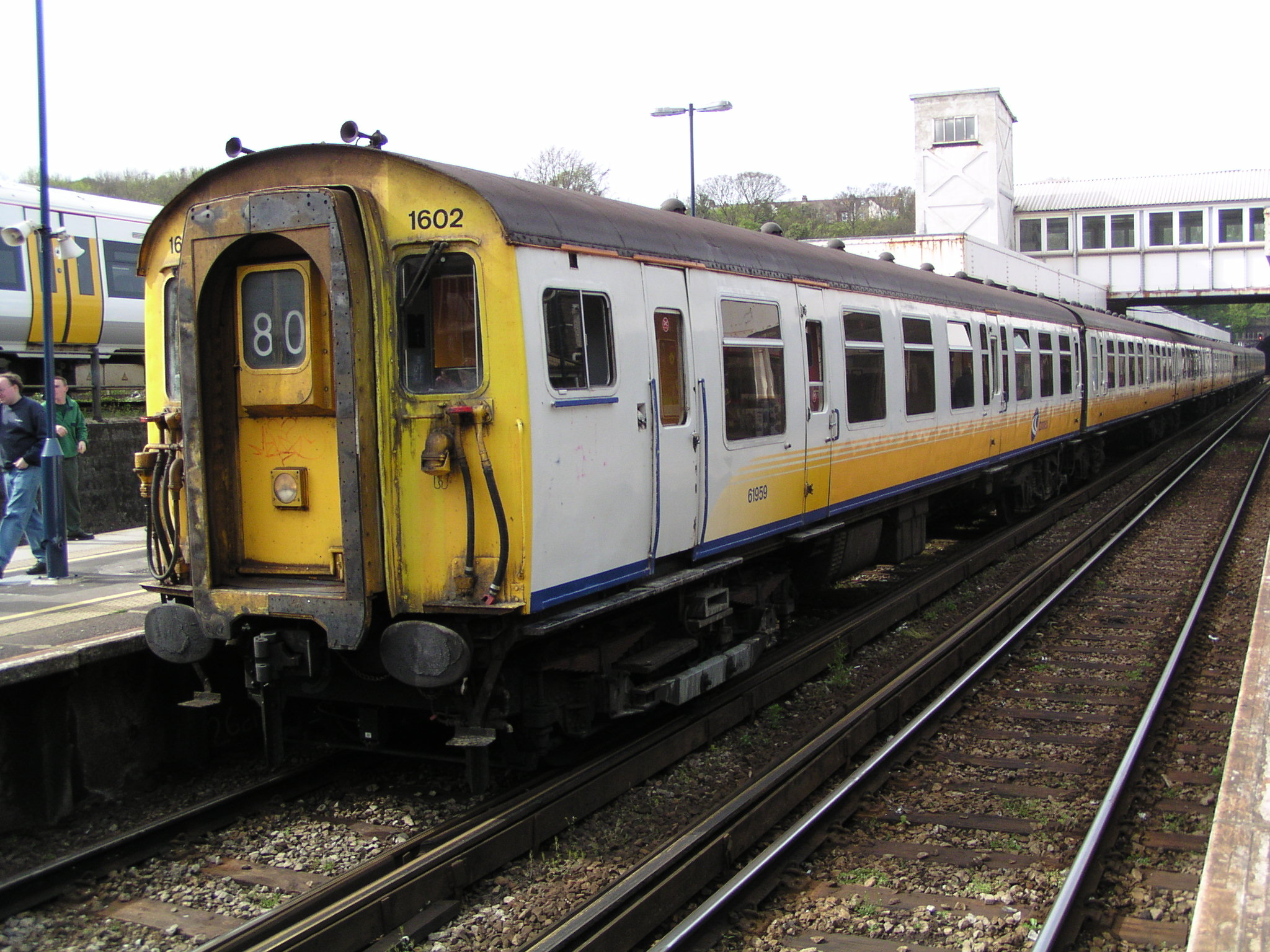
- Class 411 unit 1602, which was involved in the crash, seen at Dover Priory in 2003

- Location within London Borough of Southwark

Details
- Date: 8 January 1999; 17:25
- Location: Spa Road Junction
- Country: England
- Line: South Eastern Main Line
- Operator: Connex South Eastern; Thameslink
- Owner: Railtrack
- Cause: Signal passed at danger caused by driver error

Statistics
- Trains: 2
- Passengers: ~300
- Deaths: 0
- Injured: 4

The Spa Road Junction rail crash was an accident on the British railway system which occurred during the peak evening rush hour of 8 January 1999 at Spa Road Junction in Bermondsey, in southeast London.

== The incident ==
On a dark and wet evening, a Connex South Eastern train from Dover Priory to Charing Cross collided with a Thameslink train from Brighton to Bedford causing both trains to derail. The accident resulted in no fatalities, but only four injuries. The British Transport Police reported that eight passengers had been taken to hospital with minor bumps, bruises and whiplash, but none were detained. One of the uninjured passengers complained that the Train Operating Companies had failed to provide support after the crash. He was awarded compensation in a court case but commented "And there I believe the matter will rest until the next rail crash when we the long-suffering passengers should be aware that unless we are carted off to hospital we will have to fend for ourselves wherever we are dumped".

Connex Rail admitted that its driver passed the signal at danger although the existing Automatic Warning System was working. Following this and other similar accidents, Railtrack was given six months to develop a plan to roll out the new Train Protection & Warning System which would automatically apply the brakes if a train passed a red signal.

The Thameslink train had been held at a danger (red) signal until the route was set for it to cross from the Brighton Main Line onto the London Bridge Up Loop Line, and the signal then cleared. The Connex train, which was approaching from behind, passed a preliminary caution (double yellow) signal, then a caution (yellow) signal, and then a danger (red) signal. It continued for 283 metres (309 yards) past the red signal until the point where the two lines converged. It was travelling at an estimated speed of 39 mph (63 km/h) when it collided with the Thameslink train which was estimated to be travelling at around 31 mph (50 km/h). Both trains were derailed and damage was caused to most of the carriages.

Disruption was caused to other rail services, although trains continued to run normally past the accident site on the Cannon Street lines. The emergency services struggled to access the accident scene, but eventually 282 people were evacuated from these two trains. Some 200 people from another train a short distance behind (Connex South Central service from London Bridge to Guildford train) were initially left unsupervised, and had to find their own way to evacuate themselves in the inclement weather. Some people had to be evacuated to street level through the disused Spa Road railway station building, the former terminus of the South Eastern & Chatham Railway. Trains were still running on the southeastern side, some 30 to 40 ft (9 to 12 m) away from passengers evacuating the Guildford bound train.

The driver of the Connex train had already passed a signal at danger without authority on a previous occasion, and was still under special supervision because of this. Following the accident, he was permanently removed from driving duties.

There was no history of previous Category A SPADs at this signal.

== Junction layout ==
Spa Road Junction is a busy ladder-crossover, located a short distance south east of London Bridge station. It controls the crossing movements to and from London Bridge (High Level) station, and at the time of the collision in 1999 the track layout was:

- Line 1 Down (from Cannon Street via London Bridge)
- Line 2 Reversible (to/from Cannon Street via London Bridge)
- Line 3 Up (to Cannon Street via London Bridge)
- Line 4 Down (from Charing Cross via London Bridge)
- Line 5 Down (from Charing Cross via London Bridge)
- Line 6 Up (To Charing Cross via London Bridge)
- Line 7 Up Passenger Loop (To Charing Cross via London Bridge or Platform Avoiding loop)

=== Infrastructure ===
All signals in the vicinity of Spa Road junction are 4 aspect colour light signals. The signalling method is track circuit block, controlled by London Bridge signalling centre which is located nearby, adjacent to platform 16 at London Bridge station.

=== The collision point ===
The Thameslink train was approaching London Bridge from New Cross Gate on the Up Fast line of the Brighton Main Line, and had been signalled to cross on to the Up Passenger Loop of the South Eastern Main Line at Spa Road junction. The Connex South Eastern train was approaching Spa Road from New Cross and had received the correct signalling sequence of a Preliminary Caution (two yellow aspect signal) and Caution (single yellow aspect signal) prior to L154 (the signal protecting the junction) being at Danger. However, the driver did not respond to the signals, and failed stop his train at the Danger signal, continuing until his train collided with the Thameslink train at the trailing points.

== Rolling stock ==
The Thameslink train was an eight-coach train consisting of two coupled Class 319 four-coach electric multiple units (EMUs).

The Connex South Eastern was also an eight-coach train consisting of a four-coach Class 411 (411602) EMU coupled with a four-coach Class 423 EMU. The Class 411 unit was repaired and refurbished at Eastleigh Works, and therefore became the only class 411 EMU in Connex South Eastern livery.

== Investigation ==
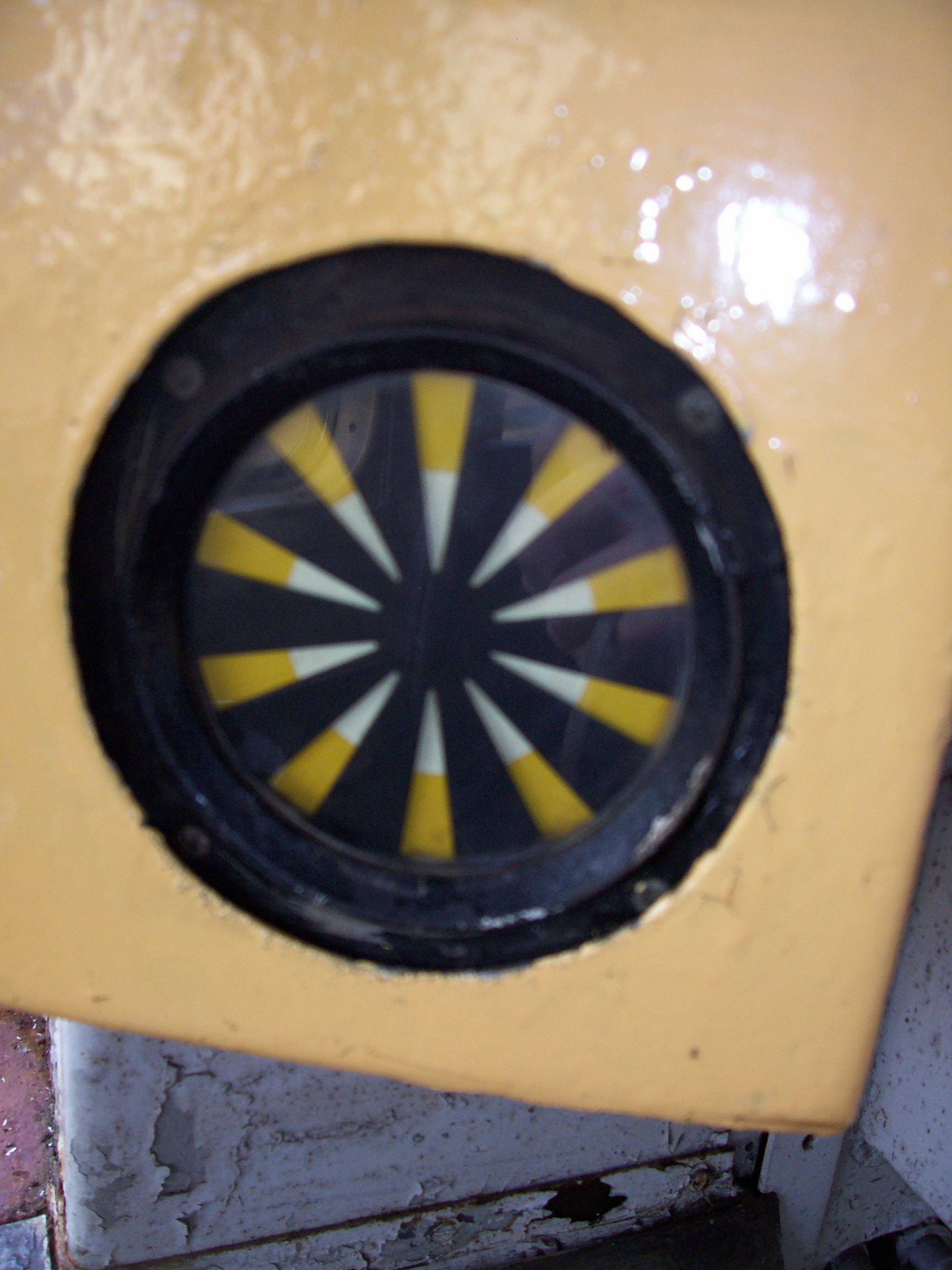
AWS "Sunflower" indicator showing caution

The Health and Safety Executive (HSE) concluded that the accident was caused by the Connex train passing a signal at danger (red). The HSE concluded that this was probably due to human error as no evidence of fault or malfunction was found in any equipment tested.

The investigation of the accident found "deficiencies" in the training and experience of staff in dealing with emergency situations. The cause of the accident was concluded to be driver error due to poor staff training.

One anomaly was that the "Sunflower" display in the cab of the Connex train was showing the all-black "clear" indication (meaning that the last signal which had been passed was displaying a green aspect). However the HSE report concluded that the Automatic Warning System (AWS) on both trains was probably working correctly, and that the shock of the collision had caused the electro-mechanical indicator to change. In any case, even if the AWS had given a wrong indication this would not have absolved the driver of the Connex train of his duty to observe and obey the signals.

The conclusion was that the Train Protection & Warning System might have stopped or at least slowed the Connex train down if it had been installed. The Railway Safety Regulations 1999 were introduced in the August, which stipulated that train protection must be implemented throughout the network by the end of 2003. The regulations stopped short of requiring Automatic Train Protection (ATP) to be installed.
