= British Rail Class 319 =

British electric passenger train

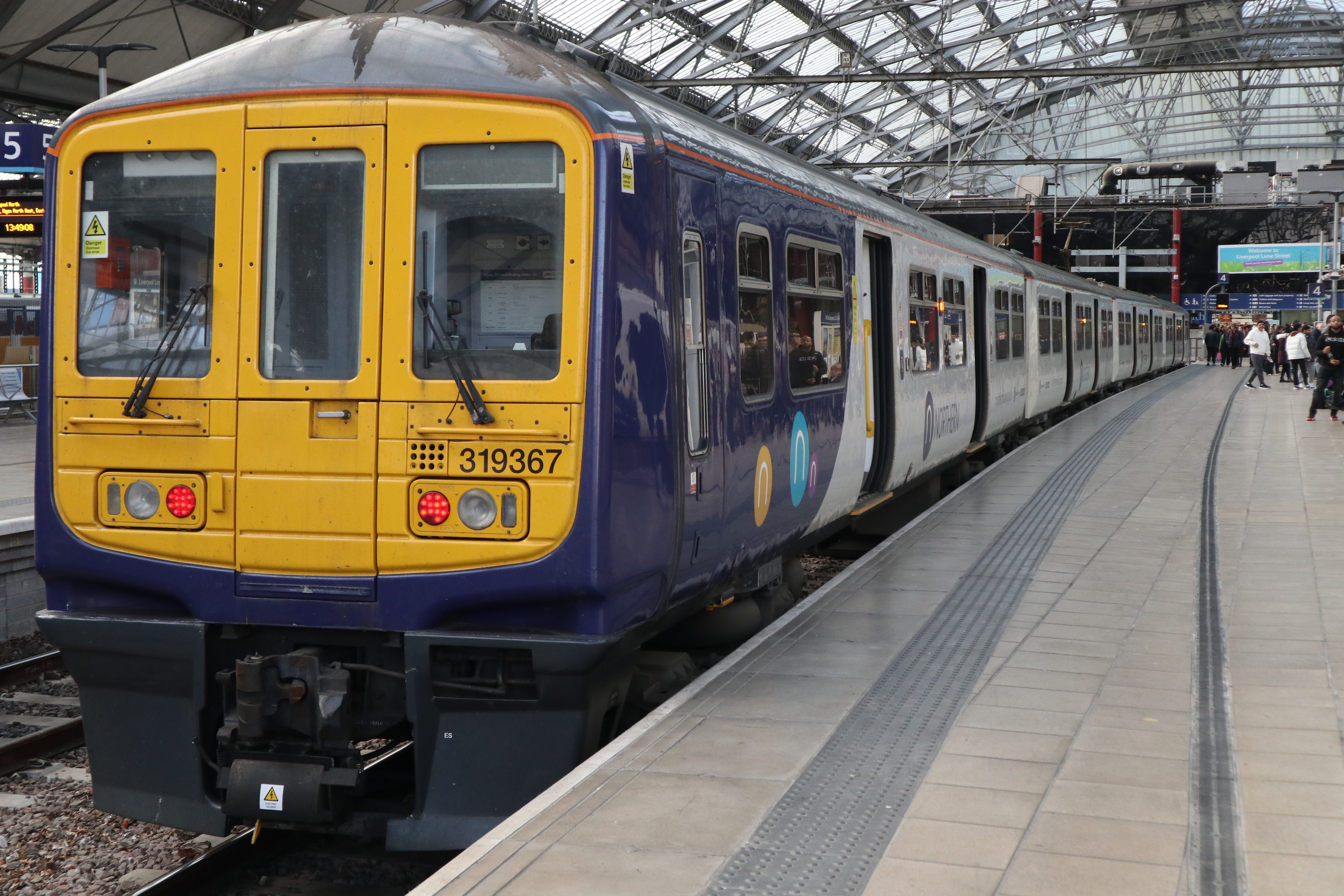
- Northern Trains Class 319 at Liverpool Lime Street

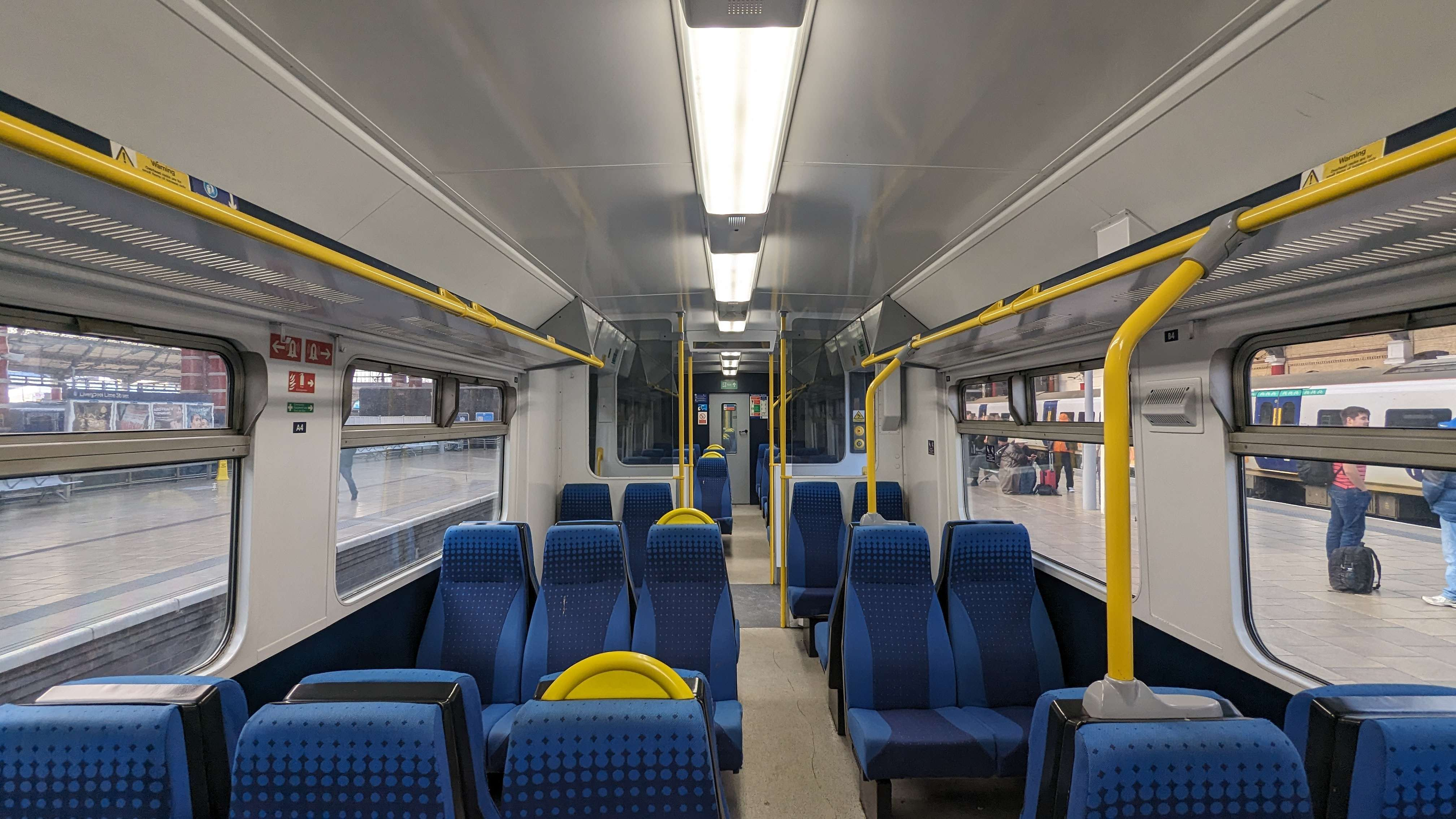
- The refurbished interior of a Northern Trains Class 319
- In service: 1988–present
- Manufacturer: British Rail Engineering Limited
- Built at: Holgate Road Works, York
- Family name: BR Second Generation (Mark 3)
- Replaced: Class 317; Class 321
- Constructed: 1987–1988, 1990
- Refurbished: 1996–1999
- Number built: 86
- Number in service: 3; (plus 2 converted to Cl. 768, 35 to Cl. 769, and 2 to Cl. 799)
- Number scrapped: 39
- Successor: Class 331; Class 387; Class 700; Class 730
- Formation: 4 cars per 319/0 unit: DTSO(A)-MSO-TSOL-DTSO(B); 4 cars per 319/1 unit: DTCO-MSO-TSOL-DTSO
- Diagram: 319/0 DTSO(A) vehs.: EE233; 319/0 MSO vehs.: EC209; 319/0 TSOL vehs.: EH234; 319/0 DTSO(B) vehs.: EE234; 319/1 DTCO vehs.: EE310; 319/1 MSO vehs.: EC214; 319/1 TSOL vehs.: EH238; 319/1 DTSO vehs.: EE240
- Fleet numbers: As built: 319001–319060; 319161–319186; Post-1999: 319001–319013; 319214–319220; 319361–319386; 319421–319460
- Capacity: 319/0 as-built: 316 seats; 319/1 as-built: 272 seats (16 first-class, 256 standard)
- Owner: Porterbrook
- Operator: Rail Operations Group

Specifications
- Car body construction: Steel
- Car length: DT vehs.: 19.830 m (65 ft 0.7 in); Others: 19.920 m (65 ft 4.3 in)
- Width: 2.816 m (9 ft 2.9 in)
- Height: 3.774 m (12 ft 4.6 in)
- Doors: Double-leaf sliding pocket, each 1.010 m (3 ft 3.8 in) wide (2 per side per car)
- Wheelbase: Over bogie centres: 14.170 m (46 ft 5.9 in)
- Maximum speed: 100 mph (161 km/h)
- Weight: 319/0 units as-built: DTSO(A) vehs.: 28.2 t (27.8 long tons; 31.1 short tons); MSO vehs.: 49.2 t (48.4 long tons; 54.2 short tons); TSO vehs.: 31.0 t (30.5 long tons; 34.2 short tons); DTSO(B) vehs.: 28.1 t (27.7 long tons; 31.0 short tons)
- Axle load: Route Availability 1
- Traction system: GTO thyristor
- Traction motors: 4 × GEC G315BZ
- Power output: 990 kW (1,330 hp)
- Electric systems: 25 kV 50 Hz AC overhead; 750 V DC third rail
- Current collection: Pantograph (AC); Contact shoe (DC)
- UIC classification: 2′2′+Bo′Bo′+2′2′+2′2′
- Bogies: Powered: BREL P7-4; Unpowered: BREL T3-7
- Minimum turning radius: 70.4 m (231 ft 0 in)
- Braking systems: Electro-pneumatic (disc); (Westinghouse 3-step)
- Safety systems: AWS; TPWS
- Coupling system: Tightlock
- Multiple working: Within class
- Track gauge: 1,435 mm (4 ft 8 1/2 in) standard gauge

The British Rail Class 319 is an electric multiple unit passenger train built by British Rail Engineering Limited's Holgate Road carriage works for use on north–south cross-London services. These dual-voltage trains are capable of operating on 25 kV 50 Hz from AC overhead wires or 750 V DC from a third rail.

Built in two batches in 1987–88 and 1990, the units were primarily used on the then-new Thameslink service from Bedford to Brighton and various other destinations south of London. The majority of the fleet remained in use on the Thameslink route after its reshaping and privatisation in 1997. Some of the fleet was also used by Connex South Central and latterly Southern on various services operating out of London Victoria, including flagship expresses to Brighton.

A total of 44 sets were converted to Class 769s which is a mixture of Bi-mode multiple units (BMU) and Tri-mode multiple units. Two Class 319s have been converted to a tri-mode Class 799 which runs on hydrogen and electricity with the 25 kV AC and 750 V DC equipment retained.

== Description ==
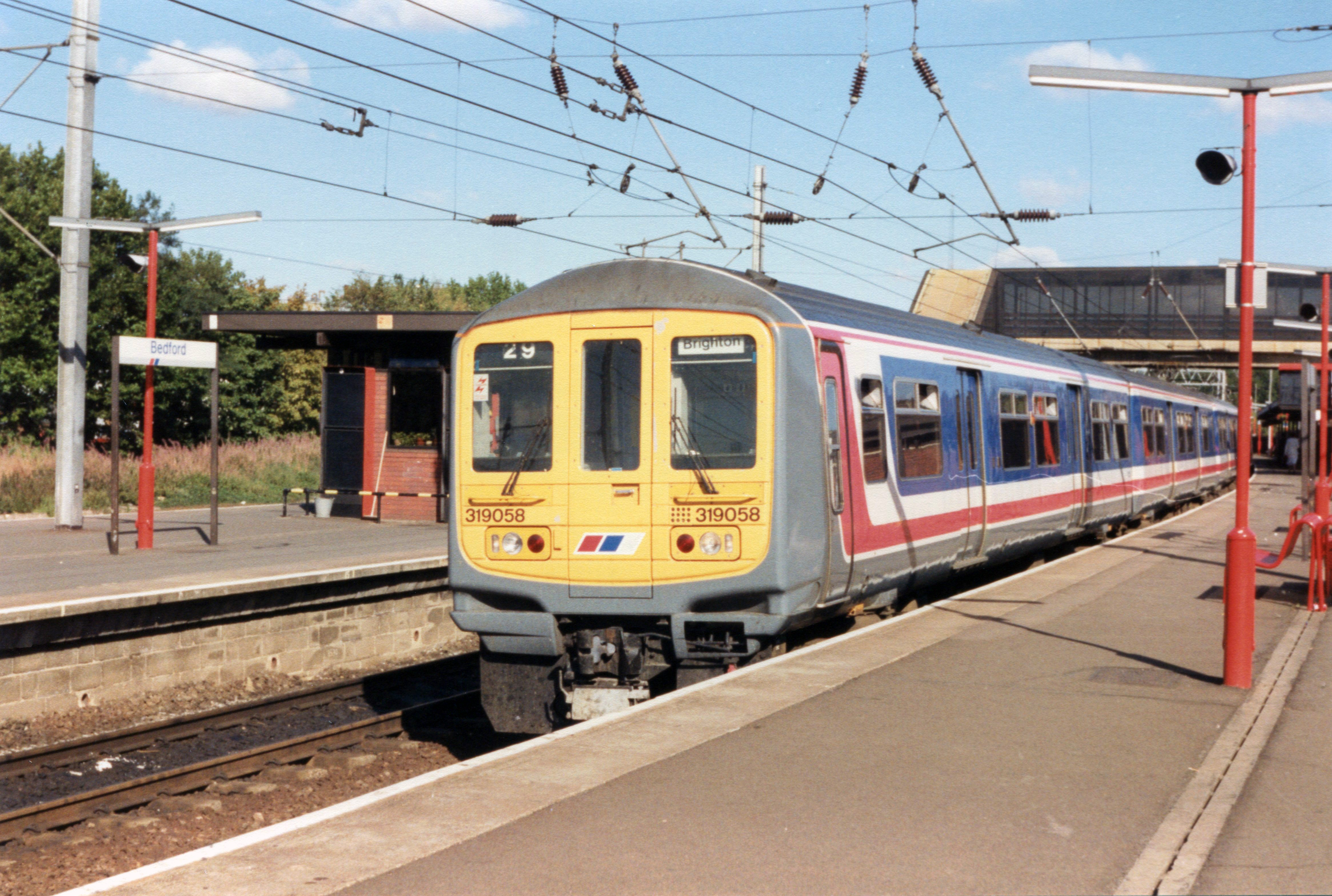
Network SouthEast Class 319/0 at Bedford

Plans for north–south railways across central London go back to the 1940s at least, when there were several proposals in the 1943 County of London Plan which were developed further in a following report in 1946.

The Victoria line, which opened in stages from 1968, had been one of the routes suggested in these plans. Another involved reviving the disused route via the Snow Hill tunnel between Farringdon and Blackfriars for passenger trains, and this began to be considered seriously in the 1970s. The British Railways Board then developed plans for what would become Thameslink, and the newly created business sector of Network SouthEast inherited responsibility for the project in 1986. Services between Bedford, Farringdon, Blackfriars and Brighton began under the Thameslink brand in 1988.

As the Thameslink service was to use a route with 25 kV AC OHLE north of Farringdon and along the branch to Moorgate, and 750 V DC third-rail electrification south of Farringdon, the Class 319 trains were equipped for dual-voltage operation. They were also the first British Rail units to use modern thyristor control in place of a camshaft and resistor bank.

The body shape of the Class 319 is slightly different from contemporary electric units due to restrictions in the loading gauge in Kings Cross Tunnel. They were also required to have emergency end doors in the cabs, due to the twin single-bore layout of Smithfield tunnel preventing normal train evacuation.

Two sub-classes of Class 319 units, 60 Class 319/0s and 26 Class 319/1s, were originally built. Over the years, the units have been refurbished, creating five sub-classes, of which four still exist.

Class 321 passenger units and Class 325 postal units were developed from the Class 319 design, using similar traction equipment and the same steel body design, with revised cab designs. The 325 units used a Networker style cab design.

=== Class 319/0 ===
The first batch of 60 units, built in 1987 and 1988, was classified as Class 319/0. Units were numbered in the range 319001–060 and had a maximum speed of 100 mph (161 km/h). Each unit consisted of four steel carriages: two outer driving trailers, an intermediate motor with a roof-mounted Stone Faiveley AMBR pantograph and four DC GEC G315BZ traction motors (two per bogie), and an intermediate trailer housing a compressor, motor alternator and two toilets. Seating was standard-class only, in 2+3 layout.

The technical description of the unit formation is DTSO(A)+MSO+TSO+DTSO(B). Individual vehicles were numbered as follows:

- 77291–77381 (odd) and 77431–77457 (odd) — DTSO(A)
- 62891–62936 and 62961–62974 — MSO
- 71772–71817 and 71866–71879 — TSO
- 77290–77380 (even) and 77430–77456 (even) — DTSO(B)

Vehicles were numbered in two ranges, corresponding to units 319001–046 and 319047–060. The gaps in the number series (e.g. 77382–77429) were filled by the Class 442 units, built around the same period.

The DTSO(B) vehicles originally featured a lockable sliding door between the driving cab and the first set of power doors and tip-up longitudinal seating to enable parcels to be carried securely. This facility was rarely used and the sliding door was removed.

Unit 319011 is the only remaining member of the 319/0 subclass; all others were converted to Class 319/2 or Class 319/4 in the late 1990s, or Class 768s Class 769s or Class 799s in the 2010s or scrapped.

=== Class 319/1 ===
Built in 1990, this second batch of 26 units was numbered in the range 319161–186. The formation of the second batch of sets was similar to that of the earlier units, with the addition of first-class seating at one end of the train for use on longer-distance Bedford to Brighton services. Like the first batch, standard-class seating was of a 2+3 layout. First-class seating was in 2+2 layout.

Units were formed in the arrangement DTCO+MSO+TSO+DTSO. Individual vehicles were numbered as follows:

- 77459–77497 (odd) and 77971–77983 (odd) — DTCO
- 63043–63062 and 63093–63098 — MSO
- 71929–71948 and 71979–71984 — TSO
- 77458–77496 (even) and 77972–77984 (even) — DTSO

Vehicles were numbered in two ranges, corresponding to units 319161–180 and 319181–186. A more modern Brecknell Willis high speed pantograph was also fitted.

All were converted to Class 319/3 in the late 1990s.

=== Class 319/2 ===
In 1997, seven of the Class 319/0 sets were converted especially for use on Connex South Central express services between London Victoria and Brighton. Work carried out at Railcare Wolverton included new, lower-density seating, a disabled toilet, and a special 'lounge' seating area in the saloon space below the pantograph in the MSO, where stowage for a refreshment trolley and a small serving counter were also fitted.

Units involved were renumbered from 319014–020 to 319214–220. They retained their low-density layout, but the lounge area was replaced by standard seating following their return to use on Thameslink services.

=== Class 319/3 ===
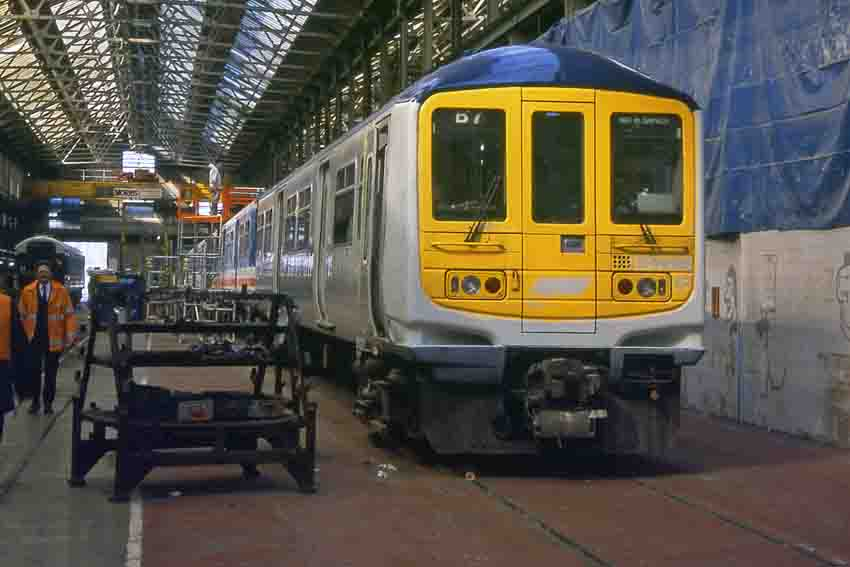
BR class 319 unit in Eastleigh Works

In the period 1997–99, Thameslink arranged for all of its 319/1 units to be converted at Eastleigh Works for use on the shorter-distance Luton to Sutton/Wimbledon services, then known as 'Thameslink CityMetro'. These units lost their first-class seating and were renumbered into the 319/3 series. They were painted in a navy-blue and yellow livery at this time.

Various refurbishments have taken place since 1999, including:

- Minor refresh by Thameslink including new seat covers between 2003 and 2005
- Relivery and interior refresh by Railcare Wolverton for First Capital Connect completed in 2010
- New passenger information system, new seat covers and an internal and external repaint for units transferring to Northern Rail and similar work for those remaining on Thameslink in the interim, starting in 2014.

=== Class 319/4 ===
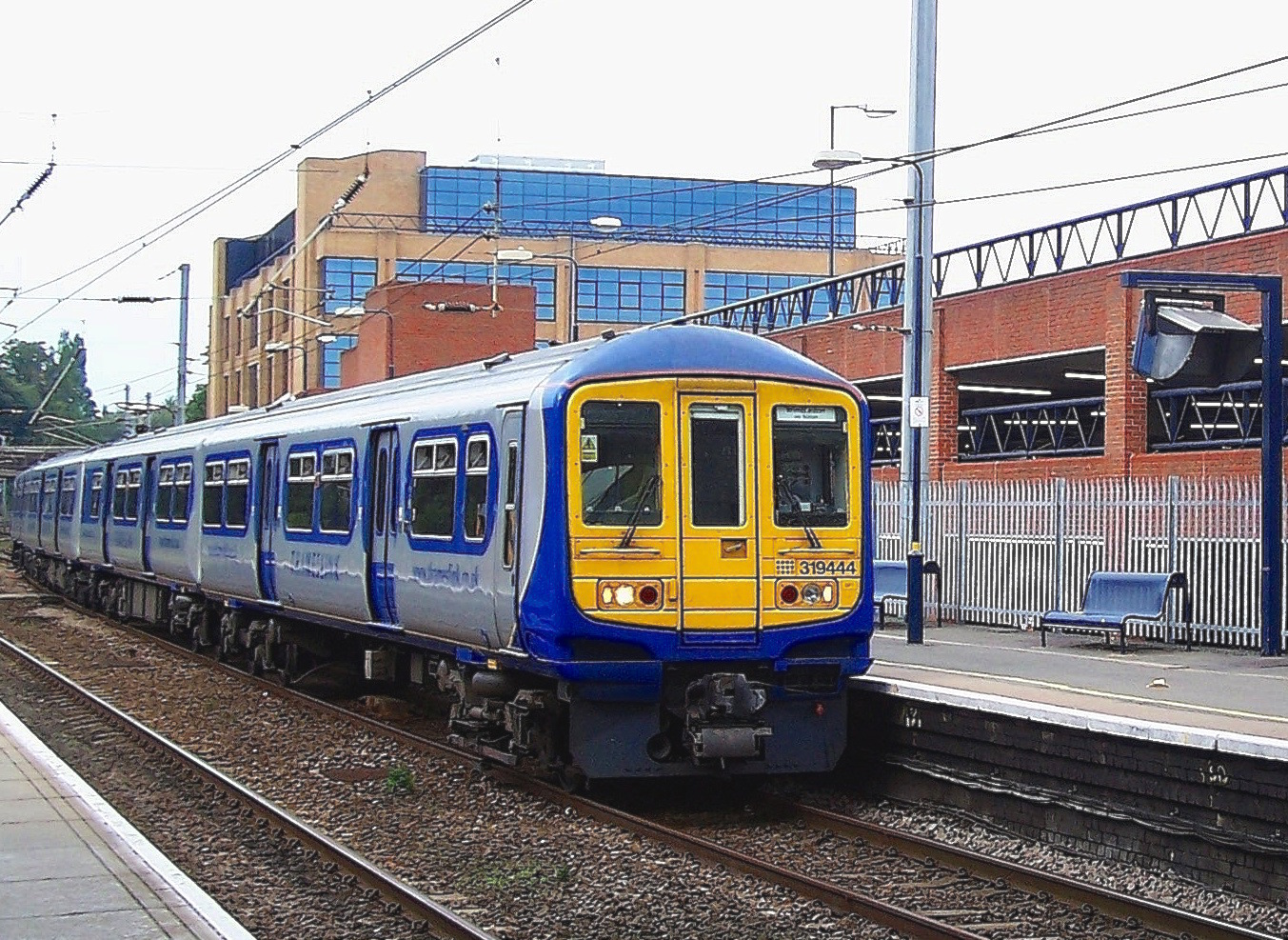
Thameslink Class 319/4 arrives at St Albans City

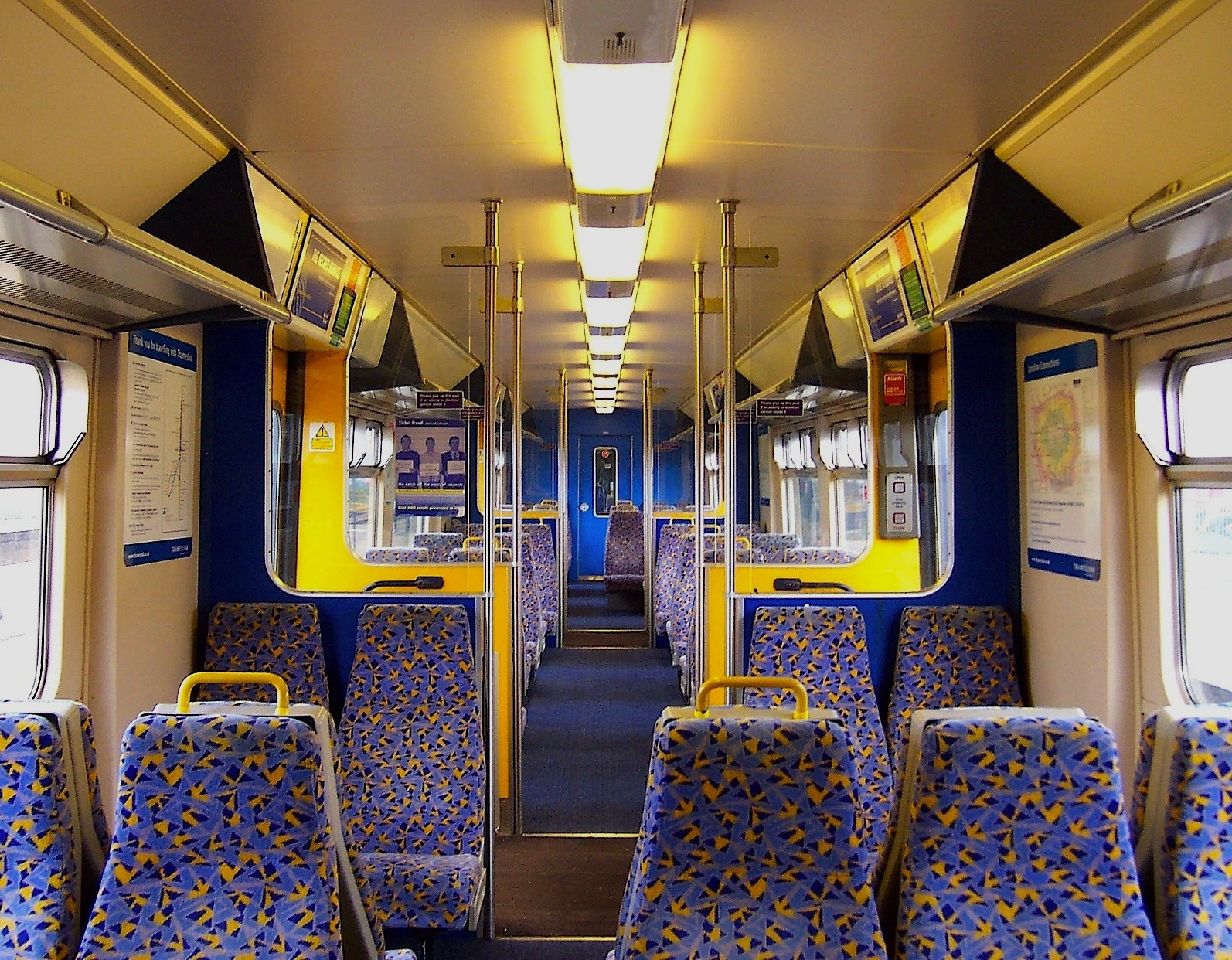
The refurbished Thameslink interior of a Class 319/4

Units 319021-060 were refurbished for Thameslink at Railcare Wolverton from 1997 to 1998. Work included the installation of a first-class compartment at one end, in the DTSO(A) vehicle and the removal of some seating in the centre of each vehicle to give 2+2 layout. Cosmetic improvements included new carpets and seat coverings, as well as application of the navy-blue Thameslink livery.

Upon completion, these units were renumbered as 319421-460 and moved on to the Bedford to Brighton service, branded as 'Thameslink Cityflier'.

From 2003 to 2005, during the Thameslink blockade, some minor interior updating took place such as recovering seats with an updated Thameslink moquette. First-class compartments were refurbished with new carpet, retrimmed seats and chrome-plated heater panels, apart from unit 319444, which retained its 1997-designed interior.

A later refresh was unveiled by the then-new operator First Capital Connect on 26 October 2006. Unit 319425 was renamed Transforming Travel for the occasion and showcased the following improvements:

- Emergency brake pressure increased to the +12% G standard, giving an extra 1 Bar brake cylinder pressure in emergency
- Emergency brake 'timeout' period reduced from 2 minutes to 20 seconds
- DC traction motors rewound to improve reliability
- Improved motor control hardware with a new Remote Communications Frame
- New 'easy to clean' flooring
- Retrimmed seats into the First Capital Connect moquette
- Some seats in standard class were removed and vertical luggage stacks installed in their place; a further two seats were removed in the TSO vehicle to allow easier access to the toilet
- Repainted dado side panels and wall ends
- Existing stanchions painted pink
- New stanchions leading from some seats to the overhead luggage rack to provide standing passengers with something to hold on to and more support
- Improved, brighter fluorescent lighting diffusers

The refresh took place at Railcare Wolverton works and also featured both a mechanical overhaul (under the solebar) and a full exterior relivery, again in vinyl. Some Class 319/4 units had their Stone Faiveley AMBR air and spring pantograph replaced by the more modern Brecknell Willis High Speed air-only pantograph design.

== Future operations ==
=== Rail Operations Group/Orion ===
Orion High Speed Logistics is planning to launch its trial service conveying parcels and light freight with the Midlands to Mossend likely to be the debut flow. Arlington Fleet Services at Eastleigh Works is modifying the interiors of the units to accommodate roller cages for parcels, with the aim of operating primarily under electric power but with the 769s using their diesel engines to act as tractor units for the 319s over non-electrified routes. Orion unveiled its first modified 319, No 319373, at Eastleigh in August 2020, and from 18 to 20 January 2021 showcased the unit to potential partners and customers at Maritime Transport's Birmingham Intermodal Freight Terminal at Birch Coppice. The first of ten Class 768s was scheduled to enter service in 2021, but this was put on hold in 2022 when the Brush Traction facility in Loughborough, which was handling the conversions, was closed by Wabtec. They were placed into indefinite secure storage thereafter.

== Former operations ==
=== London Midland/London Northwestern Railway ===
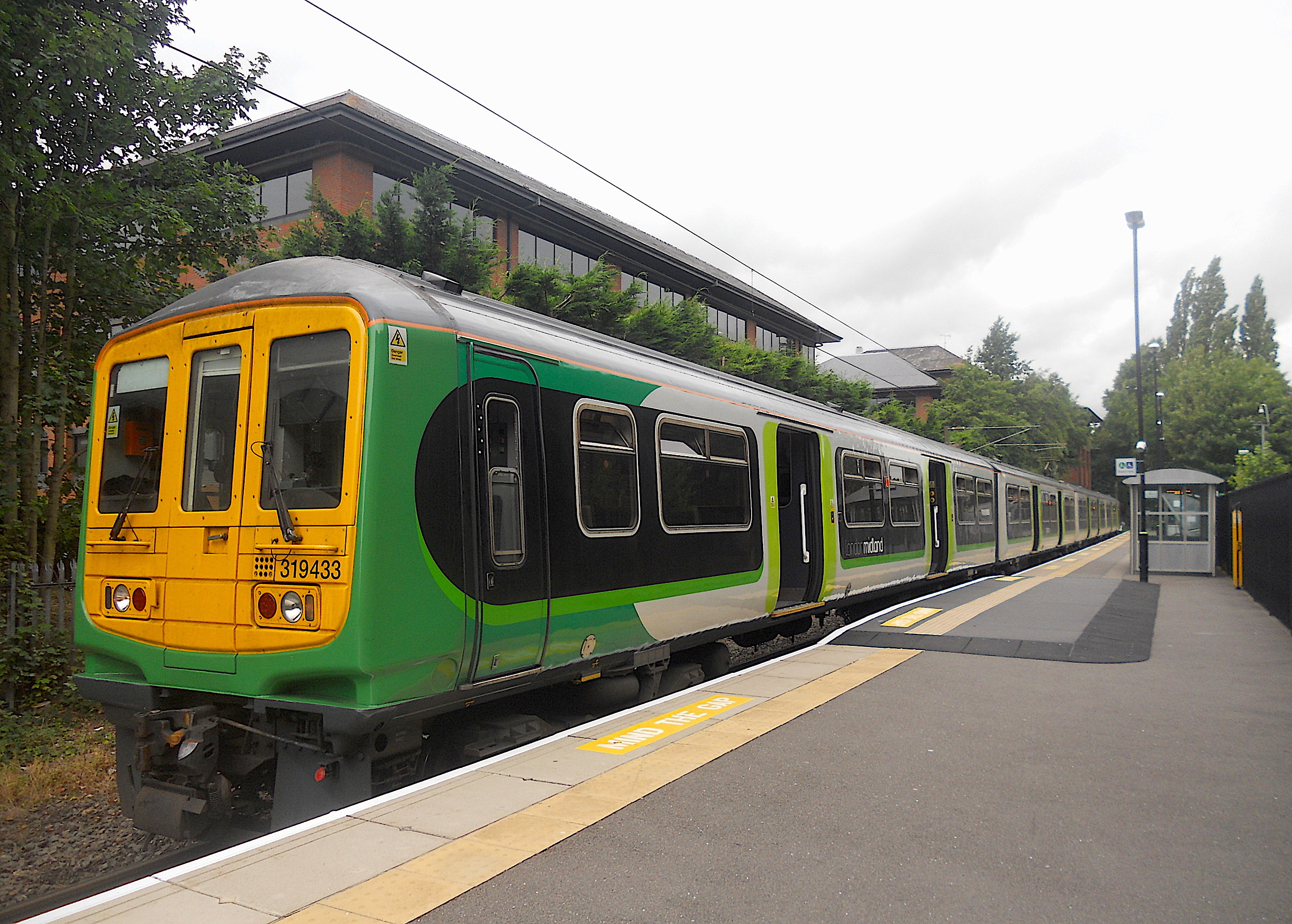
London Midland Class 319/4 at St Albans Abbey

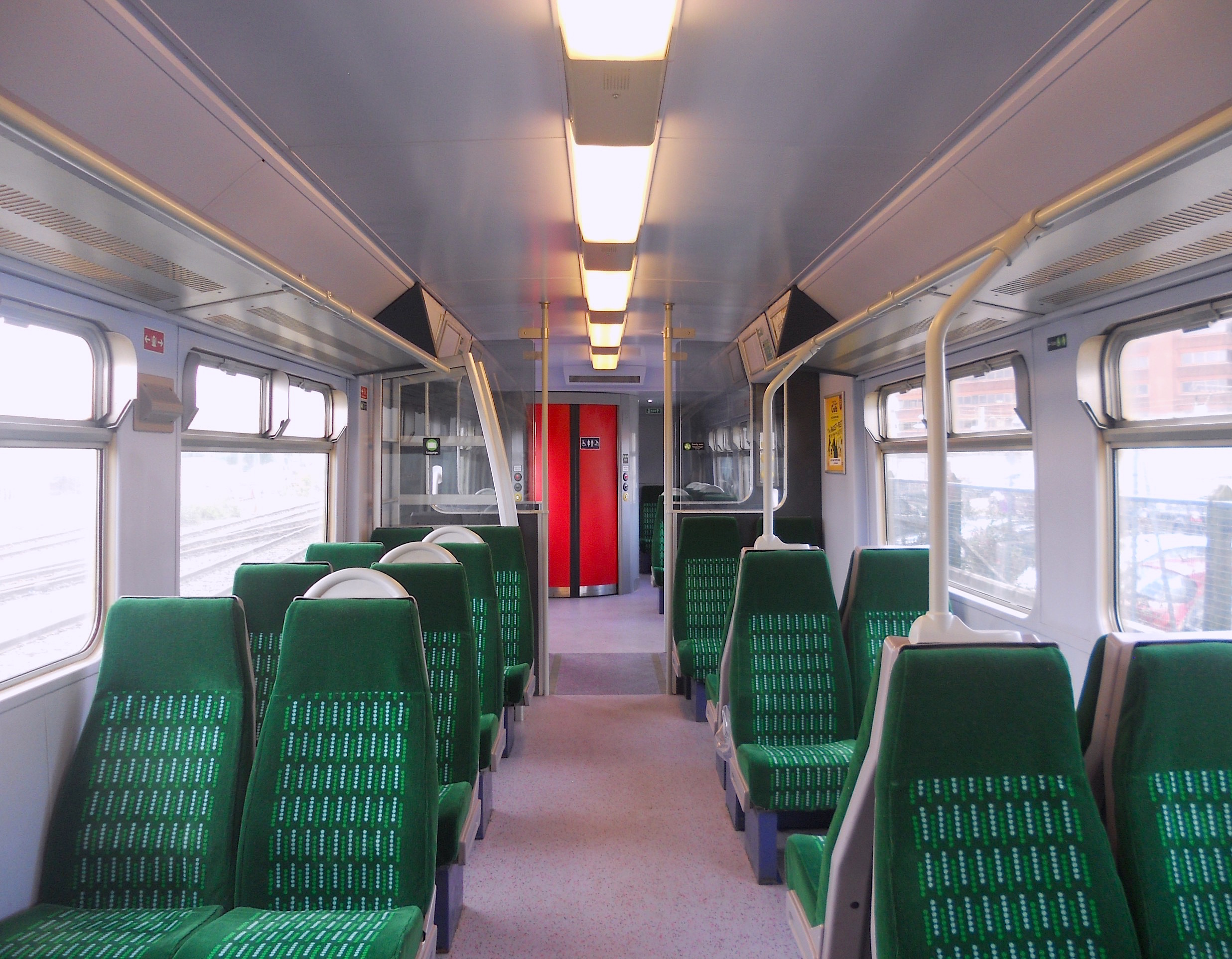
The London Midland refreshed interior of a Class 319

Seven units were transferred to London Midland in 2015 to operate the Watford Junction to St Albans service and some peak West Coast Main Line services out of London Euston. These replaced the seven Class 321 units that transferred to Abellio ScotRail. In April 2017, one of the five Class 319/4 units, 319455, was swapped for 319433, with the latter receiving a light refresh and a repaint before entering service.

In December 2017, West Midlands Trains took over the operation of the West Midlands rail franchise, with the seven Class 319 units initially leased by London Midland transferring to the new operator.

A week after the start of the new franchise, West Midlands Trains leased additional Class 319 units, which had previously operated with Thameslink. These extra units enabled the company to take their Class 350/1 and 350/3 Desiro units out of service for their planned refurbishment.

All of the Class 319 units operated by London Northwestern Railway were withdrawn on 27 November 2023 after being replaced by Class 730 units.

=== Thameslink ===
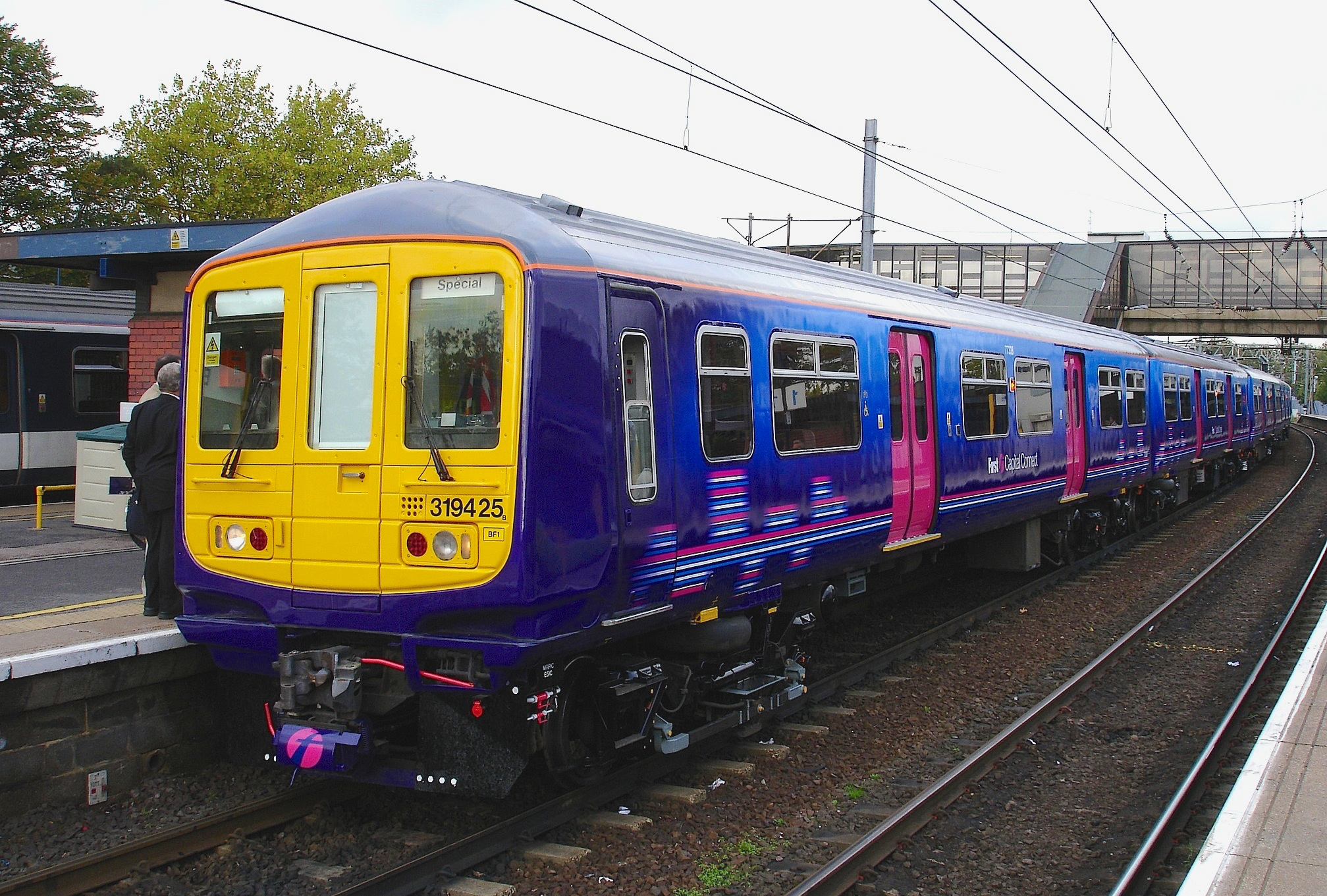
The first refurbished Class 319/4 for First Capital Connect was 319425, seen here at Bedford

With the first units entering service for Thameslink in 1988, Class 319s were a mainstay on the Thameslink network for almost three decades. In early 2015, the first batch of units were withdrawn from the network after being displaced by Class 387 units.

Twenty Class 319/3s transferred to Northern Rail for newly electrified lines in the North West, with the first units entering service in March 2015 after a light refurbishment. A further seven units left the network in 2015, transferring to London Midland to replace their Class 321 units, which had transferred to Abellio ScotRail.

Since the introduction of the new Class 700 units in June 2016, Class 319s departed the network as new trains have entered service. A further batch of twelve units transferred to the North West of England for service with Arriva Rail North, with the remainder being placed into storage at Long Marston. The six remaining Class 319 units were withdrawn from Thameslink service on 27 August 2017, around 30 years after their initial introduction to service.

Following their withdrawal, a number of additional units were allocated to the North West and the West Midlands to boost capacity.

=== Northern Rail/Arriva Rail North/Northern Trains ===
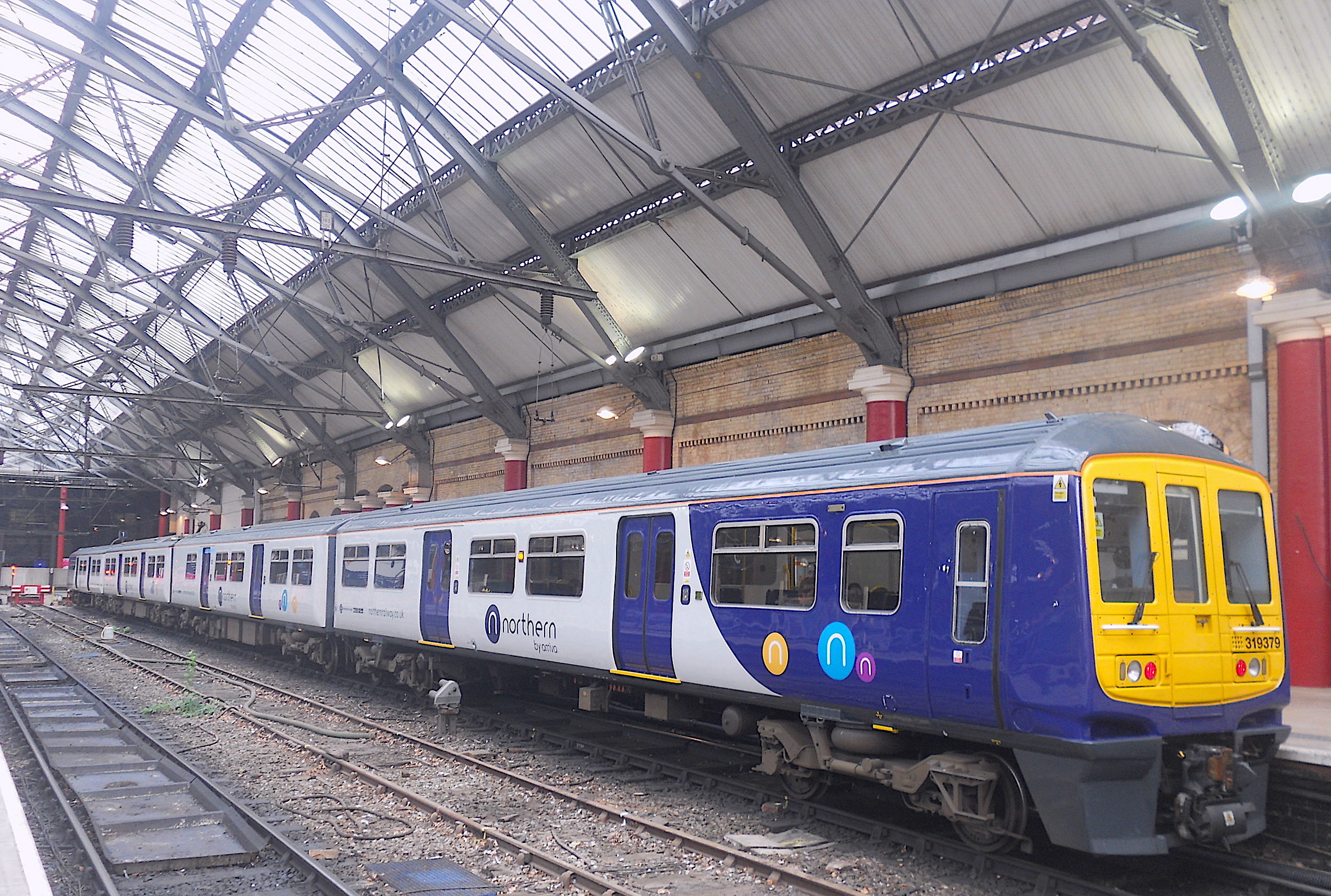
Arriva Rail North Class 319/3 at Liverpool Lime Street

To operate on newly electrified routes in the North West of England, Northern Rail received twenty Class 319/3 units after they were replaced by brand new Class 387 units. The first Northern Rail service to be operated by Class 319s was the Liverpool Lime Street to Manchester Airport via Chat Moss service on 5 March 2015. From 17 May 2015, the Liverpool Lime Street to Wigan North Western via Huyton route followed suit.

The first batch of units which transferred to Northern Rail underwent a light refurbishment at Wolverton Works and were repainted into a dedicated Northern Electrics livery, although all of these units had been repainted into Northern's livery by mid 2018.

Other services operated by Class 319s included Crewe to Liverpool via Earlestown, Liverpool to Warrington Bank Quay and Liverpool to Wigan North Western and Blackpool North. In April 2016, these units transferred to the then-new franchise operator Arriva Rail North, who later leased an additional fifteen Class 319s to operate on newly electrified services from Blackpool North, with these commencing in May 2018.

In December 2016, it was announced that some 319 were to be converted to Class 769 Flex bi-mode multiple units by Brush Traction at Loughborough, and were planned to enter service with Arriva Rail North in 2018.

In August 2019, it was confirmed that all 319s were planned to leave Arriva Rail North to be replaced by 17 of the 26 Class 323 units operated by West Midlands Trains. This was expected to occur once new rolling stock is in operation with West Midlands Trains. However instead the Class 319s were replaced by Class 331 units.

On 1 March 2020, following the collapse of previous operator Arriva Rail North, the Northern 319s transferred to new government-owned operator Northern Trains.

In September 2023 it was reported that Northern Trains planned to withdraw its Class 319 fleet by the end of 2023, later delayed until January 2024.

Northern Trains withdrew its Class 319 fleet on 2 January 2024.

=== Southern ===
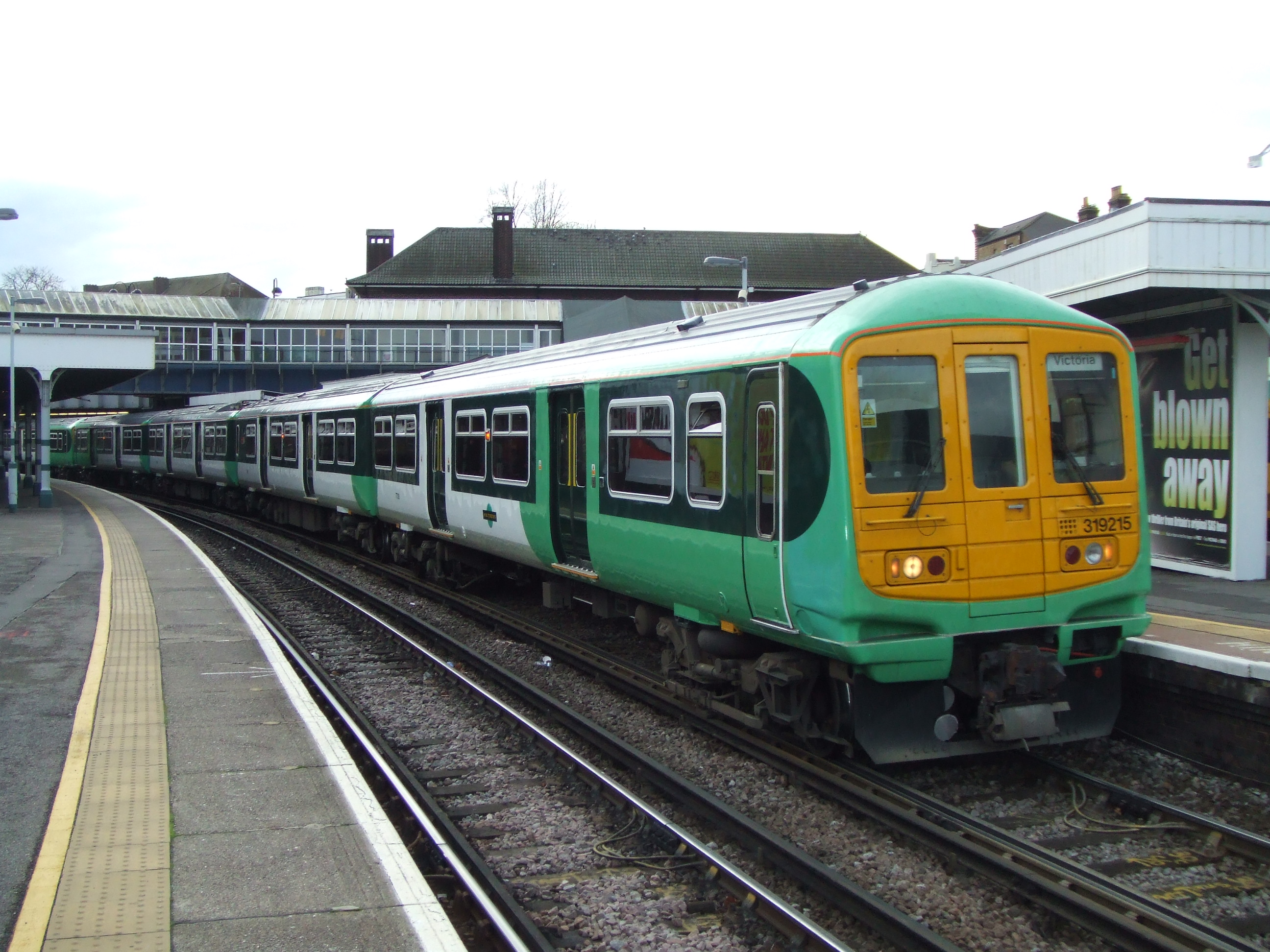
Southern Class 319 at Sutton

When British Rail was privatised in the mid-1990s, the first 13 units (319001–013) were used for outer-suburban services by Connex South Central, with some temporarily losing their 25 kV AC overhead equipment.

Seven more of the Class 319/0 sets (319014–020) were refurbished and dedicated to express services between London Victoria and Brighton, before later finding work on peak-only London Victoria to Guildford via West Croydon and London Victoria to Horsham via Three Bridges services. The dual-voltage capability was also used to introduce new services linking Rugby and Gatwick Airport via the West Coast and West London Lines in the 1990s.

Successor company Southern continued to operate the fleet and reliveried it into its own colour scheme. It later went on to sublease Class 319/0 units to First Capital Connect for use on the Thameslink route, before eventually releasing the entire fleet.

== Notable units ==
Units 319008 Cheriton and 319009 Coquelles are notable for two reasons:

- On 10 December 1993, they travelled through the Channel Tunnel from Sandling to Calais-Fréthun and back with a party of invited guests, after the construction consortium TransManche Link (who were responsible for the construction of the Tunnel) had transferred responsibility for operations and management over to Eurotunnel. Their pantographs were modified at Selhurst Depot beforehand to account for the higher OHL height at Cheriton and in the tunnel. For the subsequent "Folkestone 1994" event on 7 May 1994, which saw the first paying members of the public taken into the tunnel by train. On 26 March 1994 units 319008 and 319009 were named Cheriton and Coquelles respectively at Victoria and plaques adorned with the Union Flag and Tricolore were installed on their motor carriages. Cheriton was transferred to KeolisAmey Wales where it was used on the Valley Lines after release by Thameslink, whilst Coquelles has been transferred for use with Rail Operations Group.
- On 26 March 1994, they set a record for the shortest London to Brighton journey time, at 37 minutes 57 seconds. This record stood until 2005 when the "Speed Run" event, organised by Southern, using Class 377 units 377472 and 377474 set a slightly quicker record of 36 minutes 56 seconds.

=== Named units ===
Named units were as follows (all names now removed):

- 319001 Driver Mick Winnett (transferred from 319441))
- 319005 Partnership for Progress
- 319008 Cheriton
- 319009 Coquelles
- 319011 John Ruskin College
- 319013 The Surrey Hills
- 319030 Harlington Festival
- 319036 Save the Children Appeal
- 319055 Brixton Challenge
- 319215 London
- 319217 Brighton
- 319218 Croydon
- 319362 Northern Powerhouse
- 319364 Transforming Blackfriars
- 319365 Transforming Farringdon
- 319374 Bedford Cauldwell TMD
- 319425 Transforming Travel
- 319435 Adrian Jackson-Robbins Chairman 1987-2007 Association of Public Transport Users
- 319441 Driver Mick Winnett (transferred to 319001)
- 319444 City of St Albans
- 319446 St Pancras International
- 319448 Elstree Studios The Home of British Film and Television Production
- 319449 King's Cross Thameslink

=== Accidents ===
- In January 1999 a Connex South Eastern train formed of Class 423 and Class 411 slam door stock passed a signal at danger and collided with a pair of Thameslink Class 319s at Spa Road junction.
- In January 2014 unit 319369 operated by First Capital Connect was involved in a minor accident when the pantograph failed to lower at Farringdon station due to a technical fault. As a result, it struck the roof of Blackfriars station at about 09:55. No-one was injured and the train was later removed.

== Conversion to bi-mode and tri-mode ==
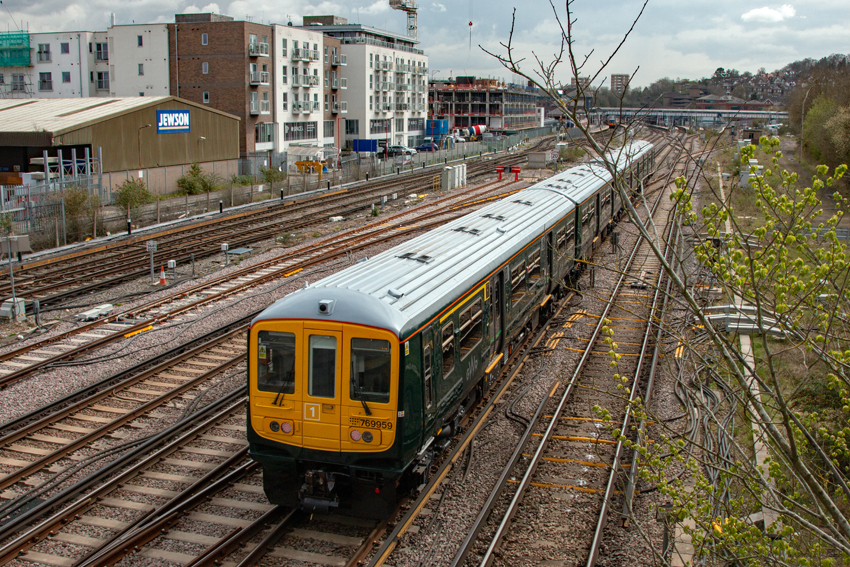
769959 on trials at Guildford

In December 2016, Arriva UK Trains subsidiary Northern and Porterbrook announced a plan to convert eight Class 319/4 electric multiple units to bi-mode units, to allow through working between electrified and non-electrified routes. These units, which were initially marketed as "Class 319 Flex" before being designated as Class 769 under TOPS, use two diesel powered alternators fitted under each of the driving trailer vehicles, to power the traction motors through the train's existing DC bus.

The modifications, which were carried out by Brush, will enable units to operate on electrified and non-electrified routes, using both 25 kV AC overhead wires and 750 V DC third rail. Each generator set consists of a MAN D2876 diesel engine driving an ABB alternator. The first units were expected to enter service with Arriva Rail North by spring 2018, but were delayed until 2019.

In July 2017, five units Class 769s were ordered by the Welsh Government for the Wales & Borders franchise, to enable Class 150 and Class 158 diesel multiple units to be released from service to undergo modifications to comply with PRM regulations, as well as allowing the company to increase its fleet capacity. Transport for Wales held an option for a further four, which they took up in November 2018.

Transport for Wales' allocation of nine Class 769s were converted from five Class 319/0 and four Class 319/4 units, with the former being the ones ordered under Arriva Trains Wales and the latter being the optional extras selected by KeolisAmey Wales. The first unit, 769002, was delivered to Cardiff Canton depot in March 2019. The class 769 first entered service in November 2020.

Transport for Wales Rail withdrew the last of its Class 769 fleet on 19 May 2023.

Other planned operators of the Class 769 included Great Western Railway. Great Western Railway's units were planned to retain their third-rail pick-up shoes.

The introduction of the Great Western Railway Tri-mode Class 769s was abandoned in December 2023.

In December 2018, Rail Operations Group (ROG) ordered two Class 769s that were in the process of being developed by Brush Traction from redundant Class 319s. However unlike the Class 769s that remained as passenger trains, ROG's Orion High Speed Trains subsidiary intends to operate them as parcel carriers from London Liverpool Street to London Gateway. In February 2020, a further three were ordered to allow services to be introduced the Midlands to Scotland via the West Coast Main Line. A further five has since been ordered. Originally to be classified as Class 769/5s, they were reclassified as the Class 768 before first was completed. Two Class 319s, 319001 and 319382, have been converted to a Class 799. They will run on hydrogen on non-electrified routes whilst retaining the existing 25 kV AC and 750 V DC equipment for electrified routes.

== Other uses ==
In 2020 GB Railfreight used a Class 319 in a trial of a parcel delivery service.

== Fleet details ==
| Class | Operator | Qty. | Year built | Cars per unit | Unit nos. | Notes |
|---|---|---|---|---|---|---|
| 319/0 | Converted to Class 799 | 1 | 1987–1988 | 4 | 319001 | Original fleet. |
| 319/0 | Converted to Class 769 | 5 | 1987–1988 | 4 | 319002–319003, 319006–319008 | Original fleet. |
| 319/0 | Scrapped | 4 | 1987–1988 | 4 | 319004, 319005, 319012, 319013 | Original fleet. |
| 319/0 | Converted to Class 768 | 2 | 1987–1988 | 4 | 319009, 319010 | Original fleet. |
| 319/0 | Rail Operations Group | 1 | 1987–1988 | 4 | 319011 | Original fleet. |
| 319/2 | Scrapped | 6 | 1987–1988 | 4 | 319214–319219 | Originally 319/0 units 319014–319020, reclassified as 319/2 during 1996–1997 refurbishment. |
| 319/2 | MOD | 1 | 1987–1988 | 4 | 319220 | Originally 319/0 units 319014–319020, reclassified as 319/2 during 1996–1997 refurbishment. |
| 319/3 | Stored | 1 | 1990 | 4 | 319371 | Originally 319/1 units 319161–319186, reclassified as 319/3 during 1997–1999 refurbishment. |
| 319/3 | Scrapped | 22 | 1990 | 4 | 319361–319370, 319372-319376, 319378-319379, 319381, 319383-319386 | Originally 319/1 units 319161–319186, reclassified as 319/3 during 1997–1999 refurbishment. |
| 319/3 | Rail Operations Group | 2 | 1990 | 4 | 319377, 319380 | Originally 319/1 units 319161–319186, reclassified as 319/3 during 1997–1999 refurbishment. |
| 319/3 | Converted to Class 799 | 1 | 1990 | 4 | 319382 | Originally 319/1 units 319161–319186, reclassified as 319/3 during 1997–1999 refurbishment. |
| 319/4 | Converted to Class 769 | 31 | 1987–1988 | 4 | 319421–319428, 319430–319432, 319434–319440, 319442–319450, 319452, 319456, 319458–319459 | Originally 319/0 units 319021–319060, reclassified as 319/4 during 1997–1998 refurbishment. |
| 319/4 | Rail Operations Group | 1 | 1987–1988 | 4 | 319441 | Originally 319/0 units 319021–319060, reclassified as 319/4 during 1997–1998 refurbishment. |
| 319/4 | Scrapped | 9 | 1987–1988 | 4 | 319429, 319433, 319439, 319451, 319453-319455 319457, 319460 | Originally 319/0 units 319021–319060, reclassified as 319/4 during 1997–1998 refurbishment. |

== Livery details ==
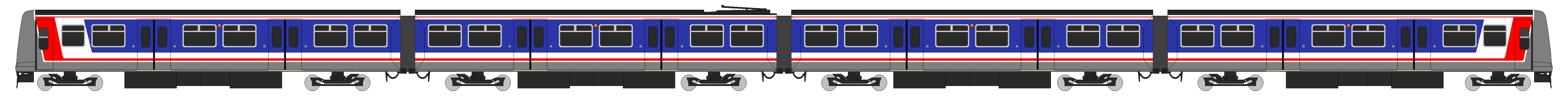
Network SouthEast livery 1987 – 1996
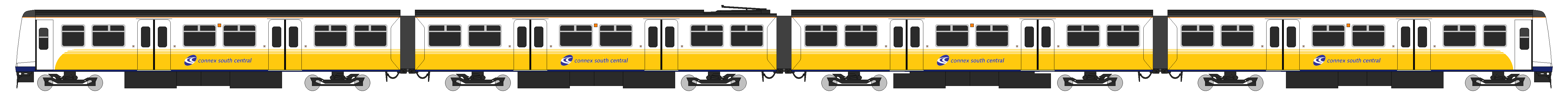
Connex South Central livery 1996 – 2001
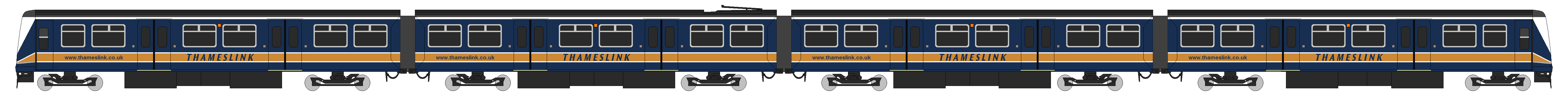
Thameslink livery 1996 – 2006
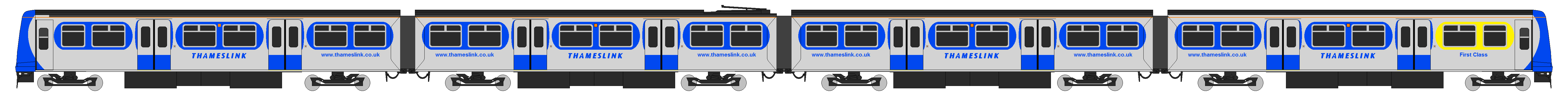
Thameslink livery 2004 – 2006
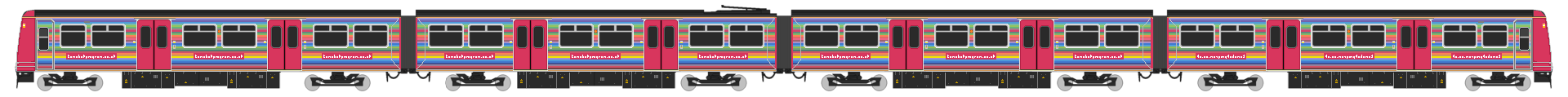
Thameslink Project Livery applied to 319364 & 319365 2007-2013
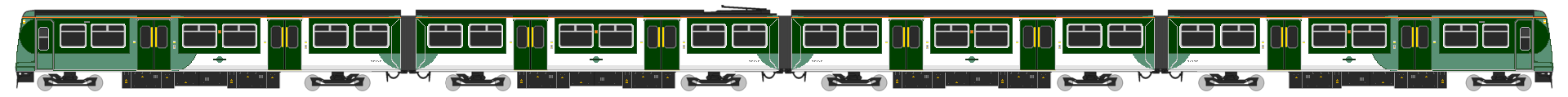
Southern livery 2001 – 2008
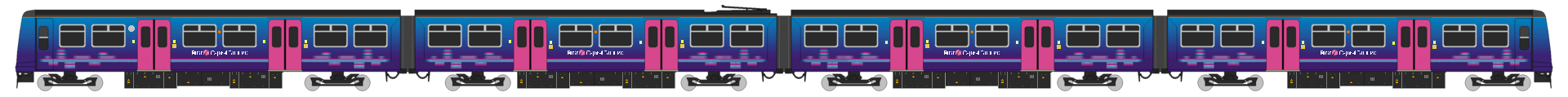
First Capital Connect livery 2006 – 2017
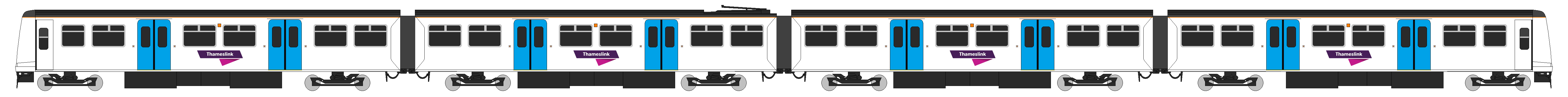
Thameslink Blue door livery 2014 – 2017
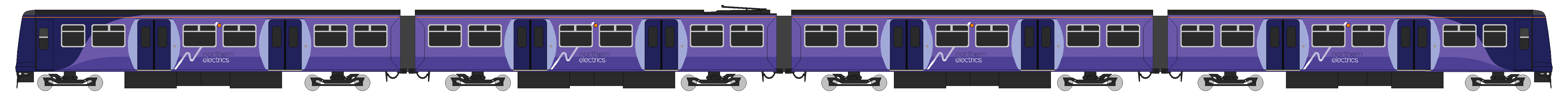
Northern Rail livery 2015 – 2016
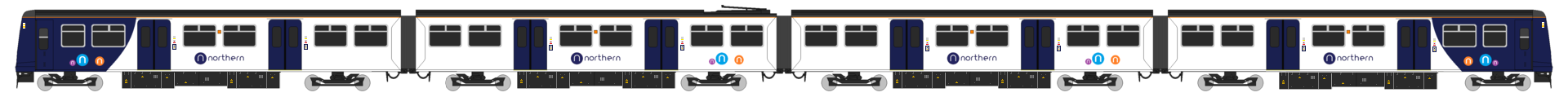
Northern livery 2017 – 2024
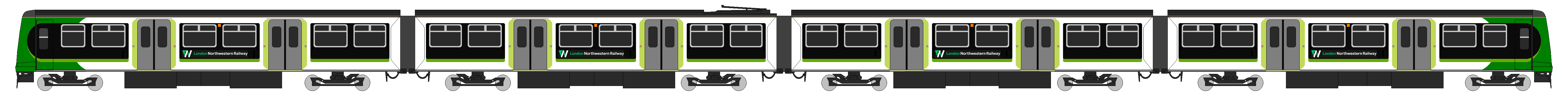
London Northwestern Railway livery 2017 – 2023
