= Porterbrook =

British rolling stock company

- Predecessor: British Rail
- Founded: March 1994
- Headquarters: Derby, England
- Area served: United Kingdom
- Products: Rolling stock leasing
- Parent: AIMCo (30%) Allianz Capital Partners (30%); Royal London (20%); EDF Invest (10%); Generation Capital (10%)
- Website: www.porterbrook.co.uk

Porterbrook is a British rolling stock company (ROSCO), created as part of the privatisation of British Rail. Together with Angel Trains and Eversholt Rail Group, it is one of the three original ROSCOs.

Porterbrook was established in March 1994 and was privatised via a management buyout during November 1995. In August 1997, it was acquired by the transport specialist Stagecoach at a far higher value. Two and a half years later, Stagecoach sold Porterbrook to the British banking group Abbey National. Prior to this, Porterbrook had entered the freight leasing market for the first time as well as the continental European rail leasing market; the latter activities were sold off in December 2004, resulting in the creation of CB Rail. On 27 October 2008, Porterbrook was purchased from Abbey National by a consortium of Antin Infrastructure Partners, Deutsche Bank and Lloyds TSB.

During the 2010s, Porterbrook engaged in various projects to overhaul or dispose of aging rolling stock. Some of its Class 319 electric multiple units were rebuilt as Class 769 bi-mode units to work on both electrified and non-electrified routes. In 2020, Porterbrook started a £55 million five-year programme to refurbish 214 Class 377 'Electrostar' EMUs operated by Southern. Furthermore, many of its Class 43 power cars, historically operated as a part of the Intercity 125, were sold or donated to other parties, along with its fleet of Class 90 electric locomotives.

== History ==
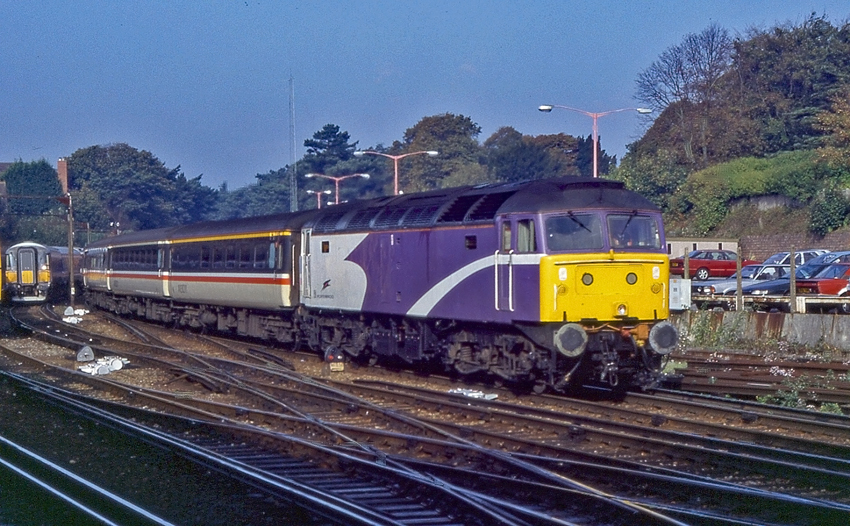
47817 in early Porterbrook livery

Porterbrook was established on 21 March 1994 as a subsidiary of British Rail in preparation for the privatisation of British Rail. It was named after the Porter Brook, a river that passed by British Rail's Sheffield offices (Specifically Sheaf House, adjacent to Sheffield railway station, which was demolished in late 2005 as part of a city centre regeneration project). In November 1995, Porterbrook was privatised via a management buyout.

In 1996, Porterbrook entered the freight leasing market though a deal to purchase and lease back 70 locomotives and 699 wagons from Freightliner. On 28 August 1996, the company was purchased by the transport conglomerate Stagecoach in exchange for £825 million; this deal was subject to considerable criticism for the low value returned to the taxpayer. On 20 April 2000, Stagecoach opted to sell Porterbrook to the British banking group Abbey National for a reported £1.44 billion.

Porterbrook established its own subsidiary to handle its European rail leasing activities; this was sold to a joint venture between Babcock & Brown and Bank of Scotland Corporate Europe during December 2004, creating CB Rail. At the time of the takeover, the subsidiary had leasing arrangements for 28 locomotives and 67 coaches.

On 27 October 2008, the business was purchased from Abbey National by a consortium of Antin Infrastructure Partners, Deutsche Bank and Lloyds TSB. The sale, which reportedly valued Porterbrook and its 6,014-strong rolling stock inventory at £2 billion, gave rise to concerns that Abbey National, and its Spanish parent Banco Santander, were subject to considerable financial stress at that time.

During the 2010s, Porterbrook engaged in various efforts to overhaul and refurbish elements of its rolling stock, particularly multiple units. One proposal was the refurbishment of its British Rail Class 144 'Pacer' diesel multiple units, referred to as the Class 144e (Evolution), it would bring it up to the requirements of the Persons with reduced mobility-Technical Specifications for Interoperability accessibility regulations. It featured several upgrades such as the addition of new 2+2 style seating, a fully accessible toilet, two wheelchair spaces and spaces for bicycles and luggage, as well as Wi-Fi and media screens.

In December 2016, Arriva UK Trains subsidiary Northern and Porterbrook announced a plan to convert eight Class 319 electric multiple units to bi-mode units, to allow through working between electrified and non-electrified routes. These units, which were initially marketed as "Class 319 Flex", have been designated as Class 769 under TOPS, will use newly installed diesel engines and alternators fitted under each of the driving trailer vehicles, to power the traction motors through the train's existing DC bus.

During the 2010s, Porterbrook began disposing of their Class 43 power cars, used on Intercity 125 services; a number of power cars (along with a set of Mark 3 coaches) were acquired by Locomotive Services Limited, while the two locomotives involved in the record breaking test run were donated, one, 43102, to the national collection at Shildon, and the other, 43159, to the 125 Group.

During 2019, Freightliner purchased 13 Class 90 electric locomotives from Porterbrook that were formerly operated by Greater Anglia. Upon their transfer in May 2020, they underwent a modification programme to match the freight Class 90 specification. In February 2020, Porterbrook signed a 15-year lease with St Modwen to take over the Quinton Rail Technology Centre at Long Marston.

In 2020, it was announced that Porterbrook was funding a £55 million five-year Project Aurora programme to refurbish 214 Class 377 'Electrostar' EMUs operated by Southern Trains. Changes include the installation of screens showing live GTR and London Underground service information, the provision of USB and power points, energy-saving LED lighting and a passenger-counting system which will enable GTR to analyse how busy individual services are.

During July 2021, an agreement was announced for the British investment fund Dalmore Capital and an Israeli infrastructure fund, Generation Capital, to acquire the 30% shareholding in Porterbook previously held by The Infrastructure Fund, Utilities Trust of Australia and the NatWest pension fund.. As of late 2025, Israeli fund Generation Capital held 10% of Porterbrook. Dalmore Capital (acquired in May 2025 by Royal London) also had a holding through its Dalmore Capital fund 4 (also invested in other UK rail assets).

The 2024 accounts show revenue of just over £350 million in 2023 and 2024

In January 2026, it was announced that Porterbrook had agreed to acquire the Alstom Class 730 and CAF Class 196 fleets from Corelink for an undisclosed sum. The transaction covered 324 Class 730 electric multiple-unit vehicles and 80 Class 196 diesel multiple-unit cars operated by West Midlands Trains.

In November 2026, Porterbrook agreed to supply 56 new MWA box wagons to GB Railfreight. The wagons are being manufactured by WH Davis in Nottinghamshire and are intended to transport recycled material to 7Steel's Cardiff facility for steel production. The first wagon was scheduled for completion in September 2027.

== Porterbrook liveried locomotives ==
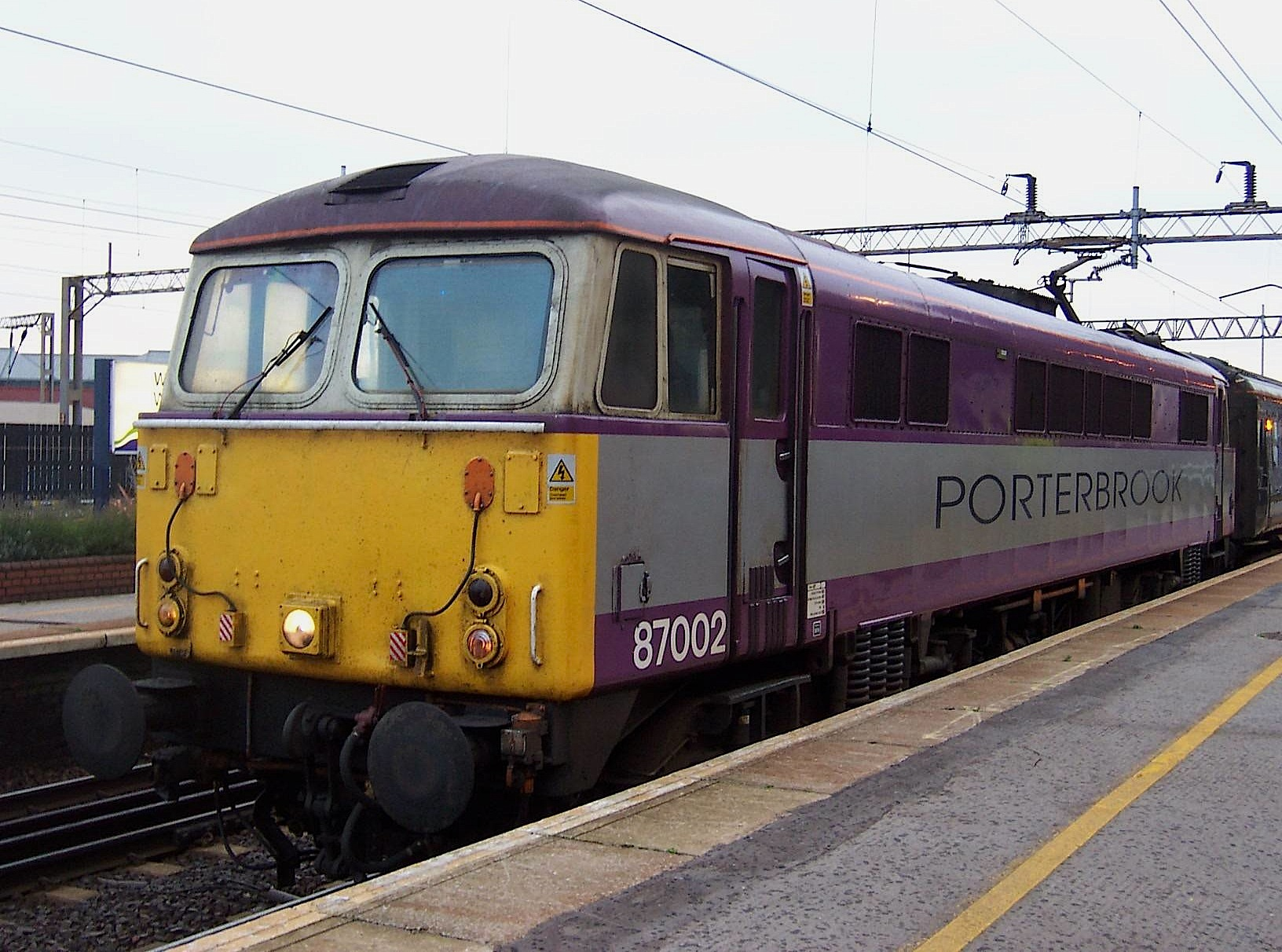
87002 in later Porterbrook livery

Porterbrook has painted some locomotives in its purple house colours. Deltic D9016 was repainted in 1999 after Porterbrook sponsored its return to service. Class 47s 47807 and 47817 operated for Virgin CrossCountry in the late 1990s in Porterbrook livery as did 57601 for First Great Western from 2001, and 87002 for Virgin Trains West Coast from 2003.

== Assets ==
The fleet Porterbrook inherited from British Rail in 1994 comprised:

Class	Total
43	81
47	32
73	14
87	35
90	15
141	38
143	36
144	46
150	128
153	40
156	76
158	211
159	66
205	30
207	10
319	344
323	117
411	424
412	28
422	92
423	188
455	364
456	48
Mark 3 coaches	649
Driving Van Trailer	52

As of December 2025, Porterbrook owned 71 locomotives (including 48 class 66) and 461 wagons, along with some class 769 multiple units. Porterbrook also owns the Long Marston testing facility since 2021
