= British Rail Classes 201, 202 and 203 =

Diesel-electric train series

British Rail Class 201 (6S), British Rail Class 202 (6L) and British Rail Class 203 (6B)
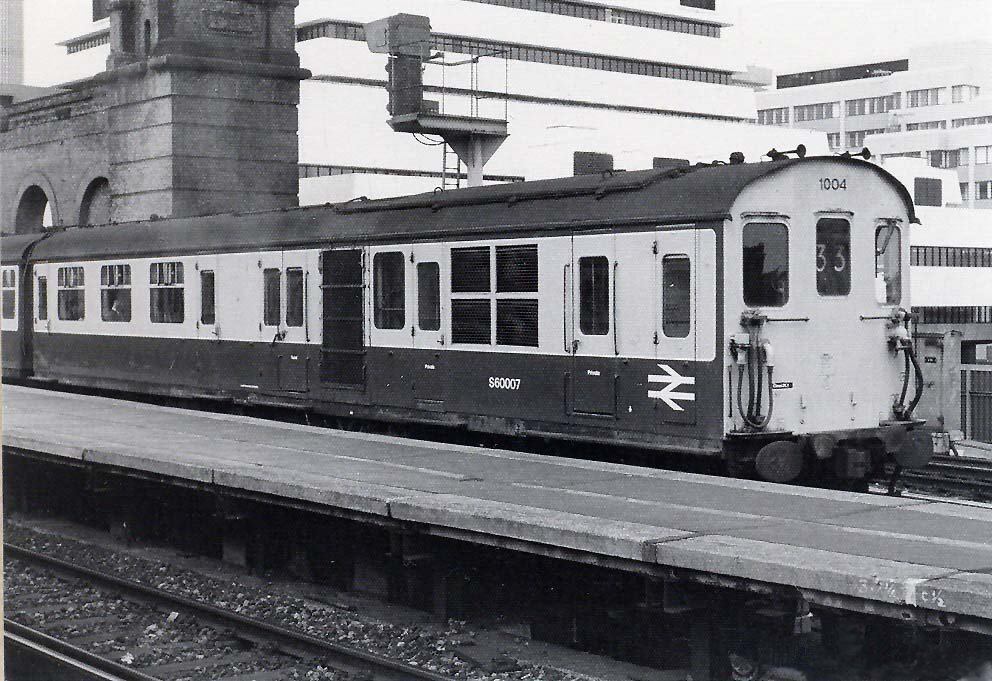
- Set 1004 prepares to leave Cannon Street station in 1984.
- Manufacturers: Eastleigh, Ashford Works and Lancing Carriage Works
- Constructed: 1956-58
- Entered service: 1957–1986
- Scrapped: 1986
- Number built: 138 vehicles (23 units)
- Number preserved: 15 vehicles (1 unit)
- Formation: DMBSO-TSOL-TSOL-TFK-TSOL-DMBSO (6S, 6L); DMBSO-TSOL-TBU-TFK-TSOL-DMBSO (6B)
- Operator: Southern Region of British Railways
- Depot: St. Leonards
- Line served: Hastings Line

Specifications
- Car body construction: Steel
- Train length: 358 feet 9 inches (109.35 m) (6S); 397 feet 9 inches (121.23 m) (6L, 6B)
- Car length: 56 ft 11 in (17.35 m) (6S); 63 ft 5 in (19.33 m) (6L, 6B) (length over headstocks)
- Width: 8 ft 0 in (2.44 m)
- Height: 12 ft 3 in (3.73 m)
- Doors: Hinged slam
- Maximum speed: 75 mph (121 km/h)
- Weight: 225 long tons (229 t; 252 short tons) per unit (6S); 231 long tons (235 t; 259 short tons) per unit (6L, 6B)
- Traction system: DEMU
- Prime mover: English Electric 4SRKT Mark II
- Power output: 500 hp (370 kW)
- Transmission: Electric
- Acceleration: 0.81 mph/s (1.30 km/h/s)
- Bogies: Commonwealth or B4
- Braking system: Air/EP
- Coupling system: Drop-head buck-eye
- Multiple working: with Classes 201 to 207
- Track gauge: 1,435 mm (4 ft 8 1/2 in) standard gauge

Class 201, Class 202 and Class 203 were the TOPS codes for a series of diesel-electric multiple units built for the Southern Region of British Railways in 1957–86. They were classified by the Southern Region as 6S, 6L and 6B respectively, and known collectively as the Hastings Diesels or Hastings Units. They were built for service on the Hastings Line, which had a restricted loading gauge due to deficiencies in the construction of the tunnels when the line was built between 1845 and 1852. The Hastings Units served from 1957 to 1988, being withdrawn when the Hastings Line was electrified with single-track sections through some of the tunnels.

== Background ==
The Hastings Line was built by the South Eastern Railway between 1845 and 1852 across the difficult terrain of the High Weald. The line connected Tunbridge (Note: The modern spelling of "Tonbridge" was not adopted as the official spelling until 1870.) and Hastings via Tunbridge Wells. Due to lax supervision of the contractors who built the tunnels, these were built poorly, with an insufficient number of rings of bricks lining the bore. The solution was to add additional rings of bricks inside the tunnels affected. This led to a restricted loading gauge in the tunnels. Consequently, rolling stock built to this loading gauge had to be used on the line. Between Tonbridge and Grove Junction, "Restriction 1" stock could be used. Between Grove Junction and Battle, "Restriction 0" stock had to be used. From Battle to Bopeep Junction, "Restriction 4" (Note: Restriction 4 was equivalent to the British Railways standard C1 loading gauge.) stock could be used.

From 1931, the Southern Railway (Note: The South Eastern Railway was absorbed into the Southern Railway on 1 January 1923.) Schools class steam locomotives were introduced to work the Hastings Line. Six Pullman carriages had been built in 1926 for use on the line. A further 104 carriages were built to Restriction 0 between 1929 and 1934. The first proposals to electrify the Hastings Line were put forward in 1937. Two electric locomotives built to Restriction 0 were ordered in that year. A third locomotive of the class was built at a later date than the first two. The April 1937 electrification proposal was deferred, with an alternative proposal being made in October of that year. The Second World War intervened before the scheme could be revived. In 1946, various electrification schemes were at the planning stage.

Post-war, the Southern Railway became part of the new British Railways on 1 January 1948, becoming the Southern Region of British Railways. Work planned by the Southern Railway on the various electrification schemes was not put into effect. The carriages built for the Hastings Line were refurbished at a cost of £100,000 in the early 1950s with the intent of giving them a further ten years' service. Approval for the construction of four new sets of eight carriages was given at this time. These vehicles were to be built to the same length as existing stock in use on the Hastings Line, 56 feet 11 inches (17.35 m). The underframes were to be built at Ashford Works. In 1955, the electrification of railway lines in the south east was decided upon. Lines from the London termini to Dover and Folkestone were given priority. It was decided not to electrify the line between Tonbridge and Hastings. The operating department objected to single line sections in tunnels which would have been needed to operate rolling stock built to the standard loading gauge. Further objections were on the grounds of cost and that the necessary works would disrupt traffic on the line for a year.

Due to its extensive experience with electric traction, the Southern Region favoured diesel electric trains. Although these came with a higher initial cost, it was thought that they would be more economic to operate and maintain. Twenty-three six-coach units were to be built. They took set numbers 1001-07 (6S), 1011-19 (6L) and 1031-37 (6B), formerly used by two-car trailer sets used with the pre-war 3SUB electric multiple units. Taylor Woodrow built a new depot at St Leonards-on-Sea, East Sussex, where the Hastings Units were to be serviced and maintained.

== Technical description ==
All units were powered by two English Electric 4SRKT Mark II diesel engines. These were a development of the 4SRKT diesel engines fitted to diesel multiple units supplied by English Electric to Egyptian State Railways in 1947. The 4SRKT designation stood for 4-cylinder Supercharged Redesigned K-Type for Traction use. Cylinders were 10 inches (254 mm) bore by 12 inches (305 mm) stroke. A Napier MS100 turbocharger was fitted to each engine. An English Electric Type 824/1B generator was driven by the diesel engine. It had a continuous rating of 330 kilowatts (440 hp), 600A at 550V. This supplied power to the traction motors. English Electric 507 or 511s being used. They were freely interchangeable with those in use on Southern Region electric multiple units.

=== Class 201 (6S) ===
The first seven units cost £85,000 each. They were built on the 56 feet 11 inches (17.35 m) underframes built at Ashford Works and originally intended to be used for locomotive-hauled carriages. The units were designated 6S (six-car, short underframes). The bodies were built at Eastleigh Works and fitted out at Lancing Carriage Works. The 6S units were 358 feet 9 inches (109.35 m) long overall.

Each unit was formed by two motor coaches, three second class carriages and a first class carriage. Total seating capacity was 242. All vehicles were of steel construction. There was a corridor connection between the carriages of each unit, but not between units. Buckeye couplers were fitted.

Key:	Preserved	Departmental Use	Scrapped

Original 6S Units

Unit No.		DMBSO	TSOL	TSOL	TFK	TSOL	DMBSO	Withdrawn	Status
New	Old	DMBSO	TSOL	TSOL	TFK	TSOL	DMBSO	Withdrawn	Status
201001	1001	60000	60500	60501	60700	60502	60001	5/1986	Preserved
-	1002	60002	60503	60504	60701	60505	60003	5/1986	Sandite unit 1066
-	1003	60004	60506	60507‡	60702	60508‡	60005	11/1964	Disbanded, vehicles later scrapped
-	1004	60006	60509†	60510	60703	60511	60007	4/1986	Scrapped
-	1005	60008	60512	60513	60704	60514	60009	4/1986	Scrapped
-	1006	60010	60515	60516	60705	60517	60011	4/1986	Scrapped
-	1007	60012	60518	60519	60706‡	60520‡	60013	4/1986	Scrapped

Departmental Units

Unit No.		DM	T	DM	Withdrawn	Status
New	Old	DM	T	DM	Withdrawn	Status
1066	1002	977376 (ex-60002)	977379 (ex-60504)	977377 (ex-60003)	1994	Scrapped (1994)

Notes

† 60509 withdrawn March 1983 due to excessive body corrosion.
‡ 60507-8/20/706 were in unit 1007 at the time of the Hither Green rail crash, and were withdrawn in November 1967 as a result of damage sustained.

=== Class 202 (6L) ===
The first three 6L units cost £85,000 each. The remainder cost £90,680 each. Formation was identical to the 6S units, but the total seating capacity was 288. These units were built with vehicles that had 63 feet 5 inches (19.33 m) long underframes. Total unit length was 397 feet 9 inches (121.23 m).

Key:	Preserved	Reformed	Departmental Use	Scrapped

Original 6L Units

Unit No.		DMBSO	TSOL	TSOL	TFK	TSOL	DMBSO	Withdrawn	Status
New	Old	DMBSO	TSOL	TSOL	TFK	TSOL	DMBSO	Withdrawn	Status
-	1011	60014	60521	60522	60707	60523	60015	1986	Reformed to 203001
-	1012	60016	60524	60525	60708	60526	60017	1986	Preserved
202001	1013	60018	60527	60528	60709	60529	60019	1987	Reformed as 203101
-	1014	60020	60530	60531	60710	60532	60021	?	Scrapped
-	1015	60022	60533	60534	60711	60535	60023	?	Scrapped
-	1016	60024	60536	60537	60712	60538	60025	?	Scrapped
-	1017	60026	60539	60540	60713	60541	60027	?	Scrapped
-	1018	60028	60542	60543	60714	60544	60029	?	Scrapped
-	1019	60030	60545	60546	60715	60547	60031	?	Scrapped

Reformed 4L Units

Unit No.		DMBSO	TSOL	TSOL	DMBSO	Withdrawn	Status
New	Old	DMBSO	TSOL	TSOL	DMBSO	Withdrawn	Status
203001	1011	60152 (ex-60014)	60522	60523	60153 (ex-60015)	1990	Sandite unit 1067
203101	202001	60018	60528	60709	60019	1988	Preserved

Departmental Units

Unit No.		DM	T	DM (DT*)	Withdrawn	Status
New	Old	DM	T	DM (DT*)	Withdrawn	Status
1067	203001	977698 (ex-60152)	977697 (ex-60523)	977699 (ex-60153)	1996	Scrapped (1996)
1068	207014/203001	977700 (ex-60139)	977696 (ex-60522)	977701* (ex-60910)	1992	Scrapped (2005)

=== Class 203 (6B) ===
The 6B units cost £90,860 each. Formation was similar to the 6S and 6L units, except that an unclassified buffet car replaced one of the second class carriages. They were built on the same longer underframes used for the 6L units. Total seating capacity was 249.

Key:	Preserved	Reformed	Departmental Use	Scrapped

Original 6B Units

Unit No.		DMBSO	TSOL	TFK	TBU	TSOL	DMBSO	Withdrawn	Status
New	Old	DMBSO	TSOL	TFK	TBU	TSOL	DMBSO	Withdrawn	Status
-	1031	60033	60548	60716	60755	60549	60032	-	Scrapped
-	1032	60034	60551	60717	60750	60552	60035	-	Scrapped
-	1033	60036†	60554	60718	60751	60555	60037	Disbanded Oct 1980.	Scrapped
-	1034	60039	60557	60719	60752	60533	60038	-	Scrapped
-	1035	60040	60556	60720	60559	60553	60041	-	Scrapped
-	1036	60043	60559	60721	60756	60558	60042	-	Scrapped
-	1037	60044	60561	60722	60753	60560	60045	Disbanded Nov 1985.	Scrapped

Notes

†60036 withdrawn March 1980 due to damage sustained in a derailment at Appledore.

== Service ==
The 6S units were delivered in January 1957, outshopped in the standard green livery, including the ends of the motor coaches. A series of trial running began, based at Eastleigh. The first trial run took place on 17 January 1957. Unit 1001 running from Eastleigh to Fareham. The next day, it ran a circular trip Eastleigh – Andover Town – Basingstoke – Woking – Alton – Eastleigh. On 25 February, unit 1003 made a demonstration trip from Waterloo to Bournemouth West, where it was declared a failure due to an overheated bearing on one of the traction motors. It was returned to Eastleigh for repairs.

The intention was that the Hastings Units would be introduced to traffic during June 1957. However, on 5 April 1957 a fire destroyed the signal box at Cannon Street station in London, severely curtailing services operating in to and out of the station. Following the commissioning of a temporary signal box on 5 May the 6S units entered service the next day, working the 06:58 and 07:26 Hastings – Cannon Street, and the 17:18 and 18:03 Cannon Street to Hastings Services. The first three 6L units, 1011–13, were delivered in May 1957. From 17 June, the Hastings Units were in daily service.

The rest of the 6L units (1014–19) were built in late 1957 and early 1958. The Hastings Units operated almost all passenger trains on the Hastings Line from April 1958. The 6B units (1031–37) were then constructed, with unit 1031 making a test run to Weymouth on 14 May 1958. All were in service by August of that year. From 1962, small yellow warning panels were painted on the ends of the motor coaches. Unit 1018 bring the first so painted.

In 1964, the buffet carriages were removed from units 1031–32. They were replaced by TSOs from unit 1007, which was reduced to four cars and used on Ashford – Hastings services. The two withdrawn buffet cars were stored at Micheldever, Hampshire. Units 1002-04 were disbanded in 1964. This was to allow steam locomotives to be withdrawn from the Tonbridge – Redhill – Reading route. Six new three-car diesel-electric multiple units were formed by using the motor carriage and a second class carriage from the disbanded Hastings Unit and a driving trailer from a 2EPB unit. The first eleven of which had been built to take Buckeye couplers. The engines were uprated to 600 horsepower (450 kW). The new units thus formed were designated 3R (3-car, Reading Line). Due to the difference in body widths between the Hastings Line and EPB stock the quickly gained the nickname "Tadpoles". This name appearing in official documents. The 3R units entered service on 4 January 1965. 6S unit 1007 was lengthened to six carriages at this time.

From mid-1966, the Hastings Units were repainted in an all-over blue livery as they went through the works for repairs. The motor coaches gained full yellow ends from early 1967. A few units, such as 1037, gained full yellow ends whilst still in green livery. Blue and grey livery was introduced in 1967.

In May 1979, two of the 3R units were disbanded, allowing unit 1002 to be reformed, albeit with only five carriages. It regained the sixth in October following the disbandment of two more 3Rs and their replacement on the Tonbridge – Reading service by Class 119 diesel multiple units. The remaining two 3R units were used on Ashford – Hastings services.

Buffet facilities were withdrawn from the 6Bs in May 1980. The buffet car on the 18:45 Charing Cross – Hastings train was specially manned. Such facilities not normally being available on a Sunday. The buffet cars were withdrawn between October 1980 and January 1981 and stored at Basingstoke. They were subsequently scrapped by Mayer Newman at Snailwell, Suffolk. The 6B units were then designated 5L.

On 28 October 1983, it was announced that the line was to be electrified and the Hastings Units would thus be withdrawn from service. The Hastings Units were showing their age, and apart from the first ten sets built, had blue asbestos, which British Rail was committed to eliminating from its trains by the end of 1987. Electrification of the Hastings Line was to cost £23,925,000. Track through four of the tunnels was to be singled. The Hastings Units ran in public service for the last time on 11 May 1986, although unit 1011 ran as a four-car unit until October 1986. Three motor coaches and two carriages remained in service past May 1986 in 3D and 3H units.

=== Accidents and incidents ===
- On 23 December 1958, unit 1017 collided with unit 1035 at Tunbridge Wells Central. Eighteen people were injured, with three of them admitted to hospital.
- On 28 January 1960, units 1014 and 1035 were in collision with an electric multiple unit train at Borough Market Junction, London after the latter passed a signal at danger. A third electric multiple unit train then collided with the derailed carriages. Seven people were injured. The leading two vehicles of unit 1014 were damaged.
- On 20 March 1961, units 1018 and 1007 formed train that was in collision with an electric multiple unit train at Cannon Street after the latter passed a signal at danger. Eleven people were injured. Repairs to unit 1018 took six months.
- On 2 March 1966, units 1007 and 1015 collided at Grove Park, London.

- On 5 November 1967, units 1007 and 1017 were derailed near Hither Green when running at 70 miles per hour (110 km/h) Forty-nine people were killed. Seventy-eight were injured, including 27 seriously. The cause was poor maintenance of the track; defective ballast formation had caused a 30 feet (9.1 m) length of rail to fracture, derailing the third carriage of unit 1007. The carriages from unit 1007 were all withdrawn, the motor coaches were repaired. Unit 1017 was returned to service in December 1967, initially as a five-car unit. Unit 1007 was reformed in May 1968 and unit 1017 returned to six coaches in July 1968.
- On 10 June 1970, unit 1034 was derailed at Godstone. Following the accident, the unit was temporarily disbanded with its buffet carriage entering service in unit 1031. Unit 1034 was reformed in January 1971.
- On 11 January 1979, unit 1032 collided with the buffer stop at Charing Cross when arriving on an empty stock working from Cannon Street.
- On 14 March 1980, an empty stock train comprising five Hastings Unit vehicles derailed at Appledore due to excessive speed through a set of points. The driver was killed. A motor coach was consequently withdrawn from service due to extensive damage.

=== Vehicles in departmental service ===
TDB 975025

Buffet car 60755, which had been withdrawn from 6B 1031, was rebuilt to an inspection saloon at Stewarts Lane in 1969–70. Numbered DB975025 (later TDB975025), it is notable for conveying the Prince and Princess of Wales from Waterloo to Romsey following their wedding on 29 July 1981. It also conveyed Pope John Paul II from Gatwick Airport to London Victoria station on 28 May 1982. On 12 December 2008, the Railway Heritage Committee designated the vehicle for preservation.

RDB 975386

Buffet car 60750, which had been withdrawn from 6B 1032, was converted into a test coach. Numbered RDB975386, "Laboratory 4" and subsequently named Hastings, it was used to develop the tilting suspension system used on the Advanced Passenger Train (APT). The vehicle was subsequently converted back to conventional suspension and saw use in tests that led to the introduction of the Class 91 locomotives. In 1980–81, RDB975386 was used in a special train testing a pantograph for use on the APT. During the tests, the vehicle ran at 125 miles per hour (201 km/h). The carriage was withdrawn from service in 1990.

== Preserved vehicles ==
=== 60000 ===
Motor carriage 60000 was built in 1956 as part of unit 1001. It was preserved by Hastings Diesels Ltd in 1989 and restored to main-line use in April 1996.

=== 60001 ===
Motor carriage 60001 was built in 1956 as part of unit 1001. It was purchased by Hastings Diesels Ltd but has not been restored.

=== 60016 ===
Motor carriage 60016 was built in 1956 as part of unit 1012. It was purchased in 1990 by Hastings Diesels Ltd. Restored by December 2001, it carries the name Mountfield.

=== 60018 ===
Motor carriage 60018 was built in 1957 as part of unit 1013. Purchased by Hastings Diesels Ltd in 1990, it was restored to main-line use in April 1996. It carries the name Tunbridge Wells.

=== 60019 ===
Motor carriage 60019 was built in 1957 as part of unit 1013. Purchased by Hastings Diesels Ltd in 1990, it has been restored and mainline certified.

=== 60500 ===
Trailer second 60500 was built in 1956 as part of unit 1001. Purchased by Hastings Diesels Ltd in 1990, it has not been restored.

=== 60501 ===
Trailer second 60501 was built in 1956 as part of unit 1001. Purchased by Hastings Diesels Ltd in 1989, it has been restored to main-line use.

=== 60502 ===
Trailer second 60502 was built in 1956 as part of unit 1001. Purchased by Hastings Diesels Ltd in 1989, it has been restored to mainline use.

=== 60527 ===
Trailer second 60527 was built in 1957 as part of unit 1013. Purchased by Hastings Diesels Ltd in 1989, it has not been restored.

=== 60528 ===
Trailer second 60528 was built in 1957 as part of unit 1013. Purchased by Hastings Diesels Ltd in 1989, it has been restored to mainline use.

=== 60529 ===
Trailer second 60528 was built in 1957 as part of unit 1013. Purchased by Hastings Diesels Ltd in 1989, it has been restored to main-line use.

=== 60700 ===
Trailer first 60700 was built in 1956 as part of unit 1001. Purchased by Hastings Diesels Ltd in 1989, it has not been restored.

=== 60708 ===
Trailer first 60708 was built in 1957 as part of unit 1012. purchased in 1990 by Hastings Diesels Ltd, it is undergoing restoration.

=== 60709 ===
Trailer first 60709 was built in 1957 as part of unit 1013. Purchased in 1989 by Hastings Diesels Ltd, it has not been restored.

=== 60750 ===
Trailer buffet 60750 was built in 1958 s part of unit 1033. Later converted to research vehicle "Laboratory 4" Hastings, was initially purchased by Hastings Diesels Ltd in 1990 but was found that it was not suitable for return to main-line use. It was at the Electric Railway Museum, Coventry by September 2011, where it is being restored in original research division livery as Laboratory 4.

== See also ==
- British Rail Class 201
- British Rail Class 202
- British Rail Class 203
