= British Rail Class 419 =

Class of British electric multiple unit

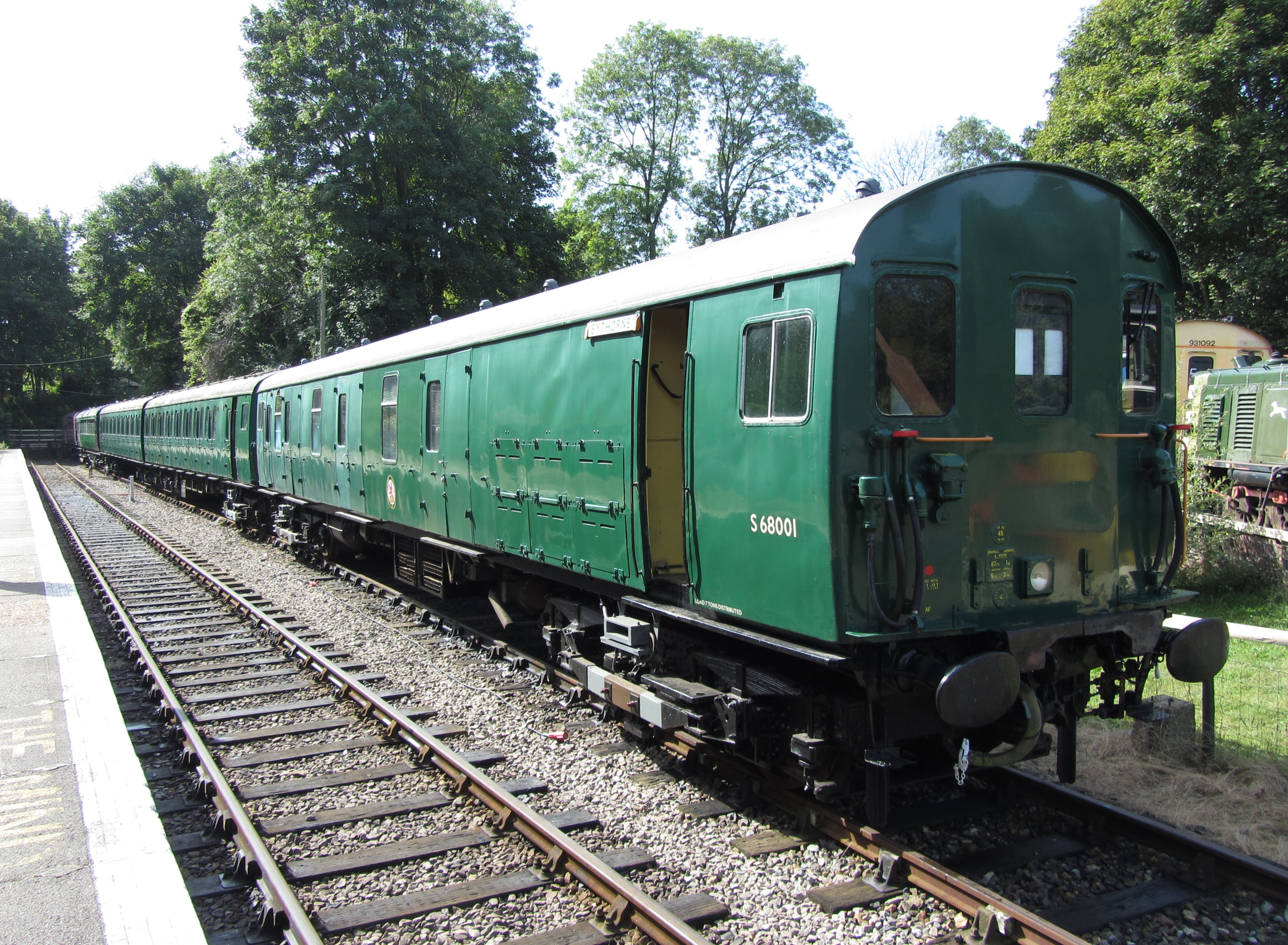
- 9001 at Shepherdswell, East Kent Railway
- In service: 1959 - 2004
- Manufacturer: BR Eastleigh
- Order nos.: 30458 (68001-2); 30623 (68003-10)
- Constructed: 1959 (68001-2); 1960-61 (68003-10)
- Entered service: 1959
- Number built: 10
- Formation: Single car
- Diagram: EX560
- Fleet numbers: 68001-68010 (car nos.); 419001-419010 (TOPS unit nos.)
- Operator: British Rail
- Depot: Ramsgate

Specifications
- Car length: 19.64 m (64 ft 5 in)
- Width: 9 ft 3 in (2.82 m)
- Height: 12 ft 9 1/2 in (3.899 m)
- Maximum speed: 90 mph (140 km/h)
- Weight: 45.5 long tons (46.2 t; 51.0 short tons)
- Traction motors: 2 × 250 hp (190 kW) English Electric 507 total 500 hp (370 kW)
- Current collection: Third rail
- Bogies: Mk 3B
- Braking systems: Air (EP/Auto), also fitted with vacuum exhauster for hauling vacuum brake fitted van stock
- Coupling system: Buckeye
- Multiple working: Within Southern Region units and vacuum stock
- Track gauge: 1,435 mm (4 ft 8 1/2 in) standard gauge

The British Rail Class 419 Motor Luggage Vans (or MLV) were battery electric multiple unit cars built from 1959-61 by BR at Eastleigh Works.

== Description ==
Each MLV unit is essentially a motorised BG carriage, with a driver's position at each end. Each vehicle has two luggage compartments and a guard's compartment.

Ten of these units were built for the boat trains from London Victoria to Dover and Folkestone. Units were originally numbered in the range 68001-68010, but were classified Class 419 under the TOPS system and were then renumbered 419001-419010, the numbers actually carried on the units in service reduced to 9001-9010, omitting the first two digits.

The units were able to work alone, hauling a limited load, (Note: The vehicles were able to haul up to two trailer vans, if necessary.) or work in multiple with other EP-type rolling stock, usually in conjunction with Class 410 and Class 411. The units were also fitted with batteries to allow them to operate over the short-distance of non-electrified quayside lines at Dover and Folkestone. The batteries allowed the units to be used at low-speed for 20–30 minutes, and could be recharged when the unit was taking power from 750 V DC third-rail.

By 1963, it was discovered that one luggage carriage was insufficient for the boat train service. Some trains were operated with paired MLVs, which resulted in a shortage of the vehicles. To overcome the problem, six Trailer Luggage Vans (TLV) were introduced in 1968 and kept in use alongside the MLVs until 1975. These were numbered 68201-68206 as Class 499 and were conventional BG carriages, except for having their gangway ends sealed from use.

The MLVs were withdrawn from traffic in 1991-92, with the closure of Dover Western Docks railway station and the end of the boat train services.

== Prototype ==
The design of the units was based on an earlier vehicle, numbered 68000, which was used as a parcels van on the Tyneside DC electrified network. When the South Tyneside network was de-electrified in 1967, the unit was initially transferred for use on the Southport to Liverpool electric line before being withdrawn.

== Departmental service ==
After withdrawal from normal service, the entire fleet was transferred to departmental service as Class 931 tractor units. Unit 9006 was damaged in an accident at Ramsgate in 1994, resulting in it being withdrawn and subsequently scrapped. Units 9003 and 9009 were specially repainted in BR Blue and LSE "Jaffa Cake" liveries, by staff at Strawberry Hill depot, to commemorate the closure of the depot in 1995.

Most of the units were withdrawn again in 1997. They were kept at Bournemouth depot, while they were waiting for disposal. While there, units 9001 and 9002 stayed in use as depot shunters. Unit 9001 was retired in 1998, and subsequently preserved. Unit 9002 was kept by South West Trains until 2004, when former 4CEP unit 1512 replaced it.

== Preservation ==
All but two of the units have been preserved. One unit was scrapped after an accident whilst in service, and the other was scrapped in preservation.

The first unit to be preserved was first-built no. 9001, which was saved in 1998 after a campaign by the EPB Preservation Group. It was bought to power the group's preserved 2EPB unit, no. 5759. The units dumped at Bournemouth were put out to tender in 1999, and were bought mainly for use as storage vehicles. Their ability to move under battery-power has also allowed limited passenger use. The final unit to be saved was no. 9002, which has now been stored at Southall. After extensive overhaul at Southall 9002 ventured back onto the main line on 28 August 2015 when it was hauled by Battle Of Britain Class 34067 Tangmere to Ramsgate Depot for an open day, it returned a day later but has not been out since. The table below gives details of the current (as of 2016) locations and fates of the Class 419 units.

== Fleet details ==
Key:	Preserved	Scrapped

Unit Number		Final Livery	DMLV	Introduced	Withdrawn	Status
Original	Departmental	Final Livery	DMLV	Introduced	Withdrawn	Status
9001	931091	BR Green	68001	April 1959	1998	Stored at Southall
9002	931092	NSE	68002	May 1959	2004	Stored at Southall
9003	931093	BR Green	68003	December 1960	1997	Preserved at the Eden Valley Railway
9004	931094	BR Green	68004	December 1960	1997	Preserved at the Mid-Norfolk Railway
9005	931095	LSE "Jaffa Cake"	68005	January 1961	1997	Preserved at the Eden Valley Railway
9006	-	-	68006	January 1961	December 1991	Scrapped March 1994 following a collision.
9007	931097	-	68007	February 1961	1997	Scrapped 2006 for spares.
9008	931098	BR Green	68008	March 1961	1997	Stored at Southall
9009	931099	BR Green	68009	March 1961	1997	Stored at Southall
9010	931090	In house colours	68010	March 1961	1997	Preserved at the Eden Valley Railway

== Models ==
A OO gauge model of the Class 419 MLV has been produced by Bachmann Branchline.
