= British Rail Class 202 =

Class of diesel-electric multiple units

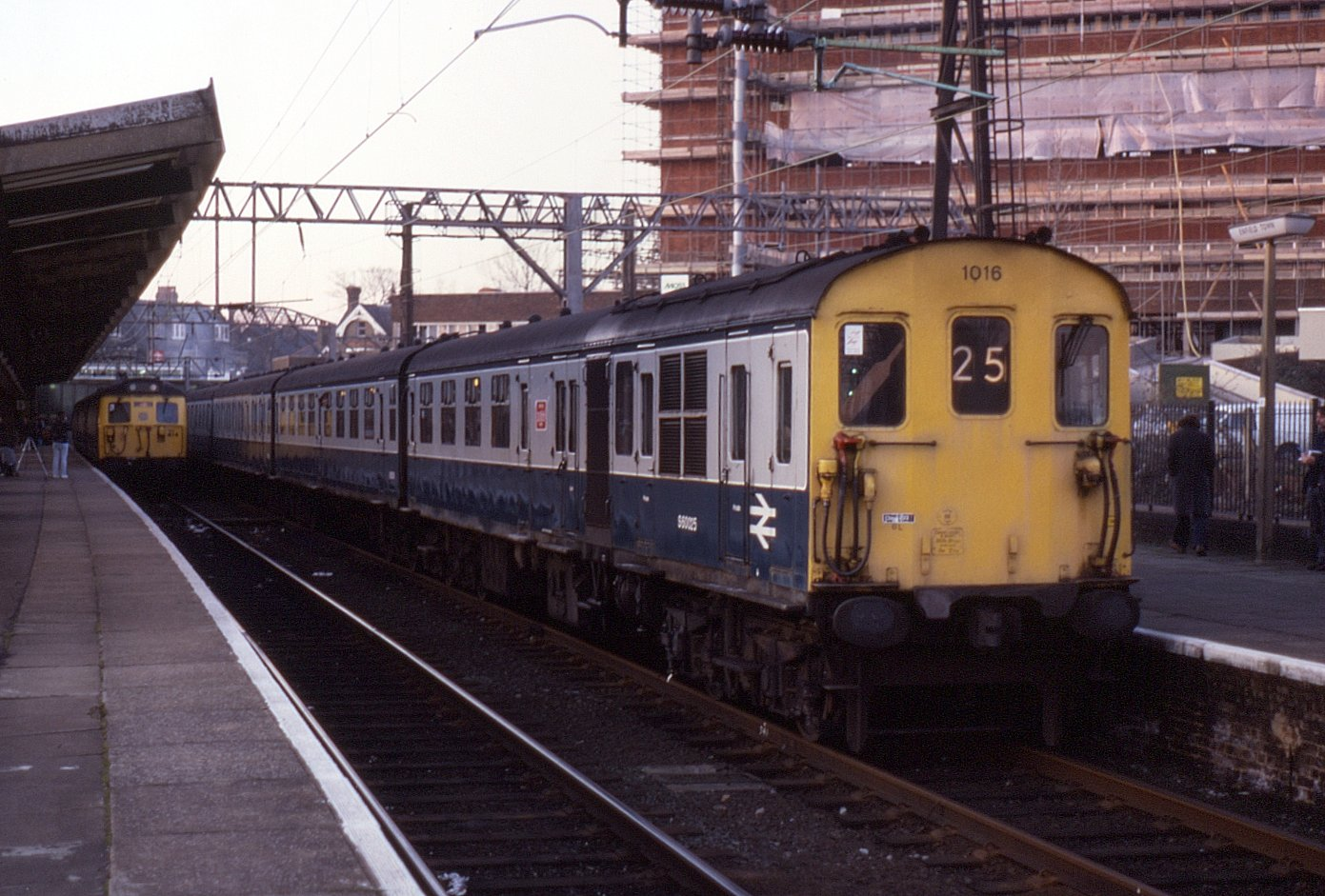
- 1016 at Enfield Town on a farewell railtour in 1986.
- In service: 1957–1987
- Manufacturers: Eastleigh and Ashford Works
- Constructed: 1957–1958
- Number built: 54 vehicles (9 units)
- Formation: DMBSO-TSOL-TSOL-TFK-TSOL-DMBSO
- Operator: British Rail

Specifications
- Car length: 64 ft 6 in (19.66 m)
- Width: 9 ft 0 in (2.74 m)
- Height: 12 ft 3 in (3.73 m)
- Maximum speed: 75 mph (121 km/h)
- Weight: 55 long tons (55.9 t; 61.6 short tons) (power car)
- Prime mover: English Electric 4SRKT Mark II
- Power output: 500 hp (370 kW)
- Transmission: Diesel-electric
- HVAC: Electric
- Track gauge: 4 ft 8 1/2 in (1,435 mm)

The British Rail Class 202 (or 6L) diesel-electric multiple units were built from 1957-58 at Eastleigh and Ashford Works. These units were built to work the London Charing Cross to Hastings services. Several tunnels along the route had restricted clearance, meaning that these units were built with a narrow body profile. Similar to the Class 201 (or 6S) they were built to the longer (63ft 5in) British Rail Mark 1 standard and therefore had 288 seats (240 second class plus 48 first class) compared to the 242 (200+42) of the 6S units.

The last six-car units were withdrawn in 1986, when the Hastings line was electrified. The line through the tunnels was reduced to single track, allowing standard loading gauge 4CEP, 4CIG, and 4VEP electrical multiple units to replace the diesel units on passenger services. One unit was subsequently reinstated to provide emergency cover, and was renumbered as 202001 to conform with the TOPS numbering system.

After the mass withdrawals of 1986, several units were reformed as four-car units, and subsequently renumbered into the Class 203 series. In addition, several vehicles saw further use as departmental vehicles.

== Fleet details ==
Key:	Preserved	Reformed	Departmental Use	Scrapped

Original 6L Units

Unit No.		DMBSO	TSOL	TSOL	TFK	TSOL	DMBSO	Withdrawn	Status
New	Old	DMBSO	TSOL	TSOL	TFK	TSOL	DMBSO	Withdrawn	Status
-	1011	60014	60521	60522	60707	60523	60015	1987	Reformed to 203001
-	1012	60016	60524	60525	60708	60526	60017	1986	Preserved
202001	1013	60018	60527	60528	60709	60529	60019	1987	Reformed as 203101
-	1014	60020	60530	60531	60710	60532	60021	?	Scrapped
-	1015	60022	60533	60534	60711	60535	60023	?	Scrapped
-	1016	60024	60536	60537	60712	60538	60025	?	Scrapped
-	1017	60026	60539	60540	60713	60541	60027	?	Scrapped
-	1018	60028	60542	60543	60714	60544	60029	?	Scrapped
-	1019	60030	60545	60546	60715	60547	60031	?	Scrapped

Reformed 4L Units

Unit No.		DMBSO	TSOL	TSOL	DMBSO	Withdrawn	Status
New	Old	DMBSO	TSOL	TSOL	DMBSO	Withdrawn	Status
203001	1011	60152 (ex-60014)	60522	60523	60153 (ex-60015)	1990	Sandite unit 1067
203101	202001	60018	60528	60709	60019	1988	Preserved

Departmental Units

Unit No.		DM	T	DM (DT*)	Withdrawn	Status
New	Old	DM	T	DM (DT*)	Withdrawn	Status
1067	203001	977698 (ex-60152)	977697 (ex-60523)	977699 (ex-60153)	1996	Scrapped (1996)
1068	207014/203001	977700 (ex-60139)	977696 (ex-60522)	977701* (ex-60910)	1992	Scrapped (2005)

== Preservation ==
One complete unit has been preserved.

- 1013 – by Hastings Diesels

Two vehicles from unit 1012 have also been preserved.

- 1012 – DMBSO 60016 and TFK 60708 - by Hastings Diesels

Several of the vehicles from 1012 and 1013 now operate in preserved mainline registered unit 201001. To avoid conflict with Class 60 locomotives, motor vehicles 60016 and 60018 have been renumbered to 60116 and 60118 respectively. These two vehicles have also been named after towns along the routes which they previously worked.

- 60116 (ex-60016) – Mountfield
- 60118 (ex-60018) – Tunbridge Wells

== See also ==
- British Rail Classes 201, 202 and 203
