= Southern Railway multiple unit numbering and classification =

Classification and number system used by the Southern Railway of British Rail

The Southern Railway created classification and numbering systems for its large fleet of electric multiple units, perpetuated by the Southern Region of British Rail until the early 1980s, when the impact of TOPS was felt. Some stock is still allocated Southern-style classifications in a semi-official manner.

== Classification ==
The early AC electric multiple units (EMUs) were referred to by a two-letter code. This was adapted for the DC third-rail system that was adopted by the Southern Railway, with units being given a three-letter code (sometimes two letters) prefixed by the number of cars in each unit, e.g. 4SUB for a four-car suburban unit.

The Southern Region perpetuated this and the same principles were adopted for diesel-electric multiple units but with single-letter codes. The last type to be officially allocated a designation in this series was the PEP stock of the early 1970s. Some types built since have been given semi-official designations in this style. (Note: This is different from the system used by British Rail, adopted from the LNER, to indicate the type of non-powered coach; see British Rail coach type codes.)

=== AC EMUs ===
SR designation	Meaning
CP	Crystal Palace
CW	Coulsdon & Wallington
SL	South London

=== DC EMUs ===
SR designation	BR class	Meaning
GLV	489	Gatwick Luggage Van
MLV	419	Motor Luggage Van
TLV	499	Trailer Luggage Van
2BIL	401	Bi-Lavatory
2EPB	416	Electro-Pneumatic Brake
2HAL	402	Half Lavatory
2HAP	414	Half lavatory with electro-Pneumatic Brake
2HIL	-	Unit 2611: 2HAL DMBT #10729 paired with 2BIL DTCL #12146
2NOL	-	No Lavatory
2PAN	402	Parcels and Newspapers
2PEP	446	Prototype Electro-Pneumatic Brake
2SAP	418	Second-Class Only Hap
2SL	-	South London
2WIM	-	Wimbledon
3COP	421	Coastway Open Plan
3SUB	-	Suburban
3TC	492	Trailer Control
3TIS	486	Vectis (Isle of Wight)
4BEP	412	Buffet Electro-Pneumatic Brake
4BIG	422	Buffet Brighton
4BUF	404	Buffet
4CAP	413	Coastway Hap
4CEP	411	Corridor Electro-Pneumatic Brake
4CIG	421	Corridor Brighton
4COR	404	Corridor
4DES	450	Desiro
4DD	-	Double Deck
4EPB	415	Electro-Pneumatic Brake
4GRI	404	Griddle Car
4HIT	455	HIgh density, Tightlock coupling. Proposed for the class, but not used.
4JOP	458/0	Juniper Outersuburban Porterbrook.
4LAV	-	Lavatory
4PEP	445	Prototype Electro-Pneumatic Brake
4PER	508	
4REP	432	Restaurant Electro-Pneumatic Brake
4RES	404	Restaurant
4SUB	405	Suburban
4TC	438	Trailer Control
4TEP	412	Temporary BEP
4VEC	485	Vectis (Isle of Wight)
4VEG	427	VEP Gatwick Express
4VEP	423	Vestibule Electro-Pneumatic Brake
4VIP	423	VEP Intermediate Plan
4VOP	423	VEP Open-Plan
5BEL	403	Brighton Belle
5DES	444	Desiro
5JUP	458/5	Juniper
5TCB	438	TC and Buffet
5WES	442	Wessex
6CIT	-	City Limited
6PAN	-	Pantry
6PUL	-	Pullman
6REP	431	Reformed REP
6TC	-	Trailer Control
6JAV	395	JAVelin. Unofficial classification, also referred to as 6HIT (Hitachi Rail).
7TC	-	Trailer Control
8DIG	422	Dedicated Brighton
8GAT	460	Gatwick Express
8MIG	421	Miniature Buffet and CIG
8VAB	480	Vestibule Autobrake Buffet

=== Diesel-electric multiple units ===
SR designation	BR class	Meaning
3D	207	Oxted
3H	205	Hampshire
3R	206	Reading
3T	204	Hampshire and added Trailer
6B	203	Hastings Buffet
6L	202	Hastings Long underframe
6S	201	Hastings Short underframe

== Unit numbering ==
Unit numbers were allocated from 1001, following the 1–1000 set numbers of semi-fixed formations of hauled coaching stock. Different types of unit were given numbers:

1001–1200	Unpowered trailer units for working with 3SUB stock (this series was later expanded to include 989–1000)
1201–1800	3SUB (ex-LSWR units with 1200 added to their original numbers)
1801–1999	Two-car inner-suburban (e.g. 2NOL)
2001–2899	Two-car outer-suburban (e.g. 2BIL)
2901–2999	Four-car outer-suburban (4LAV)
3001–3999	Four, five and six-car express (e.g. 4COR, 5BEL and 6PUL) (Note: The Brighton line express units were originally numbered between 2001 and 2053, but were renumbered between 3001 and 3053 in January 1937)
4001–4999	Four-car inner-suburban (4SUB and 4DD)
5001–5599	British Railways four-car inner-suburban (4EPB)
5601–6999	British Railways two-car (e.g. 2HAP)
7001–7999	British Railways four-car outer-suburban (e.g. 4CIG)
8001	Temporary eight-car (8VAB)
S1–S101	Departmental (non-revenue earning)

This series was perpetuated by the Southern Region with modifications, as older set numbers were reused for the following different types:

001–099	Parcels and departmental (Sxxx units renumbered)
301–999	Trailer control (first digit indicated number of cars, e.g. 301 = 3TC)
1001–1499	Diesel-electric multiple units (e.g. 6S)

2PEP reused number 2001, 4REP from 3001 and 4PEP 4001/4002. This series was abandoned in 1983, when units were renumbered to fit in with the TOPS classification system, which had nominally been in use for a decade. Even then, many units displayed only the last four digits, dropping the first two digits – e.g. unit 412 301 would have the number 2301 applied. Only with later units and 2xx series DEMUs were the full numbers shown, e.g. Classes 456, 458/5, 465 and 466, and some Class 455 sets, carry full six-digit numbers.

== See also ==
- List of British Rail classes
- British Rail brand names.
