= British Rail Class 203 =

Class of diesel-electric multiple unit

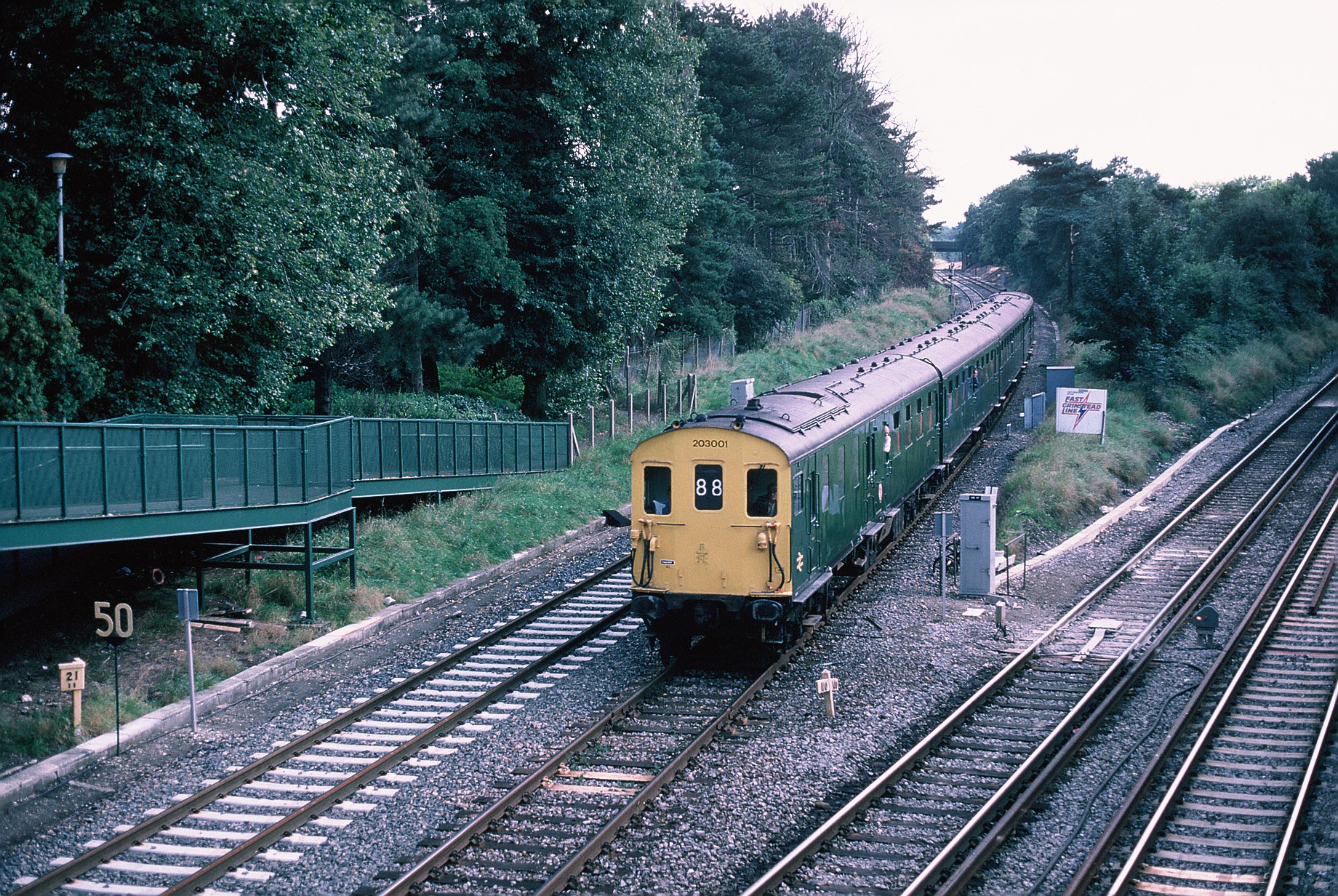
- 203001 on the Uckfield Line in 1987.
- In service: 1958–1990
- Number built: 7 units
- Formation: DMBSO-TSOL-TBU-TFK-TSOL-DMBSO
- Operators: Southern Region of British Railways
- Lines served: Hastings Line

Specifications
- Maximum speed: 75 mph (121 km/h)
- Weight: 55 long tons (56 t; 62 short tons)
- Prime mover(s): English Electric 4SRKT Mark II
- Power output: 500 bhp (370 kW) at 850 rpm
- Track gauge: 4 ft 8 1/2 in (1,435 mm)

The British Rail Class 203, initially classified 6B, was a type of diesel-electric train. Seven units, numbered 1031-1037, were constructed in 1958 for use on the Southern Region. They were similar to the earlier Class 202 units, differing only in the substitution of a trailer buffet car for one of the three trailer second opens.

== Operations ==
The units were delivered in 1958 in the then-standard British Railways green livery. They worked initially on the Hastings–Tonbridge–London Charing Cross/Cannon Street line.

In 1963, the number of buffet cars was reduced to five to reflect falling demand, with units 1031 and 1032 losing the carriages; 1031 was converted to standard 6L (202) formation while 1032 lost another car to replace a damaged car in another unit and ran with two TFKs, downgraded to TSK, from Class 201; the rest of these units were used in the formation of 3R(206) "Tadpole" units 1201-1206. The TSKs were later transferred to a 6S(201) unit and replaced with two standard 6L(202) TSOs, and 1032 became another standard Class 202 unit. The two buffet cars removed from the units were stored and later converted for departmental use.

Between 1972 and 1977, two units worked a Brighton–Southampton–Salisbury–Exeter St Davids service and return on Saturdays only. Class 203s were also used occasionally in place of Class 205 or Class 207 units on the Oxted Line and Class 206 units between Reading and Tonbridge.

At least one Class 203 unit was repainted in all-over Rail Blue with the carriage numbers repositioned higher, before all five remaining buffet units became blue and grey. Yellow squares and later yellow ends were added during repainting. In the 1980s, the remaining five buffet cars were withdrawn and scrapped. The remaining five Class 203s became five-car units, with one shortened to four cars to run the Tonbridge–Tunbridge Wells shuttle when the Tunbridge Wells-Eridge service was withdrawn as part of the Tonbridge–Bopeep Junction electrification scheme.

Upon the completion of this scheme, almost all Class 201, 202, and 203 units were withdrawn, although a motor brake second open and trailer composite corridor (TCK) was used briefly to reinstate Class 206 unit 1206. Class 202 "6L" Unit 1011, however, continued in service as a 4-car unit. For unclear reasons, it was renumbered into the Class 203 sequence when the TOPS system was introduced, becoming 203001. It was used on the Marshlink Line until 1990, when it was converted for departmental use and renumbered 1067. It was again renumbered to 1067 and repainted into Network SouthEast livery. It was withdrawn in 1994.

== Technical details ==
Power car (two per six-car set)

- Introduced: 1958
- Weight: 55 tons
- Engine: English Electric 4-cylinder type 4SRKT (Supercharged Redesigned K-type Transport) Mark II supercharged to 500 bhp (370 kW) at 850 rpm
- Transmission: Electric, two English Electric type 507 traction motors of 250 hp (190 kW)
- Maximum tractive effort: Not known
- Driving wheel diameter: Not known
- Coupling code: Not known
- Train heating: Electric

== Preservation ==
Two vehicles survive: DB975025 Caroline and S60750. S60750, the buffet removed from unit 1031 in 1963, was used for tilt tests in the 1980s for the Advanced Passenger Train. This vehicle was fitted with a centre executive section, a urinal, and a classroom at one end which also had windows fitted for use when the vehicle was propelled at the Old Dalby test track, and was later used for airflow tests before being rescued first by Hastings Diesels Ltd at St. Leonards Depot and subsequently by the Hastings 60750 Group. In 2011, the vehicle came under the care of the APT-E Conservation and Support Group and moved to the Electric Railway Museum, Warwickshire, near Coventry.

== See also ==
- British Rail Classes 201, 202 and 203
