= British Rail Class 411 =

British Third Rail EMU Train

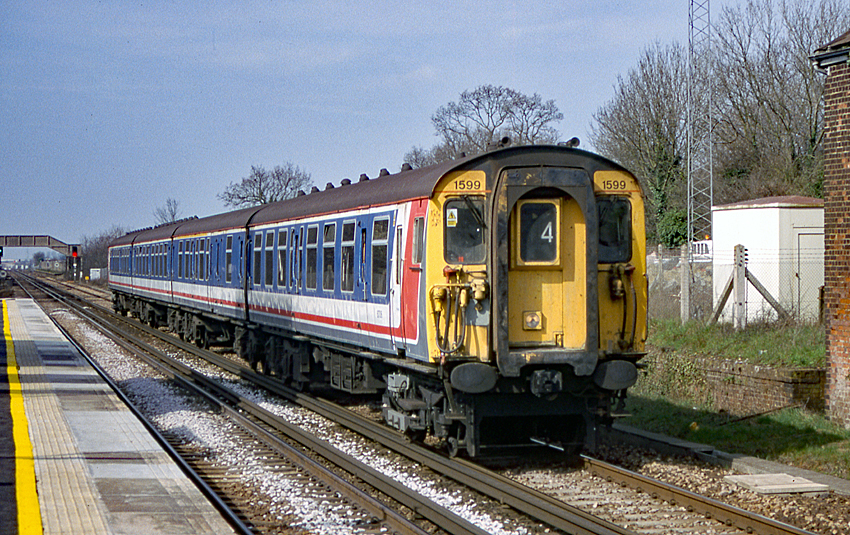
- BR Class 411/5 4-CEP 1599 at Westenhanger in Network SouthEast livery in 2000
- In service: 1956–2005
- Manufacturer: BR Eastleigh
- Number built: 135 trainsets
- Formation: power car + 2 trailer cars + power car
- Operators: British Rail; Network SouthEast; South West Trains; Connex South Central; Connex South Eastern; South Eastern Trains

Specifications
- Train length: 265 ft 8 1/2 in (80.988 m)
- Width: 9 ft 3 in (2.82 m)
- Height: 12 ft 6 in (3.81 m)
- Maximum speed: 90 mph (140 km/h)
- Weight: Total - 159.4 t (156.9 long tons; 175.7 short tons)
- Traction motors: Four
- Power output: 4 x 250 hp (190 kW) total 1,000 hp (750 kW)
- Electric system: 750 V DC third rail
- Current collection: Contact shoe
- Coupling system: Drop-head buckeye
- Track gauge: 4 ft 8 1/2 in (1,435 mm) standard gauge

The British Rail Class 411 (4CEP) electric multiple units were built at Eastleigh works from 1956–63 for the newly electrified main lines in Kent. These units, which used the British Railways Mark 1 bodyshell, were based on the earlier Southern Railway 4 COR design, built in 1937. Variants of the class 411 design included the Class 410 and Class 412 4 BEP units, which contained a buffet car in place of a standard trailer. They were later used on services in Sussex and Hampshire; following the privatisation of British Rail in 1995, the units were used by the Connex South Central, Connex South Eastern and South West Trains franchises. They were replaced by Juniper, Desiro, and Electrostar units. The fleet's lifespan was 49 years. These units are the longest-lived BR Mark 1 EMUs.

== Description ==
A total of 133 units were built, as two different types. The majority of units were 'standard' passenger-only units, complemented by units containing a buffet car.

=== Standard units ===
The standard units contained passenger seating only, and formed the backbone of the new fleet. 111 units were built in several batches, initially numbered in the range 7101-7211. Units 7101-7104 were the prototype units initially designated 4COR(EPB). These were followed by 'Phase 1' units (7105-7153) and subsequently 'Phase 2' units (7154-7211).

Units were formed of two outer driving motors cars with 2nd class (later Standard Class) seating in open saloons, sandwiching two intermediate trailer cars – one a corridor second and the other a First/Second corridor composite.

=== 4 BEP units ===
The 4 BEP units were similar to the standard units, but contained a buffet car in place of the second class open trailer. The buffet trailer had a dining room, a large kitchen pantry, and a buffet counter with some seats.

22 units were built, initially numbered in the range 7001-7022. The first two units (7001-7002) were prototypes, and were followed by 'Phase 1' units (7003-7012) and 'Phase 2' (7013-7022).

The 4 BEP fleet were classified as Class 410 by British Rail under the new computer numbering system introduced in 1968.

== Vehicle numbering ==
The numbering of individual vehicles and details of when units were built are shown in the table below.

Phase	Type	Unit Nos.	Years Built	DMBSO	TCK	TSK (*TRB)	DMBSO
Prototypes	4 CEP	7101-7104	1956	61033-61039 (odd)	70037-70040	70033-70036	61034-61040 (even)
Prototypes	4 BEP	7001-7002	1957	61041-61043 (odd)	70041-70042	69000-69001*	61042-61044 (even)
Phase 1	4 CEP	7105-7110	1958	61229-61239 (odd)	70235-70240	70229-70234	61230-61240 (even)
Phase 1	4 CEP	7111-7153	1958–59	61304-61388 (even)	70303-70345	70260-70302	61305-61389 (odd)
Phase 1	4 BEP	7003-7012	1958–59	61390-61408 (even)	70346-70355	69002-69011*	61391-61409 (odd)
Phase 2	4 CEP	7154-7202	1960–61	61694-61790 (even)	70552-70600	70503-70551	61695-61791 (odd)
Phase 2	4 CEP	7203-7204	1961	61868-61870 (even)	70043-70044	70241-70242	61869-61871 (odd)
Phase 2	4 CEP	7205-7211	1963	61948-61960 (even)	70653-70659	70660-70666	61949-61961 (odd)
Phase 2	4 BEP	7013-7022	1961	61792-61810 (even)	70601-70610	69012-69021*	61793-61811 (odd)

== Refurbishment ==
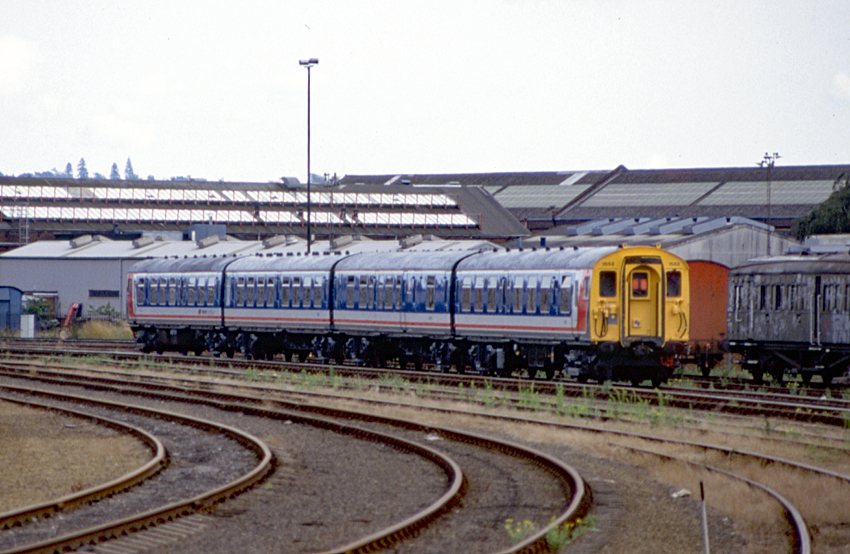
BR 4-CEP 1553 freshly outshopped at Eastleigh works

During the late 1970s and early 1980s, British Rail recognised that the 4 CEP fleet was in need of refurbishment. This was carried out at BR's Swindon Works. Refurbishment included moving the guard's compartment from both the motor cars to one of the intermediate trailers. Many of the 4BEP fleet were converted to standard units, since the requirement for buffet cars had declined.

The first refurbished unit was no. 7153, which was later renumbered to 1500. This unit was experimentally refurbished in 1975 at Eastleigh Works. Following evaluation, the contract for the refurbishment of the rest of the fleet was awarded to BR's Swindon Works. At the same time, units were renumbered from their original sequence into the later BR standard system reflecting TOPS class and sub-class, though in Southern Region style, only the last four digits were carried - so for example 411 501 was abbreviated to 1501. Units were renumbered in order of refurbishment, not reflecting their original numerical order. Subsequent refurbished standard units were renumbered in the range 1501–1621, and reclassified as Class 411/5. Only seven 4 BEP units were retained and refurbished, being renumbered in the range 2301–2307, and reclassified as Class 412/3. The remaining 4BEP units were converted into 4CEP units by replacing the buffet car with a standard trailer converted from conventional locomotive-hauled coaching stock. Refurbished buffet cars had a small dining room, while a second class room, seating 24, took the place of the buffet.

=== 4 TEP units ===
Between 1983 and 1986, several 4 Big units required extensive refurbishment. To cover their workings, four temporary 4 TEP units were created, formed of three carriages from a refurbished CEP unit, with an unrefurbished buffet car from a BEP unit. The units were renumbered in the range 2701–2704. They were based at Brighton depot and operated mostly on the London to Hastings line. The units were disbanded by 1986, once the refurbishment programme was complete, and were reformed as standard 4 CEP units. The unrefurbished buffet carriages were scrapped.

Unit formation are given below:

Unit No.			Vehicle Nos.			
New 4 TEP	Ex. 4 CEP	Ex. 4 BEP	DMSO	TBC	TSRB	DMSO
2701	1556 (ex-7144)	7011	61371	70336	69010	61370
2702	1557 (ex-7127)	7022	61337	70331	69021	61360
2703	1560 (ex-7152)	7021	61387	70344	69020	61386
2704	1558 (ex-7139)	7018	61361	70319	69017	61336

== Final operations ==
After rail privatisation in the mid-1990s, the different divisions of British Rail were divided up into different franchises. The three former SR division; South-Eastern, South Central and South-Western; all operated 4 CEP units, and are dealt with separately here.

=== Connex South Central ===
The South Central (SC) division, operated as Connex South Central, briefly operated 4 CEP units in the period 1995–1998. Three standard units were converted to Class 411/6 by fitting them with high-speed Mk.6 motor bogies. These units were renumbered into the series 1697–1699. They were chiefly employed on London Bridge to Brighton express services. However, as the units were non-standard in the SC fleet, they were withdrawn and transferred to South West Trains.

=== South Eastern Trains ===
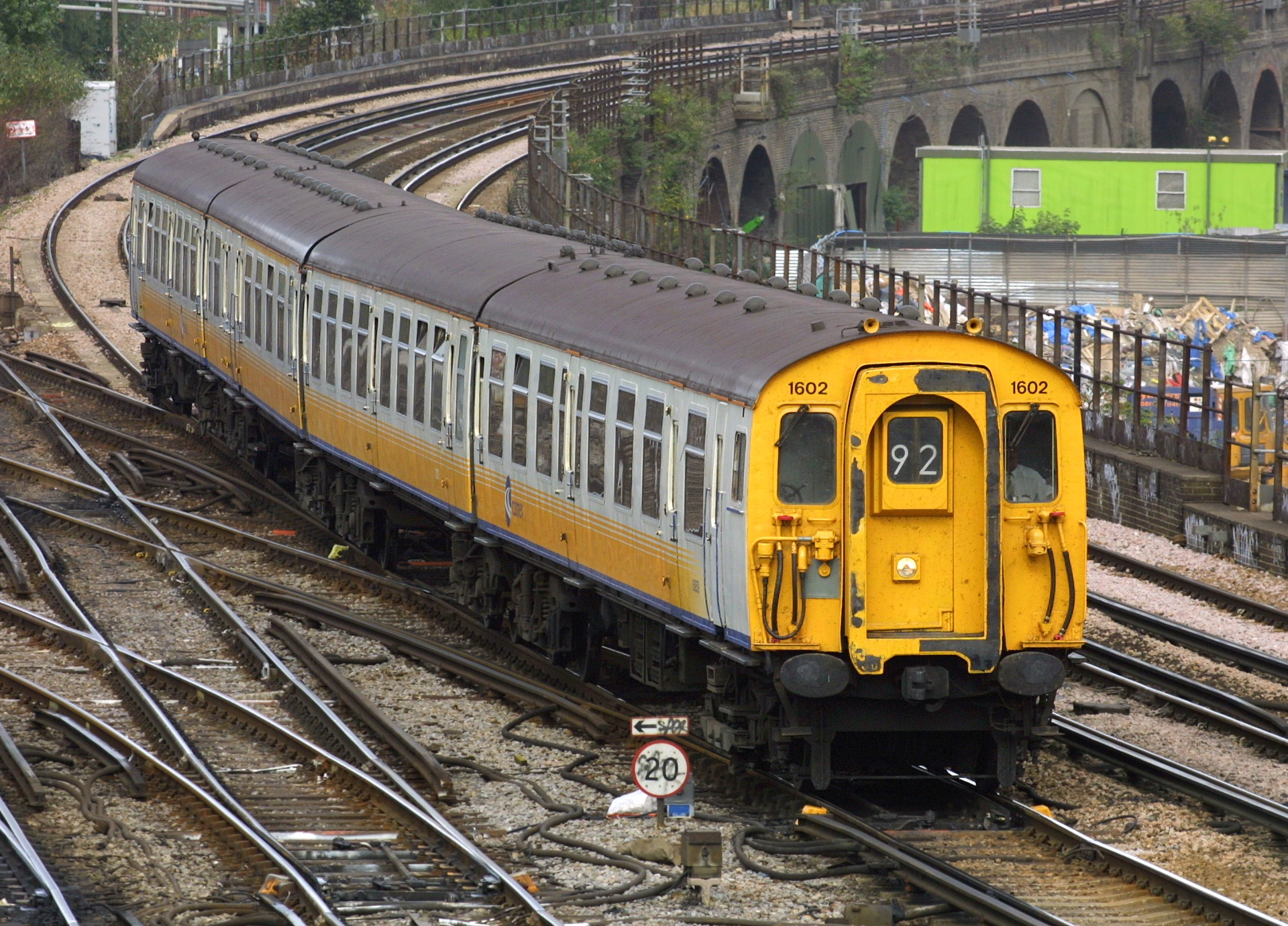
1602 at Wandsworth Road

The South Eastern (SE) division inherited the largest fleet of 4 CEP units. The franchise was originally operated by Connex South Eastern, but after Connex lost the franchise it became South Eastern Trains. In 1996, when the franchise was awarded, a fleet of 85 standard units were in traffic. Many of these were quickly withdrawn from traffic, or transferred to the SW division. In early 1999, five units were converted to Class 411/9 3CEP units, with the removal of the second class open trailer. These removed trailers had not had so much work carried out on them at the time of refurbishment (as they were basically unchanged apart from cosmetic appearance and installation of hopper windows) and many had become severely corroded. This was necessary, as some stations could only accommodate 11 carriages. A further 13 units were later converted. The 3 CEP units were renumbered into the series 1101–1118.

The Connex fleet contained two 'celebrity' units. The first, no. 1592, was repainted by staff at Ramsgate depot into its original Green livery, to commemorate the final months in traffic for these units. The second, no. 1602, was the only 4 CEP unit repainted into Connex livery, after it collided with another train outside London Bridge station, and had to be repaired at Eastleigh works. Both of these units were popular with railtours and excursion trains.

Withdrawal of units started in 1999, after they were replaced by new Class 375 'Electrostar' units. The original aim was to totally replace the 4 CEP fleet by 2000. However, poor reliability of the new units saw the 4 CEP's retained beyond this date. By the end of 2002, the fleet was again being reduced, with many standard units being sent to Immingham for scrap. The 3 CEP units were all withdrawn by March 2003, as units in traffic beyond this date had to be fitted with TPWS equipment. In the event, only seven units, nos. 1562, 1590, 1592, 1593, 1594, 1602 and 1615 were retained.

By the beginning of 2004, the seven units were withdrawn as they were due overhaul. They were replaced with units cascaded from South West Trains, which included the three Class 411/6 units. However, these units were themselves slowly retired, and it was expected the final units would have been withdrawn from service before the end of 2004. However, the Class 411/6 units were eventually withdrawn in July 2005, following the introduction of refurbished Class 465/9 "Networkers". Units 1697 and 1699 were sent for scrap, but 1698 was retained for working railtours. Due to a unit shortage It was later reinstated in August 2005, and remained in traffic until late September. It was one of three units to work a Ramsgate to Weymouth railtour, the others being 4 Cig 1866 and 4Vep 3545. Following this, it was quickly despatched for scrap.

=== South West Trains ===
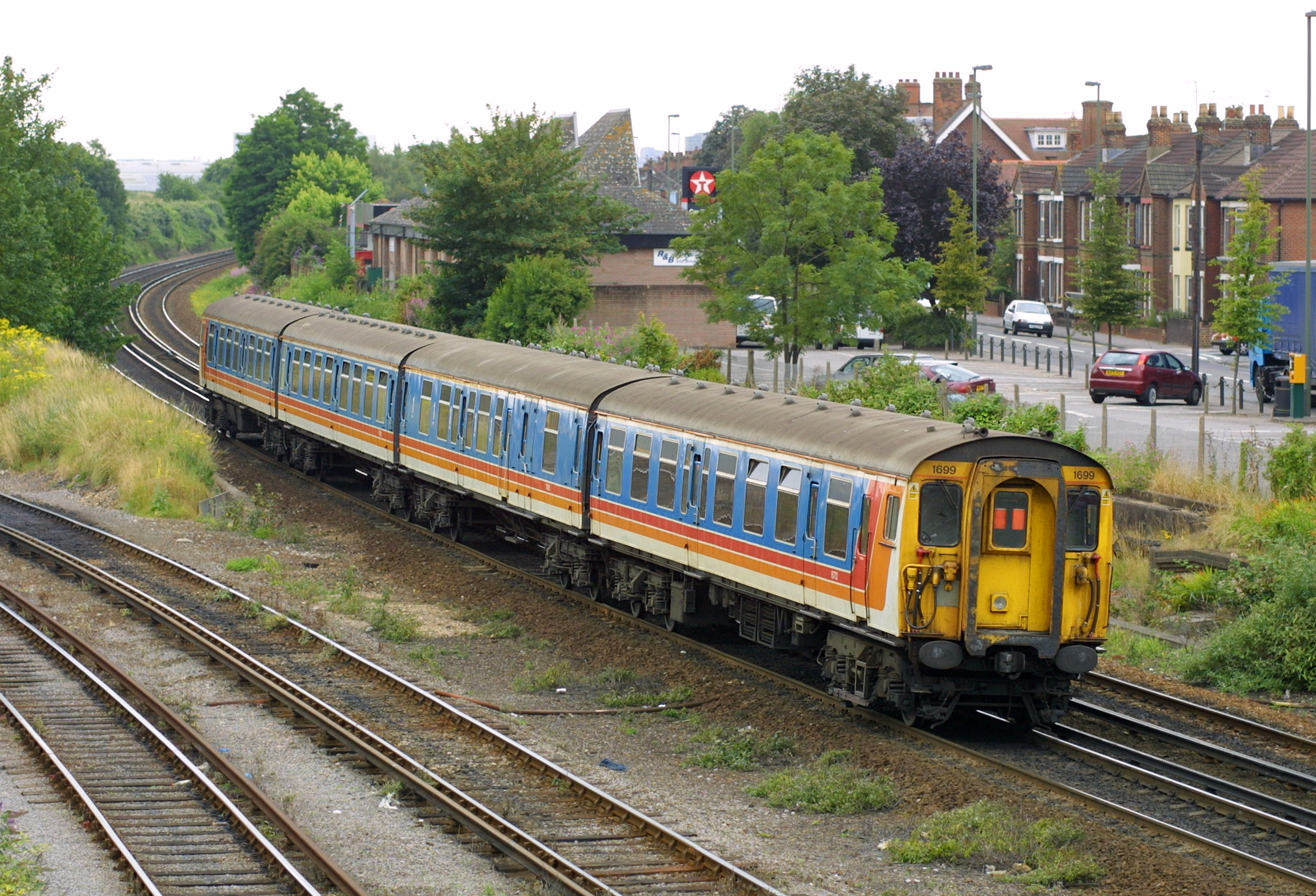
1699 at Eastleigh

The South West (SW) division franchise was won by the Stagecoach Group and was operated as South West Trains (SWT). SWT did not inherit any standard 4 CEP units, but it did operate the seven 4 BEP units. However, in 1996, a shortage of trains led to SWT hiring two sets (nos. 1568 and 1589) on a short-term lease. These units were quickly followed by more, until by 1998, SWT had a fleet of 29 standard 4 CEP units. These were gradually overhauled, and were employed on a range of duties, including services to Portsmouth, Reading, Southampton, Bournemouth and Weymouth. Additionally, units commonly worked services on the Lymington branch.

The fleet stayed reasonably static until 2002, when SWT reformed several sets. The buffet cars from the 4 BEP units were inserted into seven standard units, which were renumbered 2321–2327 (reclassified as Class 412/2). The displaced carriages were inserted into the 4 BEP units, which were renumbered 2311–2317 (reclassified as Class 412/1). The reason behind this was that the 4 BEP units had faster acceleration, and the buffet cars were no longer used. Therefore, the reformations allowed a higher seating capacity in the faster units.

By 2003, SWT had ordered new trains, to replace all its slam door trains. These were designated Class 444 for express trains and Class 450 for suburban trains. The first units to be replaced were the units in the 232x series, which were due for early withdrawal. Of the seven sets, one, set no. 2323, was withdrawn in 2002 due to fire damage, but was later converted back to a standard unit. Another, set no. 2326, was reduced to a 3 CEP, for operating the "Lymington Flyer" service on the Lymington branch, and was renumbered 1199. The remaining five units lasted until December 2003, when they were withdrawn. One, set no. 2325 was preserved, whilst the rest were scrapped.

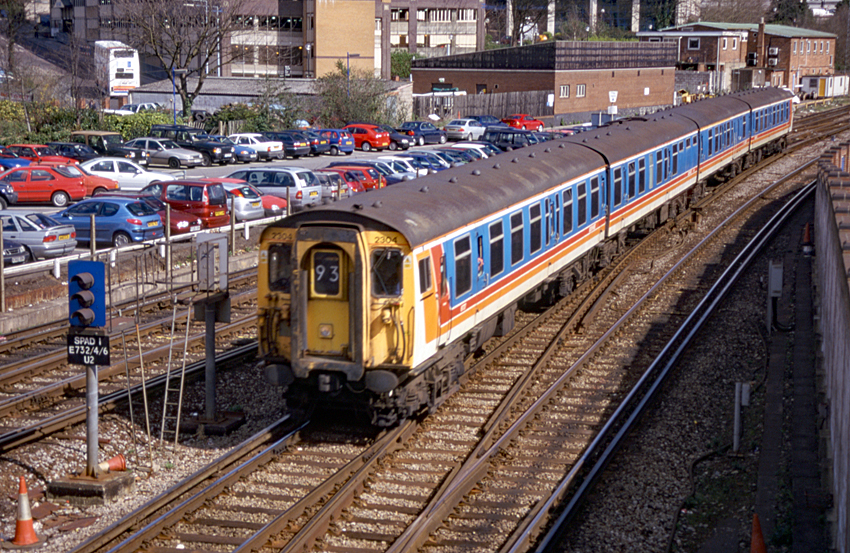
Class 412/3 4-BEP 2304 at Southampton Central

The standard units lasted until early 2004, when they were either withdrawn and scrapped, or transferred to South Eastern Trains. One of the 4 BEP units, no. 2314, was converted into a 3CEP to replace no. 1199, and was renumbered 1198. Of the remaining six 4 BEP units, four were withdrawn in October 2004, leaving just two units remaining in traffic into 2005. The 3 CEP unit, no. 1198, was withdrawn at the end of December 2004, and was preserved by the EMU Preservation Society on the Dartmoor Railway before moving in 2008 to the Pontypool and Blaenavon Railway and then in 2013 to the Chinnor and Princes Risborough Railway. A replacement came in the form of 3Cig unit no. 1499. The final two 4 BEP units 2311 and 2315, soldiered on in traffic until withdrawal in March 2005. They were both later preserved at the Eden Valley Railway as 4CEPs.

== Further use and departmental units ==
Over the years, several unit have seen further use as departmental units. These are listed below:

- 7102 – Converted to Tractor Unit 932080. Scrapped in 1996
- 1500 – Converted to Tractor Unit 932081. Scrapped in 1996
- 1505 – Converted to Route-learning Unit 930082 for use by Southern, including removal of end-gangways. Later converted to static training unit at Selhurst depot. Sent for scrap in September 2005.
- 1512 – Used as a 3-car Tractor Unit by South West Trains at Bournemouth depot. Scrapped in June 2005 after being replaced by a Class 73 electro-diesel locomotive.
- 1545 – Converted to 3 car test unit 932545 and exported to Sweden. Converted to AC Overhead Line and DC Dual Voltage and was a test bed for IGBT and Adtranz Traction Package. Scrapped there in 2002.
- 1620 – Converted to test unit 932620 for central door locking trials. Then used for paint trials at Eastleigh Works. Scrapped in November 2005.

== Accidents and incidents ==
- On 4 January 1969, units 7181 and 7117 formed a passenger train that overran a signal in thick fog and ran into the rear of a parcels train near Marden, Kent. As a consequence, three cars of unit 7181 were written off.
- On 15 July 1970, unit 7015 collided with a lorry on an occupation crossing between Chartham and Chilham, Kent due to errors by the crossing keeper. The driver of the lorry and the guard of the train were killed.
- On 28 January 1993, unit 1521 overran the buffers at Ramsgate Depot, with one driving carriage left perched precariously above houses.

== Preservation ==
Four complete units have been saved for preservation.

- 4 BEP unit no. 2325 (containing 3 coaches of ex 1537, ex-7105) has been preserved by the EPB Preservation Group, is currently split in different locations with the centre cars being at the Epping Ongar Railway and the driving ends at Eastleigh Works. This set was the first of the production units to be built, and it is hoped to restore it to its original condition. in January 2014, the two motor coaches were moved by road and rail to Eastleigh Works for this to begin. As of September 2016 one driving end is stripped and the other is in store.
- 4 BEP unit no. 2304 has been preserved by the EMU Preservation Society on the Chinnor and Princes Risborough Railway. It was moved in May 2008 from the Dartmoor Railway to the Pontypool and Blaenavon Railway until August 2013, immediately prior to that railway's closure pending re-organisation. This unit was converted from former 4 BEP unit 1198 (ex-2314, ex-2304, ex-7175) for use on the Lymington Branch Line. In 2019 the unit was renumbered to 2304 and a former BEP buffet coach 69345 was purchased to be attached to the unit.
- 4 BEP units nos. 2311 and 2315 (which contains the other coach of 1537, ex-7105) are preserved on the Eden Valley Railway. These were the final two 4BEP units in service with South West Trains.
- Both driving motor coaches from unit no. 1589 (ex-7178) were preserved on the Dartmoor Railway, but was scrapped in September 2021. Its TBC carriage can be found at Snibston Discovery Park in Leicestershire, and its TSO carriage was in now disbanded Cig 1393, at the Whitwell & Reepham railway station.
- The TBC 70345 from unit no. 1500 (ex-7153), which was also in 1547, is currently preserved In a Private Garden in Sutton Bridge.

The full list is shown below. Complete units are highlighted:

Unit Number (current in bold)				Type	Phase	DMBS	TC (+TBC)	TS (*TRSB)	DMBS	Livery	Location	Notes
7016	2305	**2315**	-	4 CEP	Phase 2	61798	70354	70229	61799	South West Trains	Eden Valley Railway	70229 was in 1537/7105 originally
7019	2301	**2311**	-	4 CEP	Phase 2	61804	70607	70539	61805	South West Trains	Eden Valley Railway	-
**7105**	1537	2325	-	4 BEP	Phase 1	61229	70235	-	61230	South West Trains	Unit Split – 2 motor coaches at Eastleigh, one being refurbished, one stored. Trailer coach and Buffet car at Epping Ongar Railway, stored, not in use, requires repaint.	
**7113**	1524	-	-	4 CEP	Phase 1	-	-	70262	-	BR Green	Hastings Diesels	Operates with preserved Class 201 unit 1001.
7124	1530	**1392**	-	4 CEP	Phase 1	-	-	70273	-	BR Blue/Grey	Dartmoor Railway	Ex 4-CIG No. 1392, Now removed from unit and stored on Dartmoor Railway.
7135	**1520**	-	-	4 CEP	Phase 1	-	-	70284	-	Network SouthEast	Northamptonshire Ironstone	-
7143	1554	**1398**	-	4 CEP	Phase 1	-	-	70292	-	Carmine and cream	Highland Heritage and Cultural Centre, Grantown-on-Spey	Operated in 4 Cig unit 1398. Moved to Grantown-on-Spey in 2016.
7147	**1559**	-	-	4 CEP	Phase 1	-	-	70296	-	Network SouthEast	Northamptonshire Ironstone	-
7153	1500	**1547**	-	4 CEP	Phase 1	-	70345+	-	-	Network SouthEast	Sutton Bridge	Unit 7153 was the prototype refurbished unit, latterly renumbered 1500.
7161	**1597**	-	-	4 CEP	Phase 2	-	-	70510	-	Network SouthEast	Northamptonshire Ironstone	-
7175	**2304**	2314	1198	4 BEP	Phase 2	61736	70573	69345	61737	BR Blue & Grey	Chinnor and Princes Risborough Railway	Unit 1198 was dedicated to the "Lymington Flyer" service. Has now been officially named 'Linda the Lymington Flyer'
**7178**	1589	-	-	4 CEP	Phase 2	-	70576+	-	-	BR Green	Snibston Discovery Park	Converted to vacuum brake
7178	1589	**1393**	-	4 CEP	Phase 2	-	-	70527	-	Carmine & Cream	Whitwell & Reepham railway station	Operated with 4CIG unit 1393. Now loose
7182	1610	**1396**	-	4 CEP	Phase 2	-	-	70531	-	Carmine & Cream	Highland Heritage and Cultural Centre, Grantown-on-Spey	Operated in 4 Cig unit 1396. Moved to Grantown-on-Spey in 2016.
7198	1569	207203		4 CEP	Phase 2	-	-	70547	-	BR Green	Private site, Hungerford	Now static. Source Farm Shop, Hungerford.
7200	1567	**207202**		4 CEP	Phase 2	-	-	70549	-	BR Green	East Lancashire Railway	Now static. Converted to a storage unit with windows plated over.

== Fleet details ==
Unrefurbished Units

Class	Type	No. Built (Converted*)	Year built (Converted*)	No. Range	Withdrawn	Notes
Class 410	4 BEP	22	1957–63	7001-7022	1984	Refurbished 1979–1984.
Class 411	4 CEP	111	1956–63	7101-7211	1984	Refurbished 1979–1984.
Class 482/7	4 TEP	4*	1982*	2701–2704	1986	Converted back to standard 4CEP.

Refurbished Units

Class	Type	No. Converted	Year Converted	No. Range	Operator	Unit Numbers	Withdrawn	No. preserved
Class 411/6	3 CEP	6	1993	1401–1406	BR	1401–1406	1994	-
Class 411/3	4 CEP	1	1975	1500	BR	1500	1990	-
Class 411/4	4 CEP	5	1979–84	1501–1505	BR	1501–1505	1993	-
Class 411/5	4 CEP	116	1979–84	1506–1621	SET	1509/11/51/60/62/64/70/74-76/82/84-88/90-95/99, 1602/07/09/11/14-16, 1517/35/39/50/55/71/78 (ex. SWT)	07/2004	-
Class 411/5	4 CEP	116	1979–84	1506–1621	SWT	1507/12/17/19/31/33-35/37-39/44/47/48/50/53/55, 1563/65/66/68/71/73/78/81, 1612	05/2004	-
Class 411/5	4 CEP	3	1995	1697–1699	SET	1697–1699 (ex. SWT)	09/2005	-
Class 411/5	4 CEP	3	1995	1697–1699	SWT	1697–1699	04/2004	-
Class 411/9	3 CEP	18	1999	1101–1118	SET	1101–1118	03/2003	1
Class 411/9	3 CEP	2	2003-04	1198–1199	SWT	1198–1199	12/2004	1
Class 412/3	4 BEP	7	1979–84	2301–2307	SWT	2301–2307	12/2002*	-
Class 412/1	4 BEP	7	2002	2311–2317	SWT	2311–2317	03/2005	2
Class 412/2	4 BEP	7	2002	2321–2327	SWT	2321–2327	12/2003	1

== Modelling ==
Bachmann have released a 00 gauge model of the 4-CEP in 2009, with 4-BEP due out in mid 2021. An N Gauge version of the 4-CEP was released in late 2011 by Graham Farish.
