= British Rail Class 207 =

Class of diesel-electric multiple unit

British Rail Class 207 (3D)
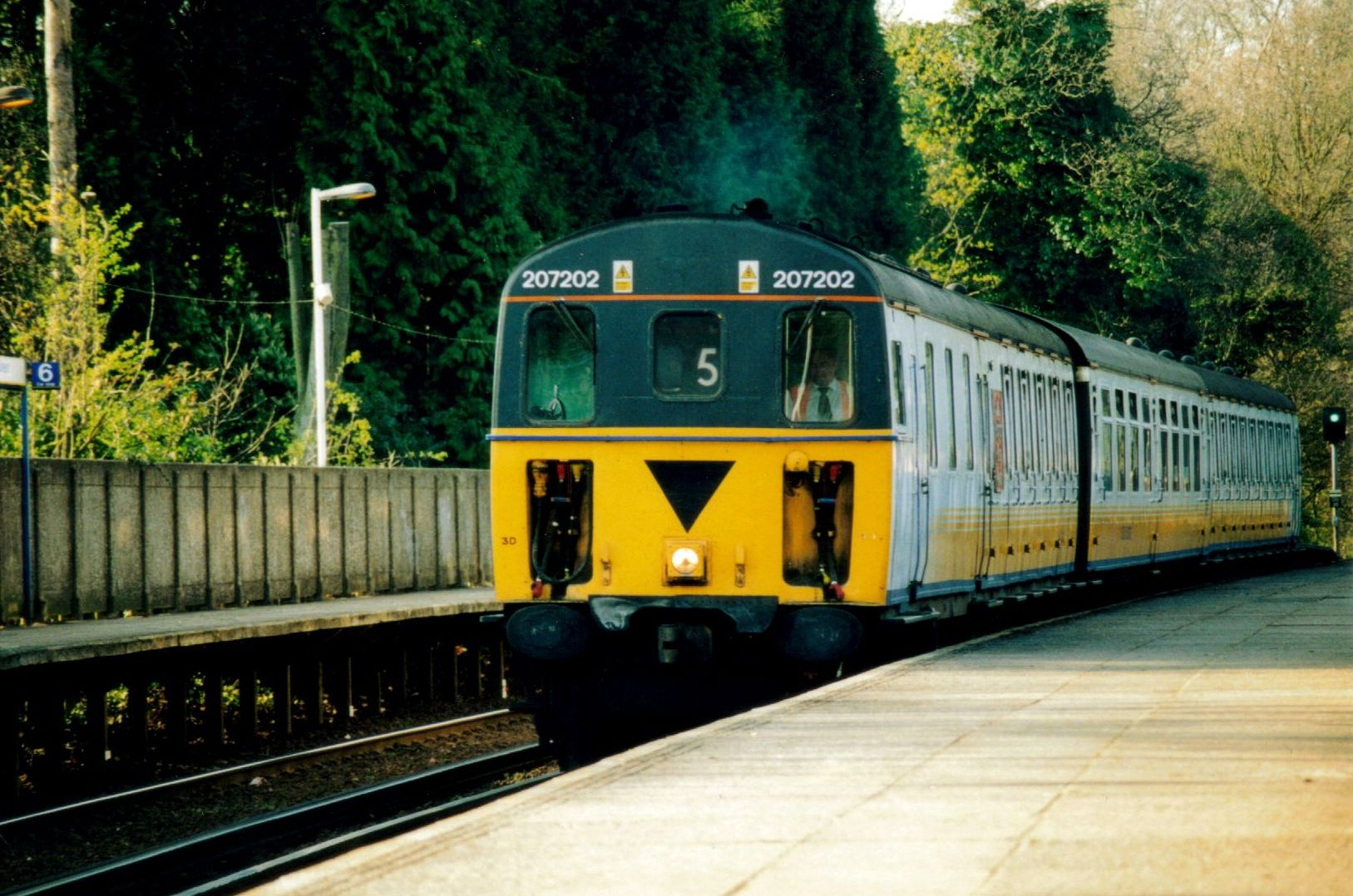
- South Central Class 207 at Hurst Green in 2002
- In service: 1962-2004
- Manufacturer: BR Eastleigh
- Number built: 19 trainsets
- Successor: Class 170
- Formation: 3 cars per trainset
- Operators: Southern Region of British Railways; Network South East; Connex South Central; Southern

Specifications
- Maximum speed: 75 mph (121 km/h)
- Weight: 56 long tons (56.9 t; 62.7 short tons)
- Prime mover: English Electric 4SRKT Mark II (4-cylinder diesel)
- Power output: 600 shp (450 kW) at 850 rpm
- Coupling system: Drophead buckeye
- Track gauge: 1,435 mm (4 ft 8 1/2 in) standard gauge

The British Rail Class 207 (3D) diesel-electric multiple units were built by BR at Eastleigh in 1962. The fleet had a lifespan of 42 years. The Southern Region class 201 to 207 DEMUs are nicknamed 'Thumpers' due to the distinctive sound of their engines.

== Operational history ==
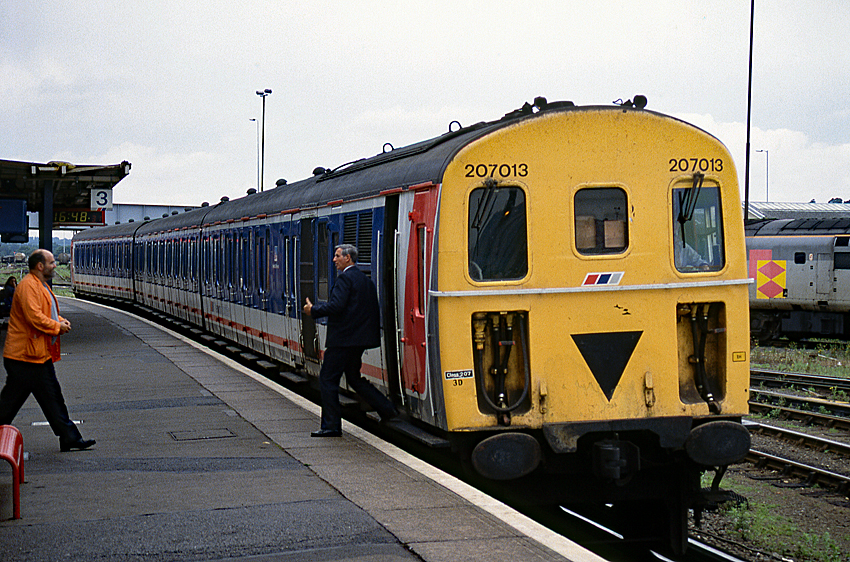
207013 3D East Sussex DMU at Eastleigh. The black triangle was an indication to station staff that the guard's compartment was located at this end of the unit.

When new the class were used on the Oxted Line, and were mostly concentrated on services between London Victoria and Uckfield and Eridge to Tonbridge via Tunbridge Wells. Other routes that the units operated included occasional workings on the Marshlink Line, the Three Bridges to Tunbridge Wells Central Line and the Cuckoo Line. Following the closure of the last two of these routes the unit gained workings on the Redhill to Tonbridge Line, and were known to deputise for 3R units on the North Downs Line to Reading. Most units were withdrawn in 1987 following the electrification of the Oxted Line's East Grinstead branch. Four of the seven surviving units were used on the Reading to Basingstoke Line between 1988 and 1993; once this had finished three were withdrawn and the fourth sent to join the other three survivors on the Marshlink Line; between 1995 and 1998 this included through services from Ashford International to Brighton. After this the class operated on the Marshlink Line between Ashford and Hastings and the Oxted Line between London Victoria and Uckfield for privatised companies Connex South Central and Southern. The final three units were withdrawn in August 2004.

== Technical details ==
Power car (one per set)

- Introduced: 1962
- Weight: 56 long tons (57 t; 63 short tons)
- Engine: English Electric 4-cylinder type 4SRKT Mark II of 600 bhp (450 kW) at 850 rpm
- Transmission: Electric, two English Electric type EE507 traction motors rated at 250 hp (190 kW) each.
- Maximum tractive effort: 12,500 lbf (56,000 N)
- Driving wheel diameter: 3 ft 6 in (1,067 mm)
- Coupling code: Standard 'Buck eye' compatible with contemporary Class 20x and 4xx units.
- Train heating: Electric

== Preservation ==
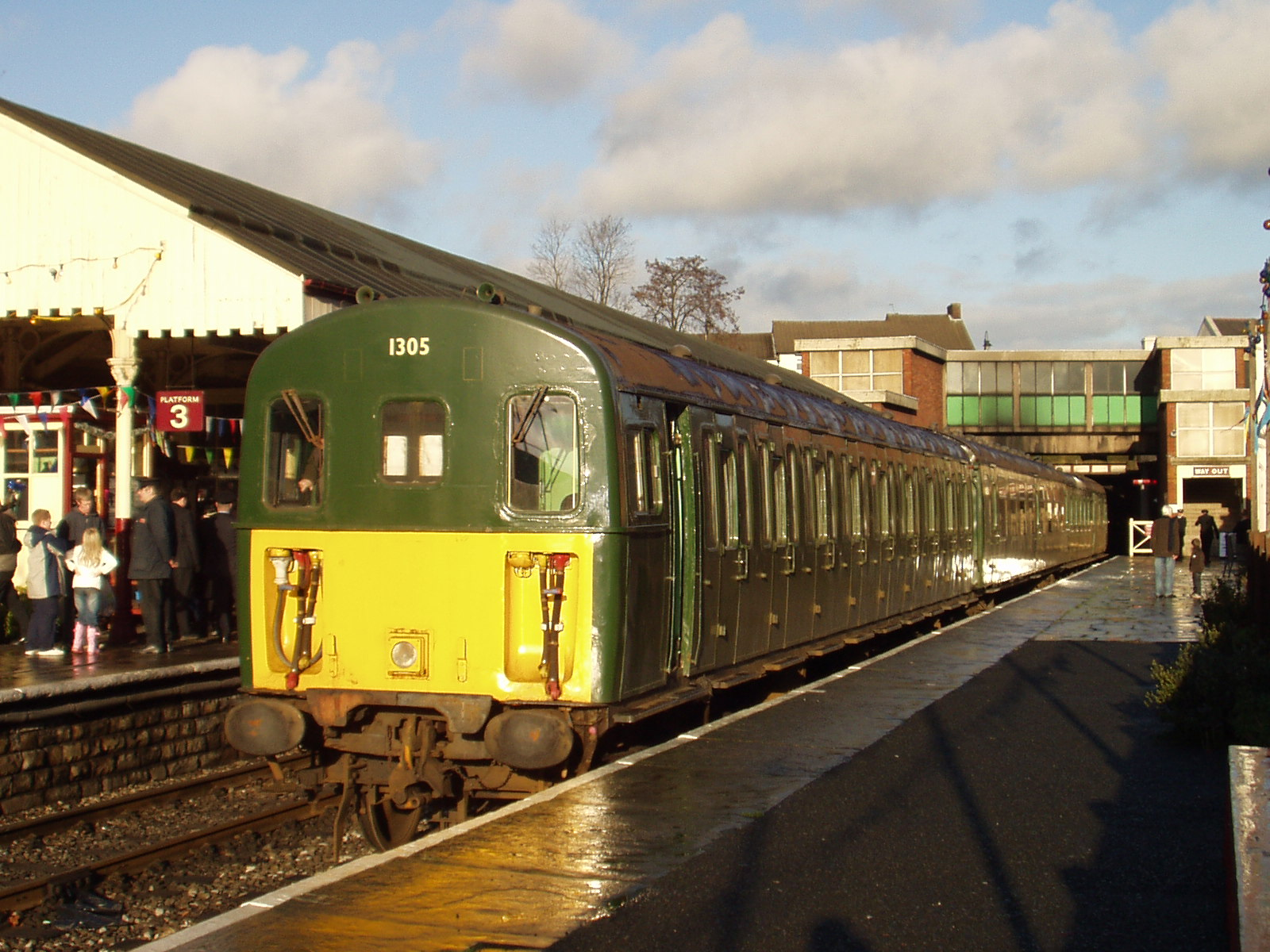
Unit 1305 (207202, with a former Class 411 centre coach in place of the original) operating at the East Lancashire Railway, Bury.

Three complete units have been preserved:

- 207017 – Spa Valley Railway (3-car unit)
- 207202 – Formerly owned by Coulsdon Old Vehicle & Engineering Society, Bicester (2-car unit numbered 1305); purchased by and moved to the Bluebell Railway in January 2023.
- Motor car 60127 from unit 207203 resides at the Spa Valley Railway as a source of spares for resident unit 207017. The unit was originally located at the Swindon and Cricklade Railway paired with a former Class 205 driving trailer car. The former 4-CEP centre trailer car, TSOL 70547 is situated on private land in Hungerford, Berkshire.

In addition, driving motor vehicle from unit 207013 has also been preserved:

- 207013 – DMBSO 60138 (cab only) – Reduced to just a cab in May 2016 and remaining section at the South Wales Cab Preservation Group.

DTSO 60901 from 207203 was preserved until it was damaged beyond repair in an arson attack on 20 May 2016; it was scrapped on 22 June that year.

== Fleet details ==
Key:	Preserved	Rebuilt	Departmental Use	Scrapped

Unrefurbished Class 207/0

Unit No.		Name	Final livery	DMBSO	TCsoL	DTSO	Withdrawn	Status
New	Old	Name	Final livery	DMBSO	TCsoL	DTSO	Withdrawn	Status
207001	1301	-	NSE	60126	60600	60900	04/1994	Scrapped
207002	1302	-	NSE	60127	60601	60901	1992	Converted to 207103
207003	1303	-	Blue/Grey	60128	60602	60902	09/1987	Scrapped
207004	1304	-	NSE	60129	60603	60903	07/1991	Converted to 207101
207005	1305	-	NSE	60130	60604	60904	07/1991	Converted to 207102
207006	1306	-	Blue/Grey	60131	60605	60905	09/1987	Scrapped
207007	1307	-	Blue/Grey	60132	60606	60906	09/1987	Scrapped
207008	1308	-	Blue/Grey	60133	60607	60907	05/1988	Scrapped
207009	1309	-	Blue/Grey	60134	60608	60908	09/1987	Scrapped
207010	1310	-	NSE	60135	60609	60909	09/1993	Tractor unit 951070
207011	1311	-	NSE	60136	60610	60910	05/1990	Sandite unit 1068
207012	1312	-	Blue/Grey	60137	60611	60911	09/1987	Scrapped
207013	1313	-	NSE	60138	60612	60912	03/1994	Tractor unit 951070
207014	1314	-	NSE	60139	60613	60913	05/1990	Sandite unit 1068
207015	1315	-	Blue/Grey	60140	60614	60914	9/1987	Scrapped
207016	1316	-	Blue/Grey	60141	60615	60915	10/1987	Scrapped
207017	1317	-	Connex	60142	60616	60916	03/2004	Preserved
207018	1318	-	Blue/Grey	60143	60617	60917	09/1987	Scrapped
207019	1319	-	Blue/Grey	60144	60618	60918	05/1988	Scrapped

Refurbished Class 207/1

Unit No.		Name	Final livery	DMBSO	DTSO	Withdrawn	Status
207101	207004	Ashford Fayre	NSE	60129	60903	1995	Converted to 207201
207102	207005	Brighton Royal Pavilion	NSE	60130	60904	1995	Converted to 207202
207103	207002	-	NSE	60127	60901	1995	Converted to 207203

Refurbished Class 207/2

Unit No.		Name	Final livery	DMBSO	TSOL	DTSO	Withdrawn	Status
207201	207101	Ashford Fayre	Connex	60129	70286	60903	2003	Scrapped
207202	207102	Brighton Royal Pavilion	Connex	60130	70549	60904	08/2004	Preserved
207203	207103	-	Connex	60127	70547	60901	08/2004	Preserved, 60901 destroyed by fire.

Departmental Units

Unit No.		Final livery	DMB	T	DMB (DT*)	Withdrawn	Status
-	1068	NSE	977700 (ex-60139)	977696 (ex-60522)	977701* (ex-60910)	1992	Scrapped
951070	1070	NSE	977906 (ex-60135)	-	977907 (ex-60138)	1998	Preserved

== Named units ==
The following units received names:

- 207201 Ashford Fayre
- 207202 Brighton Royal Pavilion
