= List of British Rail departmental multiple unit classes =

British departmental multiple unit classification system

The 900 series classes were reserved for multiple units in departmental stock, most of which were converted from old passenger units. In broad terms, Classes 930–935 were allocated to Southern Region multiple units (ex-200 and 400 series), 936 & 937 to other electrical multiple units (EMU) (ex-300 and 500 series) and 960 to other diesel multiple units (DMU) (ex-100 series). In recent years, this has been less rigidly adhered to.

== Diesel multiple units ==
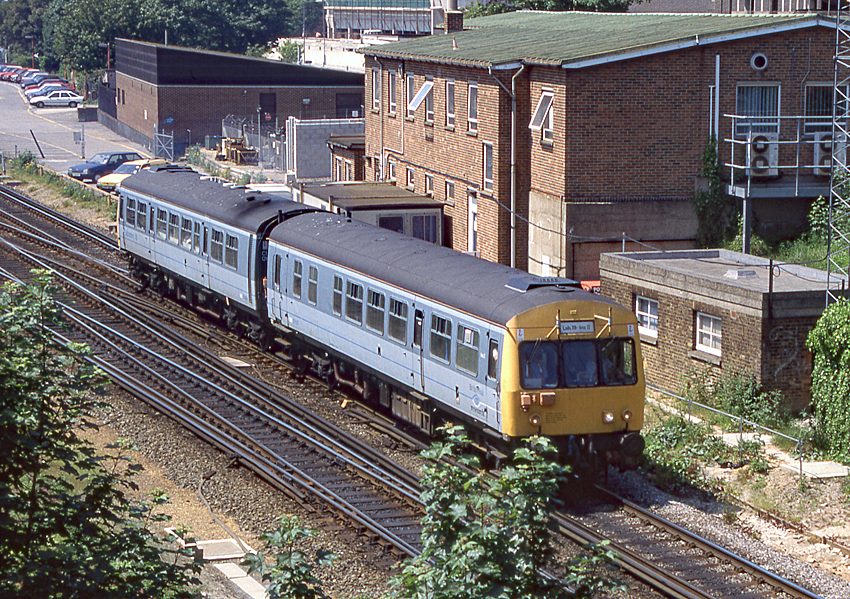
Class 960 RDB975010 BR Research Lab 19 Iris II at Southampton 1996

- Class 901 (Test units, ex-Class 101)
- Class 930 (Departmental SR DEMUs)
- Class 950 (Purpose-built test unit, similar to Class 150)
- Class 951 (Sandite/De-icer units, ex-Classes 201, 203, 205, and 207)
- Class 960 (Departmental DMUs)
- Class 999 (Prototype PPM for use in passenger trial)
- Multi-Purpose Vehicle (Purpose-built departmental vehicles, classes DR 970, 980 and 989)
- Mobile Maintenance Train (Track maintenance DMUs, classes DR 975, 976 and 978)

== Gas turbine multiple unit ==
- APT-E (Experimental Advanced Passenger Train unit)

== Electric multiple units ==
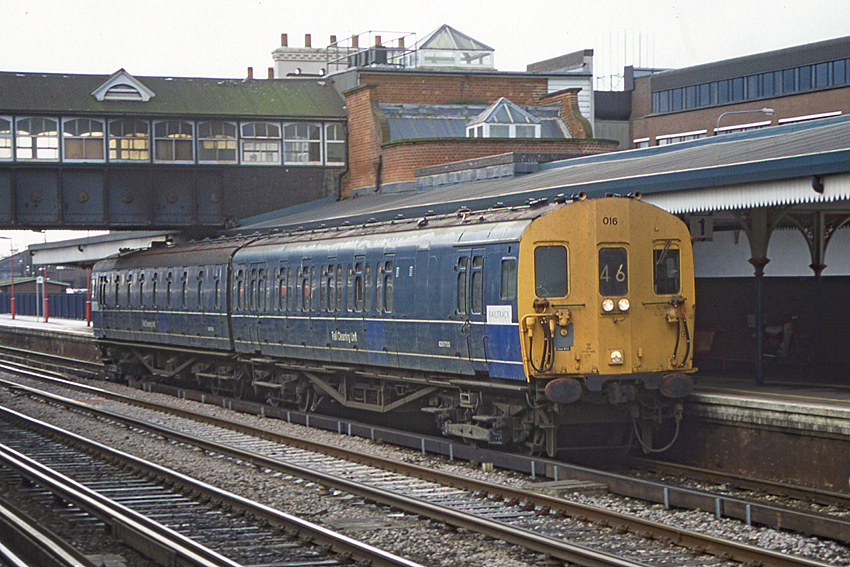
930016 rail cleaning unit: ex 4-EPB 5024 MBSOs at Eastleigh 1995

The original use for the Southern Region (SR) classes are included in brackets; these designations have been less rigidly applied in recent years.

- Class 910 (Test units, ex-Class 488)
- Class 920 (3PEP prototype unit)
- Class 930 (SR Sandite and de-icing units)
- Class 931 (SR route learning and stores units)
- Class 932 (SR research and tractor units)
- Class 933 (SR mobile instruction units)
- Class 935 (4PEP research units)
- Class 936 (Sandite units, ex-Classes 311 and 501)
- Class 937 (Sandite units, ex-Classes 302 and 308)
- Class 960 (Test units, ex-Classes 309 and 310)

== See also ==
- British Rail locomotive and multiple unit numbering and classification
- SR multiple unit numbering and classification
