= SR Class 3-SUB =

Class of British electric multiple units

Southern Railway 3-SUB Units
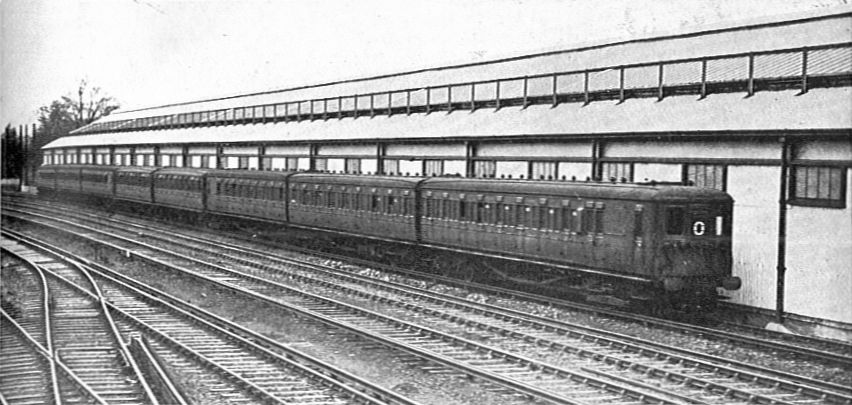
- South Eastern division electric multiple units sandwich a trailer set. Orpington, 1928
- In service: 1915-48
- Formation: power car + trailer car + power car
- Operators: London and South Western Railway, Southern Railway and British Railways (Southern Region).

Specifications
- Maximum speed: 75 mph (121 km/h)
- Prime movers: Early units: 4 x 275 hp (205 kW) traction motors total 1,100 hp (820 kW); Later units: 4 x 250 hp (190 kW) traction motors total 1,000 hp (750 kW)
- Braking system: Air (Westinghouse)
- Track gauge: 4 ft 8 1/2 in (1,435 mm)

The SR Class 3-SUB were DC suburban electric multiple units, introduced by the London and South Western Railway in 1915. They were constructed by the Southern Railway in the period up to 1939, and though the class designation 3-SUB was not used by the Southern Railway, some authors refer to these units as 3-SUB. When rebuilt to four cars in the 1940s, they became class 4-SUB.

== Background ==
The London, Brighton and South Coast Railway (LBSC) was the first of the three major companies that were to form the Southern Railway to electrify some of its lines in London. The lines were electrified at 6.7 kV 25 Hz AC, using overhead supply. Public services began on 1 December 1909.

The London and South Western Railway (LSWR) electrified its lines on the third rail DC system. Public services began on 25 October 1915.

In 1922, the South Eastern and Chatham Railway (SECR) sought permission to electrify certain lines in London. On 1 January 1923, the LSBC, LSWR and SECR were merged into the Southern Railway (SR).

== Classes ==
=== LSWR electric multiple units and trailer sets ===
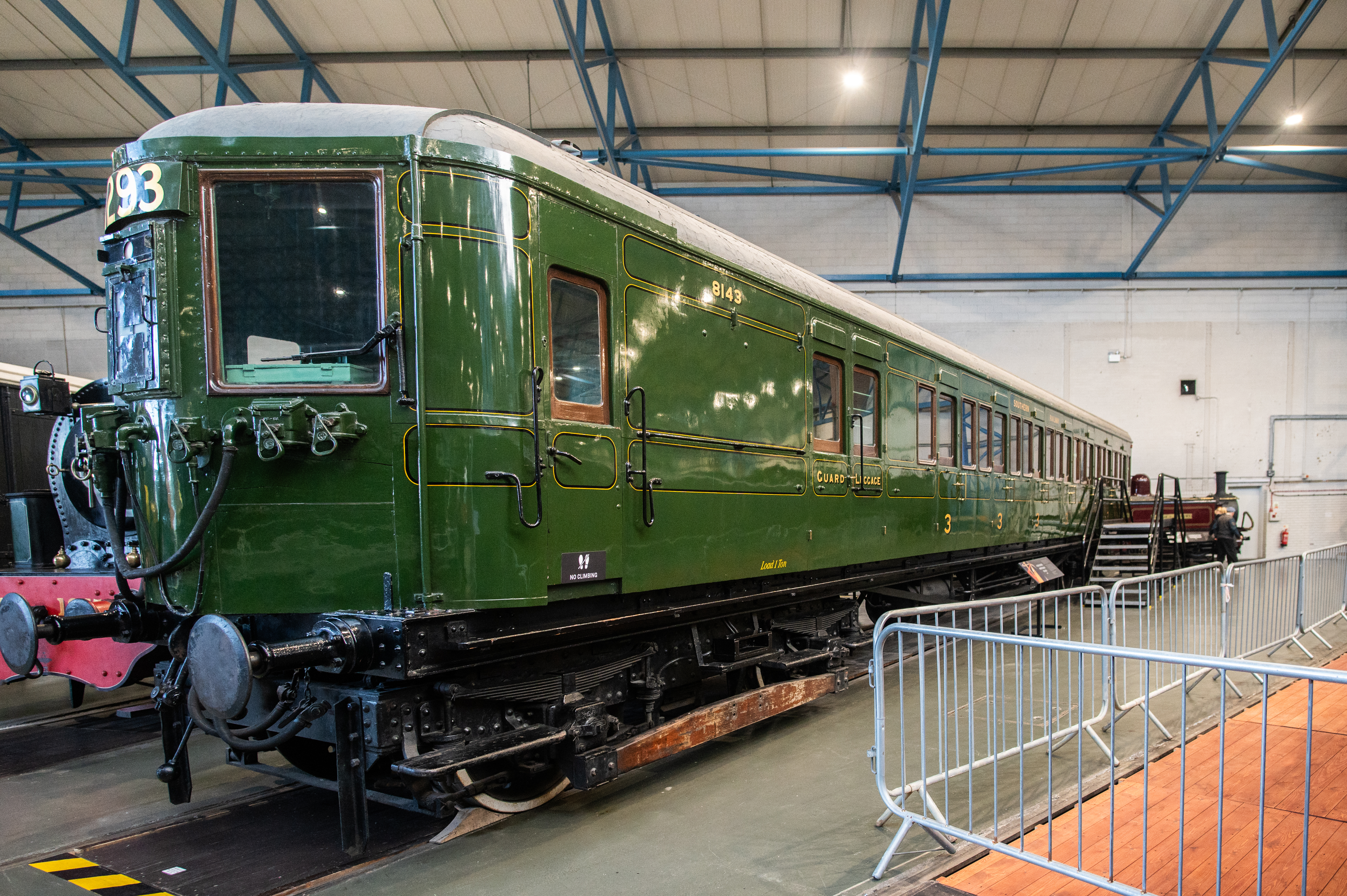
A motor carriage from unit 1293 is preserved.

Eighty-four electric multiple units, numbered E1–E84, were constructed in 1913 by converting steam-hauled carriages which had been built from 1904 for suburban service. The conversions being carried out at Eastleigh Works. Each multiple unit comprised two motor coaches and a trailer. The units were either 157 feet 5 inches (47.98 m) or 159 feet 5 inches (48.59 m) long, depending on whether a 49-foot (14.94 m) or 51-foot (15.54 m) trailer was included. The units weighed 95 tons. They seated between 172 and 190 people in first and third class. These were the first trains on the LSWR not to offer second class accommodation. Electrical equipment was by the British Westinghouse Company, each motor carriage had two 275 horsepower (205 kW) electric motors. In 1914, 24 two-coach trailer units were constructed at Eastleigh to work with the multiple units. Each comprised an eight-compartment and a nine-compartment carriage. The trailer sets were either 105 feet (32.00 m) or 107 feet (32.61 m) long and weighed 46 tons. They were third class only. The SR renumbered the electric multiple units 1201-84 and the trailer sets 1001-24.

In 1933, eight units were transferred to Brighton to work local services to Worthing. First class accommodation was reduced to 24, whilst third class was increased to 160. These units returned to London in 1934 and regained their original configuration on the introduction of the 2NOL units. In 1934, some of these units were rebuilt. The motor carriages were given new underframes and lengthened. New motor and unpowered bogies supplied. As rebuilt, they were 193 feet 8 inches (59.03 m)long. They seated 56 first class and 180 third class passengers. Weights varied between 109 and 114 tons.

=== SR electric multiple units and trailer sets ===
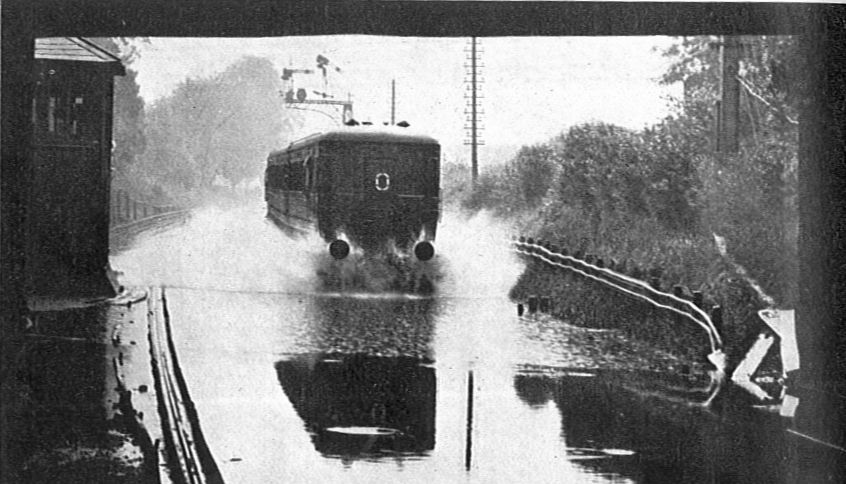
One of the SR units tackles a flood at Kew Bridge station.

These units were built by the SR. Most of the units and trailer sets were converted from steam-hauled carriages.

Sets 989-1000

Two-coach trailer sets converted in 1937-38. One carriage was a ten compartment ex-LSWR carriage. Each set was 121 feet 5 inches (37.01 m) long and weighed 51 tons. A total of 51 suburban electric vehicles were destroyed by enemy action during WWII.

Sets 1025-37

Two-coach trailer sets converted in 1925 from ex-LBSC nine-compartment bogie third carriages. Used with units 1285-1310. Each set was 115 feet 2 inches (35.10 m) long and weighed 50 tons. They seated 180 third class passengers.

Sets 1038-1050

Two-coach trailer sets converted in 1934.

Sets 1051-1120

Two-coach trailer sets converted in 1925 from ex-LBSC nine-compartment bogie third carriages. Used with units 1401-95 and 1525-34. Each set was 115 feet 2 inches (35.10 m) long and weighed 50 tons. They seated 180 third class passengers.

Sets 1121-67

Two-coach trailer sets converted in 1928 for use on Eastern Section services. Each set comprised an ex-LSWR eleven compartment carriage and an ex-SECR eight compartment carriage. Each set was 113 feet 8 inches (34.65 m) long and weighed 49 tons. They seated 190 third class passengers.

Sets 1168-80, 1187

Two-coach trailer sets converted in 1928 from ex-LBSC carriages, incorporating underframes from ex-CP motor carriages. Each set was 115 feet 2 inches (35.10 m) long and weighed 50 tons. They seated 190 third class passengers.

Sets 1181-86

Two-coach trailer sets converted in 1929-30 from ex-LBSC carriages. Each set was 113 feet 8 inches (34.65 m) long and weighed 49 tons.

Sets 1188-94

Two-coach trailer sets converted in 1934.

Sets 1195-1198

Two-coach trailer sets converted in 1934 from ex-LSWR carriages. Each set was 129 feet 4 inches (39.42 m) long and weighed 54 tons. They seated 190 third class passengers.

Sets 1199-1200

Two-coach trailer sets converted in 1937-38. One carriage was a ten compartment ex-LSWR carriage. Each set was 121 feet 5 inches (37.01 m) long and weighed 51 tons.

Units 1285-1310

Three-coach units built new in 1925 for Waterloo to Guildford via Cobham services. The motor carriages were built by the Metropolitan Carriage Wagon & Finance Co. Ltd. and the trailers were built by the Birmingham Railway Carriage and Wagon Co. Ltd. All vehicles had steel panels on a teak frame. Electrical equipment was by Metropolitan Vickers Electrical Co Ltd. Each unit was 181 feet 8 inches (55.37 m) long and weighed 105 tons. They seated 28 first and 120 third class passengers.

Units 1401-95 and 1525–34

Three-coach units converted from ex-SECR four- and six-wheel carriages at Ashford Works and Brighton Works. Electric motors were by Dick, Kerr & Co. Ltd., rated at 300 horsepower (220 kW). Each unit was 193 feet 8 inches (59.03 m) long and weighed 108 tons. They seated 56 first and 180 third class passengers.

Units 1496-1524

Three-coach units built new for use on Eastern Section services. The motor carriages were built by the Metropolitan Carriage Wagon & Finance Co. Ltd. and the trailers were built by the Birmingham Railway Carriage and Wagon Co. Ltd. All vehicles had steel panels on a teak frame. Electric motors were by Dick, Kerr & Co. Ltd., rated at 300 horsepower (220 kW). Each unit was 193 feet 8 inches (59.03 m) long and weighed 109 tons. They seated 56 first and 180 third class passengers.

Units 1579-84

Three-coach units converted in 1937 from ex-LSWR bogie carriages. Electrical equipment was by Metropolitan Vickers Electrical Co Ltd., motors were rated at 275 horsepower (205 kW). Fitted with electro-pneumatic control gear. Each unit was 193 feet 8 inches (59.03 m) long and weighed 112 tons.

Units 1593-99

Three-coach units converted in 1934-35 from ex-LSWR bogie carriages. Each unit was 193 feet 8 inches (59.03 m) long and weighed 109 tons.

Units 1601-30

Three-coach units converted in 1928 from ex-SECR bogie carriages. Electrical equipment was by Metropolitan Vickers Electrical Co Ltd., motors were rated at 275 horsepower (205 kW). Each unit was 193 feet 8 inches (59.03 m) long and weighed 108 tons. They seated 56 first and 180 third class passengers.

Units 1631-57

Three-coach units converted in 1928 from ex-LBSC bogie carriages. Electrical equipment was by Metropolitan Vickers Electrical Co Ltd., motors were rated at 275 horsepower (205 kW). Each unit was 193 feet 8 inches (59.03 m) long and weighed 104 tons.

Units 1658-1701

Three-coach units converted in 1928 from ex-LSWR bogie carriages. Each unit was 193 feet 8 inches (59.03 m) long and weighed 108 tons. Electrical equipment was by Metropolitan Vickers Electrical Co Ltd., motors were rated at 275 horsepower (205 kW). They seated 56 first and 180 third class passengers.

Units 1702-72

Three-coach units converted in 1928 from ex-LBSC bogie carriages. Units 1717-70 were converted from the overhead electric units formerly used on the ex-LBSC lines. Each unit was 193 feet 5 inches (58.95 m) long and weighed 104 tons. Electrical equipment was by Metropolitan Vickers Electrical Co Ltd., motors were rated at 275 horsepower (205 kW).

Units 1773-85

Three-coach units converted in 1930 from ex-LSWR bogie carriages. Each unit was 193 feet 8 inches (59.03 m) long and weighed 110 tons. Electrical equipment was by Metropolitan Vickers Electrical Co Ltd., motors were rated at 275 horsepower (205 kW). They seated 56 first and 180 third class passengers.

Units 1786-96

Three-coach units converted in 1928 from ex-LSWR six-wheel carriages. Each unit was 193 feet 8 inches (59.03 m) long and weighed 110 tons. Electrical equipment was by Metropolitan Vickers Electrical Co Ltd., motors were rated at 275 horsepower (205 kW). They seated 56 first and 180 third class passengers.

Units 1797-1801

Three-coach units converted in 1930 from ex-LBSC bogie carriages. Electrical equipment was by Metropolitan Vickers Electrical Co Ltd., motors were rated at 275 horsepower (205 kW). Each unit was 193 feet 8 inches (59.03 m) long and weighed 104 tons. Unit 1801 was renumbered 1600 in April 1934.

Units 1901-08

Units 1909-12

== Class 4-SUB ==
From 1942, units 1201-84, the LSWR-built units, gained an additional ex-LSWR trailer of ten or eleven compartments. Those that gained a ten compartment carriage were renumbered 4131-71. They were 256 feet 9 inches (78.26 m) long, weighed 139 tons and seated 353 people. Those that gained an eleven compartment carriage were renumbered 4195-4234. They were 257 feet 5 inches (78.46 m) long, weighed 139 tons and seated 350 people. In 1945, units 1285-1310 each gained a new ten compartment trailer and were renumbered 4300-25. They were 245 feet 0 inches (74.68 m) long, weighed 133 tons and seated 350 people. In 1945-46, units 1496-1524 each gained a new ten compartment trailer and were renumbered 4326-54. They were 257 feet 5 inches (78.46 m) long, weighed 137 tons and seated 370 people. All other three car units also gained a new trailer between 1946 and 1948. They were renumbered 4401-4594, 4601-08, and 4613-14. Weights varied between 132 and 140 tons and they could seat between 358 and 370 people. Units 4111-30 and 4364-76 were built new in 1946-47. British Railways built further batches; 4277-99 in 1948-49, 4621-59 in 1949, 4653-4709 in 1950 and 4710-54 in 1951.

== Departmental service ==
Unit 1782, which became unit 4579 when reformed as a 4-SUB, was withdrawn from passenger service in 1956. It reverted to three carriages and entered departmental service as an instruction unit, numbered S10S. One carriage was converted to provide lecture and projection facilities. Later renumbered 053, the unit was withdrawn in December 1975.

== Accidents and incidents ==
- On 9 July 1928, unit 1702 was severely damaged in a sidelong collision with B2X class locomotive No. B210 at London Bridge after the driver of B210 misread signals. Two people were killed and nine were injured, six seriously.
- On 19 September 1928, a train formed of unit 1679, trailer set 1111, and unit 1485 ran into the buffers at Charing Cross, injuring 68 passengers, 45 of whom were treated at Charing Cross Hospital.
- On 19 April 1934, unit 1790 was run into at London Bridge, severely damaging a motor coach. A replacement was converted from an ex-LSWR carriage.

- On 2 April 1937, units 1473 and 1615 were amongst those involved in a rear-end collision at Battersea Park due to misuse of the Sykes Lock and Block by a signalman. Ten people were killed and 80 were injured. A motor carriage in each unit was written off. Replacements were converted from ex-LSWR carriages.
- On 13 August 1937, an accident at Epsom Downs damaged trailer set 1152. Its ex-SECR carriage was consequently replaced by an ex-LBSC nine compartment carriage.
- On 4 November 1942 two trains formed of suburban electric stock were involved in a collision at Waddon due to misuse of the Sykes Lock and Block by the signalman. Two people were killed and at least one was injured.

- On 24 October 1947, two electric multiple unit trains were involved in a rear-end collision at South Croydon due to misuse of the Sykes Lock and Block by the signalman. The first train was of mainline stock, which was run into by a train formed of two three-car units. A total of 32 people were killed and 183 were injured.

=== Wartime losses ===
Fifty-one suburban electric carriages were destroyed by enemy action during WWII. Incidents where vehicles were destroyed or severely damaged include:

1940

- On 16 August, a bomb near Hampton Wick severely damaged two carriages, with eleven others also being damaged. Units involved were 1131, 1145, 1237, 1476 and 1516-17.
- On 8 September 1940, an incendiary bomb at Victoria destroyed three carriages and damaged two others from units 1129 and 1448. Eleven carriages were damaged at Wimbledon Carriage Sidings, including those from units 1115, 1226, 1413, 1474 and 1707. An incendiary bomb at Peckham Rye caused the destruction of two carriages and damage to three more from units 1454 and 1802.
- On 19 September, a trailer set was destroyed at Charing Cross.
- On 14 October, the carriage sheds at Selhurst were bombed. Six vehicles were destroyed, two severely damaged and ten others were also damaged. Units affected include 1009, 1044, 1139, 1170, 1184, 1259, 1426 and 1785.
- On 18 October, unit 1283 was bombed at Selsdon. One vehicle was destroyed, another severely damaged.
- On 19 October, a train was bombed at Durnsford Road, Wimbledon, destroying one carriage, severely damaging another and causing damage to the other six. Units involved were 1439 and 1530, the identity of the trailer set is unknown.
- On 25 October, the carriage sheds at Orpington were bombed. Three vehicles were destroyed. Units involved included 1473, 1501 and 1745.
- On 30 October, an incendiary bomb damaged three units at Selhurst Depot, destroying one carriage and damaging the other eight. Units involved were 1259, 1414 and 1618.
- On 4 November, a bomb brought down the footbridge at Chelsfield onto a suburban train. Two carriages were severely damaged.

1941

- On 17 April, incendiary bombs dropped at Charing Cross set four train on fire, destroying four carriages and severely damaging two others. Units involved included 1612 and 1722.
- On 25 April, a bomb at Lancing Works destroyed one carriage and severely damaged the other two of Unit 1305.
- On 11 May, a bomb at Elmers End destroyed one carriage and severely damaged the other two of unit 1799.

1942

- On 30 September, two carriages were severely damaged and sixteen others were also damaged at Lancing Works. Units involved included 1256, 1485, 1507 and 1776.

1944

- On 4 February, two carriages were destroyed and 34 damaged at Slades Green. Units involved included 1006, 1139, 1168, 1230, 1251, 1286, 1433, 1484, 1502, 1621. 1683, 1729, 1741 and 1788.
- On 24 February, a train was bombed at Loco Jn, Vauxhall. One carriage was destroyed, four severely damaged and the other three were damaged. Units involved were 1061, 1702 and 1784.
- On 17 June, a fragmentation bomb severely damaged three vehicles at East Croydon. Five other vehicles were also damaged. Units involved included 1509 and 1740.
- On 18 June, a fragmentation bomb at Charing Cross severely damaged one vehicle and damaged six others. Units involved were 1104, 1293 and 1746.
- On 23 June, a fragmentation bomb at West Croydon destroyed one carriage, severely damaged a second and damaged 28 others. Units involved included 126, 1031, 1065, 1180, 1434, 1527, 1529, 1621, 1628, 1640,1679, 1704 and 1799.
- On 30 June, a fragmentation bomb destroyed three carriages and damaged five others at Wimbledon Park Sidings. Units involved included 1598 and 1692.
- On 4 July, fragmentation bombs severely damaged two carriages and damaged 74 others at Wimbledon Park Sidings. Amongst the units involved were 1278 and 1496.
- On 7 July, fragmentation bombs severely damaged 22 carriages and damaged nineteen others at New Cross Gate. Eight trailer sets and four suburban units were amongst the casualties.
- On 14 July, a fragmentation bomb severely damaged three carriages and damaged eleven others at Selhurst. Units affected were 1079, 1186, 1413, 1629, 1715 and 1733.
- On 26 October, a fragmentation bomb destroyed three carriages, severely damaged five and slightly damaged five more near South Bermondsey. Units involved were 1023, 1267, 1268 and 1793.
- On 1 November, a V-2 rocket severely damaged two carriages and damaged eighteen others near Brockley. Units involved included 1193, 1466 and 1668.
- On 25 November, two carriages of unit 1138 were wrecked by a V-2 rocket at New Cross Gate.

1945

- On 6 January, two carriages were destroyed, seven were severely damaged and eleven others were damaged by a V-2 rocket at Peckham Rye. Units involved included 1065, 1109, 1427 and 1428.

== Sources ==
- Dendy Marshall, C. F.; Kidner, R. W. (1963) [1937]. A History of the Southern Railway. Vol. One. Ian Allan.
- Earnshaw, Alan (1991). Trains in Trouble: Vol. 7. Penryn: Atlantic Books. ISBN 0-906899-50-8.
- Glover, John (2001). Southern Electric. Ian Allan. ISBN 0-7110-2807-9.
- Marsden, Colin J. (1983). Southern Electric Multiple Units; 1898 - 1948. Ian Allan. ISBN 0-7110-1253-9.
- Moody, G. T. (1979) [1957]. Southern Electric 1909-1979 (Fifth ed.). Shepperton: Ian Allan Ltd. ISBN 0-7110-0924-4.
- Nock, O. S. (1983) [1966]. Historic Railway Disasters (Third ed.). Shepperton: Ian Allan Ltd. ISBN 0-7110-0109-X.
- Robertson, Kevin (2010). Wartime Southern Part 2. Corhampton: Noodle Books. ISBN 978-1-906419-37-0.
- Trevena, Arthur (1981). Trains in Trouble: Vol. 2. Redruth: Atlantic Books. ISBN 0-906899-03-6.
- Welch, Michael (2003). A Southern Electric Album. Harrow Weald: Capital Transport. ISBN 1-85414-270-4.
