= British Rail Class 201 =

British diesel-electric multiple unit trains

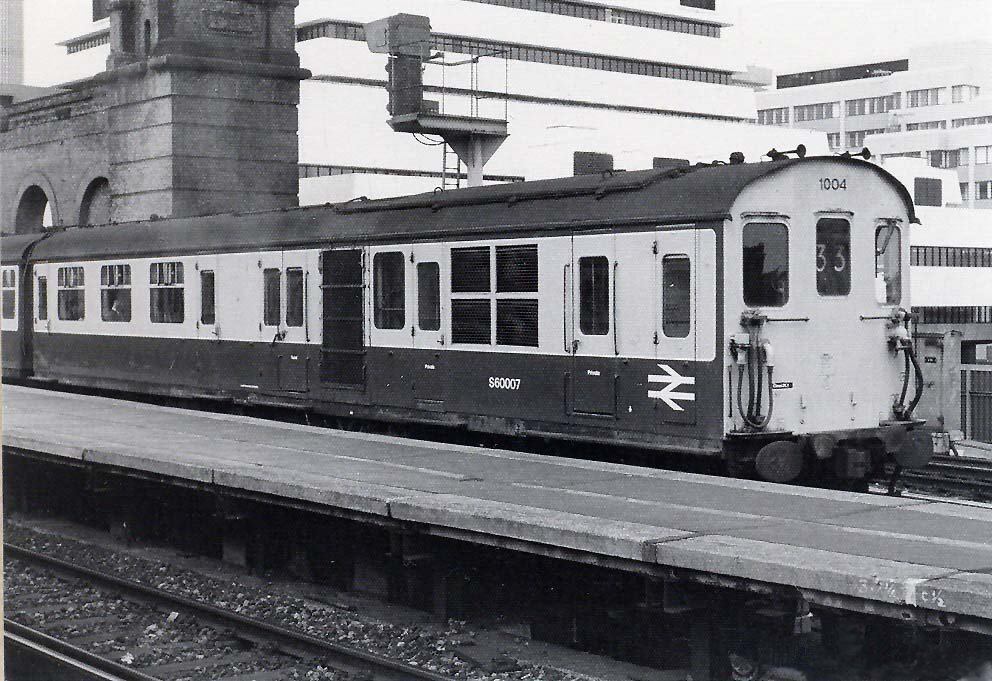
- 1004 at London Cannon Street in 1984
- In service: 1957–1986
- Manufacturer: Eastleigh and Ashford Works
- Number built: 42 vehicles (7 units)
- Number preserved: 1 unit
- Formation: DMBSO-TSOL-TSOL-TFK-TSOL-DMBSO
- Operators: Southern Region of British Railways

Specifications
- Car body construction: Steel
- Car length: 17.67 m (58 ft 0 in)
- Width: 2.74 m (9 ft 0 in)
- Height: 3.82 m (12 ft 6 in)
- Doors: Hinged slam (now centrally locked)
- Maximum speed: 75 mph (121 km/h)
- Weight: 55 long tons (56 t; 62 short tons)
- Traction system: DEMU
- Prime mover(s): English Electric 4SRKT Mark II, 2 per set
- Traction motors: English-Electric EE507 traction motors, 4 per set
- Power output: 1,000 hp (750 kW)
- Bogies: BR Standard. ExEMU coaches Commonwealth or B5
- Braking system(s): Air/EP
- Coupling system: Drop-head buck-eye
- Multiple working: with Classes 201 to 207
- Track gauge: 1,435 mm (4 ft 8 1/2 in) standard gauge

The British Rail Class 201 (or 6S) six-car diesel-electric multiple units (DEMUs) were built in 1957–1958 at Eastleigh and underframes were built at Ashford.

The Southern Region Class 201-207 DEMUs are nicknamed 'Thumpers' due to the noise they made while in motion, owing to the four cylinder engines.

These units were built for the London-Hastings line, with a narrow body profile to accommodate the restricted tunnel loading gauge on that line.

== Technical details ==
Power car (two per six-car set)

- Introduced: 1957
- Weight: 55 long tons (56 t; 62 short tons)
- Engine: English Electric 4-cylinder type 4SRKT Mark II of 600 shaft horsepower (450 kW) at 850 rpm
- Transmission: Electric, two English Electric type EE507 traction motors rated at 186 kW (249 hp) each. (Equivalent to 1,000 bhp or 750 kW per 6-car set)
- Maximum tractive effort: 12,500 lbf (56 kN) per car; 25,000 lbf (110 kN) per unit
- Driving wheel diameter: 40 in (1,016 mm) Driving Bogie; 42 in (1,067 mm) Trailer Bogie
- Coupling code: 'Buck-Eye' Type allowing coupling to any BR(S) 20x,4xx Units
- Train heating: Electric

== Fleet details ==
Key:	Preserved	Departmental Use	Scrapped

Original 6S Units

Unit No.		DMBSO	TSOL	TSOL	TFK	TSOL	DMBSO	Withdrawn	Status
New	Old	DMBSO	TSOL	TSOL	TFK	TSOL	DMBSO	Withdrawn	Status
201001	1001	60000	60500	60501	60700	60502	60001	5/1986	Preserved
-	1002	60002	60503	60504	60701	60505	60003	5/1986	Sandite unit 1066
-	1003	60004	60506	60507	60702	60508	60005	11/1964	Disbanded, vehicles later scrapped
-	1004	60006	60509	60510	60703	60511	60007	4/1986	Scrapped
-	1005	60008	60512	60513	60704	60514	60009	4/1986	Scrapped
-	1006	60010	60515	60516	60705	60517	60011	4/1986	Scrapped
-	1007	60012	60518	60519	60706	60520	60013	4/1986	Scrapped

Departmental Units

Unit No.		DM	T	DM	Withdrawn	Status
New	Old	DM	T	DM	Withdrawn	Status
1066	1002	977376 (ex-60002)	977379 (ex-60504)	977377 (ex-60003)	1994	Scrapped (1994)

== Reformations ==
Some units were disbanded during the mid 1960s to provide stock for the Class 206 'Tadpole' Units and to reform other 'Hastings Sets' after the Hither Green rail crash. Set 1002 was later reformed to its original formation in 1979, but set 1004 was reformed with only its original power cars and some trailers from sister Class 202 and 203 Hastings Sets. Set 1003 was reformed only for the last few months of Hastings DEMU service after its power cars were used for spares, again with none of its original trailers. Set 1007 also suffered a reformation in 1969 but it remained as a full six coach set until withdrawal in 1986.

== Preservation ==
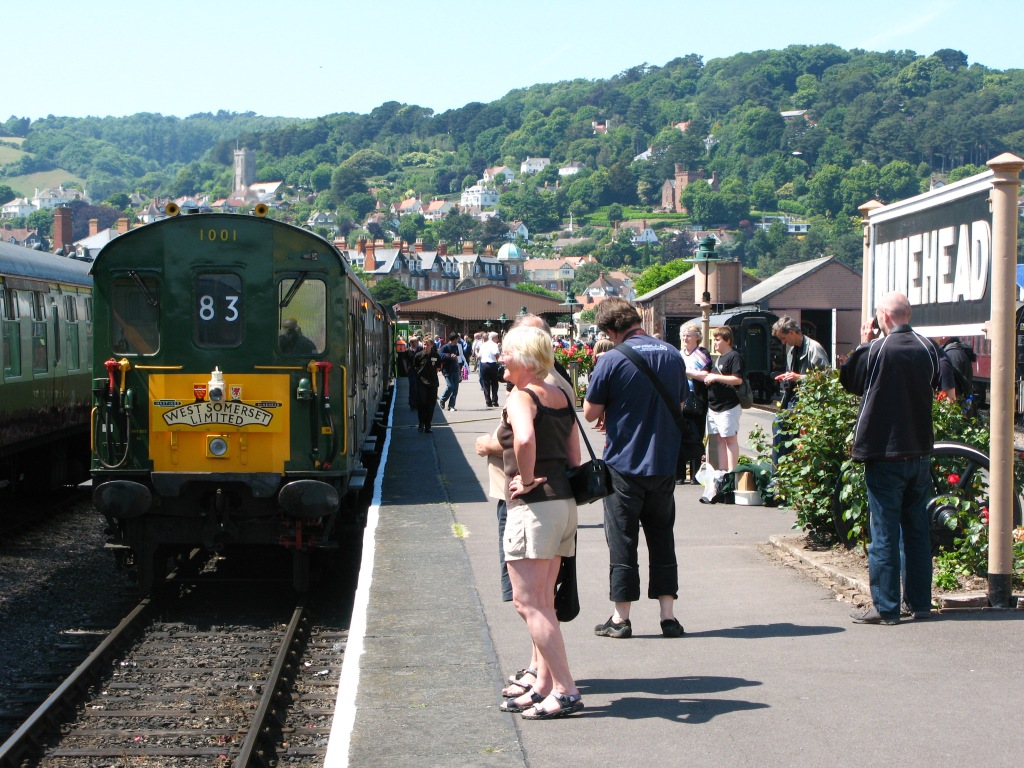
1001 at Minehead while working a railtour from Hastings

Most units were withdrawn and scrapped following electrification of the route in 1986. However, two complete units, Class 201 (6S) No. 1001 and Class 202 (6L) No. 1013, were preserved by Hastings Diesels Ltd., which is based at St Leonards-on-Sea. Vehicle no. 60000 has been named Hastings after the town which it previously worked to. This was mainline operational from the unit's revival in 1996 to 2006, but this motor coach was not prioritised when it needed fitting with Central Door Locking (CDL) & On-Train Monitoring Recorders (OTMR). 60000 also needed an overhaul to its bodywork and because of the costs involved, both financial and manpower, this work has not been carried out yet, which means it is currently in storage at St Leonards Depot. The two mainline certified motor coaches that are currently in use on the Hastings Diesel and are fitted with CDL and OTMR are 60119 (certified in 2023) and 60118 Tunbridge Wells (certified in 1996). The unit operates several mainline railtours a year, starting from Hastings and going to various destinations; mainly across the South of England, but sometimes further afield.

Additionally, the unit has been used in some unusual non-passenger workings. In July 2015, a crash-damaged Southeastern Class 375 Electrostar EMU was dragged very slowly at 5 miles per hour (8 km/h) by HDL's 2 motor coaches from Canterbury West to Ramsgate Depot using a special Dellner coupling-adapter, having collided into a herd of cattle that had strayed onto the line between Wye and Chilham. In August 2015, the 2 motor coaches spent a week at Thameslink's new depot in Three Bridges shunting some of the new-built Class 700 Desiro City trains.

Hastings Diesels Limited owns thirteen vehicles which are in various states of readiness. Two of these are part restored trailer 60527 and unrestored motor coach 60001, which formed the motive power for the original unit 1001. They have said that there will be no serious work done to 60001 until work to motor coach 60019 (60119) is completed, as this one apparently needs less work done to it, which is cheaper, and returning 60000 Hastings to front line service is also finished.

One other vehicle survives, the former buffet car 60750, the only survivor of the Hither Green crash. It was taken into BR's Research division as RDB 975386 and heavily modified to test the tilt and suspension systems for the APT-P. Previously under restoration at the Electric Railway Museum, it moved to Shackerstone on the Battlefield Line in 2017.

== See also ==
- British Rail Classes 201, 202 and 203
