= British Rail Class 206 =

Class of diesel-electric multiple unit

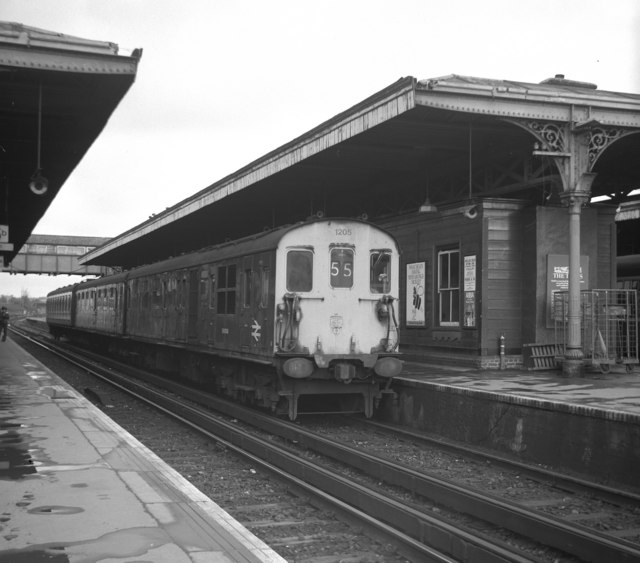
- Class 206 at Guildford in 1979
- In service: 1964-early 1990s (4 units were disbanded in 1979)
- Constructed: 1964
- Number built: 6 trainsets
- Formation: DMBS+TSL+DTS
- Operator: British Rail

Specifications
- Maximum speed: 75 mph (120 km/h)
- Weight: 54.1 long tons (55.0 t; 60.6 short tons)
- Prime mover: English Electric 4SRKT Mark II
- Power output: 600 shp (450 kW) at 850 rpm

The British Rail Class 206 or 3R was a type of Diesel-electric multiple unit (DEMU), introduced in 1964. They were not 'built' as such but rather re-formed from Class 201 and EPB vehicles for use on Reading-Redhill-Tonbridge (North Downs Line) services. Six three-car sets were created, numbered 1201-1206.

== Creation ==
By 1964, the majority of services on the Southern Region of British Railways had been converted to diesel and electric operation. However, steam locomotives continued to operate the entire service on the North Downs Line. New trains for that route could not be justified because passenger numbers were relatively low. Following service cuts on the Hastings Line, twelve carriages from Class 201 diesel-electric units were available for use, so a decision was made to combine those vehicles with six redundant driving trailers from 2-EPB electric multiple units (EMU).

Several changes were made to the vehicles before they entered service. The EPB vehicles were fitted with buckeye couplers to allow them to attach to the DEMU vehicles. A three-bay luggage area was created in the former EMU carriages to cope with the high level of mail traffic on the Reading to Tonbridge route, while the engines in the former DEMU vehicles were uprated by 100hp.

The new units were given the numbers 1201-1206, and entered service in January 1965. They were commonly referred to as 'Tadpoles' due to the difference in body profiles between the 201 and EPB stock. Following the adoption of TOPS in the late 1960s, the units were given the Class number 206.

== Operations ==
Because the Class 206 had no first class seating, their use was limited. As well as working on the North Downs Line, the units were occasionally used on the Oxted Line when other units were unavailable, and on some journeys between Reading and Basingstoke.

They were replaced by Western Region diesel multiple units from February 1979. It was intended that four of the units should be broken up into component carriages from May 1979, with 1205 and 1206 retained for other uses, but delays in the introduction of Western Region units saw 1204 survive until August and 1203 until September. From September 1979, only one unit was required for the North Downs Line, with the other used on the Marshlink Line between Hastings and Ashford.

Following a derailment at Appledore (Kent) in March 1980, 1205 and 1206 were temporarily separated to provide cover for damaged Class 201 vehicles. The separation of 1205 became permanent in November 1980. In May 1981, the last surviving unit, 1206, was replaced on the Reading to Tonbridge route by a Western Region unit, but was used between Hastings and Ashford for a further four years.

== Class 206/1 ==
In June 1986, the Class 206 number was reused for another hybrid unit. Class 205 unit 1113 was involved in a collision at Battersea Park in May 1985, causing two of its three carriages to be damaged and later scrapped. It re-entered service in April 1986 with two vehicles from a withdrawn Class 202 unit, and was re-designated as a Class 206 two months later, taking the TOPS number 206101. It operated regularly on the Marshlink Line until October 1987, when it was withdrawn.

== Technical details ==
Power car (one per three-car set)

- Weight: 54 long tons 2 cwt (121,200 lb or 55 t)
- Transmission: Electric, two English Electric traction motors
- Train heating: Electric
