= British Rail Class 210 =

Diesel-electric multiple unit

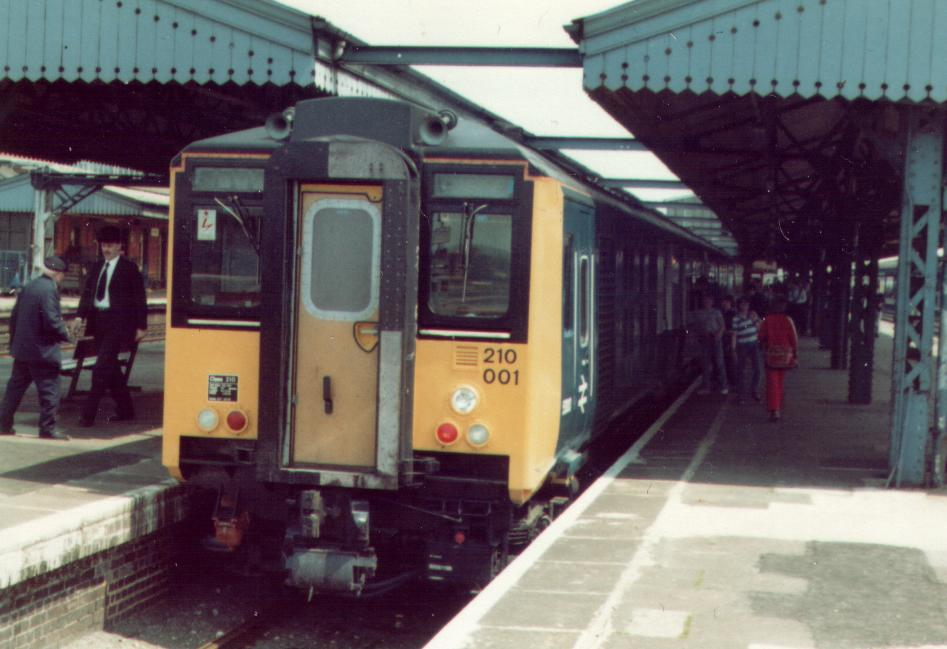
- 210001 at Reading in 1982
- In service: 1982–1987
- Manufacturer: British Rail Engineering Limited
- Built at: Derby Litchurch Lane Works
- Family name: BR Second Generation (Mark 3)
- Constructed: 1980
- Number built: 2
- Number scrapped: 2
- Formation: Unit 210001: 4 cars (DMBSO-TSO-TCO-DTSO); Unit 210002: 3 cars (DMSO-TSO-DTSO)
- Diagram: DMSO vehicle: DA201; DMBSO vehicle: DB206; TSO vehicles: DH205; TCO vehicle: DH302; DTSO vehicles: DE203
- Fleet numbers: 210001–210002
- Capacity: Unit 210001: 254 seats (22 first-class, 232 standard); Unit 210002: 203 seats (all standard-class)
- Operator: British Rail

Specifications
- Car body construction: Steel
- Train length: Unit 210001: 80.72 m (264 ft 10 in); Unit 210002: 60.54 m (198 ft 7 in)
- Car length: DM and DT vehicles: 19.830 m (65 ft 0.7 in); Intermediate vehicles: 19.920 m (65 ft 4.3 in)
- Width: 2.816 m (9 ft 2.9 in)
- Height: 3.774 m (12 ft 4.6 in)
- Floor height: 1.144 m (3 ft 9.0 in)
- Doors: Double-leaf pocket sliding, each 1.010 m (3 ft 3.8 in) wide
- Wheelbase: Over bogie centres: 14.170 m (46 ft 5.9 in)
- Maximum speed: 90 mph (140 km/h)
- Weight: DMSO & DMBSO vehicles: 62.0 t (61.0 LT; 68.3 ST); TSO & TCO vehicles: 26.5 t (26.1 LT; 29.2 ST); DTSO vehicles: 29.0 t (28.5 LT; 32.0 ST)
- Prime movers: Unit 210001: 1 × Paxman 6RP200 inline-6 4-stroke turbo-diesel, rated for 839 kW (1,125 hp); Unit 210002: 1 × MTU 12V396 TC12 V12 4-stroke turbo-diesel, rated for 850 kW (1,140 hp)
- Traction motors: 4 × axle-hung DC; Unit 210001: Brush; Unit 210002: GEC
- Power output: 746 kW (1,000 hp)
- Tractive effort: 92 kN (21,000 lb_{f}) maximum
- Acceleration: Unit 210001: 0.55 m/s^{2} (1.8 ft/s^{2}); Unit 210002: 0.70 m/s^{2} (2.3 ft/s^{2})
- UIC classification: Unit 210001: Bo′Bo′+2′2′+2′2′+2′2′; Unit 210002: Bo′Bo′+2′2′+2′2′
- Bogies: Powered: BREL BP20; Unpowered: BREL BT13
- Minimum turning radius: 70.4 m (231 ft 0 in)
- Braking system: Electro-pneumatic (disc)
- Safety system: AWS
- Coupling system: Tightlock
- Track gauge: 1,435 mm (4 ft 8 1/2 in) standard gauge

Notes/references
- Specifications as at August 1982 unless otherwise specified.

The British Rail Class 210 was a type of diesel-electric multiple unit (DEMU) passenger train designed and constructed by British Rail Engineering Limited's Derby Litchurch Lane Works.

The Class 210 was developed during the early 1980s to be a modern replacement for the ageing 'first generation' DMUs in use on the Southern Region of British Railways, such as the Class 201 and Class 207. It was designed around a particularly ambitious set of requirements defined in a specification produced by British Rail (BR), construction of the first unit commenced during 1982. While several prototypes were built and subject to extensive testing during the 1980s, the process did not result in a production run for the type. It can be considered an alternative to, or spiritual precursor of, the highly successful Sprinter family of DMUs that were produced during the 1980s.

The pair of Class 210s that were built were only operated for a few years before being withdrawn in the 1980s. Carriages from both units were used for the experimental Class 457/Class 316; a majority of the carriages have now been scrapped.

== Background ==
By the beginning of the 1980s, British Rail (BR) operated a large fleet of first generation DMUs, which had been constructed in prior decades to various designs. While formulating its long-term strategy for this sector of its operations, British Rail planners recognised that there would be considerable costs incurred by undertaking refurbishment programmes necessary for the continued use of these ageing multiple units, particularly due to the necessity of handling and removing hazardous materials such as asbestos. In light of the high costs involved in retention, planners examined the prospects for the development and introduction of a new generation of DMUs to succeed the first generation.

In the concept stage, two separate approaches were devised, one involving a so-called railbus that prioritised the minimisation of both initial (procurement) and ongoing (maintenance & operational) costs, while the second was a more substantial DMU that could deliver superior performance than the existing fleet, particularly when it came to long-distance services. The initial specification developed for the latter type was relatively ambitious for the era, calling for a maximum speed of 90 mph (140 km/h), a rate of acceleration compatible to contemporary EMUs, the ability to couple/work in multiple with existing EMUs, facilitate through-access for passengers, feature pressure ventilation, the ability to assist another failed unit, and to comprise either a three or four-car consist. It was this specification that served as the basis for the Class 210, and as such defined many of the type's key performance attributes.

== Design ==
The Class 210 was externally very similar to the first batch of Class 317 EMUs, but half of the forward carriage was taken up by the engine room. Power was provided by an above-floor diesel engine driving a generator to power traction motors on the axles. A single engine was fitted at one end of the train, and the trains operated in a push-pull configuration. As part of the testing, each unit was fitted with a different diesel engine - the three-car unit received a 1,125 bhp (839 kW) Paxman RP type engine, while the four-car set had a 1,140 brake horsepower (850 kW) MTU TC type.

In order to deliver the performance levels that had been specified by BR, particularly in regards to maximum speed, rate of acceleration, and the desired through-passenger access, it was determined to be necessary to adopt relatively expensive equipment. The propulsion system was particularly affected; a total of four traction motors were necessary to achieve the acceleration and assistance goals; furthermore, extensive and heavy soundproofing was needed between the engine compartment and the passenger space, which proved an obstacle for maintenance tasks in this area. There were also maintainability problems in general, often due to space limitations.

The ambitious performance characteristics for the class has been attributed with not only a rise in cost but also in weight. The higher weight, in turn, incurred increased fuel consumption. The placement of engine cooling equipment also led to elevated power consumption for this subsystem. These issues, although individually relatively minor, cumulatively served to undermine the economic arguments being considered around the prospective procurement of the Class 210 by BR, and decreased the likelihood of a large production run.

Despite the identification of several shortcomings, BR officials recognised the performance of the prototype Class 210s would not be as high as a subsequent production fleet. For production, it is highly likely that numerous refinements would have been introduced, such as its assembly from more proven components, and that such a fleet would possess both a greater reliability level and lower maintenance costs. Official forecasts saw a tentative Class 210 fleet as being capable of achieving an availability rate of 85 per cent.

A total of seven individual vehicles were built, which were formed into two trains, 210 001 (four-car set) and 210 002 (three-car set). Set 210 001 was an outer-suburban version, with first- and second-class seating, toilets and a luggage van. Set 210 002 was an inner-suburban version provided with high-density second-class seating only. The vehicles were initially given numbers in the DMU range (5xxxx), (Note: DMSO vehicle 53000, DMBSO vehicle 53001, TSO vehicles 57000–570001, TCO vehicle 58000, DTSO vehicles 54000–54001.) before being renumbered into the DEMU range (6xxxx).

== Operations ==
Sets 210 001 and 210 002 operated in various parts of the country on trial (as did the prototype railbuses, both the single cars and the Class 140 set). Crew training on the Reading-Taunton line commenced in April 1982 with a press demonstration held in May, before entering service on 5 July 1982.

They operated in the London area of the Western Region: 210 001 was based at Reading TMD and operated between Paddington, Reading, Newbury and Oxford, while 210 002 was based at Southall Depot and operated between Paddington and Slough.

Testing of the Class 210 greatly influenced planners within BR. It was felt that the type had sufficiently demonstrated that a new generation of DMUs would realistically deliver a meaningful reduction in ongoing maintenance costs. While the Class 210 has shown some maintainability issues, these had lessened considerably once the initial teething stage had been passed. Planners also recognised that the role of their ambitious specification in these issues and that, in order to reduce costs and increase maintainability, a less demanding specification would need to be drawn up to get greater value out of the tentative next generation DMUs for BR.

Specifically, it was decided to drop the top speed from 90 to 75 mph (145 to 121 km/h), as testing had revealed the higher rate to deliver no perceivable improvement in journey times due to the typically short spacing of the stations the type was intended to serve. Furthermore, it was determined that a propulsion system delivering 7 hp (5.2 kW) per tonne would deliver sufficient acceleration. The requests for compatibility with other rolling stock were eliminated, although auto-coupling and auto-connecting functionality was added. With these changes, although inspired by experiences gained through operating the Class 210, the type was no longer aligned with the organisation's present requirements.

As such, the remit that the Class 210 was once intended to fulfil was instead satisfied by the Class 150 DMU, the first model of BR's Sprinter family, which, like the Class 210 (and the Class 317, Class 318 and Class 455 EMUs), were based on the Mark 3 coach bodyshell. The cars led different lives after being withdrawn. The two driving trailers (and the intermediate trailer of the three-car set together with one trailer from the four-car set) were used by Network SouthEast as part of the Class 457 Networker development train. Both the driving cars subsequently passed to the Electric Railway Museum, Warwickshire, one being resold in 2004 to the Eversholt Rail Group. There was a plan for a driving motor to be saved also but, after being stored at Eastleigh Works for many years (still in blue and grey livery), both driving motors were scrapped in May 2003.

One of the TSOs (67400, formerly 60400) was subsequently reused in Class 455 set 455 912, indirectly replacing a Class 455 trailer whose structure had been weakened by experimental doors; the other two have been scrapped. A DTSO from set 210 002 was inserted into set 455 913, in 2013, after being rebuilt at Wolverton railway works to replace a carriage destroyed in an accident. The vehicle (67301, formerly 60301) was converted to a 455 MSO. Both vehicles were scrapped in 2025.

== Technical details ==
Unit	Cars per unit	Unit length	Seat count	Engine	Engine output	Alternator
210001	4	80.72 m (264 ft 10 in)	254 (22 1st, 232 2nd)	Paxman 6RP200	839 kW (1,125 hp)	Brush BA1002A
210002	3	60.54 m (198 ft 7 in)	203 (all 2nd)	MTU 12V396 TC12	915 kW (1,227 hp)	GEC G563AZ

Individual vehicles are as follows:

Key:	Scrapped	Preserved

Unit	Vehicle			
Unit	DMBSO	TSO	TCO	DTSO
210001	60201	60401	60450	60300
210002	60200	60400	—	60301

== See also ==
- NIR Class 450 – a class of three-car DMU built to a similar configuration for Northern Ireland Railways
