= Networker (train) =

Passenger train family built for British Rail

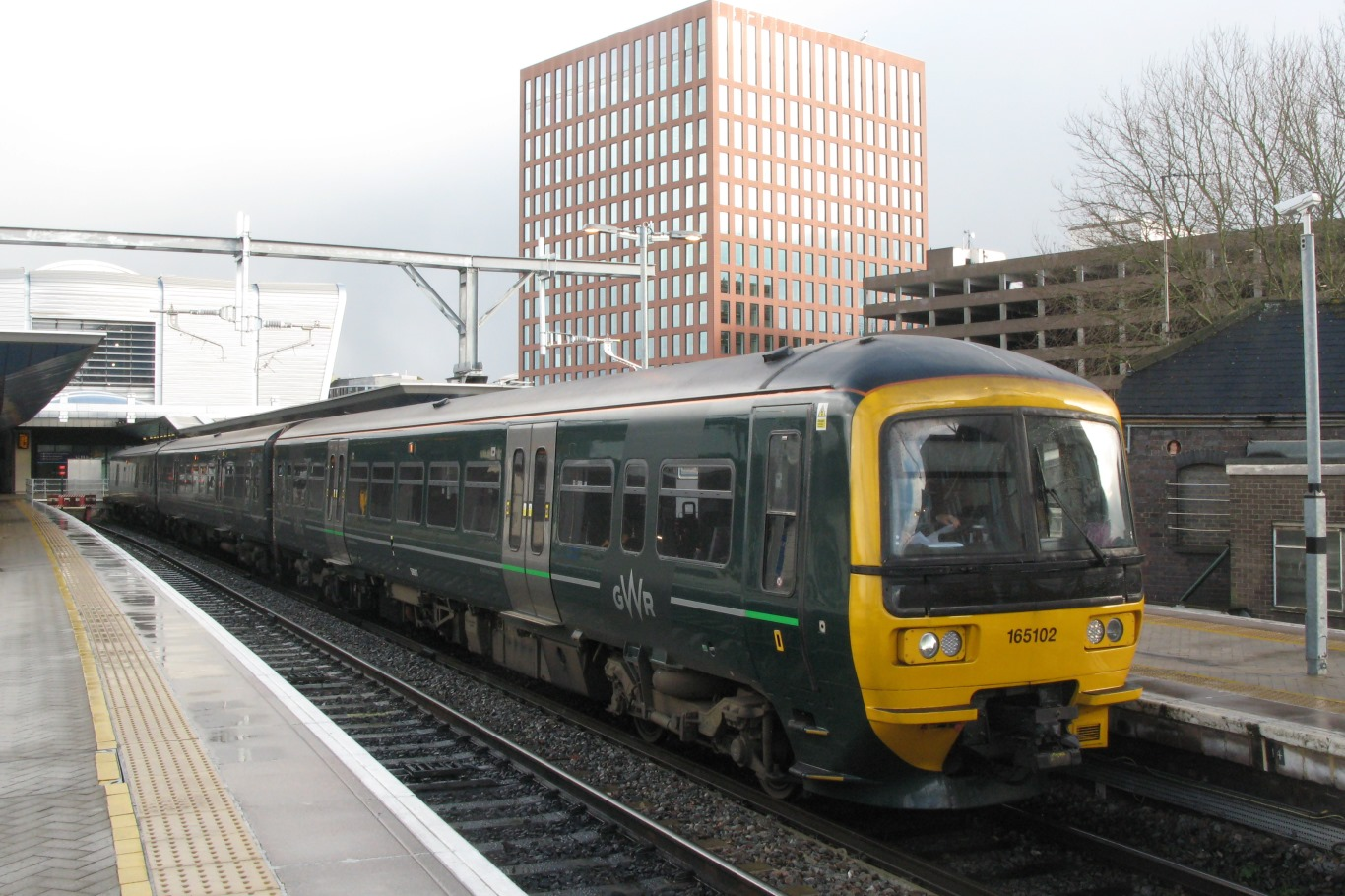
- Great Western Railway liveried Class 165 Networker at Reading
- In service: 1989–present
- Manufacturers: BREL (1980s–1992); ABB (1992–1995); Metro Cammell; GEC-Alsthom
- Number built: 344 sets
- Number scrapped: 40 sets
- Operators: Chiltern Railways; Great Western Railway; Southeastern

Specifications
- Maximum speed: 75–100 mph (121–161 km/h)
- Track gauge: 1,435 mm (4 ft 8 1/2 in) standard gauge

The Networker is a family of multiple-unit passenger trains which operate on the British railway system. They were built in the late 1980s and early 1990s by British Rail Engineering Limited (which became part of ABB in September 1992) and Metro Cammell. The trains were built for the Network SouthEast (NSE) sector of British Rail, which is where their name comes from.

== History ==
At the launch of Network SouthEast in 1986, the 'Networker' series of trains was announced. It would be a new family of trains that would be introduced as a key part of NSE's wider plan to modernise their network. Specifically, it would replace various older types of trains, typically locomotive-hauled rakes of 'slam-door' carriages.

Unlike previous contemporary rolling stock units in Britain, Networker trains would use aluminium bodies to save weight. Furthermore, electric units would feature modern AC traction motors and air conditioning. The design was to cover all requirements for future NSE multiple units, including new routes such as the Channel Tunnel Rail Link. NSE intended for fleet procurement to be performed in a rolling fashion, ordering around 300 carriages per year.

The Networker was originally intended to become one of the largest families of trains, bigger even than the largely Mark 3-based Second Generation. However, due to the recession in the early 1990s and the privatisation of British Rail from 1994, around 340 trains were built, substantially fewer than originally planned.

== Variants ==
=== Diesel multiple units ===
==== Class 165 ====
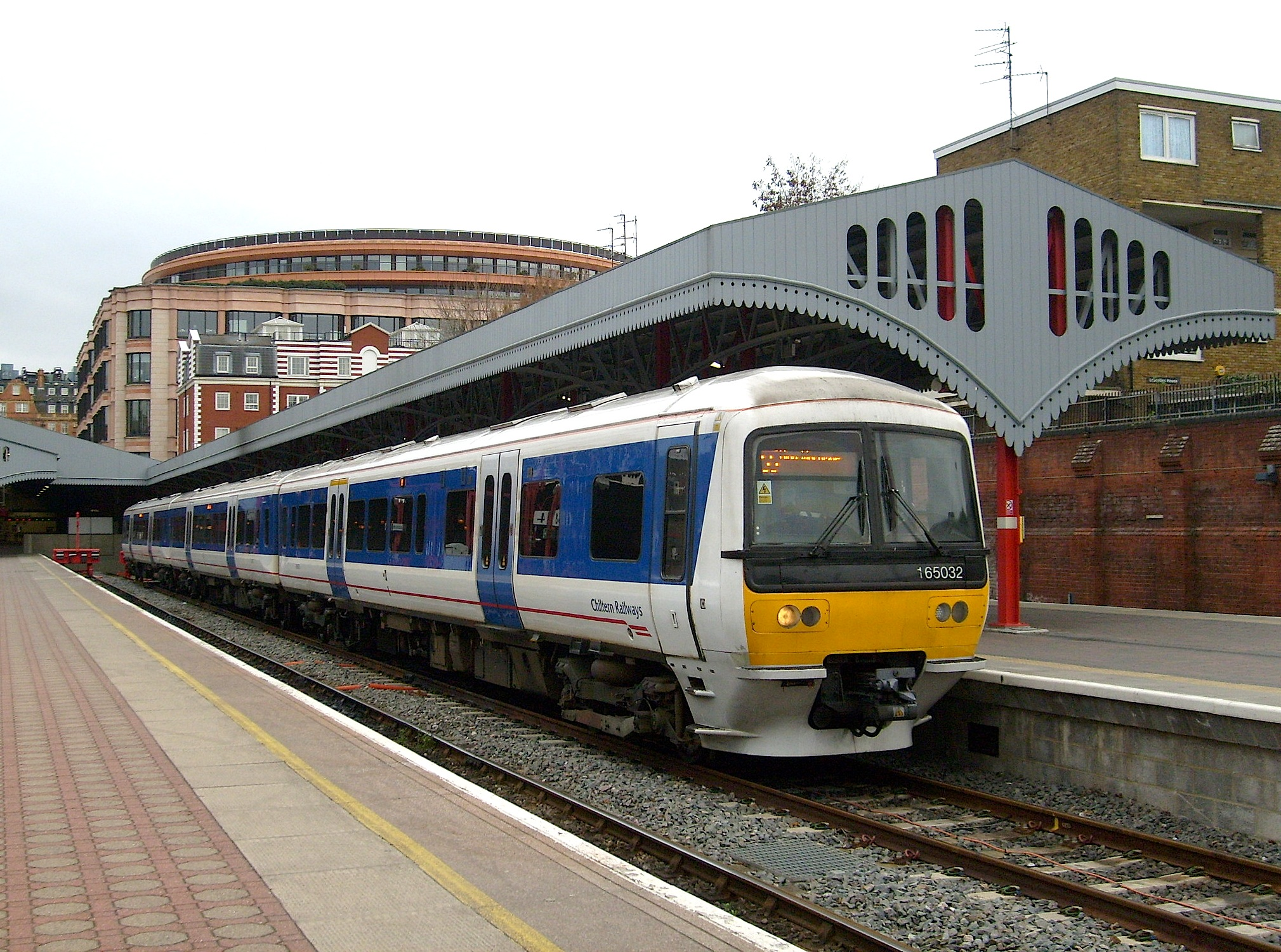
A Class 165 at London Marylebone in Chiltern Railways livery

The Class 165 is a 2- and 3-car diesel multiple unit (DMU), built for outer suburban workings. Thirty-nine units were built for the Chiltern subdivision of Network SouthEast between 1990 and 1991 (Class 165/0), while thirty-seven were made for the Thames subdivision in 1992 (Class 165/1). Since privatisation, the Class 165/0 units have been operated by Chiltern Railways, while the Class 165/1 units have been operated by Thames Trains, First Great Western Link, First Great Western and Great Western Railway in turn.

==== Class 166 ====
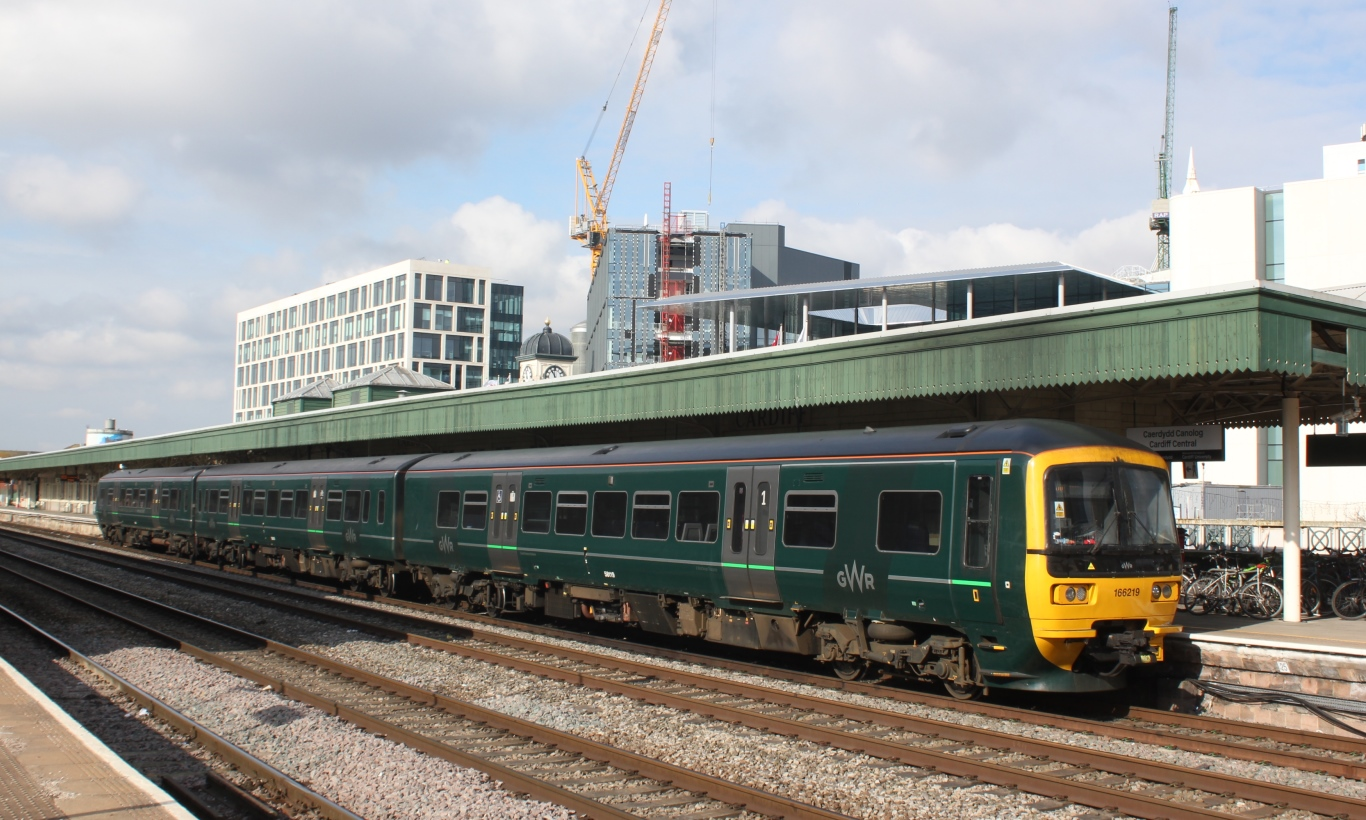
A Class 166 at Cardiff Central in Great Western Railway livery

The Class 166 is a faster, air-conditioned variant of the Class 165, built for main line workings. Twenty-one 3-car units were built for the Thames and North Downs subdivisions of Network SouthEast in 1992 and 1993.

=== Electric multiple units ===
==== Classes 316 and 457 ====
These designations applied to a single four-car electric multiple unit (EMU), converted from former Class 210 carriages, that was used as a research prototype. The unit was numbered as a Class 457 unit for trials with power from 750 V direct current (DC) third rail on Southern Region lines, then as a Class 316 unit for trials with power from 25 kV alternating current (AC) overhead line equipment on lines north of the River Thames, for which one of its intermediate carriages was replaced with a Class 313 pantograph trailer.

==== Class 365 ====
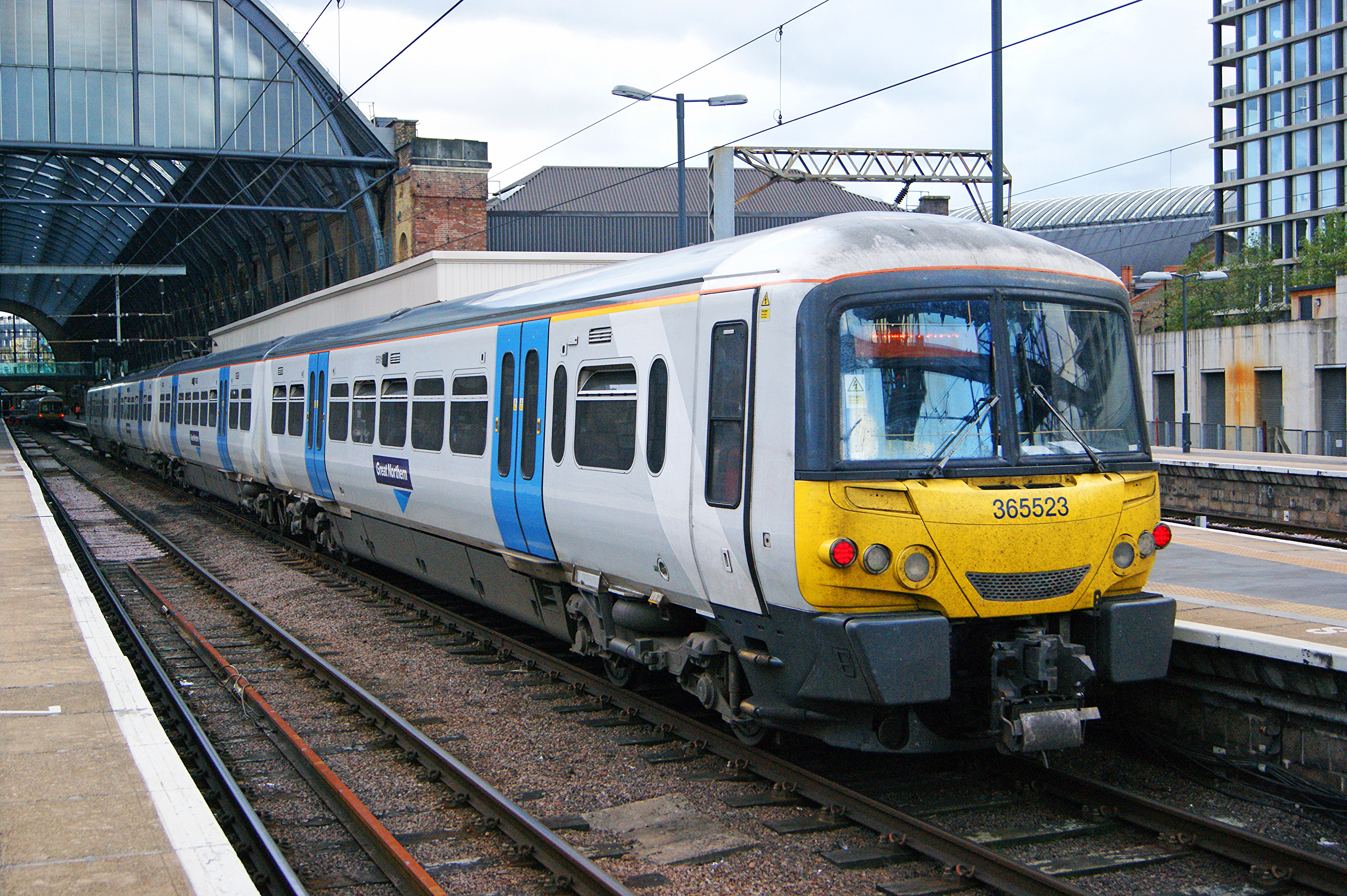
A Class 365 at London King's Cross in Great Northern livery

The Class 365 was a dual-voltage EMU. The train was ordered in 1993, following a financial battle between NSE and InterCity for investment. Forty-one 4-car units were built from 1994 to 1995, the first sixteen fitted with pick-up shoes for power from 750 V DC third rail on services between London and Kent, and the other twenty-five fitted with pantographs for power from 25 kV AC overhead line equipment on services on the East Coast Main Line from London King's Cross to Peterborough and King's Lynn. After use by a variety of operators, Great Northern withdrew its Class 365 fleet on 15 May 2021, and the fleet was subsequently scrapped.

==== Class 465 ====
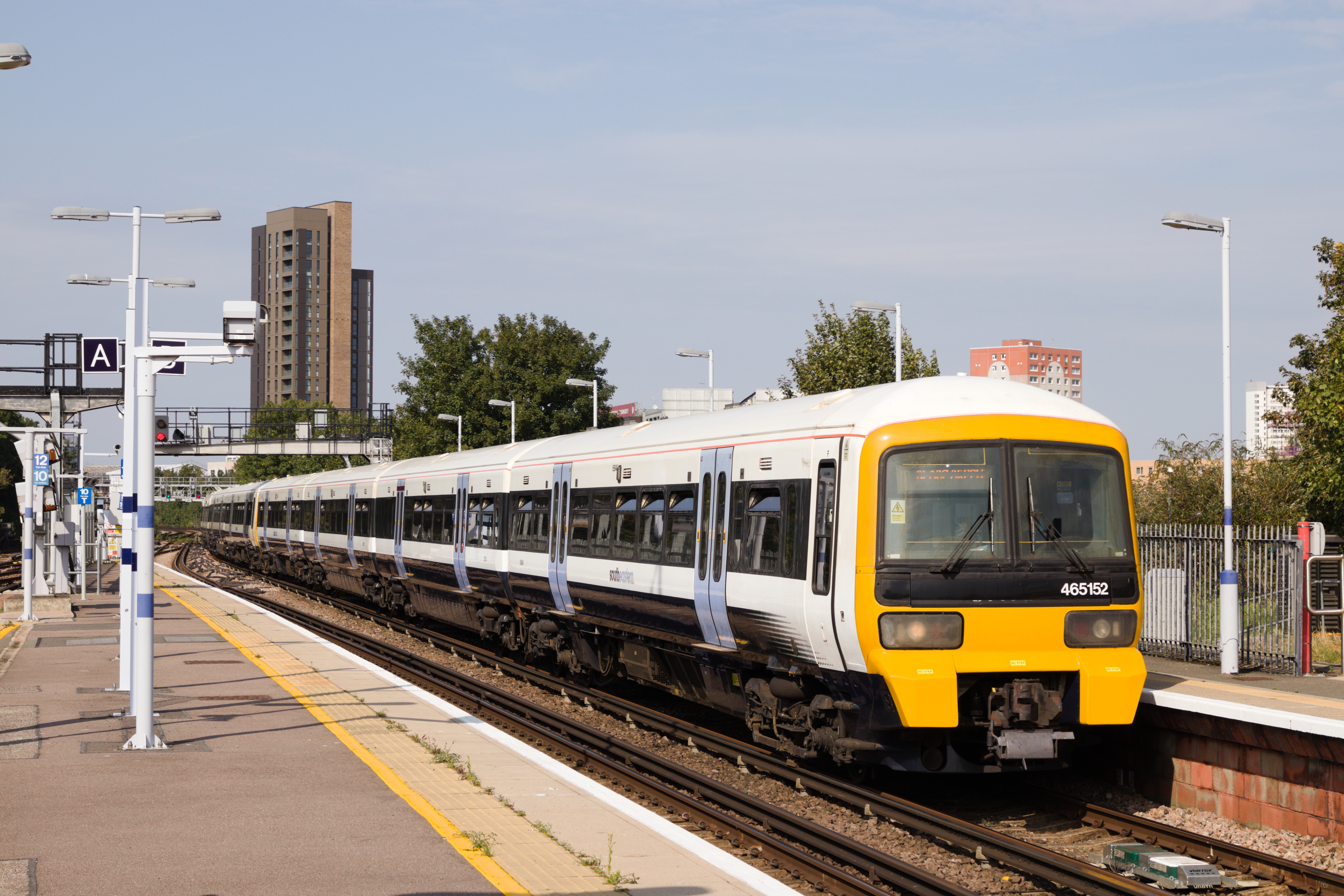
A class 465 in Southeastern livery in 2020

The Class 465 is a four-car EMU, powered from 750 V DC third rail. They were built by British Rail Engineering Limited (465/0), ABB (465/1), and Metro Cammell (465/2) in slightly different versions. Used by Network SouthEast, upon privatisation they passed to Connex South Eastern, then to South Eastern Trains then to Southeastern and are currently operated by SE Trains.

==== Class 466 ====
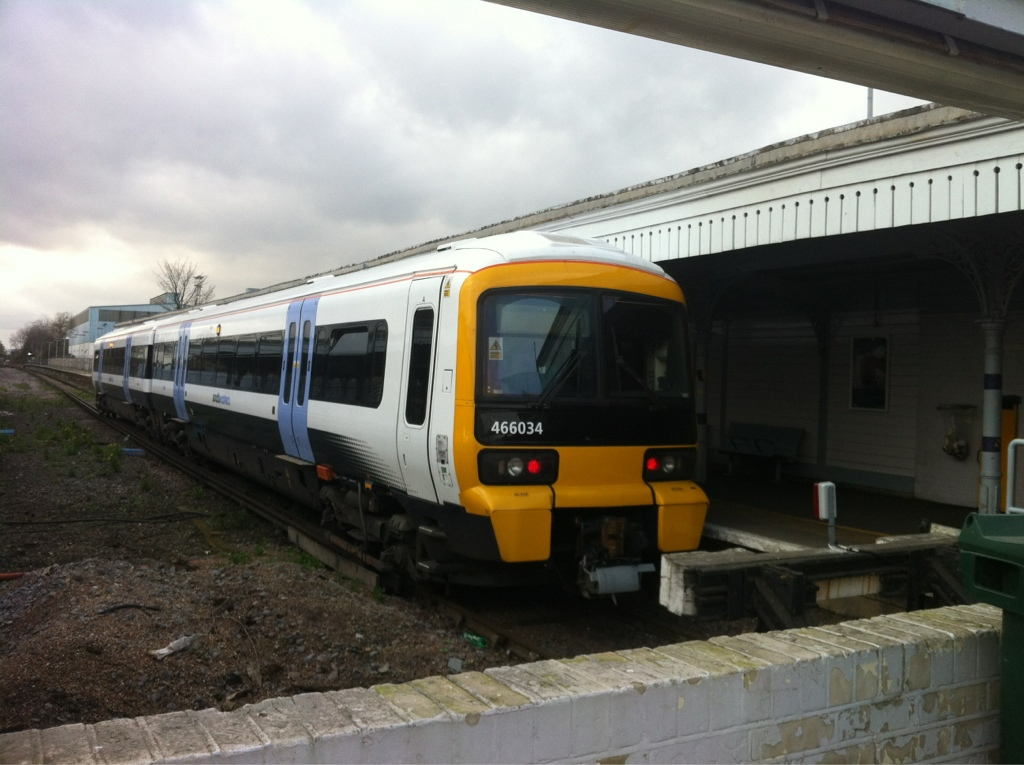
A 466 in Southeastern livery at Sheerness-on-Sea railway station in 2011

The Class 466 is a two-car EMU. It is powered from 750 V DC third rail and used extensively in multiple with 4-car 465s to provide 6-car and 10-car formations. 43 units were built between 1993 and 1994 by Metro Cammell (who built the 465/2s) using GEC traction. The arrival of Class 376 Electrostar trains saw some units move to rural lines to operate 2-car shuttles, displacing half of the Class 508s.

In early 2025, scrapping began on the stored Class 466 units.

=== Unbuilt ===
==== Class 171 ====
Class 171 was a long distance DMU that was proposed but never built. Originally, around seventy 'Turbo Express' trains were planned for long distance, unelectrified routes, such as from London Waterloo to Salisbury and Exeter St Davids. However, Regional Railways had over-ordered Class 158 trains, and NSE agreed to take on the surplus units, introducing them from 1993 as Class 159 South Western Turbos. Therefore, Class 171 trains were no longer required. The class number was later used by Southern on their Class 171 Turbostar units.

==== Class 331 and 332 ====
Class 331 and 332 were two middle distance EMU types that were proposed and never built. 300 Class 331 'Networker LT&S' carriages were planned, as part of a 'Total Route Modernisation' of the London, Tilbury and Southend line. Instead, 74 Bombardier built Class 357 Electrostar trains entered service from 2000.

Twenty Class 332 'Networker Heathrow' trains were planned to be built for Heathrow Express services. Instead, 14 CAF built Class 332 trains entered service in 1998 on Heathrow Express services.

==== Class 341 and 342 ====
Class 341 and 342 were middle distance EMU types that were proposed but never built. Class 341 'Networker Crossrail' was intended to be the rolling stock for Crossrail prior to its cancellation in the early 1990s; the specifications for this class were later used in drawing up the rolling stock specifications for the current incarnation of Crossrail. The Class 342 was intended for use on domestic services using the Channel Tunnel Rail Link when it opened in 1994. In the end, these projects were cancelled, and no trains were constructed.

==== Class 371, 381 and 471 ====
Class 371, 381 and 471 were three long distance EMU types that were proposed but never built. Classes 371 and 381 were proposed as the "Universal Networker", a dual voltage train type for a multitude of services including Kent Coast, Great Northern, Thameslink and LTS routes. Class 471 was the proposed "main line Networker" intended for long-distance services from London to Kent and Sussex. The Class 365 train was ordered in 1993, instead of the upgraded Class 471 series. Following the privatisation of British Rail from 1994, no more trains were ordered.

=== Comparison ===
Class	Image	Current operator	Introduced	Qty.	Cars	Car length
Diesel multiple units
165		Chiltern Railways	1990–1992	39	2 or 3	22 m (72 ft 2 in)
165		Great Western Railway	1992	36	2 or 3	22 m (72 ft 2 in)
166		Great Western Railway	1992–1993	21	3	22 m (72 ft 2 in)
Dual-voltage
316 and 457		(Scrapped, preserved or inserted into Class 455 units)	1989–1990	1	4	
365		(Scrapped)	1994–1995	41	4	20 m (65 ft 7 in)
DC electric only
465		Southeastern	1991–1994	147	4	20 m (65 ft 7 in)
466		Southeastern	1993–1994	43	2	20 m (65 ft 7 in)
