= State Railway of Thailand ASR class =

Thai diesel multiple unit class

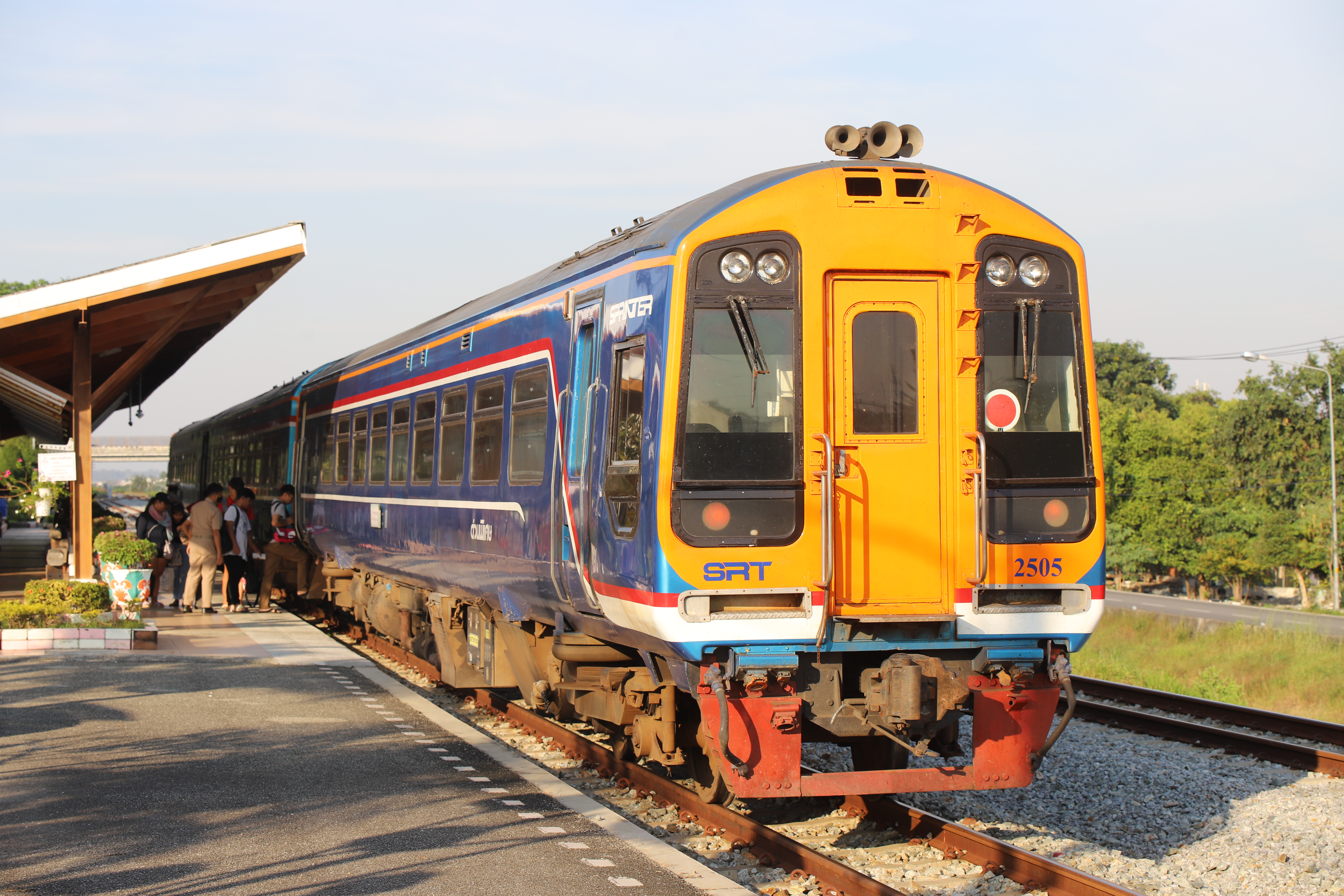
- ASR class at Pattaya station in November 2020
- Stock type: Diesel Multiple Unit
- In service: 1991 - present
- Manufacturer: British Rail Engineering Limited
- Built at: Derby Litchurch Lane Works
- Family name: Sprinter
- Entered service: 1991
- Number built: 20
- Fleet numbers: 2501-2512 (Cab car); 2113-2120 (Power car)
- Operator: State Railway of Thailand
- Lines served: Eastern; Northeastern

Specifications
- Car body construction: Aluminium alloy
- Car length: 23.21 m (76 ft 2 in)
- Width: 2.7 m (8 ft 10 in)
- Maximum speed: 120 km/h (75 mph)
- Prime mover: Cummins NT855
- Braking system: Air brake
- Coupling system: Janney
- Seating: 76
- Track gauge: 1,000 mm (3 ft 3 3/8 in)metre gauge

The State Railway of Thailand ASR class is a diesel multiple unit operated by the State Railway of Thailand (SRT). Built by British Rail Engineering Limited at Derby Litchurch Lane Works in England, it is based on the British Rail Class 158. Twenty carriages were built in 1990/91. All were painted in the same Regional Railways livery as the Class 158s. The livery was changed to a livery designed by SRT in 2011.
