= British Rail Classes 316 and 457 =

Class of prototype electric multiple unit

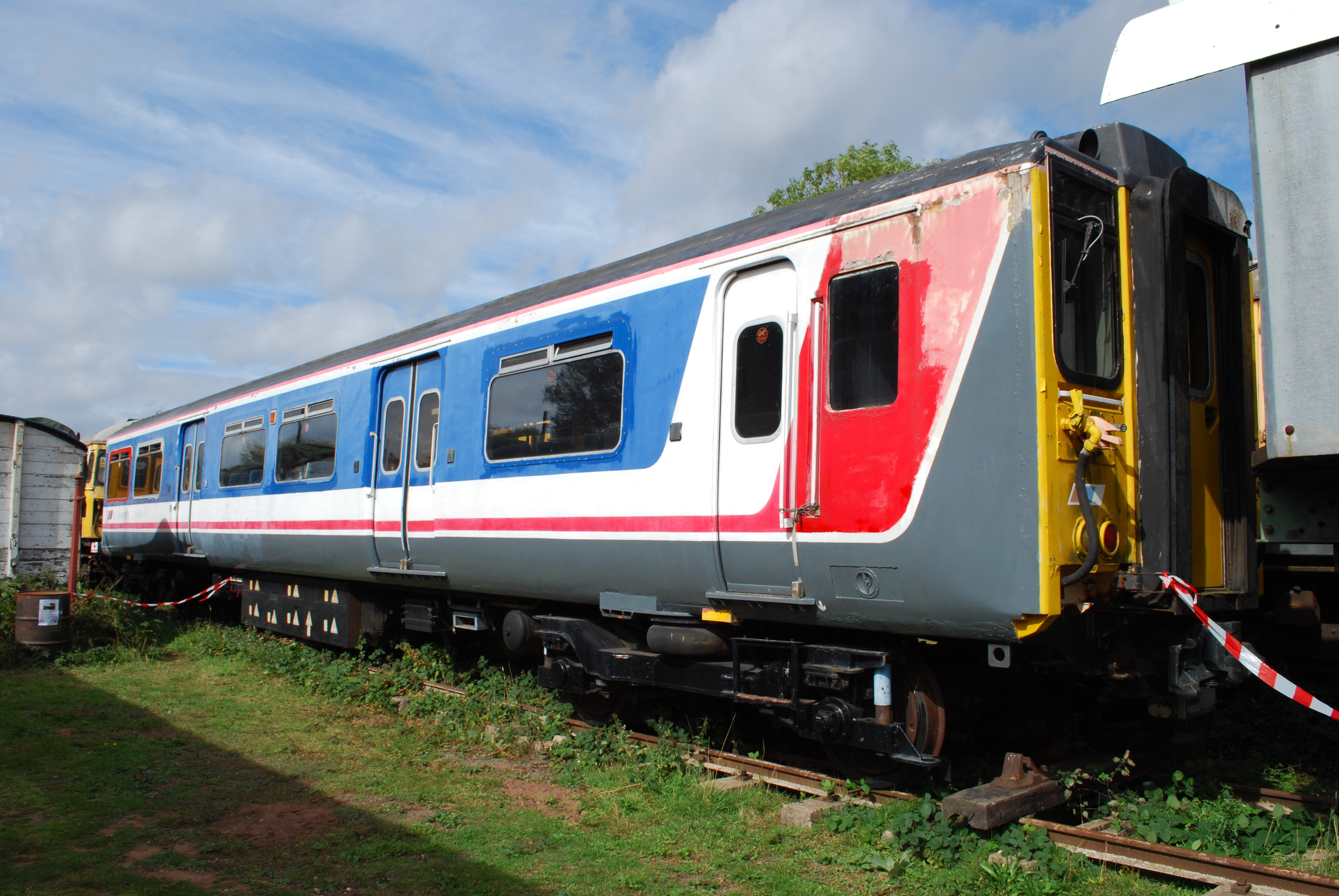
- 67300 at Electric Railway Museum, Warwickshire
- In service: 1989 (as Class 457); 1990 (as Class 316)
- Manufacturer: British Rail Engineering Limited
- Built at: Derby Litchurch Lane Works
- Family name: BR Second Generation (Mark 3)
- Number built: 1
- Formation: 4 cars
- Operator: Network SouthEast

Specifications
- Electric systems: 750 V DC third rail; 25 kV 50 Hz AC overhead lines (Class 316)
- Current collection: Contact shoe (Class 457); Pantograph (Class 316)
- Track gauge: 1,435 mm (4 ft 8 1/2 in) standard gauge

Class 316 and Class 457 were TOPS classifications assigned to a single electric multiple unit (EMU) at different stages of its use as a prototype for the Networker series.

== Project ==
In the late 1980s, the Network SouthEast division of British Rail, which operated the railway network in South East England, started to develop a new standard train, known as the Networker. To test out the technical arrangements for the Networker, a test train was used, converted from former Class 210 carriages, which were built in 1982 by Derby Litchurch Lane Works as prototype 'Second Generation' Diesel Electric Multiple Unit (DEMU), but were withdrawn after a few years.

=== Class 457 ===
Initially the test unit was formed for trials on the 750 V DC third rail system of the Southern Region, and was numbered 457001. As with all Southern Region electric multiple units only the last four digits of the unit number were actually carried. The unit formation was:

Vehicle Number	Vehicle Type	From unit
67300	DMSO	210001
67400	TSO	210002
67401	TSO	210001
67301	DMSO	210002

=== Class 316 ===
Later, the unit was altered to undertake trials on the 25 kV 50 Hz AC overhead line system used on electrified lines north of the River Thames. The unit was renumbered as a Class 316 unit, number 316999. To enable it to work on the AC electrification, a pantograph trailer from a Class 313 unit 313034 was inserted into the set, replacing one of the intermediate trailers. This spare vehicle (no. 67400) was later incorporated into a Class 455/9 DC suburban unit, replacing a damaged Trailer Second Open (TSO) vehicle.

The unit formation was:

Vehicle Number	Vehicle Type	From unit
67300	DMSO	210001
71246	PTSO	313034
67401	TSO	210001
67301	DMSO	210002

=== Preservation ===
After the AC trials were complete, the set was returned to the Southern Region for storage, minus the Class 313 trailer, which returned to its previous formation. The two driving cars were preserved at the Electric Railway Museum, Warwickshire, one being resold to the Eversholt Rail Group and inserted into set 455913 in 2013 after being rebuilt at Wolverton railway works to replace a carriage destroyed in an accident. The vehicle (67301) was converted to a 455 MSO. The remaining intermediate trailer was scrapped.

Vehicle details are shown below:

Key:	Scrapped	Preserved

Vehicle Number	Vehicle Type	Former Number	Disposal Details
67300	DMSO	60300	Preserved at East Kent Railway
67400	TSO	60400	Inserted into Class 455/9 unit 5912. Scrapped in June/July 2025.
67401	TSO	60401	Scrapped, Body still in one piece
67301	DMSO	60301	Converted to MSO and inserted into Class 455/9 unit 5913. Scrapped in September 2025.
