= Electric Railway Museum =

Former railway museum in Warwickshire, England

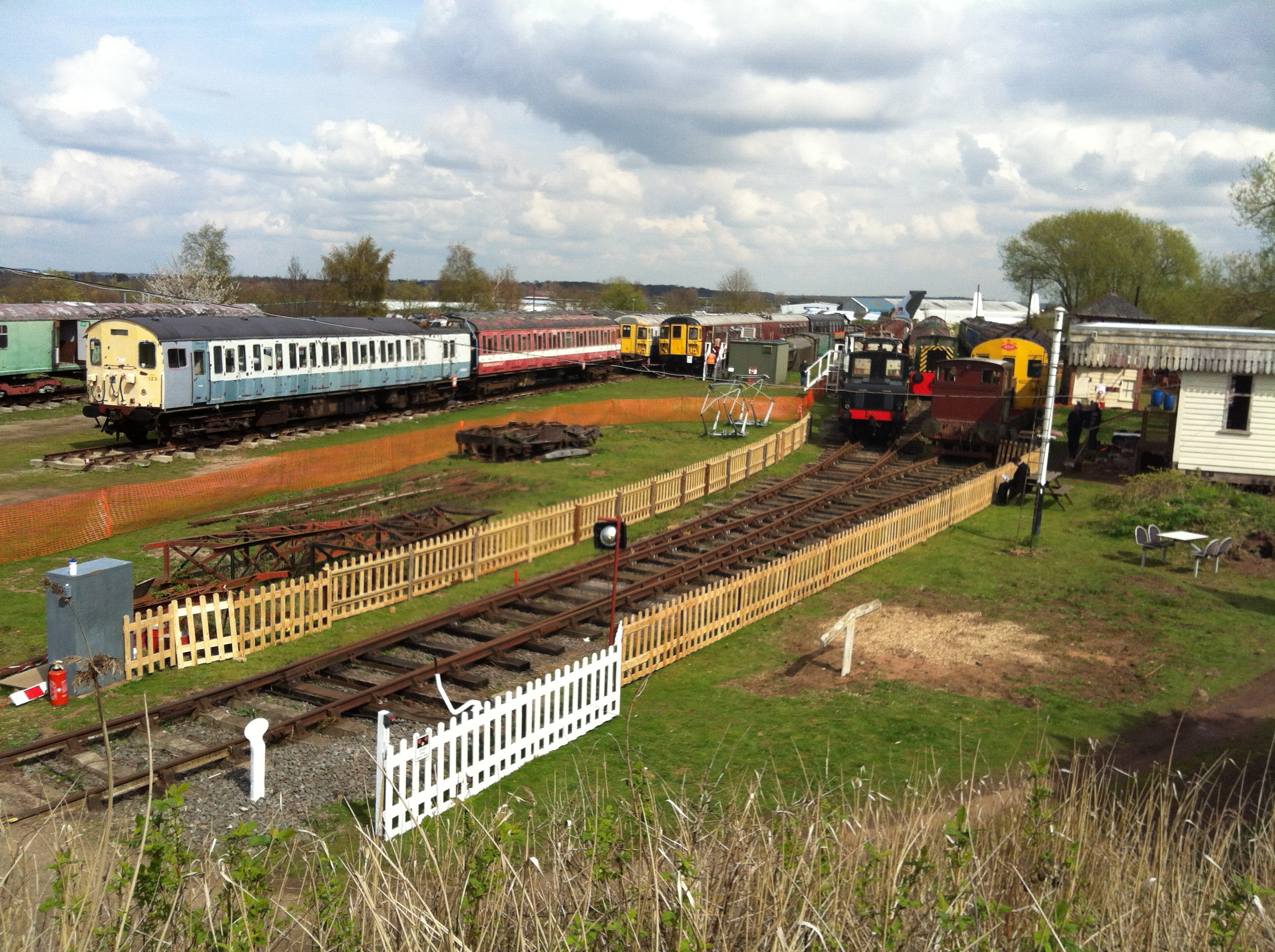
- The museum in April 2012

- Location within Warwickshire
- Established: 1986; 40 years ago
- Dissolved: 2017
- Location: Baginton, Warwickshire, England
- Coordinates: 52°22′25″N 1°28′54″W
- Type: Railway museum
- Website: electricrailwaymuseum.co.uk

The Electric Railway Museum (formerly the Coventry Railway Centre) was located near to the village of Baginton, south-east of Coventry, in Warwickshire, England. The heritage railway centre was immediately adjacent to Coventry Airport and so it was also known as "The Airfield Line"; the site was leased from Coventry City Council. On 9 July 2017, it was announced that, owing to the site being sold for development, the museum would close on 8 October 2017. The site was cleared by the end of July 2018 and all railway items and heritage buildings found new homes.

The site was managed by the Electric Railway Museum Limited and was home to a sizeable collection of preserved electric multiple units (EMUs), which was the most diverse and historically significant collection of EMUs in the UK, containing unique items that are the last survivors of once typical and numerous classes. In addition, there were small industrial electric locomotives, two small industrial diesel locomotives and one small industrial petrol locomotive, along with some other railway vehicles owned by third parties.

== History ==
=== Coventry Steam Railway Centre ===
The site was originally established as the Coventry Steam Railway Centre in 1986 by a group who set out to preserve Hudswell Clarke 0-6-0 tank locomotive number 1857. The group established the site and located the locomotive and other collected items of motive power, rolling stock and infrastructure, including Little Bowden Junction's Midland Railway signal box. The land was previously used as part of the municipal water treatment works and there had never been any railway infrastructure there until the creation of the centre.

=== Suburban Electric Railway Association ===
With a small membership, progress was slow and ground to a halt by the mid-1990s. The late 1990s saw one of the original founders retire due to ill health and he sold his interest in the site to a consortium of Suburban Electric Railway Association (SERA) members, except the tank engine which was sold to another railway. By 2004, the other founders had left and SERA took over sole running of the site.

=== Electric Railway Museum ===
In 2009, the responsibility of managing the site passed to Electric Railway Museum Limited, a charitable company which had been established in 2007 to create a permanent home for preserving and representing Britain's electric railway heritage. With this development, the original Coventry Railway Centre Limited company was wound up and its assets passed to Electric Railway Museum Limited. The site was open to the public, and group and individual visits could be admitted by prior booking. The first Chairman was Graeme Gleaves and the museum held its first public open day in September 2010. In 2011, the ERM won the Heritage Railway Association Best Small Group award.

=== Closure ===
On 9 July 2017, it was announced that the museum would close on 8 October 2017, (Note: The last open day of the year.) owing to the site being sold for development. The future of the museum and its collection of unique electric multiple units and other items was uncertain at that time, with efforts to raise £10,000 underway to cover the costs of moving the stock to an as yet unknown location.

Ruston & Hornsby 88 diesel shunter, nicknamed Crabtree, and Class 309 unit 960 101 were moved to the Tanat Valley Light Railway in May 2018, with the EMU to serve as a static museum and buffet train at Nantmawr.

== Track layout ==
The track layout comprised two three-road fans of sidings. Those at the end of the site adjacent to the Midlands Air Museum were complete with a headshunt that ran through a 40 metres (130 ft) cutting that was excavated by the members of the original steam centre in the early nineties. The sidings nearest Rowley Road were unconnected. The sidings were protected by an inner fence to create a secure compound.

== Stock ==
The vast majority of items not being actively restored were sheeted over to protect them from rusting, vandalism and other damage.

=== Electric multiple units ===
==== Overhead ====
- Class 307 vehicle 75023 (DT) in BR blue; moved subsequently to the Colne Valley Railway
- Class 308 vehicle 75881 (DTCoL); moved to the Colne Valley Railway
- Class 309 units 960 101 and 960 102; moved to the Lavender Line and Tanat Valley Light Railway
- Class 312 vehicles 78037 (DTCoL) and 71205 (TSO); moved to the Colne Valley Railway
- Class 370 vehicle 49006 (NDM); moved to the Crewe Heritage Centre.

==== Third rail ====
- Class 405 4Sub unit 4732, vehicle nos: 12795-12354-10239-12796; moved to Locomotive Storage Ltd
- Class 414 2Hap unit 4311, vehicle nos: 61287-75407; moved to Peak Rail
- Class 416 2EPB units 932053 and 6307; moved to the Battlefield Line Railway and Hope Farm, Sellindge, Kent
- Class 457 unit 7001 vehicle 67300; moved to East Kent Railway
- Class 503 two-car unit formed of DMBS vehicle 61183 + DTBS vehicle 75186 moved to MoD Bicester
- Class 503 unit 28690+29720+29289; moved to Locomotive Storage Ltd.

==== Other ====
- Liverpool Overhead Railway rebuilt first class Trailer Car No. 7; moved to Hope Farm, Sellindge.

=== Locomotives ===
==== Diesel ====
- Ruston & Hornsby 0-4-0 diesel-electric 165DE b. 1950 Wks. no. 268881 Mazda (operational); moved to the Battlefield Line Railway
- Ruston & Hornsby 4wd Diesel Mechanical 88DS b. 1953 Wks. no. 338416 Crabtree (undergoing restoration); moved to the Tanat Valley Light Railway.

==== Electric ====
- Spondon Power Station No. 1 = 4wd battery/Overhead Electric Loco b. 1935 English Electric Wks. no. E905 (operational); moved to the Battlefield Line Railway
- Kearsley Power Station no. 1 = Bo-Bo Overhead 550vDC b. 1928 Hawthorn Leslie Wks no. 3682 (awaiting restoration); moved to the East Kent Railway
- Heysham Power Station no. 1 = Bo-Bo Battery b. 1945 Robert Stephenson and Hawthorns Wks no. 7284 "Doug Tottman" (operational); moved to the Colne Valley Railway.

=== Coaches ===
- No. 135 City and South London Railway Wood Body Carriage; moved to Hope Farm, Sellindge
- No. 163 City and South London Railway Steel Body Carriage; moved to Neasden Depot
- No. 60750 / RDB 975386 experimental tilting coach 'Hastings'; moved to the Battlefield Line Railway.

== Gallery ==
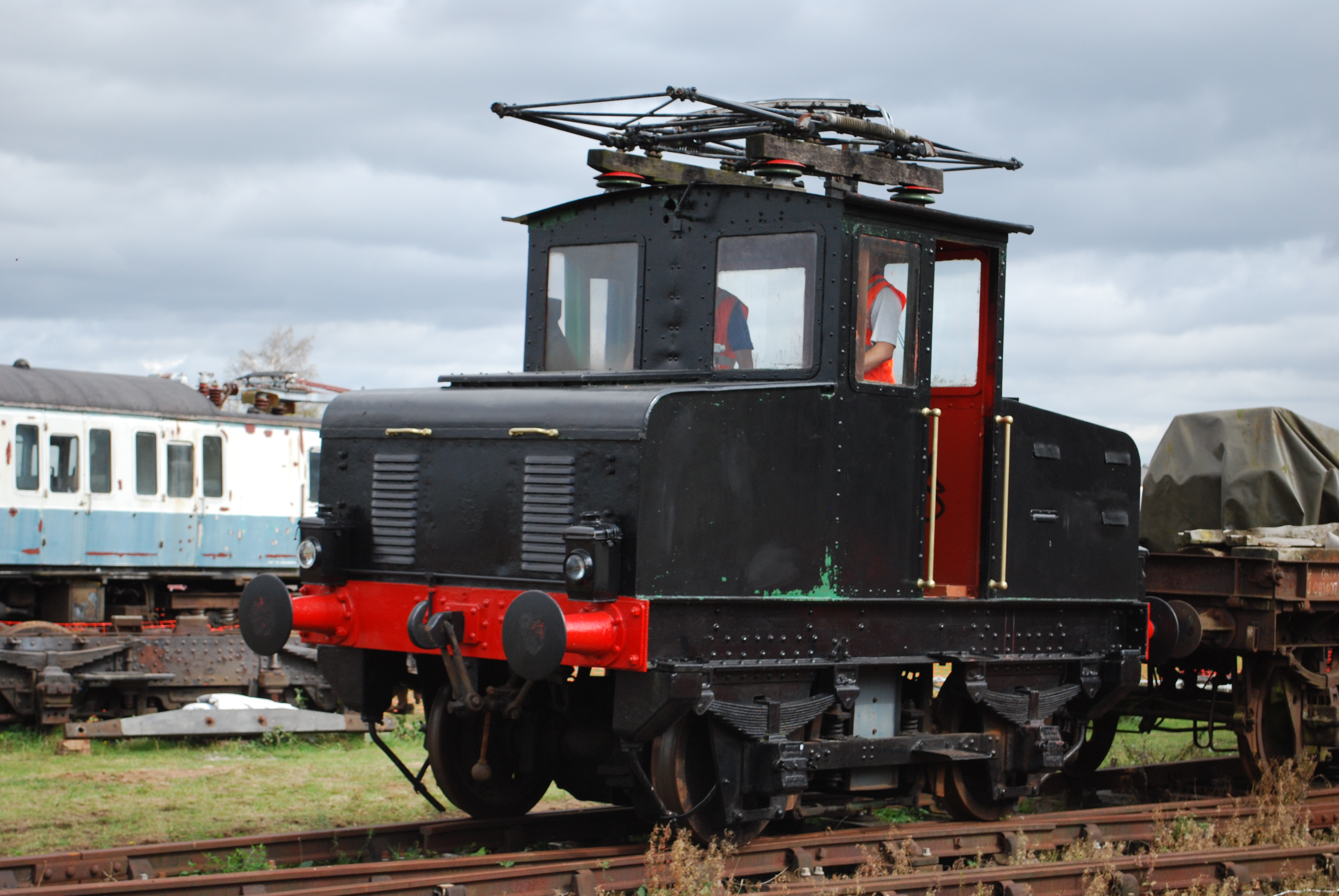
English Electric Spondon No. 1 E905

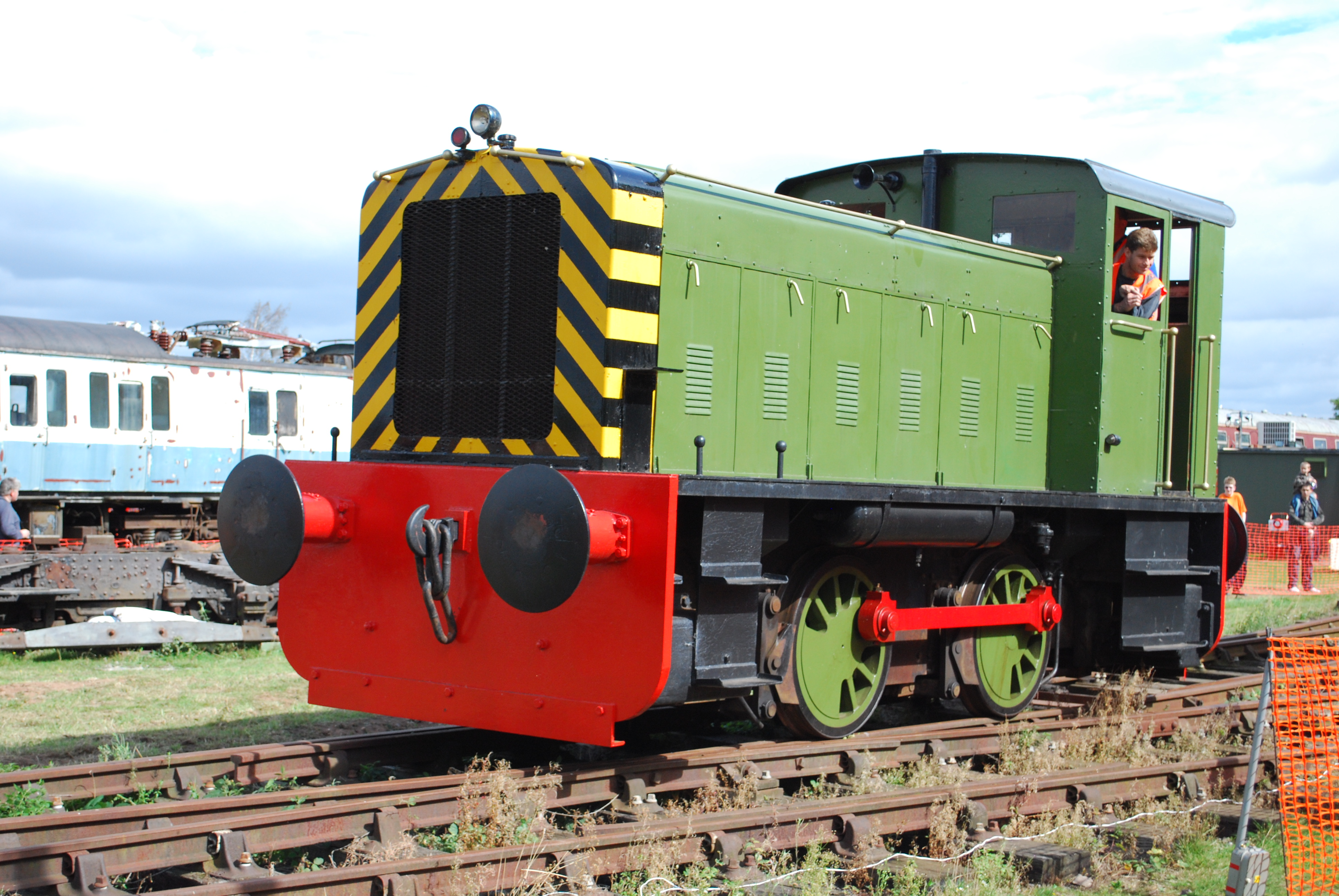
Ruston 0-4-0DE No. 268881 Mazda

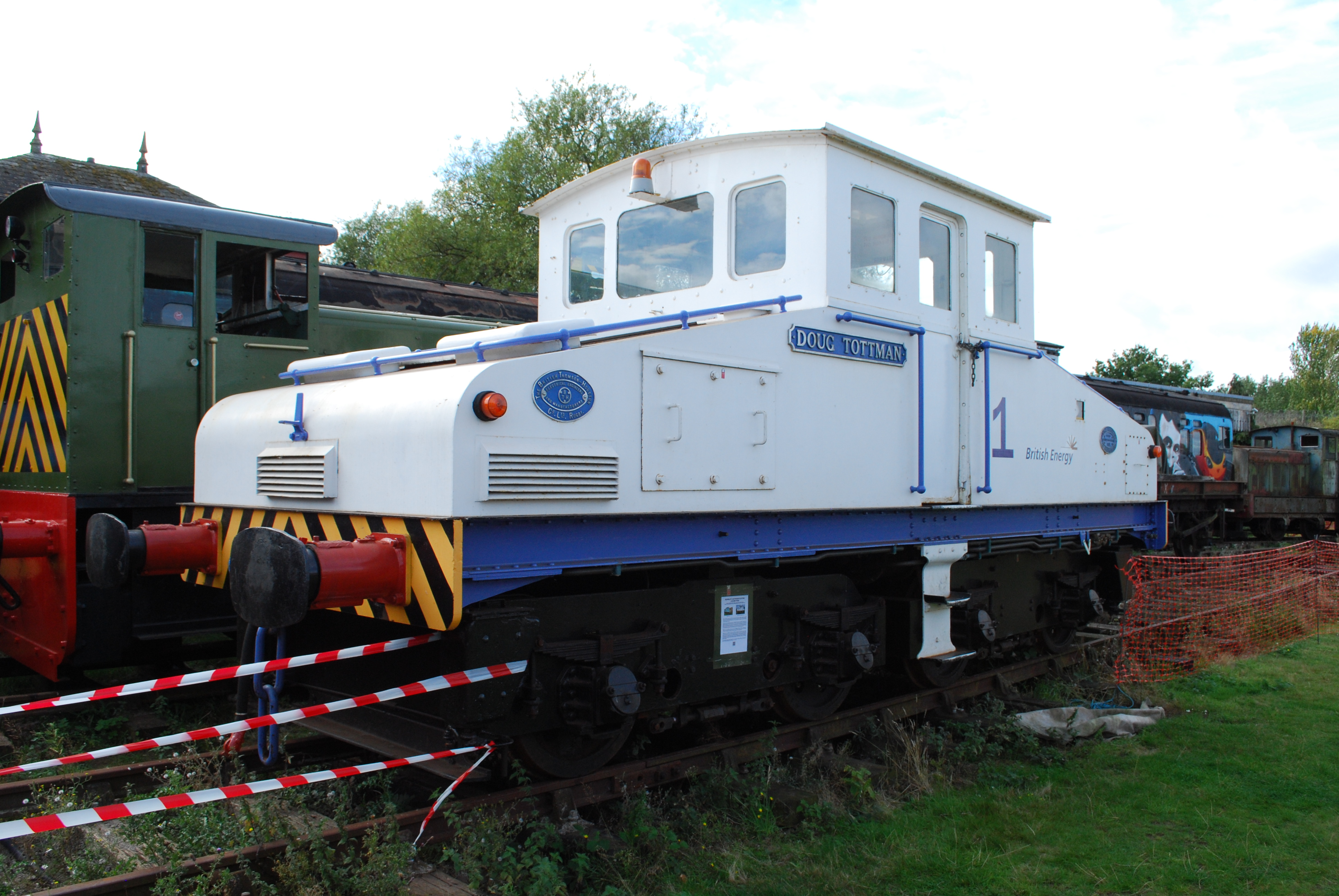
RSH No. 7284 Doug Tottman

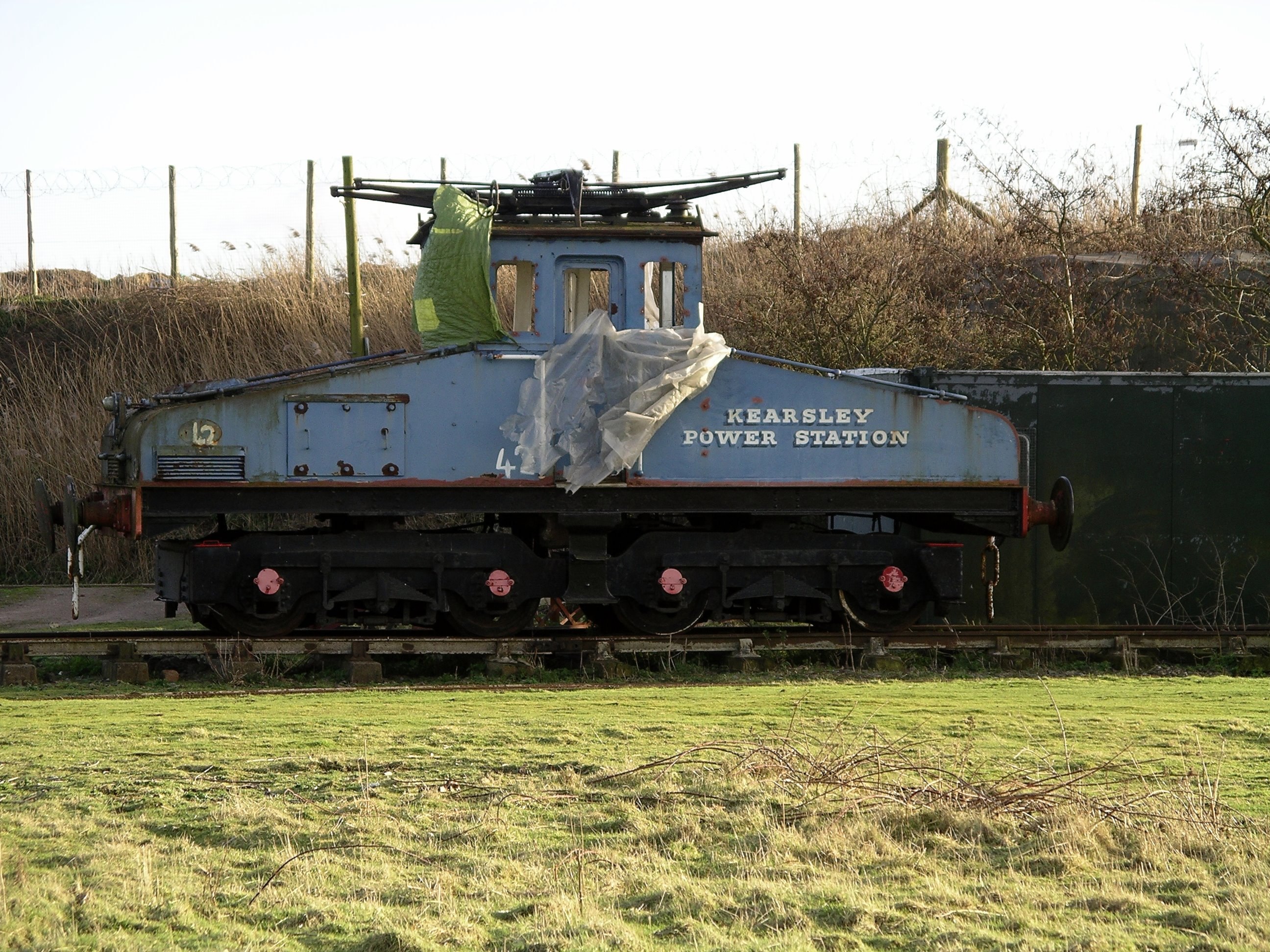
Hawthorn Leslie Kearsley Power Station No. 1

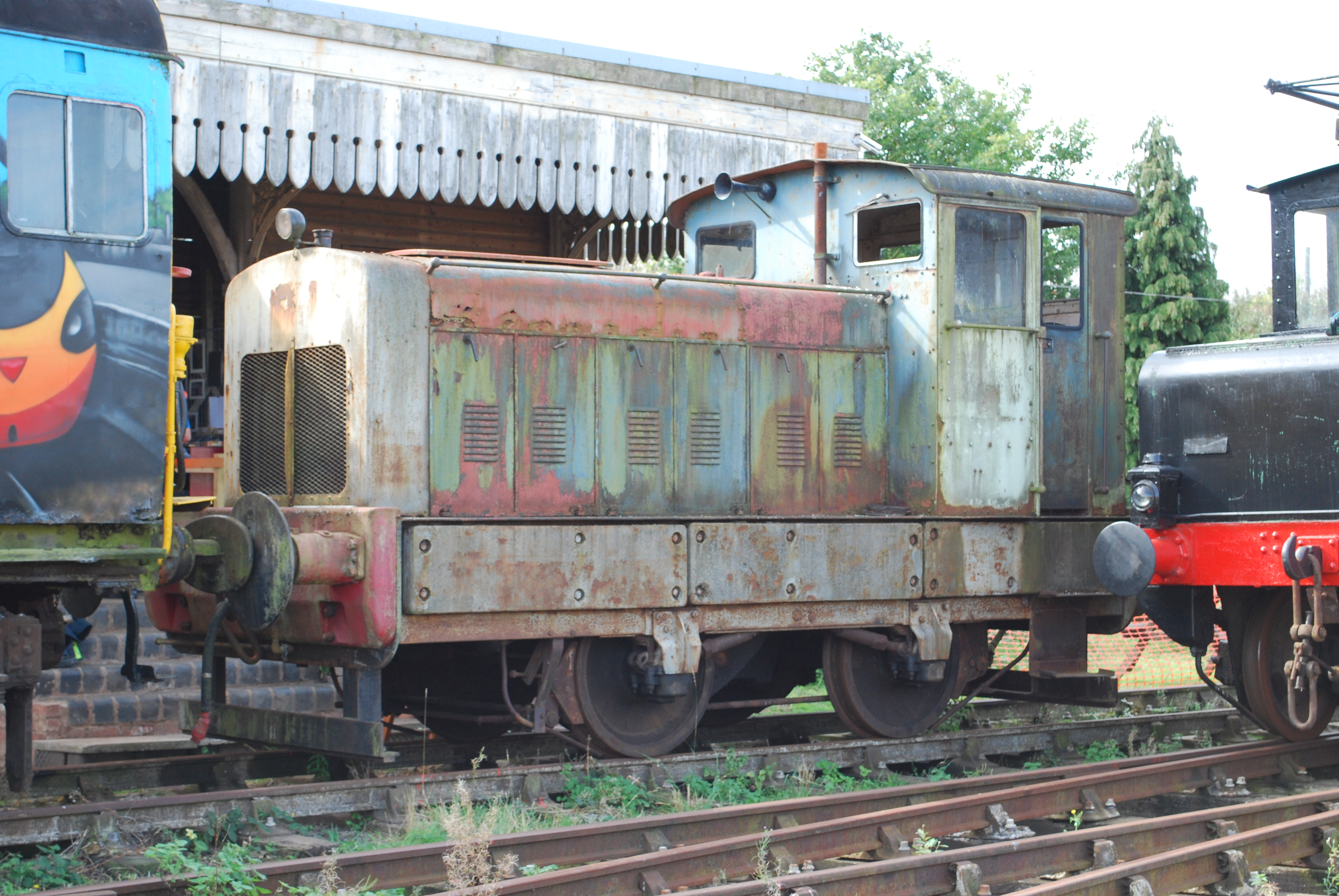
Ruston 88DS 4wd No. 338416 Crabtree

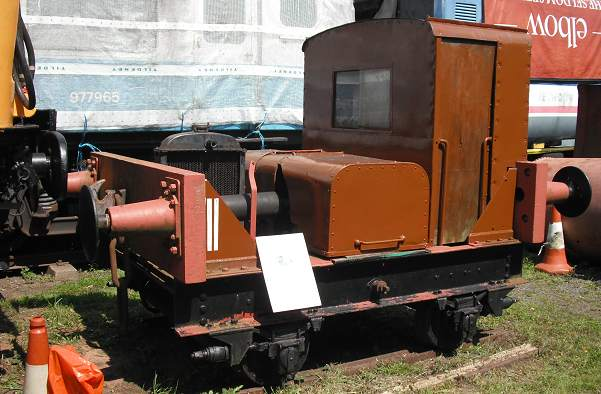
Hibberd 4wd no. 2895

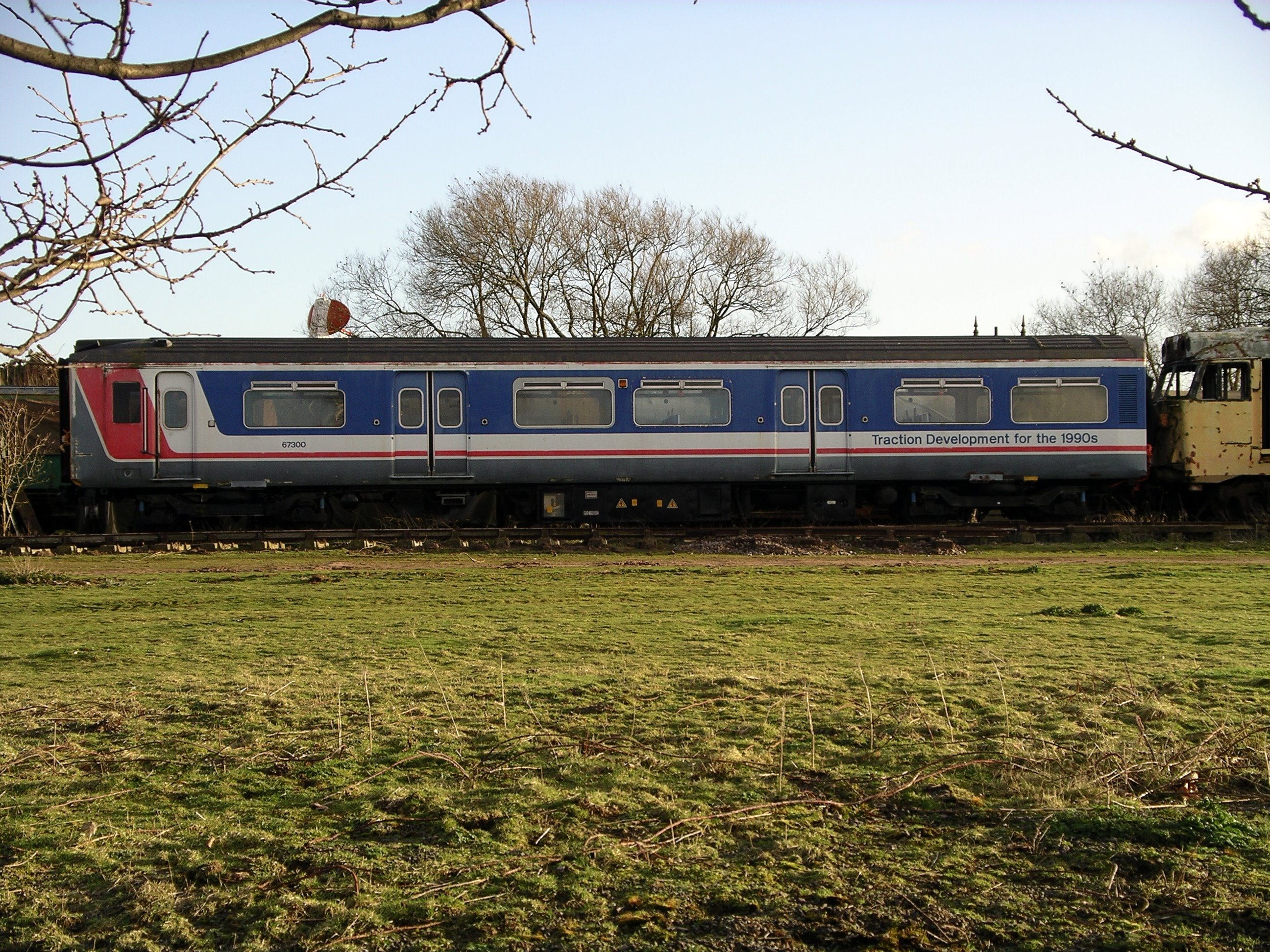
Class 457, unit 7001, vehicle 67300

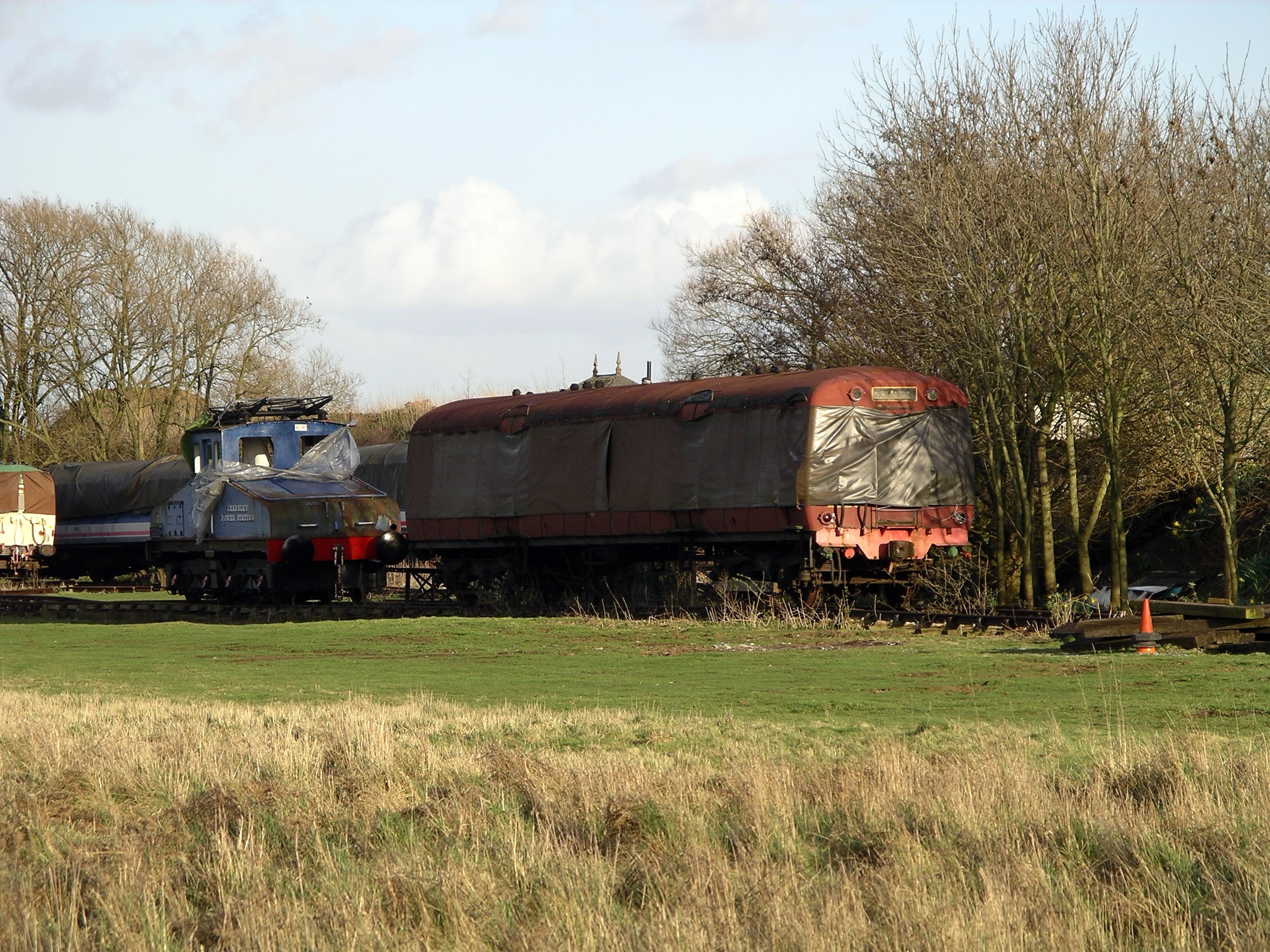
Class 503, DTS no. 29289.
