= GEC Traction =

GEC Traction Limited
- Company type: Plc / subsidiary
- Industry: Mechanical and electrical engineering
- Predecessor: English Electric-AEI Traction Limited
- Founded: 1972
- Defunct: 1989
- Fate: Subsumed within Alstom
- Successor: GEC Alsthom Traction Ltd, later Alstom Traction Ltd, later Alstom Transport
- Headquarters: Trafford Park, Manchester, England
- Key people: John Legg, Keith Appelbee (Managing Directors)
- Products: Railway traction equipment

GEC Traction Limited was a British industrial company formed in 1972 which designed and manufactured electric traction equipment for railway rolling stock. The company had manufacturing sites at Manchester, Preston and Sheffield and was a wholly owned subsidiary of General Electric Company.

== History ==
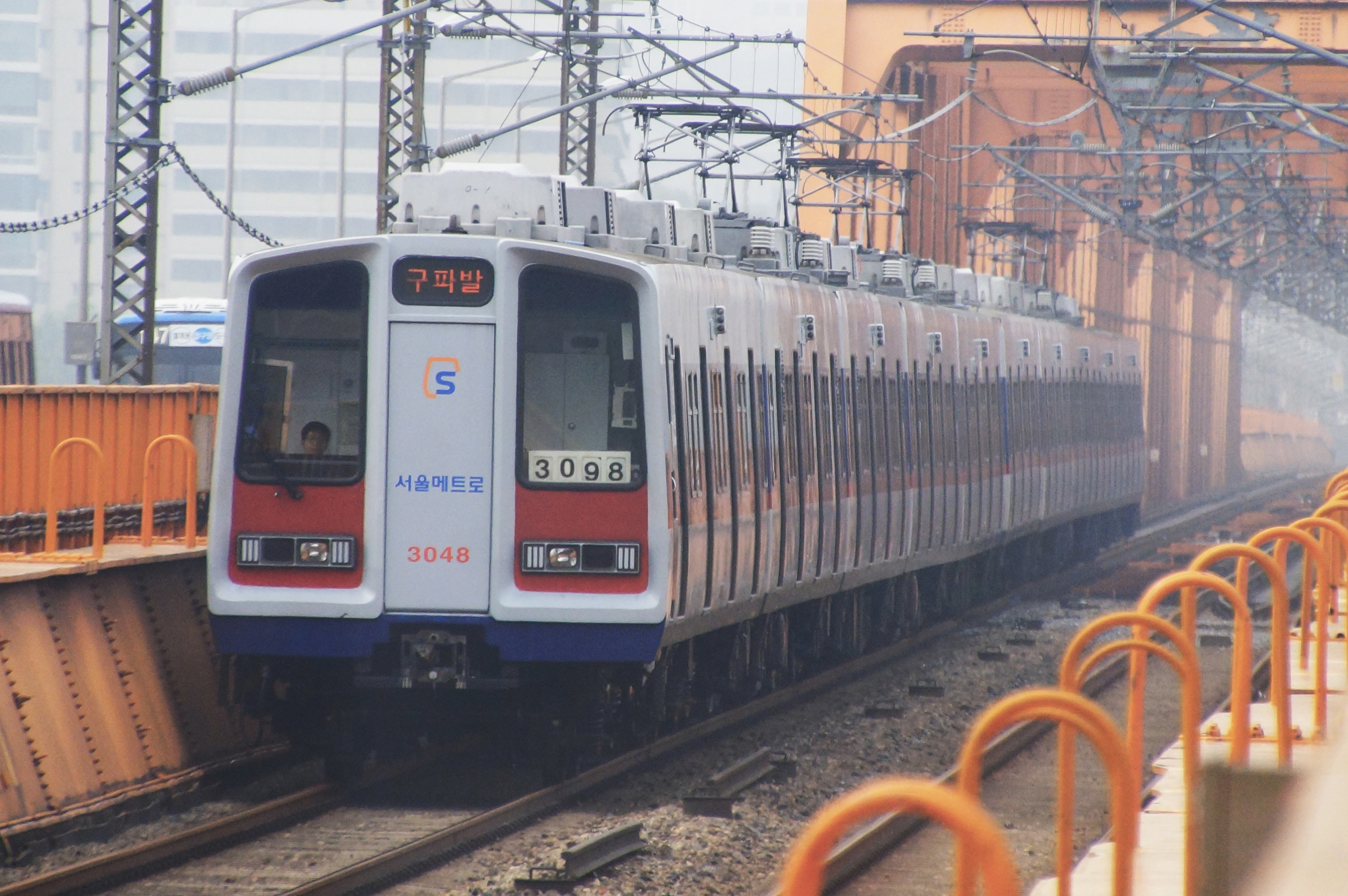
Wide-width Seoul Metro 3000 series train using GEC Traction equipment, introduced on Seoul Subway Line 4 in 1985, transferred to Seoul Subway Line 3 from 1989–93. Some units rebuilt in the early-2010s, all units retired in 2022.

The company's pedigree is traced back to a long list of British companies involved in railway traction almost to the start of the railway age in the first half of the 19th century. Included among the predecessor companies are the following:

- Robert Stephenson & Company, Newcastle-upon-Tyne (1823)
- Dick, Kerr & Co, Kilmarnock and Preston (1883)
- Siemens Brothers, London (1858)
- Vulcan Foundry Newton-le-Willows (1847)
- British Westinghouse, Manchester (1899)
- English Electric, London, Stafford and Preston (1917)
- British Thomson-Houston, Rugby (1896)
- Metropolitan Vickers, Manchester (1919)
- Associated Electrical Industries, Manchester and London (1925)
- Beyer, Peacock & Company, Stockton-on-Tees (1949)

The immediate history stemmed from the 1968 acquisition of Associated Electrical Industries (AEI) by GEC. In the following year GEC merged with (took over) the English Electric (EE), thus bringing together the two previously rival companies, AEI and EE, under single ownership. From this, in 1969, a new subsidiary company was born, English Electric-AEI Traction Ltd. This new organisation slowly integrated the traction divisions of AEI and EE, culminating in 1972 when the company was renamed GEC Traction Ltd. Also added to the company was the Industrial Locomotive Division of the former English Electric which was based at Vulcan Works, Newton-le-Willows (this later became a separate company, GEC Industrial Locomotives Ltd).

The company that became GEC Traction Ltd. was originally incorporated on 6 May 1927.

In June 1973, the Company celebrated "150 years in Motive Power" dating from the establishment of the first company in the world specifically created for the design and manufacture of railway locomotives, Robert Stephenson & Company in Newcastle.

For the greater part of the 18 years in which the Company existed under the name GEC Traction, it was the leading supplier of traction equipment in the UK and also had sales around the world, particularly in South Africa, Australasia, Hong Kong, South Korea and Taiwan. Employment across the three sites totalled 3,500. In 1984, largely as a result of a cutback in orders by South African Railways, the Attercliffe Common works at Sheffield was closed, with the rotating machines business being absorbed at Preston and gear manufacture at GEC Machines, Rugby.

In April 1989, the company was conferred with the Queen's Awards for Enterprise in the field of electronic railway propulsion equipment. A few weeks thereafter, a merger was agreed between the power and transport businesses of GEC and those of Alsthom of France, part of Compagnie Générale d'Electricité (CGE). As a result, GEC Traction became a subsidiary of this newly formed Anglo-French group, GEC Alsthom, and was consequently renamed GEC Alsthom Traction Ltd on 1 July 1989.

As part of a rationalisation of the business the Company was further contracted from 1991 to 1998, with the eventual closing of all activities at Trafford Park in 1998, and the remaining business being concentrated at Preston or transferred to sites in France.

In December 1997, GEC and Alcatel Alsthom of France announced a flotation of their joint venture on the Paris stock exchange, to comprise 52% of the share capital, with each of the partners reducing to 24% of the shares each. The company was successfully floated in June 1998 and changed to the simpler name, Alstom. GEC and Alcatel subsequently sold their remaining stakes. All references to the 'GEC' name and branding were removed from the ex-GEC businesses which remained in Alstom. GEC Alsthom Traction Ltd became Alstom Traction Ltd on 22 June 1998 and the company name survived to 19 August 2008, although increasingly integrated within the Transport division of Alstom.

The Alstom Transport factory at Preston was the last site of the former GEC Traction to remain open, albeit on a much reduced scale to that in the 1970s and 1980s. Having suffered around 500 job losses in August 2003, the Preston site was reported to be employing "around 240 people" in October 2010, and 180 people in October 2017.

In June 2017, Alstom announced that the Preston Strand Road site would close and be vacated by June 2018, and operations would be transferred to Alstom's new facility at Widnes (traction equipment engineering and production, and AC motors), terminated (DC motor repair and overhaul) or outsourced (logistics). Alstom activities on the Preston site finished on 31 July 2018; BAE Systems continue to have offices on the site and St Modwen, the site owner, is attempting to find a tenant for the vacated area.

== Factories and products ==
Trafford Park, Manchester – OS grid ref: SJ 792 961

Sited on a 127-acre complex to the south of Westinghouse Road and shared with other member companies of the GEC Power Engineering Group, this former Metropolitan Vickers and AEI site had the administrative headquarters of the company as well as manufacturing facilities. The site specialised in all types of traction control equipment.

In 1990 (date to be confirmed) the former Low Voltage Switchgear site at Trafford Park (West Works) was renovated to be the new manufacturing facility for GEC Alsthom Traction, with an electronics workshop, machine shop and plating baths and assembly shop for switchgear, equipment cases and power modules. This building was vacated in 1998 when power modules and switchgear was moved to Tarbes in southwest France.

Strand Road, Preston – OS grid ref: SD 525 296

Previously an English Electric Co site, and originally The Dick Kerr Works from 1901, GEC Traction occupied West Works (11 acres on the west side of Strand Road) from 1968. Both traction control equipment and rotating machines (motors, generators and auxiliary machines) were manufactured.

In 1994 under GEC-Alsthom, the main entrance was changed to the Dock side of the site off the newly formed 'Channel Way'. The site was sold off by Alstom in 2002 but immediately leased back by the company with Alstom stating that they had right of occupancy at least until 2018.

The site remained open as part of Alstom's service business for the manufacture, repair and overhaul of traction control equipment and rotating machines, and as a spare parts distribution centre, until July 2018. BAE Systems have occupied part of the site since 2006 as tenants of Alstom, and then from August 2018, of St Modwen; a return to Strand Road for BAE Systems who had closed their site there in 1990.

Attercliffe Common, Sheffield – OS grid ref: SK 389 899

This 9-acre site had specialised in traction rotating machine and gears production since 1923, latterly as an AEI factory before the formation of the company. The site was closed in 1984 and redeveloped, leaving little remaining to identify the original factory.
