= British Rail Engineering Limited =

1970–1992 railway rolling stock manufacturer

- Industry: Train & carriage manufacturing & maintenance
- Predecessor: British Rail Workshops
- Founded: 1 January 1970
- Defunct: September 1992
- Fate: Privatised
- Successor: ABB
- Headquarters: Derby, England
- Parent: British Railways Board (1969–1989)

British Rail Engineering Limited (BREL) was the rolling stock manufacturing and maintenance subsidiary of British Rail.

It was established on 1 January 1970 by the British Railways Board to operate its 14 rolling stock maintenance centres and to provide construction, maintenance, and repair services to Britain's railways. A key activity of BREL was the manufacturing of new rolling stock, such as the InterCity 125 trainset, the Mark 3 carriage, and the British Rail Class 58 freight locomotive. Both domestic and international sales were pursued; rolling stock produced by BREL was exported to various nations, including Ireland, Kenya, Gabon, Taiwan, Sweden, Malaysia, Yugoslavia, Thailand, and Bangladesh. Numerous projects were undertaken on a collaborative basis with private sector manufacturers, including Brush Traction, Metro-Cammell, and Metropolitan-Vickers. BREL also built numerous prototype rail vehicles, such as the Class 140 and Class 210 DEMUs and the experimental high-speed Advanced Passenger Train (APT) tilting train.

Throughout the 1980s, BREL was subjected to repeated restructuring and job cuts; various works, such as Ashford, Shildon, and Swindon were closed permanently. The organisation was effectively cut in two when the maintenance arm was split off as British Rail Maintenance Limited in 1987. The British government sought to make BREL more internationally competitive. The design and building of trains was privatised in 1989, purchased by the Swiss-Swedish conglomerate Asea Brown Boveri (40%), Trafalgar House (40%), and a management-employee buy-out (20%). After ABB became the sole shareholder in September 1992, it was subsumed into ABB Transportation.

== History ==
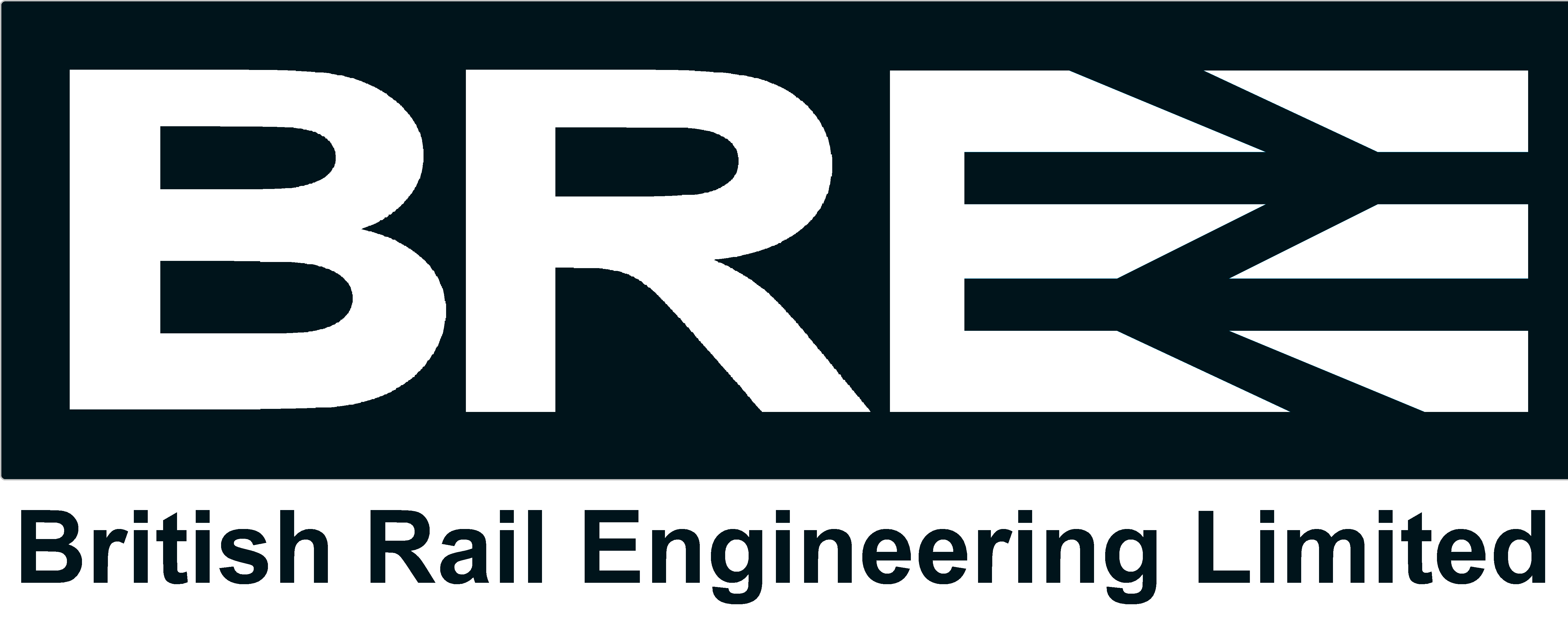
Variant logo used on rolling stock and corporate sales

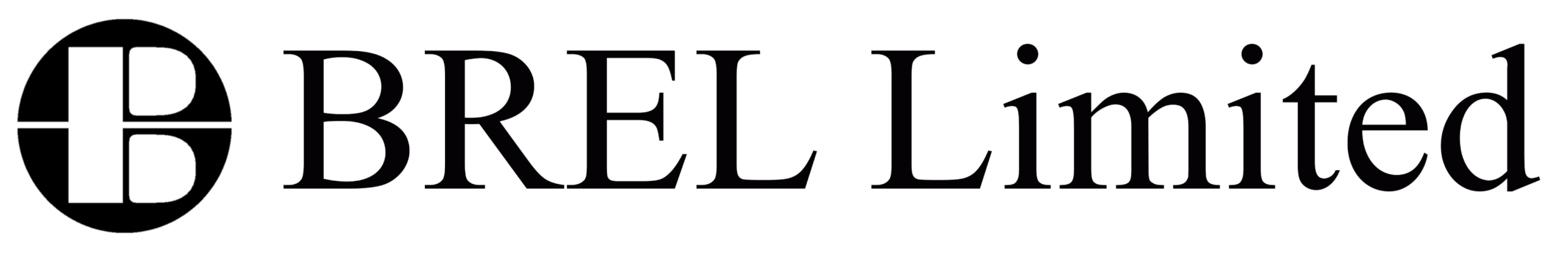
Later logo, circa 1991

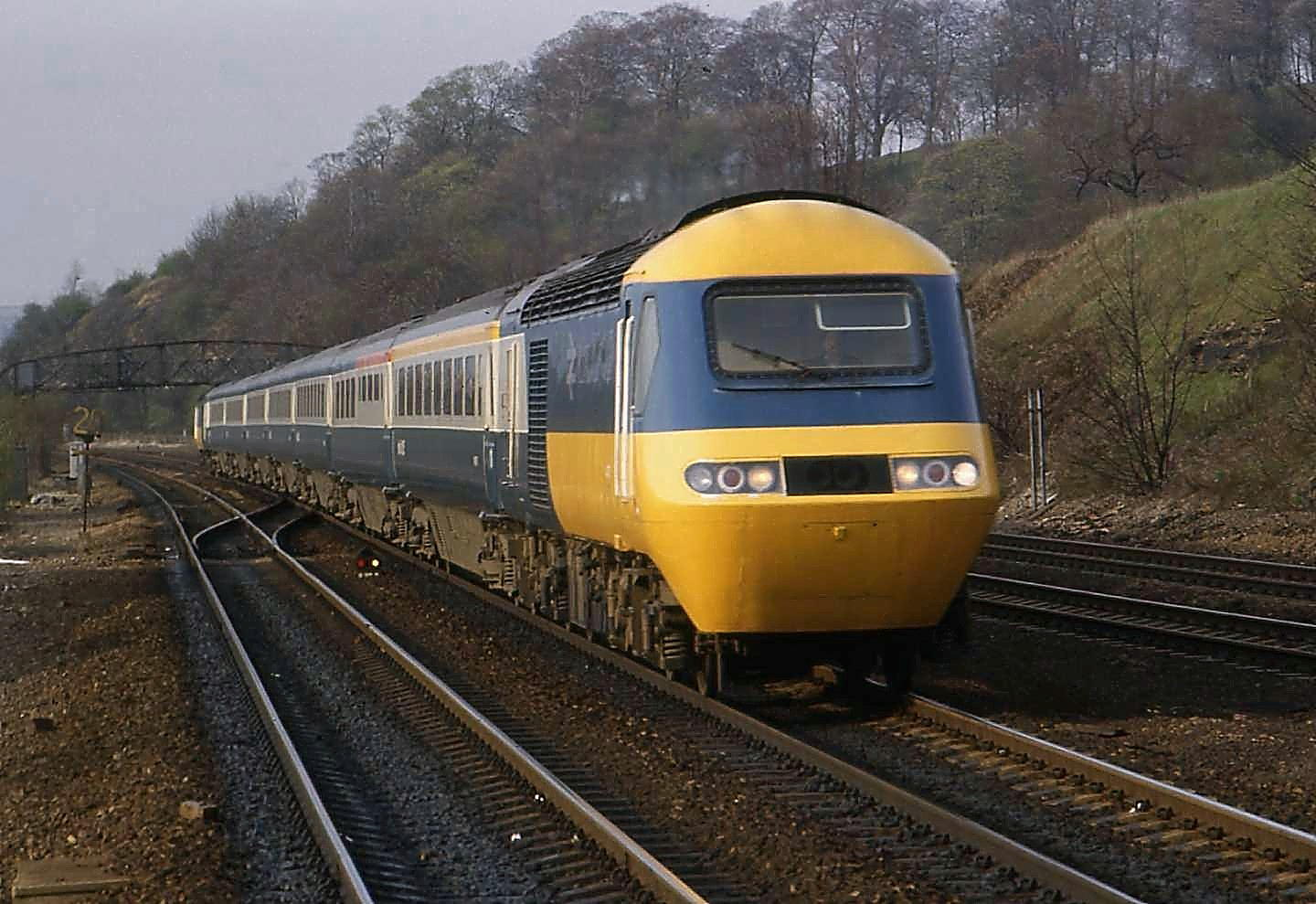
The InterCity 125 was formed from Class 43 powercars built at Crewe Works and Mark 3 carriages built at Derby Litchurch Lane Works

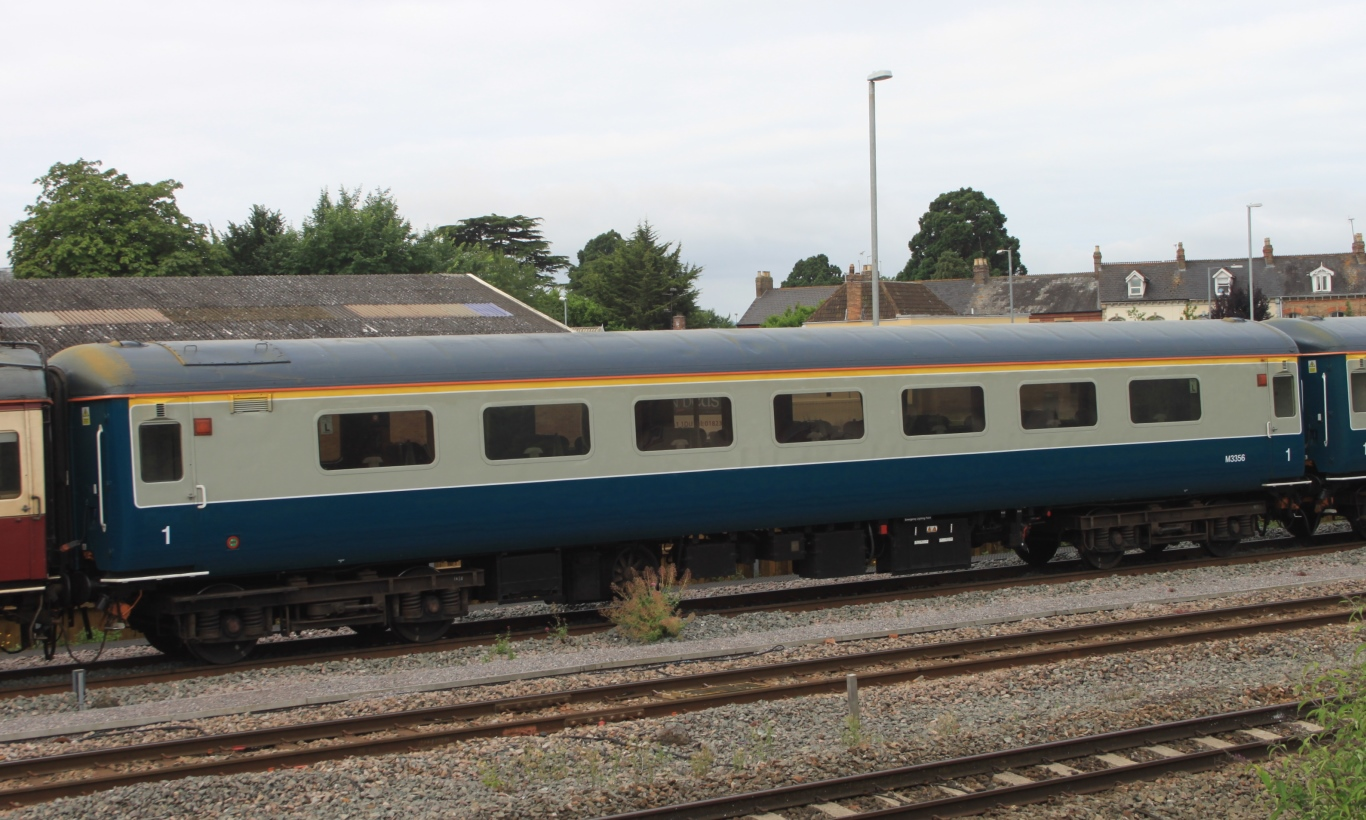
Mark 2 carriages were built by BREL's Derby Litchurch Lane Works

BREL was established by the British Railways Board on 1 January 1970 to take over the management of its 14 rolling stock maintenance centres, including Ashford, Crewe, Derby Litchurch Lane, Derby Locomotive, Doncaster, Eastleigh, Glasgow, Horwich, Shildon, Swindon, Wolverton, and York. The principal object of BREL was the provision of a construction, maintenance, and repair services to Britain's railways.

A key activity of BREL was the manufacturing of new rolling stock for use by British Rail. Amongst those rail vehicles is the InterCity 125 trainset; produced between 1975 and 1982 and commonly referred to as the High Speed Train, was a diesel-powered high speed passenger train that travelled faster than any previous production British train. In addition to production types, BREL built numerous prototypes, such as the Class 210 DEMU and the experimental high-speed Advanced Passenger Train (APT) tilting train.

BREL did not have a monopoly on the manufacture of new rail vehicles; various private companies, such as Brush Traction, Metro-Cammell, and Metropolitan-Vickers amongst others, also manufactured rolling stock for British Rail, although in general, it was built to specifications produced by BREL. Furthermore, BREL often acted as a subcontractor to a main contractor, such as GEC, which supplied traction equipment. These contracts typically required BREL to build the frames, body shells, and bogies and install the traction and ancillary equipment of the primary contractor. The majority of the electric locomotive construction programmes of the 1980s, such as Classes 89, 90, and 91, was carried out in this manner. The Sprinter and Pacer families of diesel multiple-units (DMUs) were also manufactured with an emphasis on collaboration and competitive forces.

In addition to the domestic market, BREL pursued international sales. The Mark 2 carriage proved to be attractive abroad, and derivatives were exported to Ireland, Kenya, and Taiwan. BREL's entry to the Chinese market in the late 1980s was hoped to lead to expansive orders for as many as 1,500 carriages. Freight wagons of various sorts were produced for overseas customers in Sweden, Malaysia, Yugoslavia, and Bangladesh. BREL was also a major supplier of components and general engineering equipment to numerous businesses that were not primarily involved in railways, such as the British Steel Corporation. During the 1980s, BREL produced the British Rail Class 58 freight locomotive, which it had developed with the intention of attracting international orders.

Throughout the 1980s, various sites operated by BREL were permanently closed, including Ashford Works in 1981, Shildon in 1984, and Swindon in 1986. During 1987, Doncaster, Eastleigh, Glasgow, and Wolverton were transferred to the newly created BR Maintenance. The maintenance requirements of British Rail's rolling stock was reduced as newer vehicles, such as the Mark 3 carriages, were introduced that were designed to minimise operating costs; British Rail also progressively increased its use of electric traction which required less maintenance than diesel-powered trains, further reducing demand for BREL's services and leading to cuts in personnel employed by the organisation. The loss of such jobs and the closure of certain sites became a politically charged matter during the late 1980s, which included threats of industrial action and allegations of insufficient investment.

As early as 1986, the British government were examining operations to privatise BREL and make it more competitive on the international market. The Secretary of State for Transport announced on 24 November 1987 that BREL would be sold, with a plan to invite offers by the spring of 1988. Accordingly, amid the wider privatisation of British Rail during the 1990s, BREL was sold via a management buyout, with management and employees owning 20% and Asea Brown Boveri and Trafalgar House 40% each. At the time of the management buyout, BREL's locations comprised Crewe, York, and two separate works in Derby; Derby Locomotive Works was closed in 1991. In March 1992, ABB bought out the other shareholders, making BREL a wholly owned subsidiary. It was subsumed into ABB Transportation in September 1992.

== Products ==
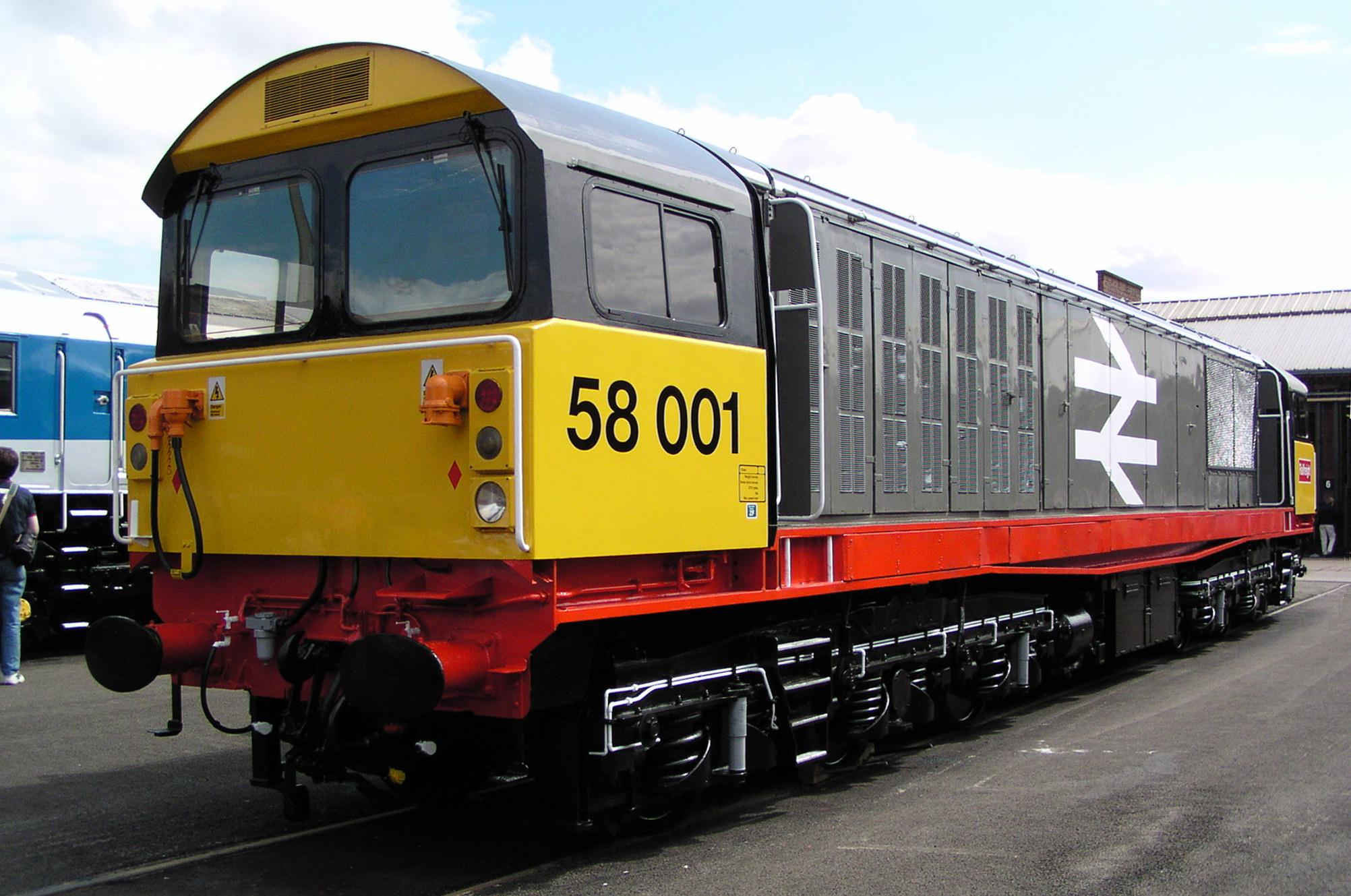
Class 58 locomotives were built by BREL's Doncaster Works

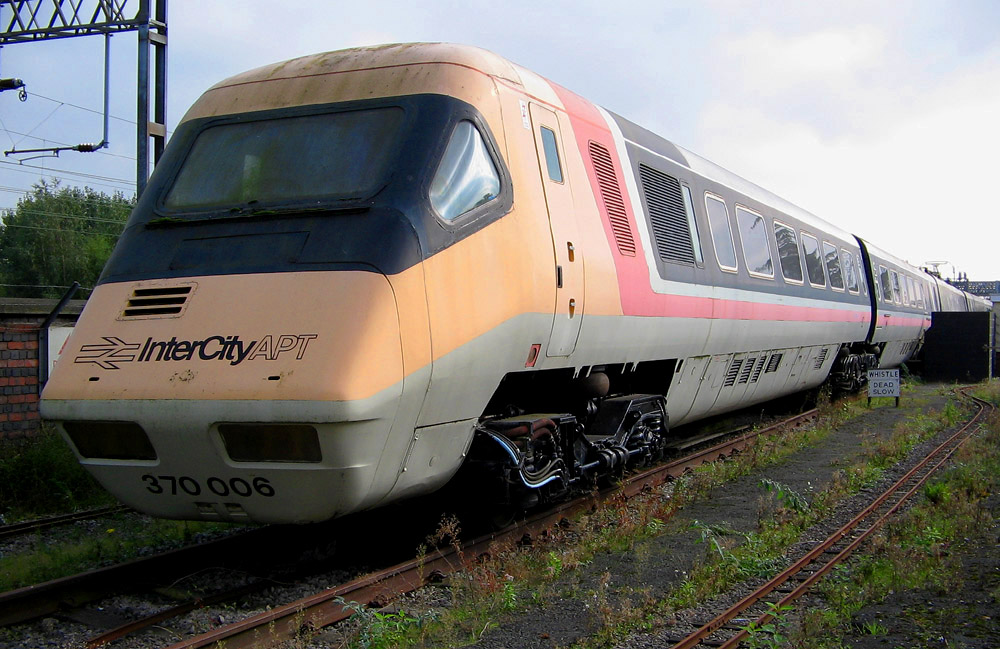
An APT-P at Crewe in October 2006

The vast majority of BREL's output was rolling stock for British Rail, including Mark 2 and Mark 3 carriages, the latter for locomotive haulage and InterCity 125 diesel High-Speed Trains. BREL built the NIR 80 Class diesel-electric multiple units for Northern Ireland Railways. Other Mark 3 derived vehicles included Class 150 diesel multiple units in the 1980s and numerous electric multiple units such as Classes 313 and 317.

BREL had success in the export market, notably with Mark 2 and Mark 3 carriages for Iarnród Éireann and the Taiwan Railway EMU100 series. Rolling stock was also manufactured for Ghana, Kenya, Malaysia, and Tanzania.

=== Diesels ===
- Class 41
- Class 43
- Class 56
- Class 58

=== Electrics ===
- Class 87
- Class 89
- Class 90
- Class 91

=== Multiple units ===
- Class 140
- Class 141
- Class 142
- Class 150
- Class 158
- Class 159
- Class 165
- Class 166
- Class 210
- Class 312
- Class 313
- Class 314
- Class 315
- Class 316/457
- Class 317
- Class 318
- Class 319
- Class 320
- Class 321
- Class 322
- Class 370
- Class 442
- Class 445/446
- Class 455
- Class 456
- Class 465
- Class 507
- Class 508
- Class 510
- NIR Class 80
- NIR Class 450
- Taiwan Railway EMU100 series
- State Railway of Thailand ASR class

BREL also produced some railbuses.

=== Coaches ===
- Mark 2
- Mark 3
- Mark 4 (bodyshells)
