= London Bridge Area Signalling Centre =

Signal box in London Borough of Southwark, London, England

Coordinates: 51°30′09.1″N 0°04′56.1″W

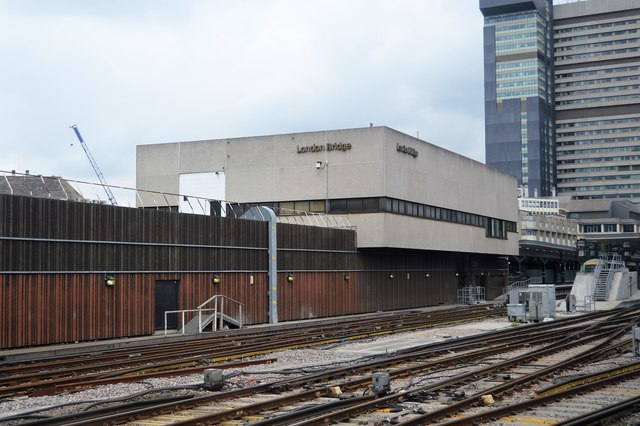
London Bridge Area Signalling Centre (ASC)

London Bridge Area Signalling Centre (ASC) was a signalling centre on the Kent Route of Network Rail, principally covering the line from London (Charing Cross, Cannon Street and London Bridge) to Kent and Sussex route areas of Network Rail. The signalling centre was opened in 1974, and closed in 2020.

== History ==
=== Background ===
In the 1970s, a substantial project to resignal railway lines into the three railway termini of Charing Cross, Cannon Street and London Bridge was initiated. This involved consolidating 16 signal boxes into one new Area Signalling Centre, to be located at London Bridge – as well as partially rebuilding London Bridge station.

In 1972, work began to segregate the trains before their arrival at London Bridge. Prior to the development of the ASC, Cannon Street and Charing Cross trains arrived on all lines and were signalled approaching or leaving to London Bridge station to their respective destinations. To facilitate this, the Borough Market signal box (opened in 1895) required two full time signallers, and handled over 100 trains per hour. This project would allow it and other signal boxes to be consolidated into a new, modern signalling centre – with signallers assisted by computers and substantial automation.

=== Building ===
After searching for an appropriate location, a site at the country end of London Bridge station was chosen. The building was built on top of the Grade II listed railway arches on the south side of the station. The building was designed by in-house British Rail Southern Region architects, in a Brutalist style. The upper section of the building is about two-thirds the length and slightly wider than the lower storey, projecting over live railway lines. It is clad with white concrete slabs in a contrast to the lower storey's brown walls. The lower floor housed the signalling equipment, as well as the offices and mess facilities for the signals maintenance team. The upper floor contained the control panels for the signallers.

=== Commissioning ===
In 1974, the first section of the control panel in the London Bridge ASC was commissioned, with trains first being signalled from the new ASC in 1975. As work continued, redundant signal boxes such as the old 1923-built London Bridge signal box were closed one by one and consolidated into the new ASC at London Bridge. In 1975, British Transport Films produced 'Operation London Bridge', a short film about the project. In 1976, the Borough Market signal box was closed – with the historic signal box acquired by the National Railway Museum. The ASC was visited by the Duke of Edinburgh in 1976.

By December 1978, the project had been completed, costing £23.8 million. Traffic bound for Charing Cross and Cannon Street was now segregated outside London Bridge, mainly at Parks Bridge Junction but occasionally in the New Cross area. The London Bridge central traffic was kept as a separate working railway from the eastern side.

== London Bridge ASC ==
At its height, the London Bridge ASC was one of the busiest signal boxes on the British Rail network, controlling trains from Charing Cross on the routes out to Kent through Greenwich, Lewisham, Grove Park, and to Norwood Junction. It controlled 47.3 miles (76.1 km) of route, which is just over 147.8 miles (237.9 km) of track. Open 24 hours a day throughout the year, it took a total of 60 signallers and 4 shift signalling managers to run the signalling centre.

== Closure ==
Following resignalling work as part of the Thameslink Programme, the majority of the functions of the signal box were transferred to Three Bridges ROC (Regional Operating Centre) in 2014.

In 2020, the last area signalled by the ASC (Hither Green to Grove Park) was transferred to Three Bridges ROC, with the London Bridge Area Signalling Centre operating its last day on 24 July 2020. As of August 2020, Network Rail have decommissioned the signalling centre and are seeking new uses for the redundant building.
