= Thameslink Programme =

Rail transport project in London

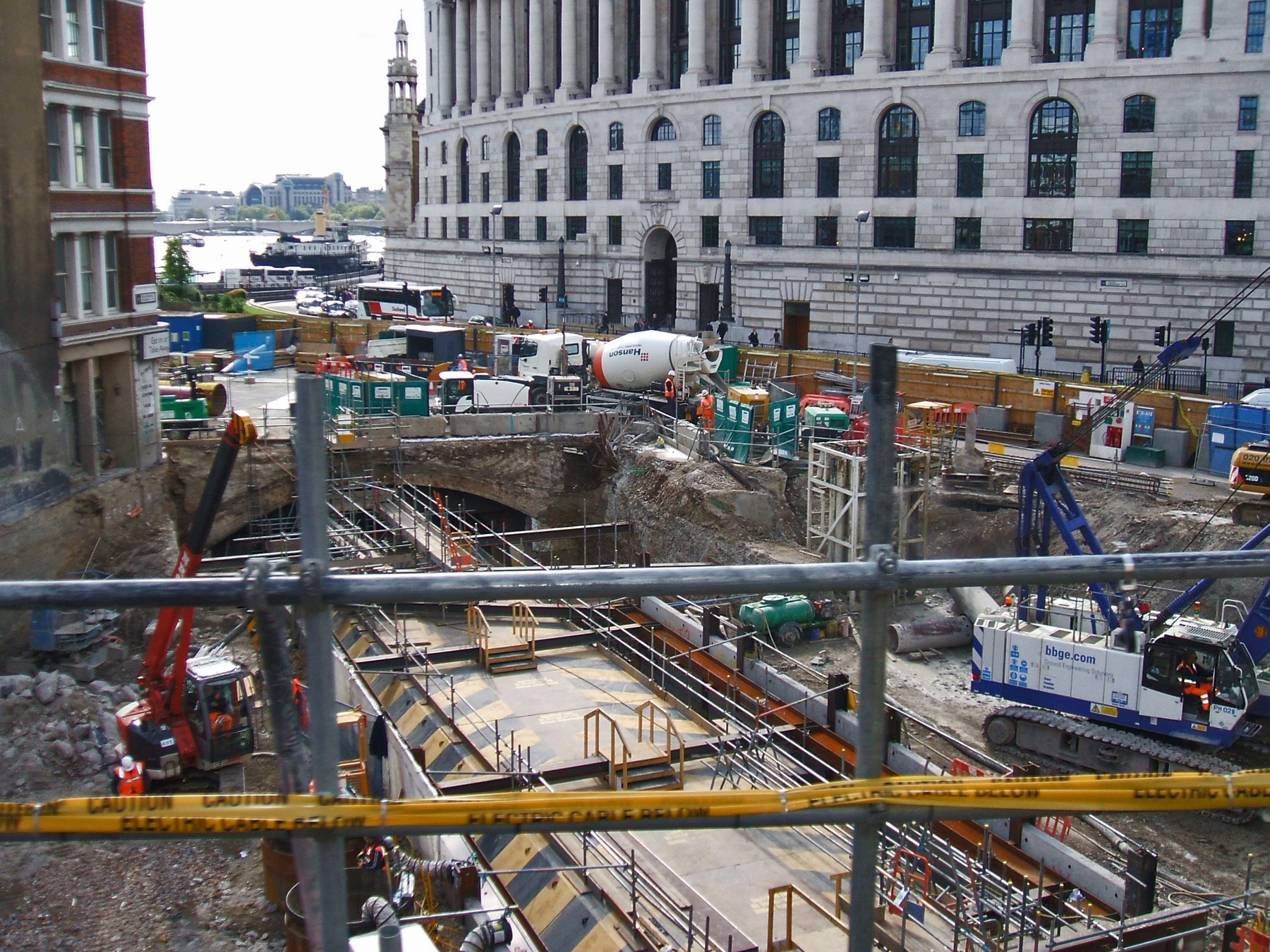
- Building works at Blackfriars station (Circle & District lines)
- Location: South-East England
- Groundbreaking: 2009
- Opening: 18 September 2020
- Website: www.thameslinkprogramme.co.uk

Companies
- Contractor: Network Rail
- Manager: Department for Transport

Technical details
- Cost: £6.5 billion
- Proposed: 1997

The Thameslink Programme, originally Thameslink 2000, was a £6 billion project in south-east England to upgrade and expand the Thameslink rail network to provide new and longer trains between a wider range of stations to the north and to the south of London. The development facilitated new cross-London journeys, which means that fewer passengers have to change trains in London. Work included platform lengthening, station remodelling, new railway infrastructure, and new rolling stock. The project was originally proposed in 1991 following the successful introduction of the initial Thameslink service in 1988. After many delays, planning permission was granted in 2006 and funding was approved in October 2007. Work started in 2009 and was completed on 18 September 2020, although trains over the new routes began running in 2018.

== Planning ==
=== Background ===
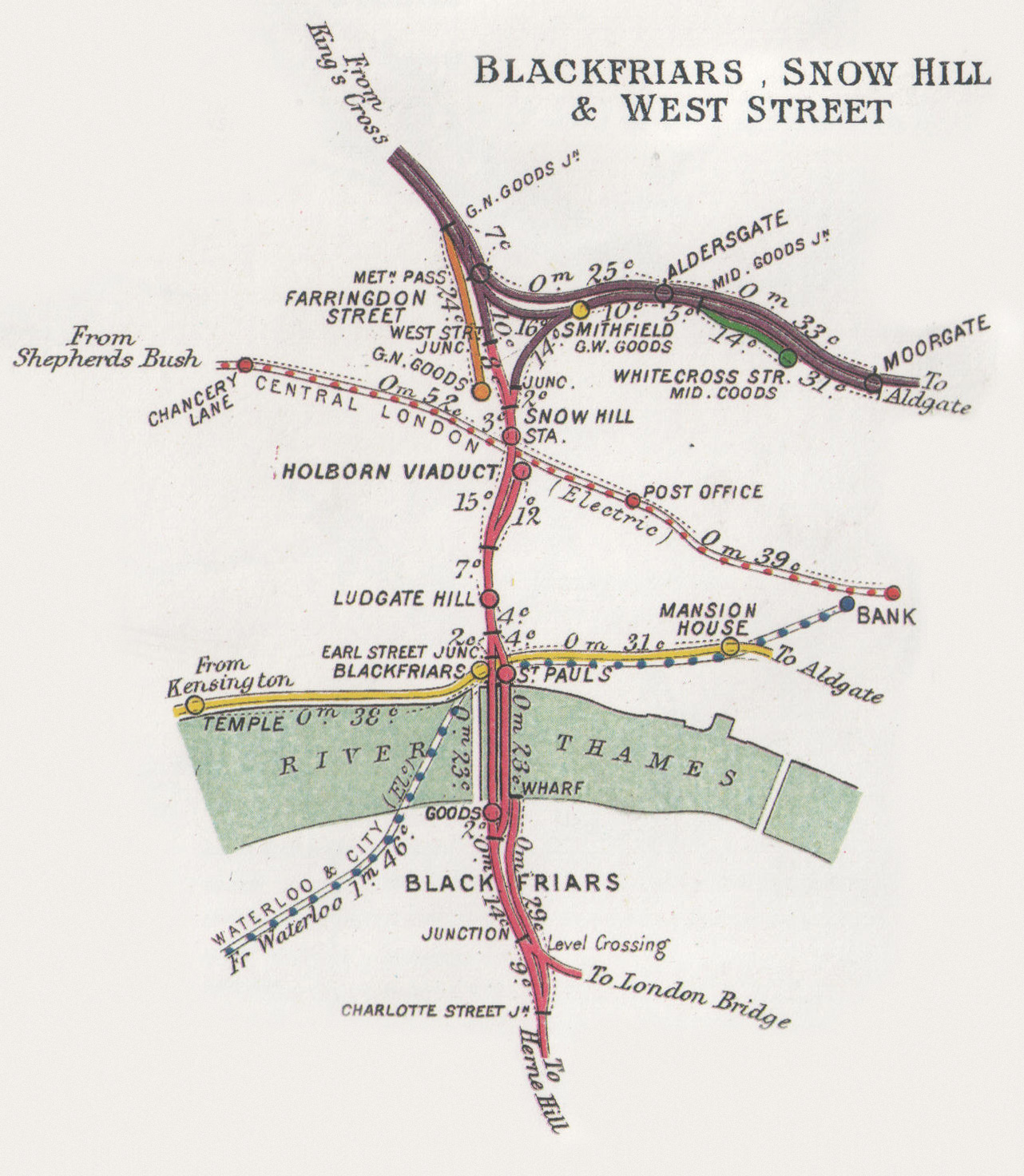
The railway junctions at Blackfriars and Snow Hill in 1914

The original Thameslink rail network was created by joining the electrified network south of the Thames with the then recently electrified line between Bedford and St Pancras to the north via the Snow Hill tunnel, allowing passengers to travel between stations to the north and south of London, including Bedford, Luton Airport, Gatwick Airport and Brighton, without changing trains or using the London Underground. New dual-voltage rolling stock was built for the service on account of differing electrification standards north and south of London; lines south of the river are electrified using a 750-volt DC third rail and those to the north by the more modern 25 kV AC overhead system. Services began in 1988 and the route was fully inaugurated in May 1990.

Passenger traffic between destinations in north and south London served by Thameslink services quadrupled after the first year of operation. The success of this initial project encouraged British Rail to develop proposals to extend the network, and increase the frequency of service.

=== British Rail 'Thameslink 2000' plans ===
British Rail proposed to expand and upgrade the original network in the early 1990s, with plans to increase the number of stations served from 50 to 169 and to increase passenger capacity by allowing 12-carriage trains and allowing more trains per hour. In 1994 responsibility for the project, intended to be complete by 2000, was transferred to Railtrack as detailed in the Railways Act 1993. This privatisation, combined with a recession in the UK economy, caused the first of many delays to the project.

=== Railtrack plans ===
Railtrack applied for Transport and Works Act 1992 powers on 21 November 1997, but two months later London and Continental Railways (LCR), a company created to build the High Speed 1 railway between London and the Channel tunnel, announced that it would require a further direct government grant of £1.2 billion (1995 prices) to finance the rail link; and the Thameslink Programme relied on the construction of a 'concrete box' provided by this other project to house the new Thameslink sub-surface station underneath St Pancras. The Government and LCR did however reach agreement in June 1998 allowing the construction of High Speed 1 and also the associated works required for the Thameslink programme to proceed.

During this period Railtrack carried out an extensive public consultation exercise, which resulted in the revision of the original proposals; it then submitted a Supplementary Order on 29 September 1999.

=== First public inquiry ===
Given the size of the project, the Deputy Prime Minister decided to call for a public inquiry, which began in June 2000 and closed in May 2001. The Inspector spent several months compiling a report on the proposals submitted by Railtrack and the feedback provided by various parties for and against the project before submitting the report to the Government. On 30 July 2002, the Office of the Deputy Prime Minister published the Inspector's report, which stated that although there was a strong case for the project, the Inspector did not recommend that the project should be given approval as there were three 'deficiencies' that he was not satisfied with:

- The poor quality proposals for the redevelopment of London Bridge station;
- The lack of proposals for a building above the Blackfriars station concourse (which would have left a 'missing tooth' in London's northern riverside);
- The lack of proposals for the replacement of decorative listed buildings in Borough (which includes Borough Market).

=== Revision of plans ===
As a result, the Deputy Prime Minister said in January 2003 that the project would not receive approval and that Network Rail (which had replaced Railtrack by this time) must submit improved proposals and a new Environmental Statement.

Network Rail revised the original proposal and submitted it along with an updated Environmental Statement dated 14 June 2004. The Deputy Prime Minister and the Secretary of State for Transport called for a new public inquiry to begin in September 2005. During this period the Strategic Rail Authority was abolished by the Railways Act of 2005, and the Department for Transport (DfT) took over funding responsibility for the project in July 2005.

=== Second public inquiry ===
The second public inquiry took place between September and December 2005, and the Inspector completed the report in February 2006, submitted to the DfT for consideration. In October 2006 the DfT published the second report, declaring that the Inspector was satisfied that the deficiencies of the previous proposals had been resolved, and recommending that the project be approved.

=== Project approval ===
In conjunction with the second report, the Secretaries of State for Transport and 'Communities & Local Government' consequently granted Network Rail the planning permission and legal powers required to execute the project, and the Order (officially described as The Network Rail (Thameslink 2000) Order 2006) came into force on 13 December 2006; furthermore, on 19 December 2006, the Parliamentary Under-Secretary of State for Transport announced that the DfT would grant Network Rail £30 million to 'enable a more informed decision to be made regarding the case for funding the implementation of the project in summer 2007'.

On 24 July 2007, the Secretary of State for Transport, Ruth Kelly, formally announced that the Government was fully committed to funding the Thameslink Programme. Since the planning permission and legal powers associated with the project had already been granted, the project was now clear to proceed.

With the downturn in the economy there was some doubt that phase 2 of the project would be completed in its entirety, but on 25 November 2010 the Secretary of State for Transport (Philip Hammond) confirmed that no cutbacks would be made. However, project completion would be delayed until 2018 as the schedule was already difficult to achieve and because cost savings could be made if the level of concurrent activity was reduced.

== Construction ==
Construction was divided into three stages, each with 'Key outputs'. Key Output 0 was to make service changes to allow other work to proceed. Key Output 1 is for work that had to be completed before the 2012 Olympics. Work for Key Output 2 started after the London Olympics, with a planned completion date of summer 2018. Trains began running in March 2018 although all works for Key Output 2 were not finally completed until 2020.

=== Key Output 0 (completed March 2009) ===
The first stage, completed on 22 March 2009, was to introduce service changes to allow the major work to take place. The terminal platforms at Blackfriars were closed, as was the Farringdon to Moorgate branch line. A 15 trains per hour (tph) peak-hour service was introduced on the core section between St. Pancras and Blackfriars. A new footbridge was built at Farringdon to improve interchange with London Underground's Circle line. A temporary entrance (now removed) was created at Blackfriars station.

This involved signalling works and alterations to the tracks and overhead line equipment between Farringdon and City Thameslink to allow the merged services to operate. Trains from the south that previously terminated at Blackfriars now terminated at Kentish Town or further north, and 23 dual-voltage Class 377/5 Electrostars were procured to meet the additional rolling stock requirements.

=== Key Output 1 (completed 2012) ===
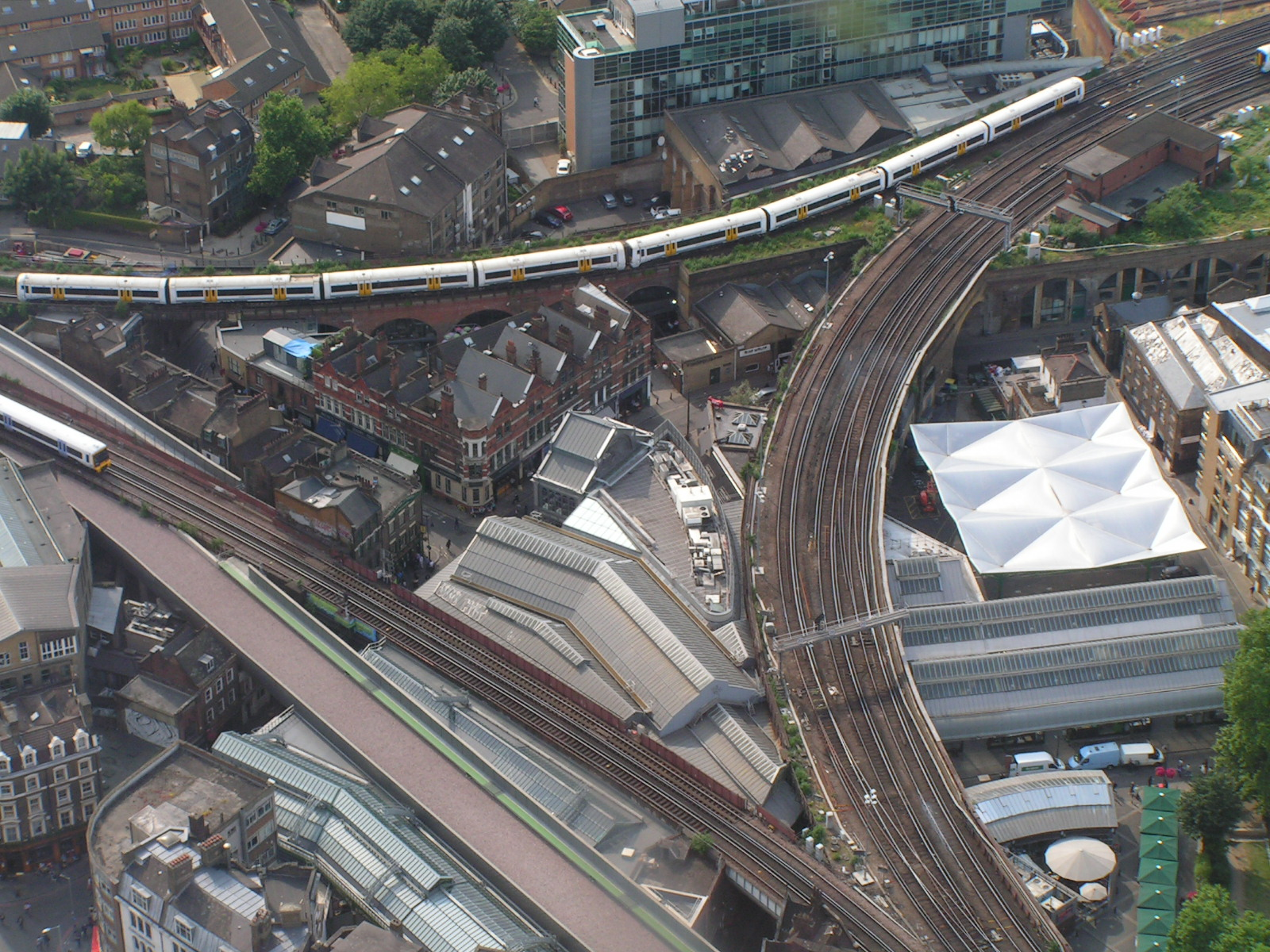
Borough Market junction. The new viaduct before the rails were laid is on the lower left

All aspects of Key Output stage 1 were completed by mid-2012, in time for the London Olympics. A major objective of this phase was to enable 12-carriage trains to run on the Bedford-Brighton route. Work affecting this was completed in time for the December 2011 timetable change, when 10,000 extra peak-period seats were provided. By then, 23 stations between Bedford and Brighton had been extended to accommodate the longer trains; in addition, Farringdon and Blackfriars stations had been rebuilt to take 12-car trains and allow for increased passenger flows. Works at Farringdon also allowed for the east–west Crossrail route (which opened as the Elizabeth line in May 2022), while Blackfriars gained a new entrance on the south bank of the Thames. Platforms at Hendon, Cricklewood, and Kentish Town stations were not, and will not be, extended. Those from Elephant & Castle southwards on the Thameslink suburban (Wimbledon/Sutton) loop, and on the Catford loop line towards Sevenoaks, will likewise remain 8-car stations.

A new viaduct was built over Borough Market and Borough High Street to provide trains to Blackfriars and to Charing Cross with their own dedicated routes, and hence allow increased capacity through central London. Though completed in 2012, this only came into use (as scheduled) in January 2016.

The fly-down at Tanners Hill near Lewisham was widened and made double-track.

=== Key Output 2 (completed September 2020) ===
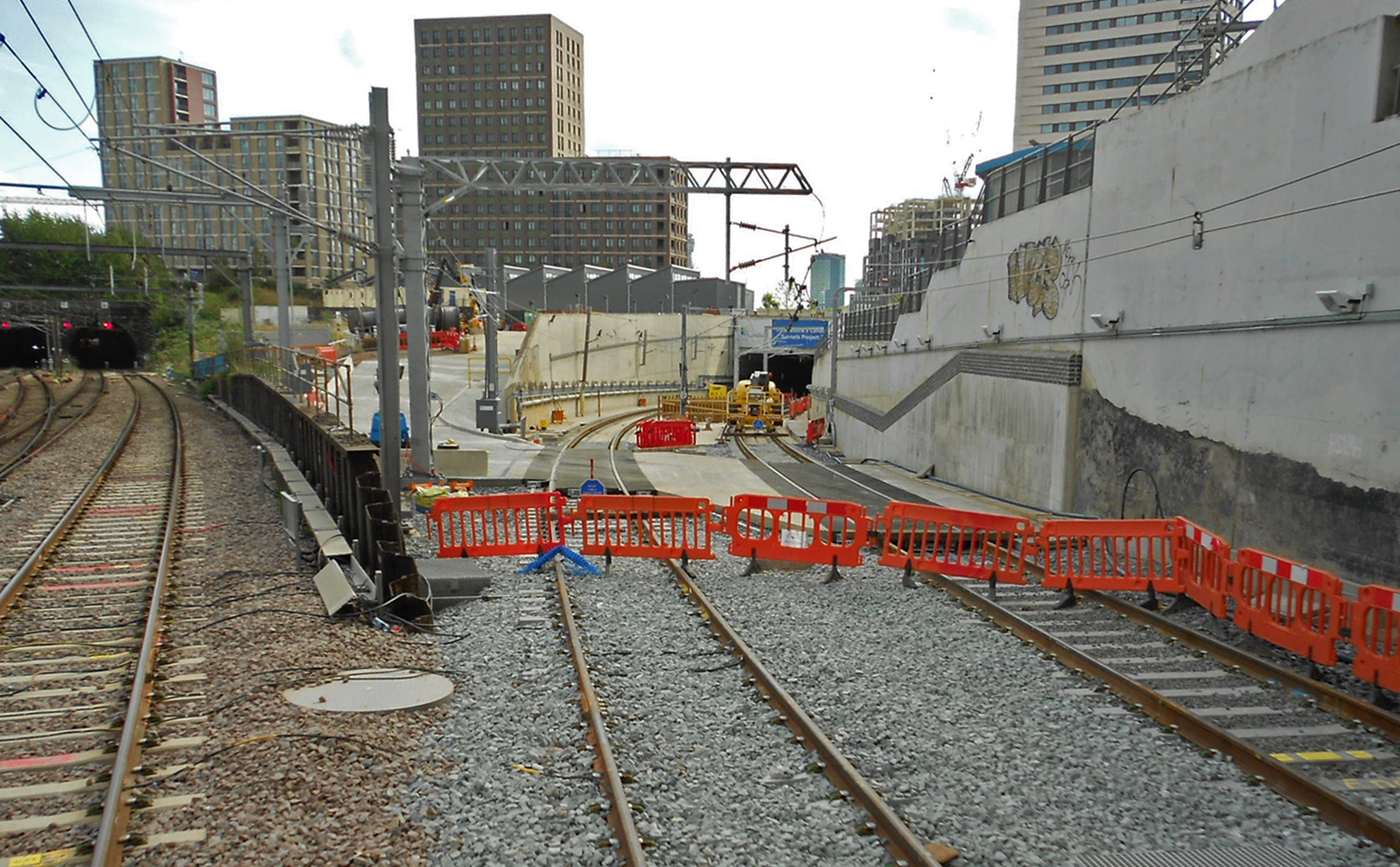
The Canal Tunnels' northern entrance at Belle Isle Junction

Until summer 2018 there were major track, signalling and station remodelling works at London Bridge station as part of the Masterplan project (some works within the station building started during Key Output 1). A grade-separated junction was created at Bermondsey. New permanent way (track level, in this case including both plain rail and junctions) and overhead line equipment were laid out in the new Canal Tunnels just north of St Pancras between the Thameslink route and the East Coast Main Line, opening up the Thameslink network to new destinations north of London. An overhead conductor rail replaced the traditional Mk3b solid wire between the former King's Cross Thameslink station to St Pancras International station.

In July 2020, the consolidation of signalling across the region into a new Railway Operating Centre at Three Bridges was completed, with the closure of the 1970s London Bridge Area Signalling Centre.

On completion of the project, the Thameslink network is now able to handle a nominal peak-period frequency of 24 trains per hour (equivalent to 1 train every 2 minutes and 30 seconds) through the central core between St Pancras and Blackfriars, providing an extra 14,500 peak-period seats compared to the level of service in 2008.

As part of the project, a purpose-built fleet of 55 12-car and 60 8-car Class 700 trains (equivalent to 1,140 carriages) is now operating across the network (see the "Rolling stock" section below). The procurement process started in April 2008 and the first train entered service in June 2016. To meet the power requirements of this new fleet, electricity-supply enhancement works were carried out, creating 11 new feeder stations/sub-stations, upgrading a further 21 and converting 9 from track sectioning/paralleling equipment; in addition, new track sectioning/paralleling equipment is being installed in 9 locations and upgraded in a further 4.

== Major station works ==
=== Blackfriars station ===
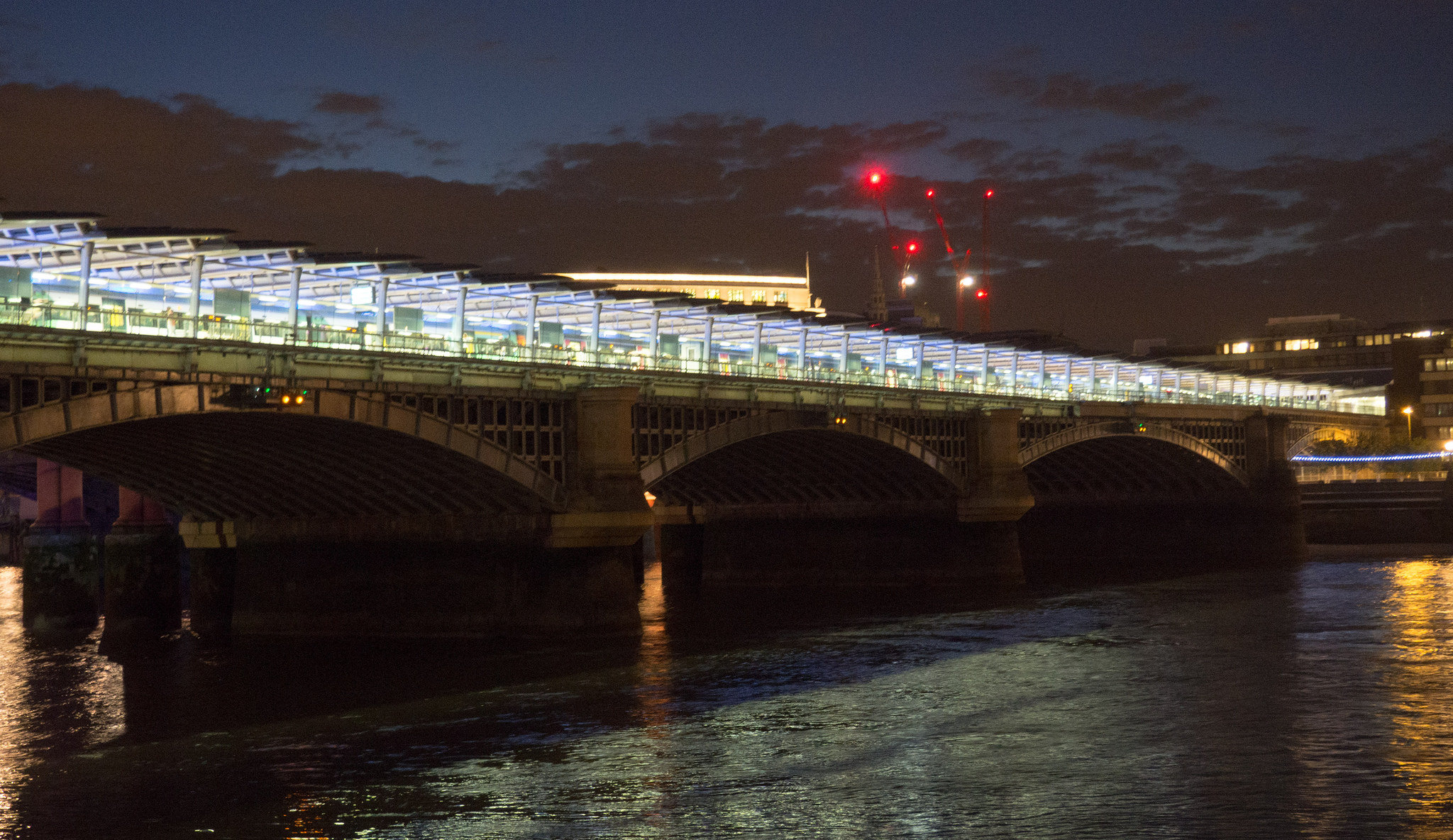
Blackfriars station from the Thames following its renovation

Blackfriars station has been rebuilt to accommodate 12-car trains and to make many other improvements to both the main line and underground stations at the cost of losing one bay road platform. The mainline station remained open during most of this work. The Underground station was closed for almost three years; it reopened on 20 February 2012.

The through platforms have been extended along Blackfriars Railway Bridge over the River Thames, and the platform layout altered to avoid the need for trains between City Thameslink and London Bridge to cross the lines giving access to the terminus platforms. The new station houses a new shared National Rail/LUL ticket hall and LUL ventilation shaft together with new escalators and lifts between a mezzanine level for National Rail services and the sub-surface level for London Underground services. A new station entrance has been created on Bankside, with a second ticket hall. It opened on 5 December 2011.

=== City Thameslink station ===
City Thameslink station has been upgraded to enable 12-car trains to call. The platforms themselves were already long enough, but it was necessary to add extra train despatch equipment (CD/RA indicators) and replace and enhance the CIS (Customer Information Screens) so that information is displayed in a standard format across the central section. New lighting and an additional ticket gate have also been installed. The work was completed in October 2010. Also, as part of Key Output 0, 25 kV AC overhead lines were installed. Northbound trains change from third rail to overhead power here – any trains which cannot do so due to a fault can terminate here and use the adjacent sidings at Smithfield; southbound trains change to third rail power at nearby Farringdon Station but can run into the southbound platform at City Thameslink on AC power if an on-train fault results in the DC collector equipment being faulty – trains can then return north from the southbound platform at City Thameslink back towards Farringdon.

=== Farringdon station ===
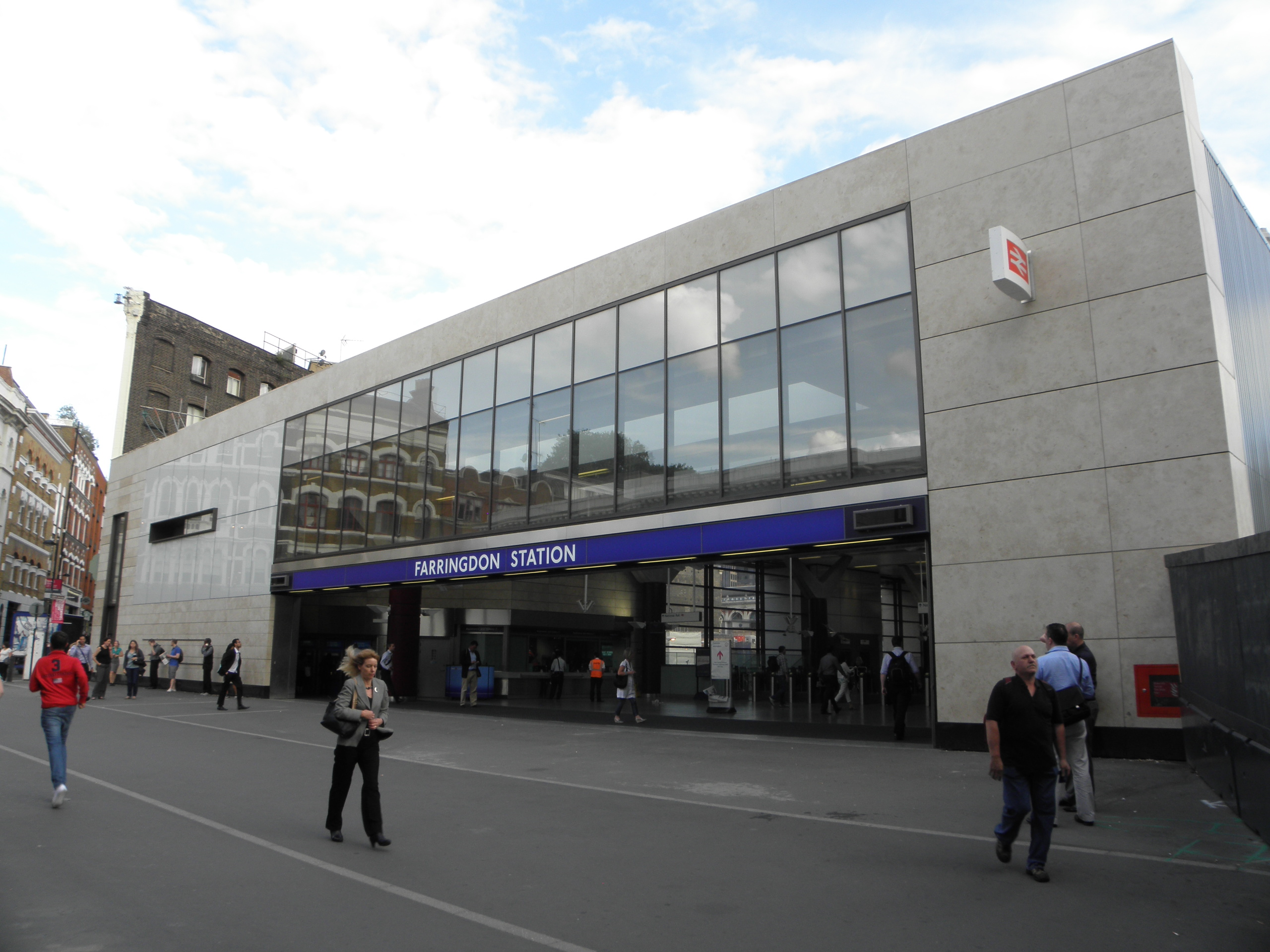
The new National Rail entrance at Farringdon, built as part of the Thameslink programme

Works began in 2009 to remodel Farringdon station to accommodate longer Thameslink trains and make other improvements. Platforms were lengthened and a new roof canopy covering the north end of all four platforms was provided, together with a permanent new entrance and concourse facing Turnmill Street. Platforms were widened to accommodate increased patronage.

It was necessary to build the Thameslink platform extensions to the south, since there is a sharp gradient to the immediate north of the station. This resulted in the two-station branch to Moorgate being permanently closed.

=== St Pancras International station ===
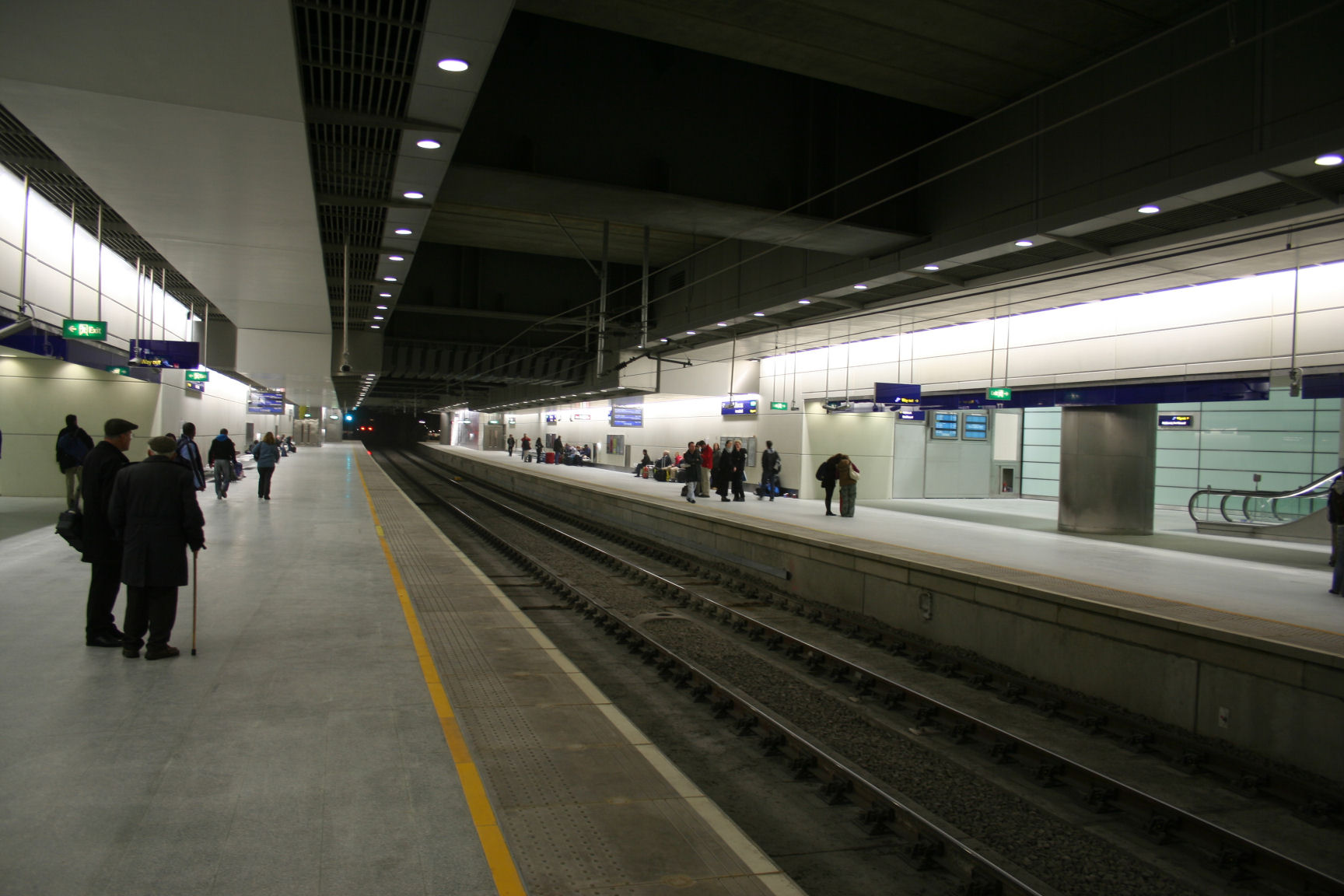
The new St Pancras International Thameslink station platforms

Two new low-level platforms at St Pancras International which accept 12-carriage trains replaced the old King's Cross Thameslink station and opened on 9 December 2007. It allows for better interchange with other forms of transport; it has seven escalators, and also two lifts to allow people with impaired mobility to use the station; and it is covered by CCTV. 'Fit-out' works began in summer 2006 (following the decision by the DfT to provide a further £60–65 million for the High Speed 1 project).

=== King's Cross Thameslink station ===
King's Cross Thameslink station closed in 2007 with trains calling instead at St Pancras International using the new low-level platforms at the north end of that station. The Pentonville Road entrance of the old King's Cross Thameslink station remained open to provide pedestrian access to King's Cross St. Pancras tube station between 07:00 and 20:00 Mondays to Fridays until its closure on 23 March 2020 in response to the COVID-19 pandemic. Transport for London confirmed that there were no plans to reopen the entrance due to staffing and renovation costs.

=== London Bridge station ===
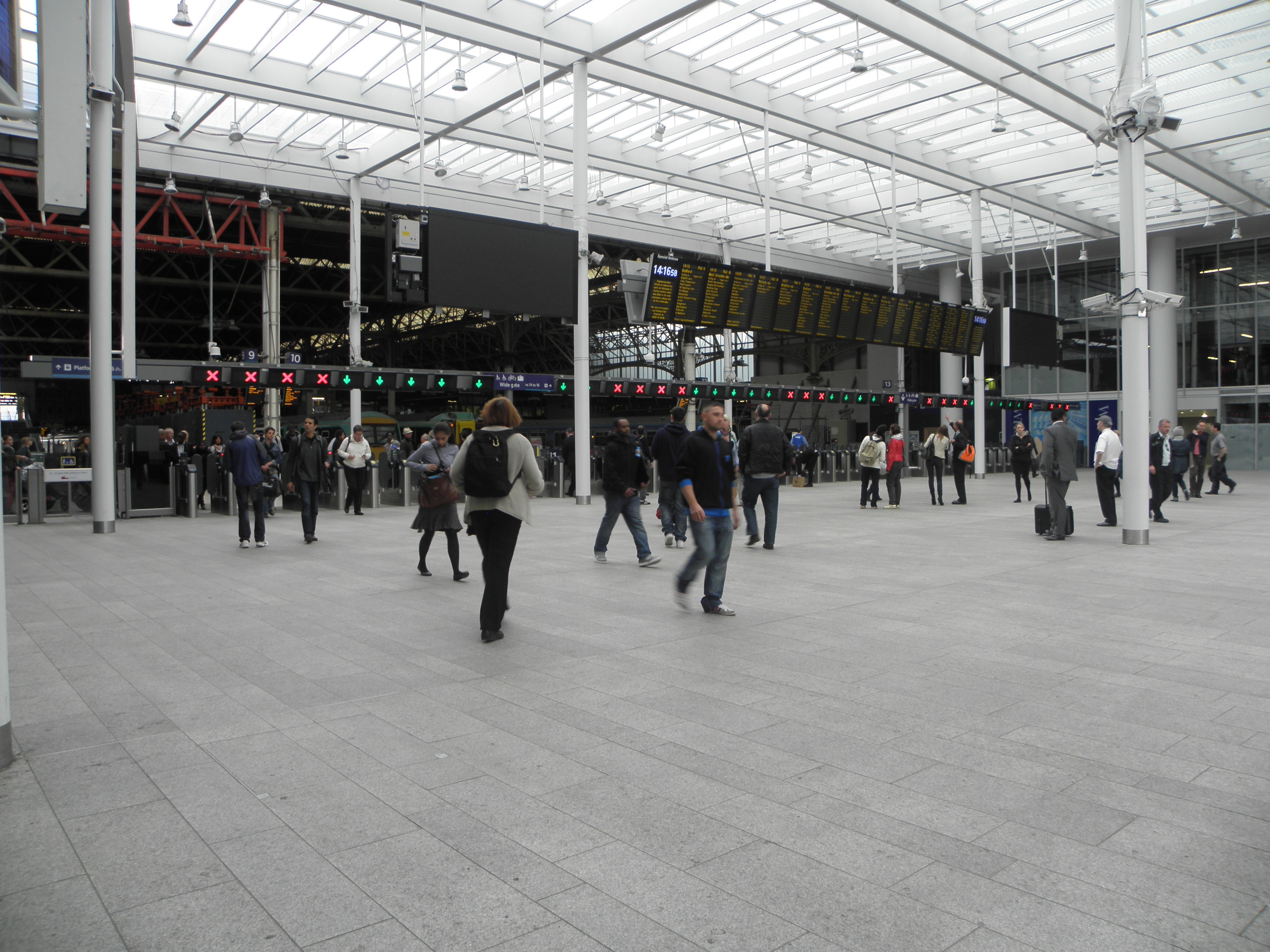
The new concourse (for terminating trains) at London Bridge station, opened in 2012.

London Bridge station has undergone a major transformation to accommodate Thameslink trains during the peak period and achieve many other benefits. Three terminus platforms and a through track have been closed and three new through platforms created, to allow all services going to Cannon Street and Charing Cross to stop at London Bridge, as well as additional services to Thameslink stations north of the Thames. A new station concourse has been built to improve circulation, and the adjacent bus station expanded. New retail facilities have been built into the existing western arcade, which has been re-opened and extended to link the Underground station and Joiner Street.

As shown in the timetable from 13 December 2008, capacity constraints meant that through London Bridge there were no northbound Thameslink trains in the morning peak between 07:24 and 09:09, and no southbound Thameslink trains in the evening peak between 16:43 and 18:27. During these times, Brighton line Thameslink trains ran via Herne Hill instead. The work was designed in part to remedy this situation and improve the flow not only of Thameslink services but also of all Southeastern commuter services from Kent into Charing Cross and Cannon Street.

Work started in 2013 and was completed in 2018. From 5 January 2015 until 20 May 2018, all Thameslink through trains were diverted via Herne Hill and did not call at London Bridge. Thameslink services remained in operation from London Bridge to Brighton via Gatwick Airport with 2 trains per hour.

=== Other stations ===
Work has been carried out at a number of stations north of the Thames to extend the platforms to accommodate 12-car trains. These vary from quite major works such as at Luton, where new bridges had to be installed, Cambridge, where two new island platforms were built, and West Hampstead, where a new station footbridge has been built, to relatively straightforward platform extensions.

== Other major works ==
=== Borough Market Viaduct ===
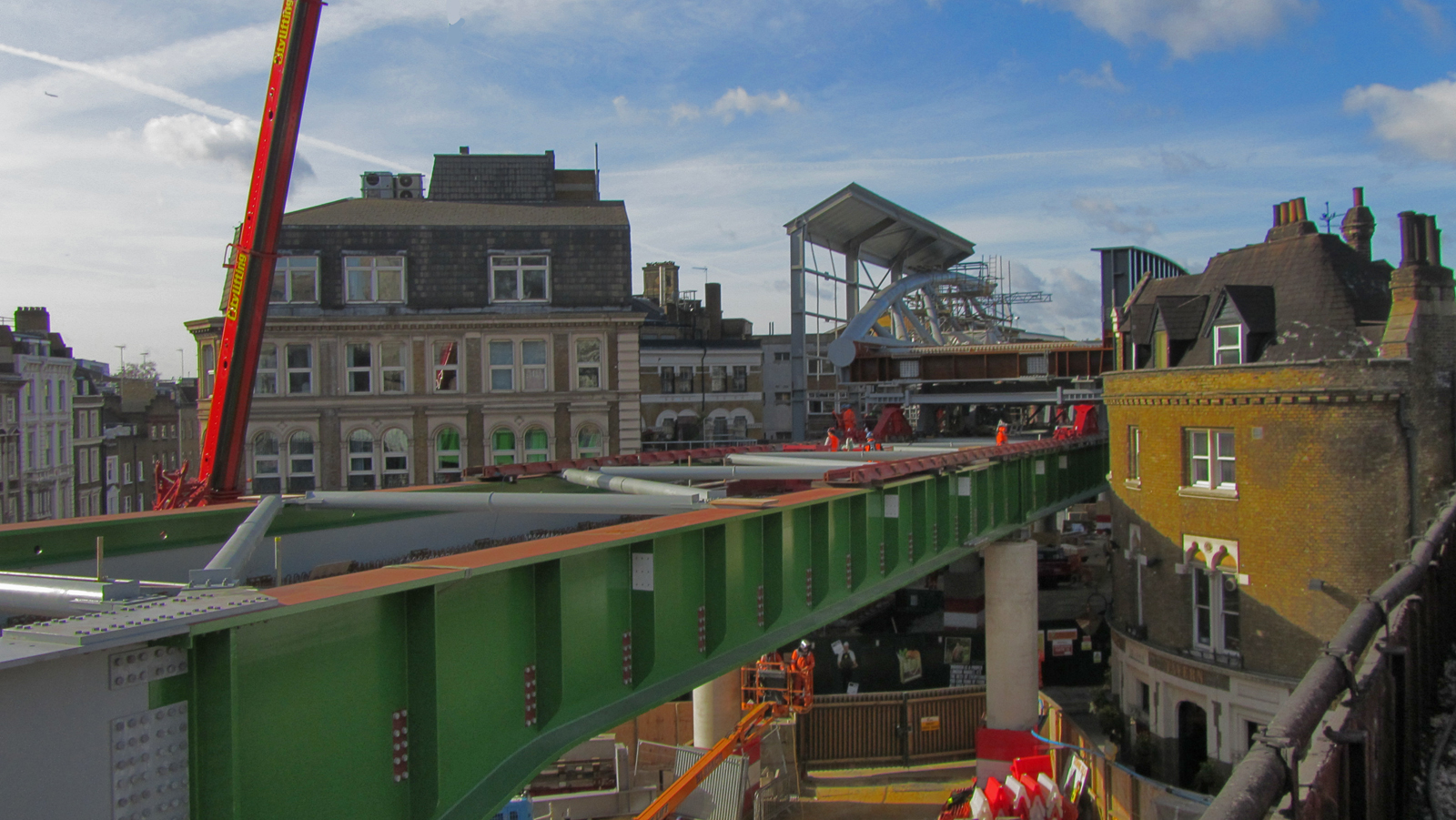
First span of the new Borough Market viaduct at Bedale Street

Between London Bridge and the vicinity of Stoney Street and Bedale Street, an extra pair of tracks was built on a new viaduct to the south of the existing one. Widening of the existing viaduct west of Stoney Street was to the north to avoid affecting the Hop Exchange building to the south.

The new, southern pair of tracks is used by trains to and from Charing Cross. Thameslink trains have a dedicated route to Blackfriars on the northern pair of tracks, which is key to providing the nominal peak-hour frequency of 24tph on the core route.

This work required the demolition of 20 Grade II listed buildings and many other buildings within Borough Market, which is part of Borough High Street Conservation Area, and the original Thameslink programme was rejected at public inquiry partly on the grounds that suitable arrangements were not included to replace the buildings to be demolished within the market. A revised proposal involving remedial work to the market was accepted at a second public inquiry. By January 2009 businesses in the path of the new viaduct were closing down or relocating in preparation for demolition work, and the first section of the new viaduct was installed over the weekend of 10 October 2010. These works had been brought forward to fit in with other, non-railway, developments in the Borough High Street area; the viaduct only came into use in January 2016 as part of the Key Output 2 stageworks when the Charing Cross services started passing through new platforms on the south side of London Bridge High Level Station.

=== Bermondsey dive-under ===
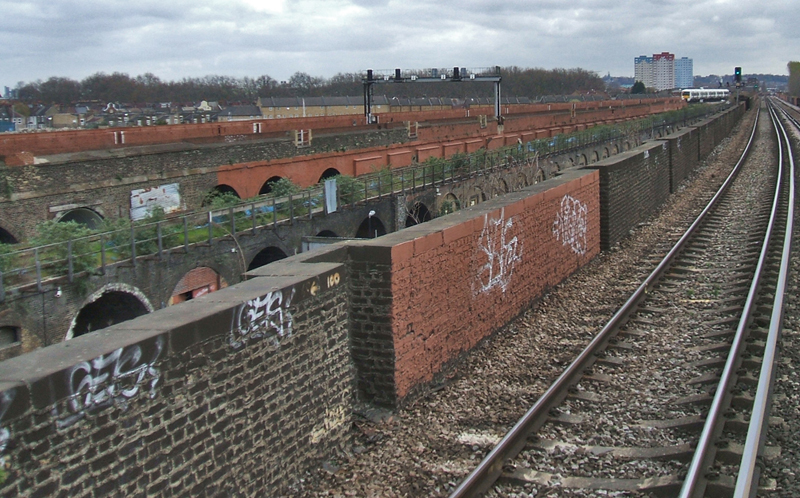
The overgrown spur line to the Bricklayers' Arms branch

With the completion of Borough Market Viaduct to the west of London Bridge, Thameslink trains use the pair of tracks to the north, and Charing Cross trains use the new pair of tracks to the south. Previously, northbound Thameslink trains arrived into London Bridge to the south of the Kent lines. Construction work was undertaken to the east of London Bridge so that Thameslink trains from the Brighton Main Line now use a grade-separated crossover to avoid impeding trains from Kent bound for Charing Cross.

Services to Charing Cross on the Kent lines were diverted slightly south in the vicinity of Trundleys Road onto the route of the former branch line to Bricklayers' Arms. They then slope up alongside the Brighton Main Line just north of South Bermondsey station. Thameslink trains in both directions now cross over the Kent lines on a new bridge, meeting the existing alignment just north of Jarrow Road.

Work commenced during 2013, with bridge-strengthening works near London Bridge station completed in June 2013. The first track was used for services from 27 December 2016, two new lines for Southeastern traffic came into service after the August bank holiday and the overall programme of work was expected to be completed in January 2018.

=== Canal Tunnels ===
The Canal Tunnels were constructed between 2004 and 2006, as part of the High Speed 1 redevelopment of St Pancras station. Passing under the Regents Canal, the tunnels connect the East Coast Main Line near Kings Cross to the Thameslink route, with services from Cambridge and Peterborough that started in February 2018. There will be eight trains an hour over this route at peak times.

=== Farringdon to Moorgate ===
The Farringdon to Moorgate branch was permanently closed in March 2009 at the start of the project – the platform extensions at Farringdon blocked access to the tracks leading to this branch. Passengers for Barbican or Moorgate now have to change at Farringdon and use the Elizabeth line or the London Underground.

=== Tanners Hill fly-down ===
To improve capacity on the line between London Bridge and Lewisham, a new stretch of single track has been built alongside the original bi-directional single track between Tanners Hill Junction (near St John's Station) and Lewisham Vale Junction. Before the new track was laid, St John's Vale Road Bridge was partially demolished and reconstructed with a concrete pier, as well as a new south span over the new track; the existing embankment along the fly-down was also widened. This work was completed in April 2013, and the new track is being used for some services to/from Charing Cross via Lewisham.

=== Other infrastructure works ===
The OHLE (overhead line equipment) system has been extended from Farringdon to City Thameslink and was commissioned in December 2009, Combined with a new crossover in Snow Hill tunnel between the two stations, this allows southbound trains to be turned back should they fail to change from AC overhead line traction current to DC third rail. The crossover previously located within City Thameslink station which enabled trains from Smithfield sidings to enter platform 2 was removed as Blackfriars station was rebuilt.

This also allows trains to change from DC to AC power northbound at City Thameslink – and for access into Smithfield Sidings for northbound trains should AC power be unavailable for any reason.

Between City Thameslink and Blackfriars, a large electrical substation has been built at Ludgate Cellars. This 20 MW substation is the largest on the 750 V DC third-rail network.

== Provisional timetable ==
In 2011 a provisional timetable was released for Thameslink services in the London and South East Route Utilisation Strategy. It confirmed that Sutton loop services were to be curtailed at Blackfriars, but this decision was subsequently reversed by government. A new proposed timetable was released with the announcement of the Thameslink, Southern & Great Northern franchise winner in May 2014. As part of consultations, the proposed timetable received further tweaks in September 2016 and June 2017:

Regional Routes
No.	Northern terminus		Central London	Southern terminus		Length	Times (core)
1	Bedford	semi-fast	via London Bridge	Brighton	fast	12-car	All day
2	Bedford	semi-fast	via London Bridge	Brighton	fast	12-car	All day
3	Bedford	semi-fast	via London Bridge	Gatwick Airport (via Redhill)	semi-fast	12-car	All day
4	Bedford	semi-fast	via London Bridge	Gatwick Airport (via Redhill)	semi-fast	12-car	All day
5	Peterborough	semi-fast	via London Bridge	Horsham (via Redhill)	semi-fast	12-car	All day (Note: Hourly on Sundays.)
6	Peterborough	semi-fast	via London Bridge	Horsham (via Redhill)	semi-fast	12-car	All day
7	Cambridge	semi-fast	via London Bridge	Brighton	fast	12-car	All day
8	Cambridge	semi-fast	via London Bridge	Brighton	fast	12-car	All day
9	Cambridge	stopping	via London Bridge	Ashford International (peak only); Maidstone East (off-peak)	semi-fast	8-car	All day (Note: On Sundays, service will run hourly between Cambridge and Kings Cross only; it will not run through the core section or on to Maidstone.)
10	Cambridge	stopping	via London Bridge	Ashford International (peak only); Maidstone East (off-peak)	semi-fast	8-car	All day
11	Bedford	fast	via London Bridge	East Grinstead	stopping	12-car	Peak only
12	Bedford	fast	via London Bridge	East Grinstead	stopping	12-car	Peak only
13	Bedford	fast	via London Bridge	Littlehampton (via Hove)	fast	12-car	Peak only
14	Bedford	fast	via London Bridge	Littlehampton (via Hove)	fast	12-car	Peak only
Commuter Routes
No.	Northern terminus		Central London	Southern terminus		Length	Times
15	Luton	all stations (Note: Except for Kentish Town, Cricklewood and Hendon.)	via London Bridge	Rainham (via Greenwich)	all stations (Note: Except for Woolwich Dockyard, Belvedere and Erith.)	8-car	All day
16	Luton	all stations	via London Bridge	Rainham (via Greenwich)	all stations	8-car	All day
17	St Albans City	all stations	via Elephant & Castle	Sutton (via Mitcham Junction)	all stations	8-car	All day
18	St Albans City	all stations	via Elephant & Castle	Sutton (via Mitcham Junction)	all stations	8-car	All day
19	St Albans City	all stations	via Elephant & Castle	Sutton (via Wimbledon)	all stations	8-car	All day
20	St Albans City	all stations	via Elephant & Castle	Sutton (via Wimbledon)	all stations	8-car	All day
21	Luton (peak only); Kentish Town (off-peak)	all stations	via Elephant & Castle	Orpington (via Catford)	all stations	8-car	All day (Note: No service on Sundays.)
22	Luton (peak only); Kentish Town (off-peak)	all stations	via Elephant & Castle	Orpington (via Catford)	all stations	8-car	All day
23	Welwyn Garden City (peak only); London Blackfriars (off-peak)	stopping	via Elephant & Castle	Sevenoaks (via Catford and Otford)	all stations	8-car	All day (Note: An all-day service will operate between London Blackfriars and Sevenoaks only, with no service through the core outside of peak hours.)
24	Welwyn Garden City (peak only); London Blackfriars (off-peak)	stopping	via Elephant & Castle	Sevenoaks (via Catford and Otford)	all stations	8-car	All day

== Rolling stock ==
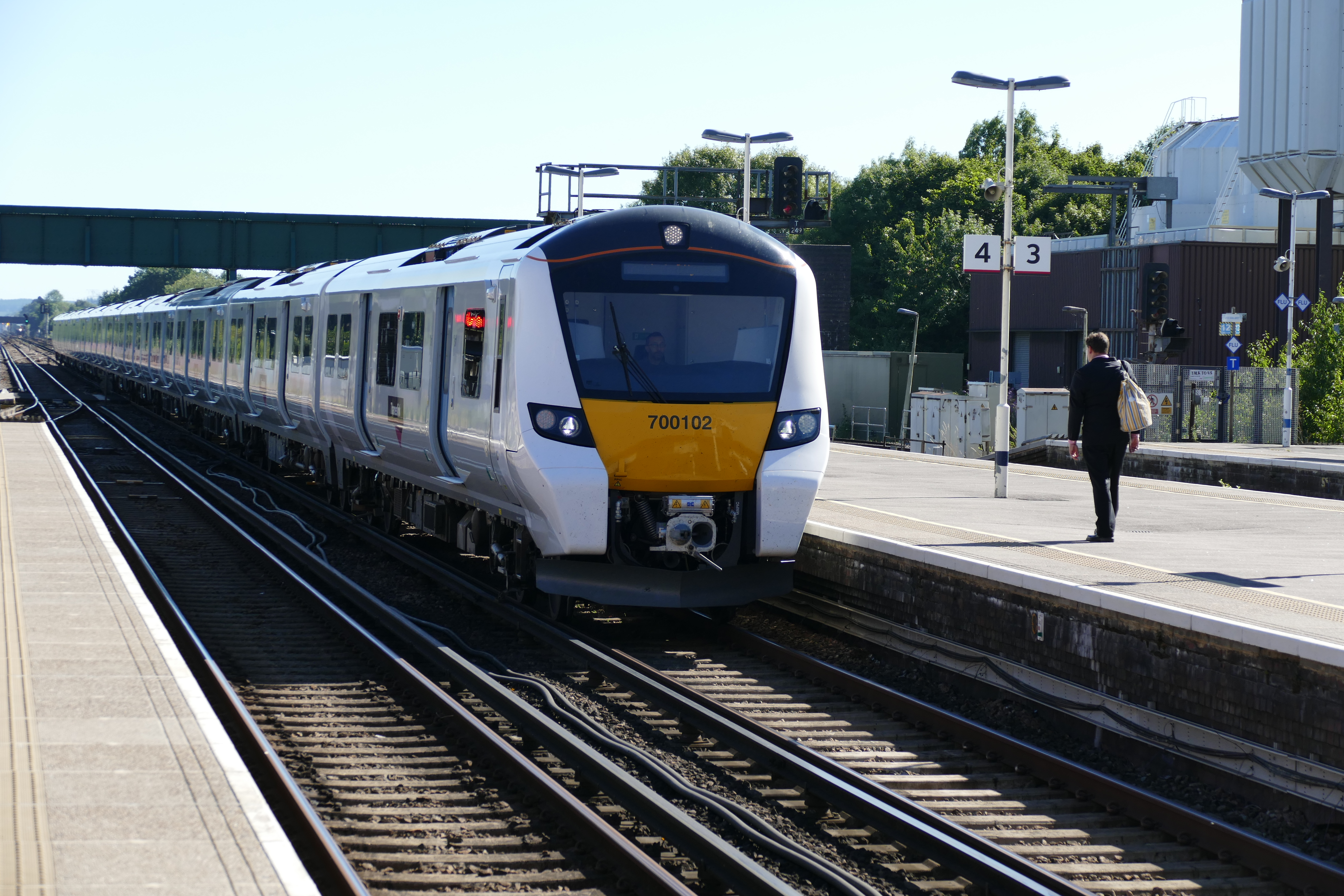
Class 700 at Gatwick Airport in 2016.

In 2009, the Thameslink fleet consisted of 74 dual-voltage Class 319s. While the Thameslink Rolling Stock Project (TRSP) aimed to provide a brand-new fleet, the timescales involved were such that interim solutions were required. On 4 April 2007, the DfT authorised the transfer of twelve Class 319s to Thameslink from Southern, which were not using their dual-voltage capability, so that First Capital Connect then had all 86 Class 319 units. Once project funding was guaranteed, 23 Class 377/5s were sub-leased from Southern to meet the capacity requirements of Key Output 0.

It was announced by First Capital Connect on 4 November 2011 that four services running in each direction on the Thameslink network from 12 December 2011 would be 12-car trains. Class 377/2 trains were hired from Southern to enable the longer trains to operate until enough new rolling stock became available.

The TRSP began in 2008 with the aim of procuring a brand-new fleet of electric trains. A consortium led by Siemens was named preferred bidder for the train contract on 16 June 2011. Maintenance depots for the new trains were being built at Hornsey and Three Bridges. The new trains were designated Class 700 and the first one came into service in June 2016.

Following the introduction of the new rolling stock, some of the Class 319s have been transferred to Northern, allowing them to replace diesel multiple units following the upgrade of certain lines with overhead line equipment. Slightly newer Class 323 units replaced Northern's electric 319s – although several were fitted with diesel engines and reclassified as Class 769.

== Political developments ==
Network Rail had planned to terminate Sutton Loop Thameslink trains at Blackfriars station, rather than have them continue through central London as at present. This would increase the capacity of the central core as the Sutton Loop could only accommodate shorter trains. This upset many residents in South London and their local politicians, who saw it as a reduction in services rather than an improvement. In response to pressure, the government ordered Network Rail to reverse the decision.
