= Canal Tunnels =

Railway tunnels near St Pancras station in London

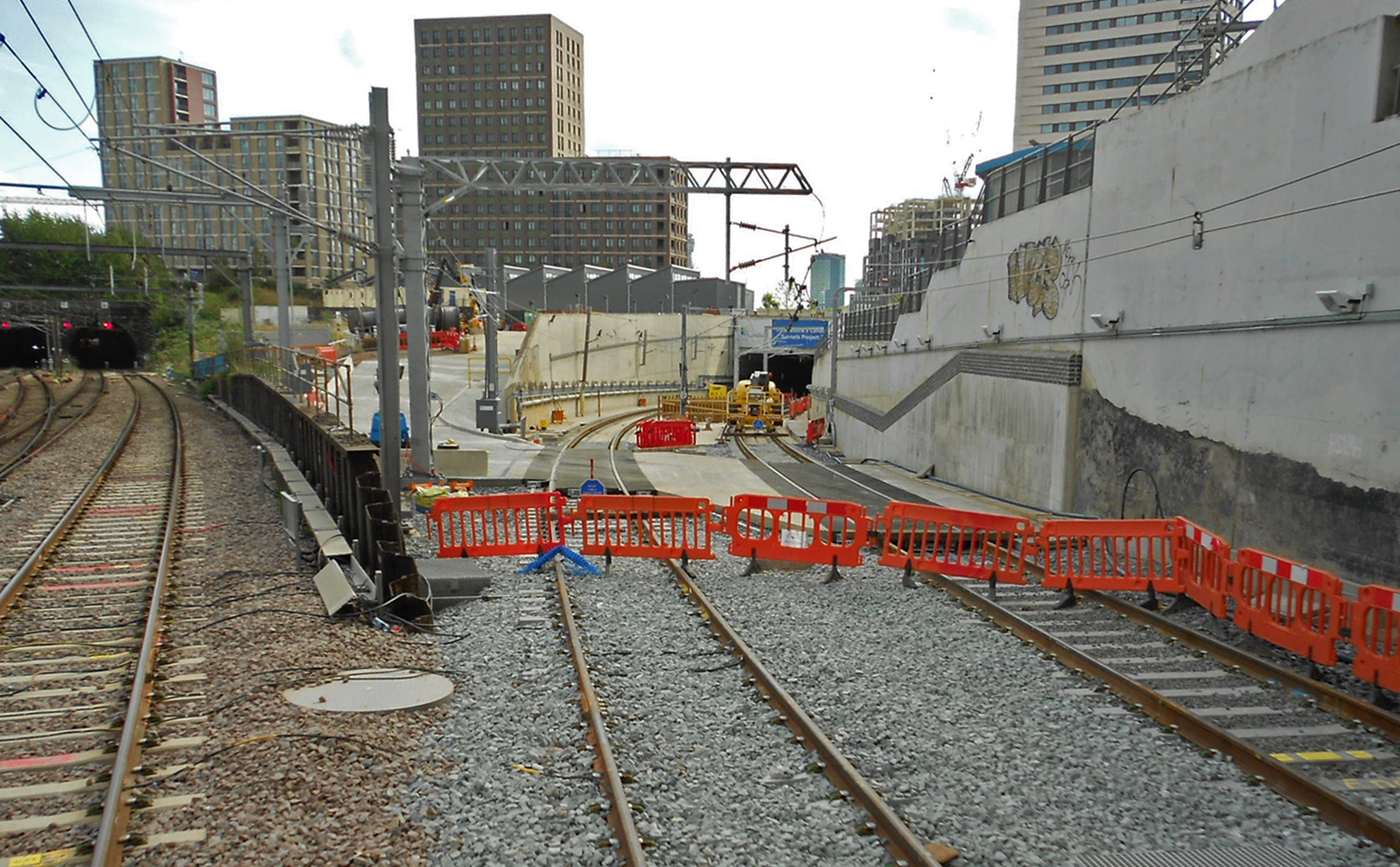
- Canal Tunnels northern entrance at Belle Isle Junction prior to opening
- Interactive map of Canal Tunnels

Overview
- Line: East Coast Main Line
- Coordinates: 51.5395°N 0.1266°W
- OS grid reference: TQ 30404 84602
- Status: Operational
- System: National Rail
- Start: Belle Isle Junction, East Coast Main Line
- End: Canal Junction, Thameslink Core

Operation
- Constructed: 2004–2006
- Opened: 2018
- Owner: Network Rail
- Operator: Thameslink

Technical
- Design engineer: Tunnels: Halcrow Group; Fitting out: Arup
- Length: 820 m (2,690 ft)
- No. of tracks: 2
- Track gauge: 1,435 mm (4 ft 8 1/2 in)
- Electrified: 25 kV 50 Hz AC
- Width: 6 m (20 ft)

The Canal Tunnels are a pair of single track railway tunnels in north London which connect the East Coast Main Line (ECML) at Belle Isle Junction to the low level platforms at London St Pancras railway station, allowing connection to the Thameslink route. Their name comes from the Regent's Canal, which they pass close beneath, and allow up to eight trains per hour operated by Thameslink to access the Thameslink route from the ECML, significantly increasing capacity on the former. The tunnels also allow Thameslink trains stabled at Hornsey Depot to access the route.

The tunnels were conceived as part of the overarching Thameslink Programme, which aimed to improve capacity, reliability, and utility of the Thameslink route. They reinstated a link between the ECML and Snow Hill tunnel, which connects London north–south that had been severed after the closure of King's Cross York Road in 1977. The tunnels were the first part of the program to be constructed, between 2004 and 2006, but their fitting out did not begin until 2013. The first services ran through the Canal Tunnels during February 2018, while its official opening occurred three months later, and have allowed the theoretical maximum capacity of the Thameslink route to increase by fifty percent from sixteen to twenty-four trains per hour.

== Route layout ==
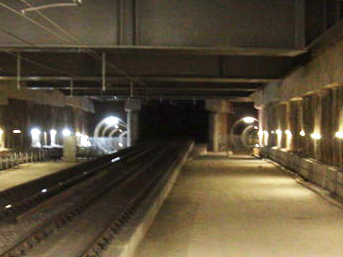
The subsurface platforms at St Pancras in 2008, showing the bores of the Canal Tunnels (outer), yet to be connected to the Moorgate lines (centre).

Approximately 0 miles 63 chains (0.79 miles, 1.27 km) down the line from the divergence of the Canal Tunnel lines, the Holloway flyover carries the Up Slow track over the two fast tracks of the East Coast Main Line (ECML). This converts the ECML from being quadrupled by direction to being quadrupled by speed, (Note: Beforehand, the two fast tracks of the ECML are in the middle of the two slow tracks, so the Canal Tunnel track would have cross three other tracks or use a flyover to get to the tunnel. However, the Holloway Flyover changes this so that the two slow tracks are to the side of the two fast tracks and the junction is a simple flat junction.) which means the Canal Tunnel lines can separate without crossing the fast tracks.

The tracks for the Canal Tunnels then separate from the ECML at Belle Isle Junction, on a flat junction with lines E and F, which change name from Down Slow and Up Slow at this point before entering the Gasworks Tunnel into London King's Cross 0 miles 11 chains (0.14 miles, 0.22 km) later. The diverging tracks for the tunnels are called the Down Canal Tunnel and Up Canal Tunnel tracks, and they have a speed limit of 30 miles per hour (48 km/h), including on the points of Belle Isle Junction.

Having diverged from the ECML, there is then a facing point at the first junction named Canal Tunnel Junction, which is partially submerged in the start of the tunnel. By this point, the tracks are in the 100-metre (330 ft) concrete box that precede entering the tunnels themselves. While in the tunnels, the tracks are configured for bi-directional working for greater operational flexibility.

Immediately after this point is the boundary between the Eastern region and the East Midlands region of Network Rail. The tunnels then pass around 50 feet (15 m) beneath the Regent's Canal. The two tracks then split to allow the Down Moorgate and Up Moorgate lines to come in between from underneath. These lines come from the Midland Main Line (MML) at Kentish Town railway station. (Note: Despite their name, the Up and Down Moorgate lines do not have a link to Moorgate station. They formerly did, but it was removed as part of the Thameslink Programme in order to extend the platforms at Farringdon station.) The two sets of tracks then merge at Canal Tunnels Junction immediately to the north of the subsurface platforms at St Pancras railway station, lettered A and B.

== Tunnel design ==
The two bores of the tunnel each have a diameter of 6 metres (20 ft). It is built from pre-cast concrete segmental rings. The northbound tunnel is 860 m (2,820 ft) long, while the southbound tunnel is 820 m (2,690 ft) long; the disparity is due to curvature. The tunnels have a maximal incline of 1 in 34. Alongside the track, there is a walkway that can be used for maintenance and emergency access. The lifetime of the tunnels is between 50 and 125 years for the different components. The track itself is concrete slab track as opposed to the ballasted track of the ECML; this was chosen partially to reduce noise and vibration produced by trains. The tunnels have a loading gauge of W6A, which is available on the vast majority of the British railway network. The track alignment was laid within a very fine precision of 1–2 millimetres (39–79 thou).

The ancillary infrastructure of the tunnels had to be designed such as way that if there were an issue on either the ECML or MML, the other would not be affected. While power would normally be sourced from the nearby MML, provisions to use the ECML power system were made. For safety reasons, emergency service radio systems have been installed, and automatic LED lighting at four-metre intervals to help passengers in the event of an evacuation. The tunnels were fitted with the new GSM-R radio system as opposed to the old CSR system, which was still in use at the time of the tunnel's fitting out. Because the tunnels pass below the Regent's Canal being above, flood management measures had to be built. In addition, the tunnels were constructed with fire hydrants at regular intervals, which could flood the tunnels if activated. To mitigate these risks, an infiltration basin was added to the bottom of the tunnels to collect water and pump it upwards into the drainage system of the ECML.

In order to integrate the new tunnel, the surrounding track at either end had to be realigned. On the ECML, the access to the North London Incline had to be moved; this track allows bidirectional access from the ECML to the North London line and the High Speed 1 section of St Pancras railway station. In addition, the Moorgate lines to the MML, and the points between them, were redesigned and realigned in order to integrate the new tunnel. The area around Belle Isle Junction features a gradual transition from ballasted track to concrete slab track in order to neatly integrate the two systems.

== History ==
=== Background ===
Between 1863 and 1977, King's York Road railway station existed as an appendage of London King's Cross. It allowed the latter to serve as an intermediate station, connecting commuter trains from Finsbury Park to the City Widened Lines to Farringdon via the steeply-curved and steeply-graded York Road Tunnel southbound, and the Hotel Curve northbound. The curve closed when heavy rail services began to Moorgate on the Northern City Line. This severed the connection between the ECML and the Snow Hill tunnel and South London.

The Canal Tunnels were designed to reinstate this connection between the ECML and what by then had become known as the Thameslink route. The project was part of the wider Thameslink Programme, a £7 billion project to upgrade and expand the north–south railway crossing the capital. The tunnels were the first main section of the programme to commence construction. The tunnels are named after the Regent's Canal, under which they pass.

=== Construction ===
The tunnels were designed by Halcrow Group, part of the Rail Link Engineering consortium. The construction process itself took roughly two years, with civil works commencing in 2004 and completed in 2006. Design and construction of the tunnels were planned to integrate with the adjacent railway engineering works for High Speed 1 and the redevelopment of the Railway Lands and St Pancras railway station. Despite their problem-free completion, the Canal Tunnels remained unused for several years. This was largely due to being completed well in advance of numerous other Thameslink elements, such as delivery of the new British Rail Class 700 multiple units ordered for the service and other infrastructure works. During this interval, track, power supply, and signalling systems were installed. In August 2012, railway infrastructure owner Network Rail announced that the construction company Carillion had been appointed as the principal contractor for the fitting-out of the Canal Tunnels.

The fitting-out process commenced during 2013 and was completed during the following year, several years ahead of services running; this was reportedly to facilitate stock movements and to take advantage of available land to facilitate the work. Carillion were the main contractors for the fitting out and connecting stages, while Balfour Beatty were contracted to install the overhead line electrification (OHLE); the designs for the tunnel's fittings were completed by Arup. During this phase of the works, construction occurred on a 24-hour basis, with Balfour Beatty installing the OHLE at night and Carillion installing everything else during the day. However, the work around the live rail connections still relied on possessions.

The signalling systems installed were integrated with Thameslink's High Capacity Infrastructure; in addition to conventional colour light signalling, the European Train Control System is present; Thameslink officials claimed that this arrangement was the world's first implementation of such technology on a mainline 'heavy' railway. Wherever possible all wiring, mechanical, and electrical equipment was cleanly run in a pair of interior troughs. Among the last elements of the work was the connection of the new track to the existing lines with new junctions; this stage of work had been started by May 2014.

== Operation ==
External media
- The northbound entrance to the tunnel showing the trailing point
- A cab ride through the Canal Tunnel southbound

On 26 February 2018, the first passenger service traversed the Canal Tunnels after many out-of-service trains had done so for testing. The tunnels were officially opened to traffic during May 2018, forming a part of the Thameslink route from that month onwards. The tunnels are also used to move Thameslink empty coaching stock from Hornsey Depot, where they are stabled. The connection with the ECML at Belle Isle Junction is managed by the King's Cross signalling system; the rest of the tunnels are the responsibility of the Three Bridges rail operating centre.

Until the tunnels were opened, capacity in the core section of the Thameslink route had been limited to 16 trains per hour, but the addition of trains coming from the ECML added another 8 trains of capacity. This meant the hypothetically possible peak service capacity was 24 trains per hour between St Pancras and Blackfriars, though as of the December 2025 timetable, the highest frequency of service is 20 trains per hour in each direction. Many of these movements are automated, making use of the route's advanced digital signalling.
