= London Bridge station =

London Underground and mainline railway station

London Bridge
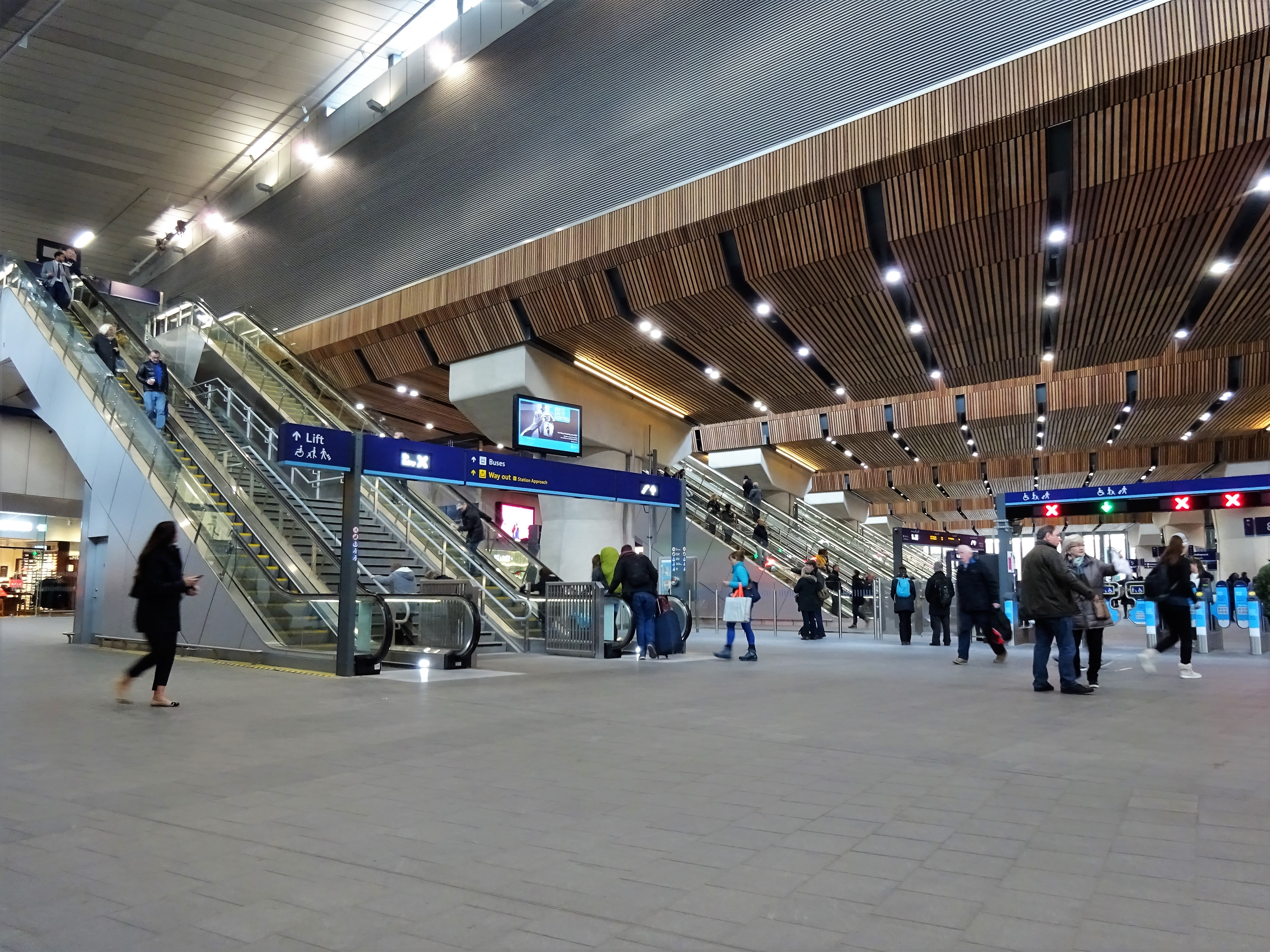
- Main station concourse
- Interactive map of London Bridge

General information
- Location: Southwark
- Local authority: London Borough of Southwark
- Managed by: Network Rail; London Underground
- Station code: LBG
- DfT category: A
- Number of platforms: 15
- Accessible: Yes
- Fare zone: 1
- OSI: London Bridge; London Bridge City Pier

National Rail annual entry and exit
- 2020–21: ▼13.764 million
- 2021–22: ▲33.309 million
- Interchange: ▲5.709 million
- 2022–23: ▲47.657 million
- Interchange: ▲14.058 million
- 2023–24: ▲50.045 million
- Interchange: ▼6.270 million
- 2024–25: ▲54.686 million
- Interchange: ▲6.980 million

Railway companies
- Original company: London and Greenwich Railway
- Pre-grouping: South Eastern Railway; London, Brighton & South Coast Railway
- Post-grouping: Southern Railway

Key dates
- 14 December 1836; 189 years ago: Opened

Other information
- External links: Departures; Facilities
- Coordinates: 51.5044°N 0.0857°W

London Bridge is a central London railway terminus and connected London Underground station in Southwark, south-east London. It occupies a large area on three levels immediately south-east of London Bridge, from which it takes its name. The main line station is the oldest railway station in London fare zone 1 and one of the oldest in the world, having opened in 1836. It is one of two main line termini in London to the south of the River Thames (the other being Waterloo) and is the fifth-busiest station in London, handling over 50 million passengers a year.

The station was originally opened by the London and Greenwich Railway as a local service. It subsequently served the London and Croydon Railway, the London and Brighton Railway and the South Eastern Railway, thus becoming an important London terminus. It was rebuilt in 1849 and again in 1864 to provide more services and increase capacity. Local services from London Bridge began to be electrified in the beginning of the 20th century, and had spread to national routes by the 1930s. The station was extensively rebuilt by British Rail during the 1970s, along with a comprehensive re-signalling scheme and track alignment. In the 2010s, the station was redeveloped as part of the Thameslink Programme to better accommodate the Thameslink route which provides a connection to Gatwick Airport, Luton Airport and the Elizabeth line.

The National Rail station is served by Southeastern services from Charing Cross and Cannon Street to destinations in southeast London, Kent and East Sussex and is a terminus for many Southern commuter and regional services to south London and numerous destinations in South East England. Thameslink services from Bedford, Cambridge and Peterborough to Brighton and other destinations in Sussex and Kent began serving the station in 2018. The London Underground station is served by the Jubilee and Northern lines.

== Location ==
The main line station is one of 19 UK stations managed by Network Rail. It has a ticket hall and entrance area with its main frontage on Tooley Street, and other entrances on Borough High Street and within the main line station concourse. It is one of two mainline London termini south of the River Thames, the other is Waterloo.

The London Underground station is on the Jubilee line and the Bank branch of the Northern line. River buses use the nearby London Bridge City Pier.

== History ==
London Bridge station was opened on 14 December 1836, making it the oldest London railway terminus that is still running. It was not the earliest station in the London metropolitan area, as the London and Greenwich Railway had opened stations at Spa Road (in Bermondsey) and Deptford on 8 February 1836. The completion of the line into London Bridge was postponed because of delays in constructing a bridge at Bermondsey Street. From 10 October 1836, trains were able to operate as far as the east end of this bridge, with passengers having to walk the last 300 yards (270 m). The station has had several changes of ownership and complete rebuilds since opening.

=== London and Greenwich Railway station ===
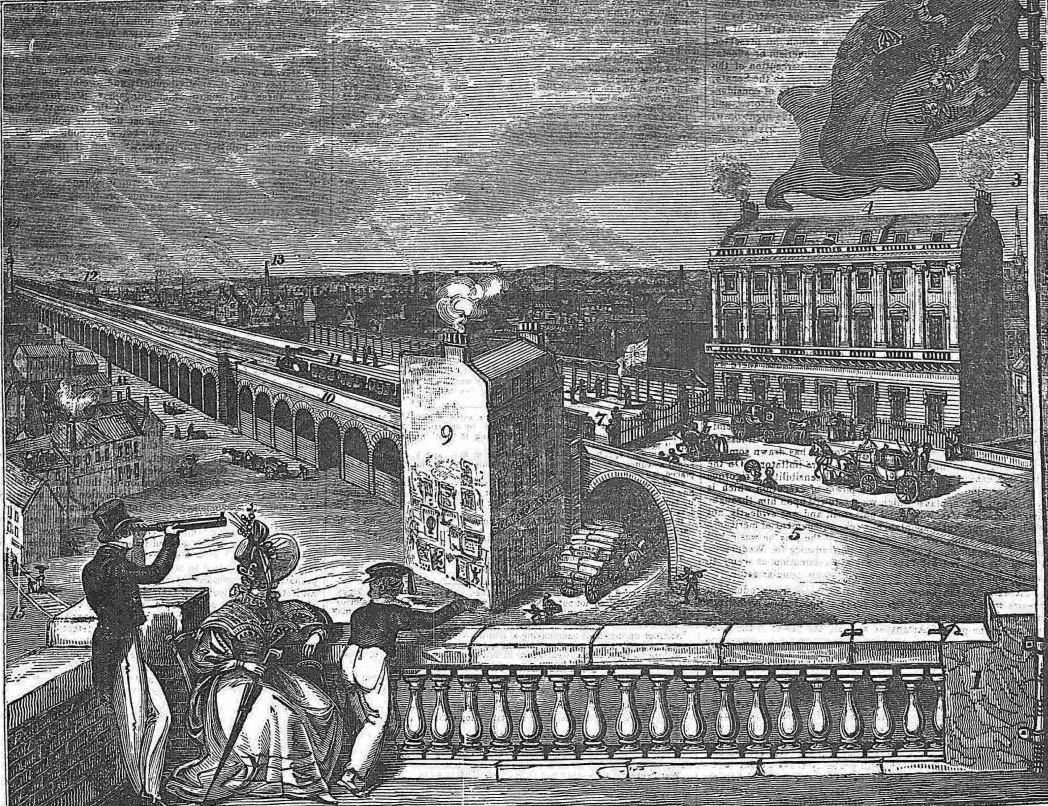
The original London and Greenwich Railway station in 1836

The original station had four tracks and was 60 feet (18 m) wide and 400 feet (120 m) long. It was approached through a pair of iron gates. Three tracks led into two platforms as a stub end of a viaduct. The station was entirely exposed to the weather until a tarred canvas roof was erected in 1840. Sixteen columns and fourteen beams from this structure were retrieved in 2013 and given to the Vale of Rheidol Railway in Aberystwyth, Wales for use in a planned railway museum.

Before completing the train shed, the London and Greenwich Railway entered into an agreement with the proposed London and Croydon Railway for the latter to use its tracks from Corbett's Lane, Bermondsey, and to share its station. However, the Greenwich railway had underestimated the cost of building the long viaduct leading to London Bridge and was not able to build a sufficiently large station for the traffic for both companies, and so in July 1836 it sold some land adjacent to its station (then still under construction) to the Croydon railway to build their own independent station.

=== London and Croydon Railway station ===
London and Croydon Railway (Southwark Station) Act 1838
- Act of Parliament
- Parliament of the United Kingdom
- Long title: An Act to enable the London and Croydon Railway Company to enlarge their Station in the Parish of Saint Olave in the Borough of Southwark in the County of Surrey, and to amend the Acts relating to the said Railway and Station.
- Citation: 1 & 2 Vict. c. xx

Dates
- Royal assent: 11 June 1838

Text of statute as originally enacted

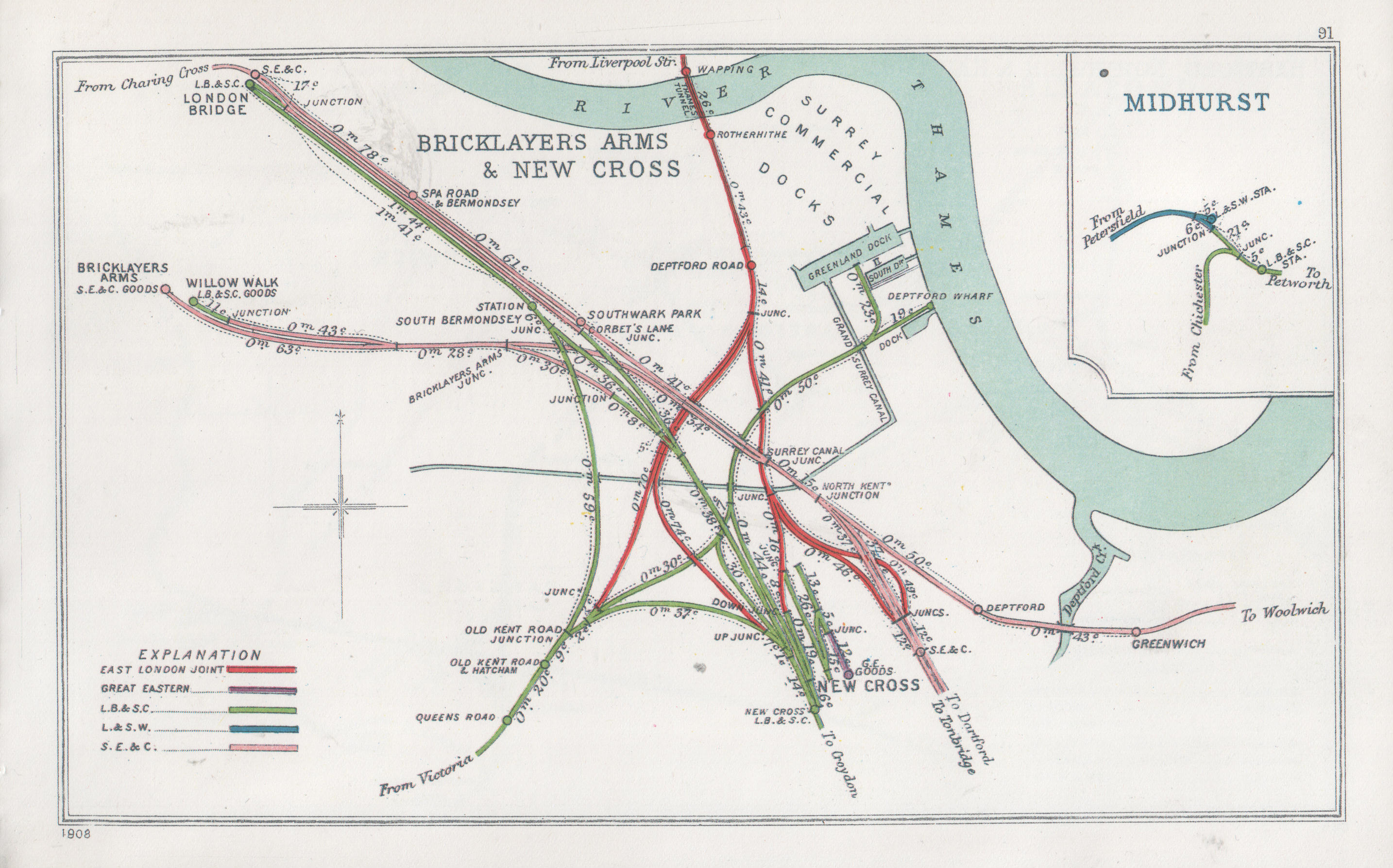
A 1908 Railway Clearing House map of lines around the approaches to London Bridge

The London and Brighton Railway and the South Eastern Railway (SER) were also planning routes from London to Brighton and Dover respectively, and the British Parliament decided that the London and Greenwich line should become the entry corridor into London from South East England. The two railways were therefore required to share the route of the London and Croydon Railway from near Norwood (which in turn shared the route of the London and Greenwich Railway from Bermondsey to London Bridge). As a result, the London and Croydon Railway obtained powers in the London and Croydon Railway (Southwark Station) Act 1838 (1 & 2 Vict. c. xx) to enlarge the station it was then constructing at London Bridge, before it had opened for traffic.

The London and Croydon Railway opened its line and began using its station on 5 June 1839; the London and Brighton Railway joined it on 12 July 1841, followed by the South Eastern Railway on 26 May 1842. It was soon found that the viaduct approaching London Bridge would be inadequate to deal with the traffic generated by four railways, so it was widened by the Greenwich Railway between 1840 and 1842, doubling the number of tracks to four. The new lines, intended for the Croydon, Brighton and South Eastern trains, were situated on the south side of the existing Greenwich line, whereas their station was to the north of the London Bridge site, leading to an awkward and potentially dangerous crossing of one another's lines. The directors of the companies involved decided to exchange sites; the London and Greenwich Railway would take over the newly completed London and Croydon Railway station, whilst a new joint committee of the Croydon, Brighton and South Eastern companies would demolish the first station and build a new one on its site.

=== Joint station ===
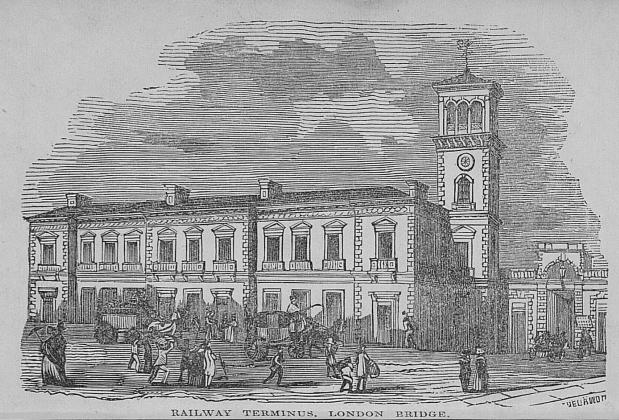
The proposed London Bridge joint station c. 1844

Plans for a large new station were drawn up, designed jointly by Lewis Cubitt, John Urpeth Rastrick and Henry Roberts. Drawings were published in the Illustrated London News and George Bradshaw's Guide to the London and Brighton Railway 1844. They show 'a quasi-Italianate building with a picturesque campanile'. It opened for business in July 1844 while only partially complete, but events were taking place which would mean that the bell tower would never be built, and the new building would only last five years.

In 1843 the SER and Croydon railway companies became increasingly concerned by the high tolls charged by the London and Greenwich Railway for the use of the station approaches, and gained approval in the South Eastern Railway (Swan Street Station and Junction) Act 1843 (6 & 7 Vict. c. lxii) to build their own independent line into south London to a new station at Bricklayers Arms, which was vaguely described as a "West End terminus". This line opened on 1 May 1844 and most of the services from these two companies were withdrawn from London Bridge, leaving only the Greenwich and Brighton companies using London Bridge station. The Greenwich company was on the brink of bankruptcy and so was forced to lease its lines to the SER, which took effect from 1 January 1845. The next year the Croydon and Brighton companies, along with other small railways, merged to form the London Brighton and South Coast Railway (LB&SCR). Consequently, there were only two companies serving London Bridge. The LB&SCR used the unfinished joint station until it was demolished in 1849 and a larger building constructed.

=== South Eastern Railway station ===
London Bridge Railway Termini General Enlargement Act 1847
- Act of Parliament
- Parliament of the United Kingdom
- Long title: An Act for enlarging the present Station of the London, Brighton, and South Coast Railway Company at or near London Bridge, and for the Division of the present Station between the London, Brighton, and South Coast and the South-eastern Railway Companies, for the separate Accommodation of the Traffic of such Two Railway Companies.
- Citation: 10 & 11 Vict. c. cclxxvi

Dates
- Royal assent: 22 July 1847

Text of statute as originally enacted

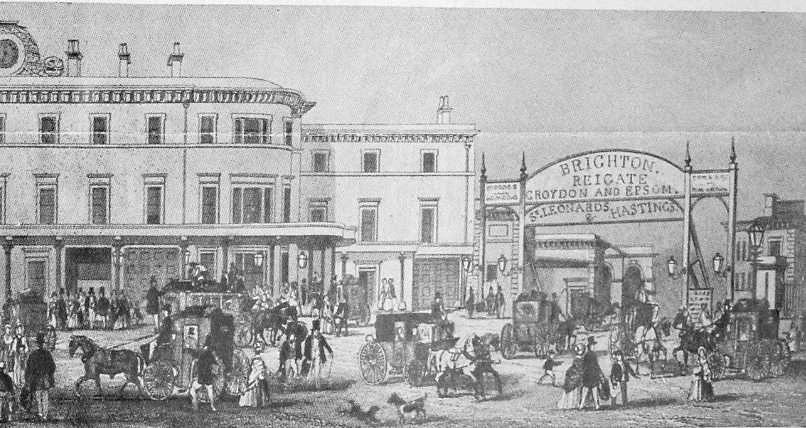
The South Eastern Station (left) and the temporary Brighton station c. 1850 after the demolition of the joint station

The SER took over the second London and Greenwich station (which had been built for the London and Croydon Railway) and sought to develop that site rather than continue to invest in the former joint station, which became the property of the LB&SCR. The SER station was therefore rebuilt and enlarged between 1847 and 1850, to a design by Samuel Beazley. At the same time yet further improvements were made to the station approaches, increasing the number of tracks to six, which entirely separated the lines of the two railways. Once these extensions were complete the SER closed its passenger terminus at Bricklayer's Arms and converted the site into a goods depot in 1852.

London Bridge station remained the London terminus of the SER until 1864 when its station was again rebuilt. Five of the existing platforms were converted into a through station to enable the extension of the main line into central London and the opening of Charing Cross railway station, and in 1866 to Cannon Street station. In 1899 the SER entered into a working amalgamation with the London Chatham and Dover Railway (LC&DR) to form the South Eastern and Chatham Railway Companies Joint Management Committee. Junctions were laid to enable trains through London Bridge to reach the LC&DR stations at Holborn Viaduct and St Pauls.

=== London, Brighton and South Coast Railway station ===
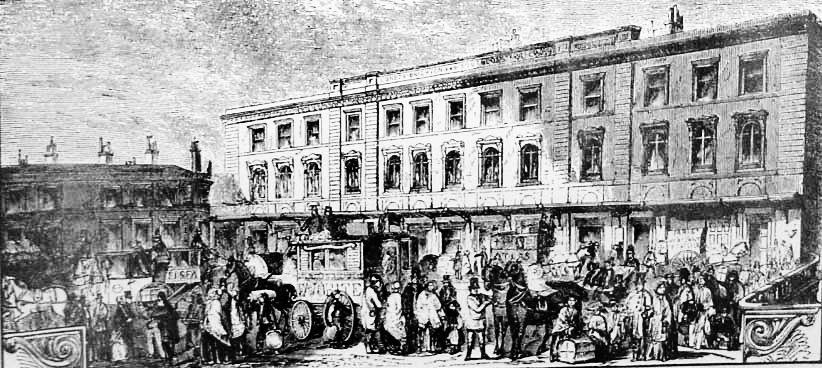
The London Brighton and South Coast Railway station c. 1853

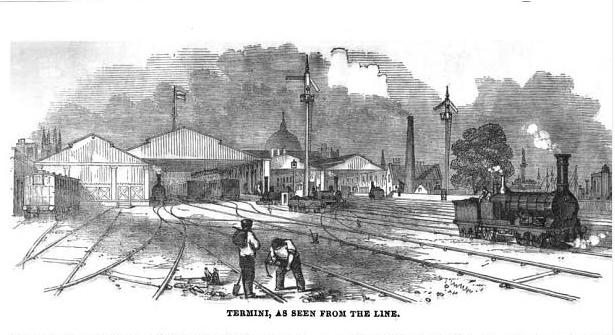
The two stations, as seen from the line c. 1853

The London, Brighton and South Coast Railway (LB&SCR) took over the unfinished joint station, which they demolished in 1849 and opened a temporary station in 1850. This was rebuilt and enlarged in 1853–4 to deal with the additional traffic from the lines to Sydenham and Crystal Palace. A three-storey box-like structure in Italian style was erected, with the name of the railway emblazoned on the top parapet.

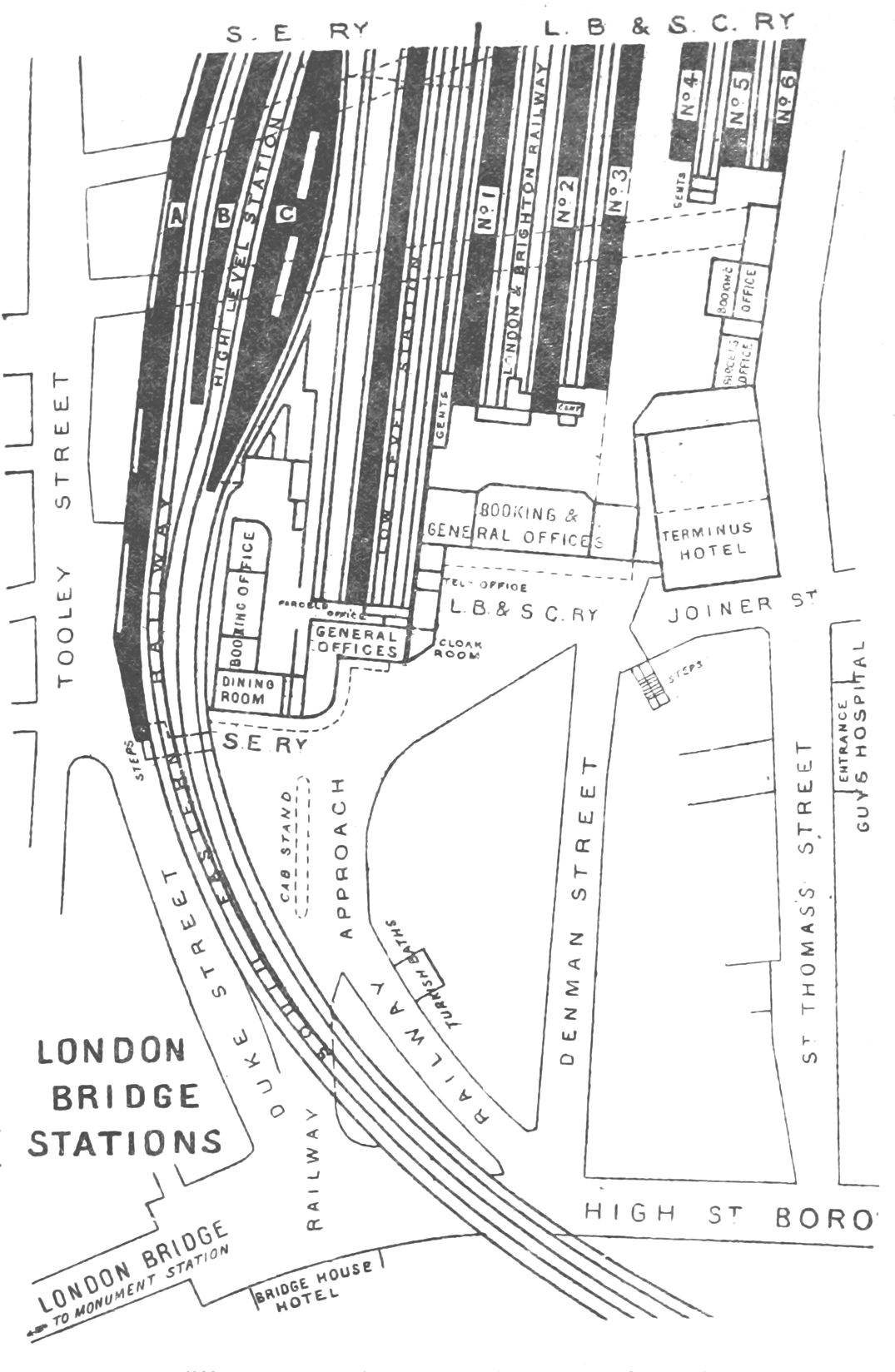
Plan of the stations by 1888, with the SER's separate high- and low-level tracks, and the LB&SCR's new platforms 4, 5 and 6 and Terminus Hotel

In 1859 the LC&DR applied to the LB&SCR for running powers from Sydenham to London Bridge, but was refused. However, some ticketing arrangement was made between the two companies as the LC&DR advertised connections to and from London Bridge in its timetables in The Times and Bradshaw's Railway Guide for July 1861. This arrangement was short-lived pending the construction of the LC&DR line to Holborn Viaduct.

The LB&SCR also built the Terminus Hotel at the station in 1861. It was designed by Henry Currey, architect for St Thomas's Hospital, and had 150 public rooms over seven stories. It was unsuccessful because it was on the south bank of the river, so was turned into offices for the railway in 1893. It was destroyed by bombing in 1941.

The London, Brighton and South Coast Railway (Stations, &c.) Act 1862 (25 & 26 Vict. c. lxviii) gave the LB&SCR power to enlarge the station further. Over the next few years under the direction of new chief engineer Frederick Banister, the company built four more platform-faces in an adjoining area to the south of its existing station to cope with additional traffic generated by the completion of the South London Line and other suburban lines to Victoria station. This had a single-span trussed-arch roof measuring 88 by 655 ft (27 by 200 m), and was designed by J. Hawkshaw and Banister. During the first decade of the twentieth century LB&SCR station at London Bridge was again enlarged, but overall London Bridge station remained a "sprawling confusion".

The chaotic nature of the station at the turn of the century was described in John Davidson's poem, "London Bridge":

Inside the station, everything's so old,
So inconvenient, of such manifold
Perplexity, and, as a mole might see,
So strictly what a station shouldn't be,
That no idea minifies its crude
And yet elaborate ineptitude.

— John Davidson, Fleet Street and Other Poems

The South London Line from London Bridge to Victoria was electrified in 1909 with an experimental overhead system. It was successful and other suburban services were electrified including the line to Crystal Palace in 1912. Because of World War I, the line to Croydon was not electrified until 1920.

=== Southern Railway station ===
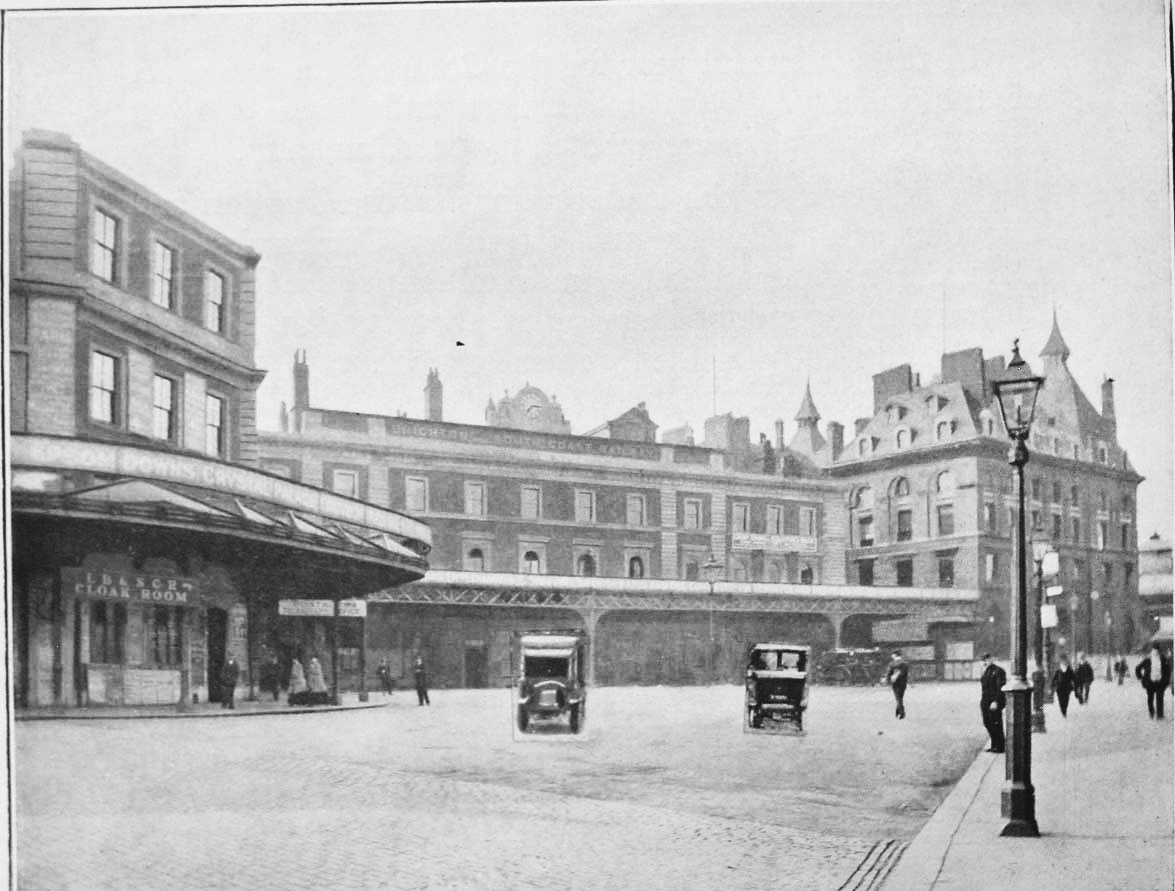
The LB&SCR station in 1922 shortly before Southern Railway ownership. The Terminus Hotel is to the right of the picture.

The Railways Act 1921 led to the Big Four grouping in 1923. All of the railways of southern England combined to form the Southern Railway (SR), bringing the London Bridge complex under single ownership. The wall that divided the Chatham and Brighton stations was partially knocked through in 1928 to provide an easier interchange between stations. This allowed a greater range of platforms to be used for the increasingly frequent suburban rail services to London Bridge.

Between 1926 and 1928 the Southern Railway electrified the SE&CR suburban lines at London Bridge using a third rail system, adapting the existing LB&SCR routes to it at the same time. The first electric services ran on 25 March 1928 from London Bridge to Crystal Palace via Sydenham, followed by a peak hour service to Coulsdon North on 17 June. This was followed by electric services to Epsom Downs via West Croydon, Crystal Palace via Tulse Hill, and Streatham Hill, and to Dorking North and Effingham Junction via Mitcham on 3 March 1929. At the same time as electrification, the SR installed colour light signalling. The Southern Railway electrified the Brighton Main Line services to Brighton and the South Coast, providing a full service to Three Bridges on 17 July 1932. This was followed by a full electric service to Brighton and West Worthing on 1 January 1933, followed by services to Seaford, Eastbourne and Hastings on 7 July 1935 and to Bognor Regis and Littlehampton on 3 July 1938.

By the 1930s, a regular feature of London Bridge traffic was a glut of commuter services all departing at or shortly after 5:00 pm. A typical timetable included 12-car services to Brighton, Eastbourne and Littlehampton, all between 5:00 and 5:05. "The fives" continued to run until the mid-1970s.

Both the London Bridge stations were badly damaged by bombing in the London Blitz in December 1940 and early 1941. The shell of the two stations was patched up but the former Terminus Hotel, then used as railway offices, was rendered unsafe and demolished.

=== British Railways station ===
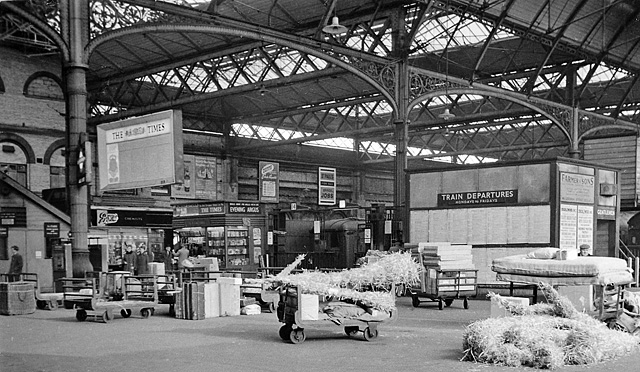
Central Section concourse before the 1978 rebuilding

British Railways (BR) took over responsibility for the station in 1948 following nationalisation of the railways. They did not consider London Bridge a priority at first, and the war-torn damage of the station remained into the 1960s. Electrification of the lines into London Bridge continued during the 1950s and 1960s, with the final steam service running in 1964, when the line to Oxted and Uckfield was replaced by diesel / electric multiple units. The very last scheduled steam train was the 4.50am to Tonbridge via Redhill on 4 January 1964 hauled by an N class locomotive.

By the early 1970s the station could no longer cope with the volume of traffic. Between 1972 and 1978, BR significantly redeveloped the station and its approaches. This included a £21 million re-signalling scheme that consolidated 16 signal boxes into a new London Bridge Area Signalling Centre and a new station concourse designed by N. D. T. Wikeley, regional architect for the Southern Region. This was opened 14 December 1978. New awnings were added over the former SER platforms, but the arched Brighton roof was left. It was described by The Oxford companion to British Railway History as "one of the best modern station reconstructions in Britain".

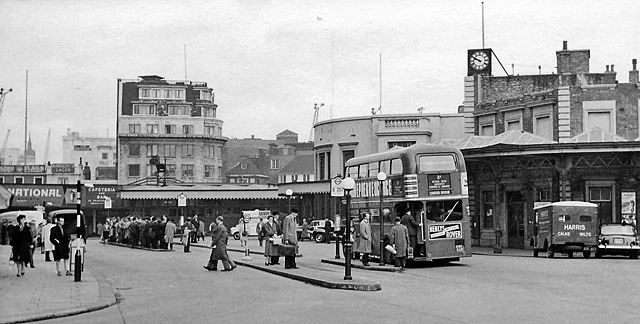
The station approach before the 1978 rebuilding

Patronage to London Bridge tailed off from a peak in the early 1970s. The station remained popular for through routes to the City and the West End, but the number of terminal trains declined significantly by the early 1980s. The bridge over the station's north end became Grade II listed in January 1988, while Platforms 9–16 (the former LB&SCR side) became listed the same that December.

In 1991, a "Thameslink 2000" project was proposed that would improve services between London Bridge and the Great Northern lines. It was originally hoped the work would be complete by 1997. A £500 million refurbishment programme was announced by Railtrack in 1999, which would have seen the station complex rotated by 90 degrees, and large amount of shopping space added.

=== Thameslink Programme ===
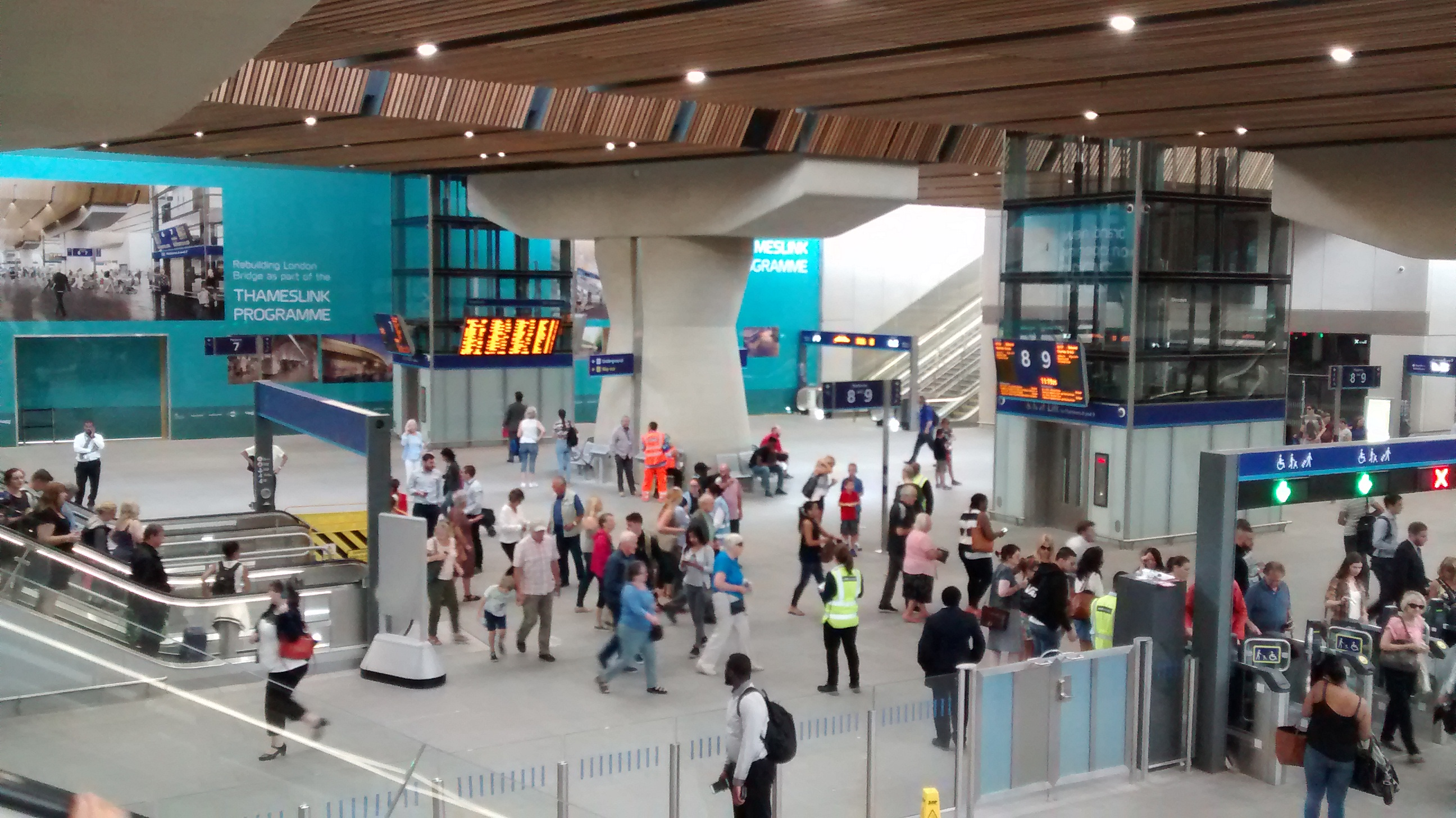
Part of the concourse under platforms 7–9

The station was comprehensively redeveloped by Grimshaw Architects between 2009 and 2017 with the rebuilding of all platforms, the addition of two major new street-level entrances, and changes to passenger concourses and retail facilities. The Shard opened next to the station in 2012. It included a new entrance and roof for the terminal level concourse, and a larger bus station was constructed in front of the building.

This was followed by a major transformation programme known as Masterplan, linked to the Thameslink programme.

Work began in 2012 with the terminal platforms adjacent to St Thomas Street, reducing the number from nine to six and extending them to accommodate longer 12-car trains. Through platforms were increased from six to nine, all of which catered for 12-car trains. (Note: Historically, platforms 4, 5 & 6 served services to and from both Charing Cross station and the Thameslink core, creating conflicting moves and capacity problems during peak hours.) In the redeveloped station, Charing Cross services were assigned four new dedicated platforms (6, 7, 8 and 9), and Thameslink services to platforms 4 and 5. The existing platforms for Cannon Street services on the north side of the station were also rebuilt.

During the works, Charing Cross trains did not call at the station for most of 2015–16 as the platforms were rebuilt, followed by Cannon Street trains from 2016 to 2017. Thameslink services to/from the Thameslink core did not stop between 2015 and May 2018, when an all day service with significantly enhanced frequency began as the programme of works was completed.

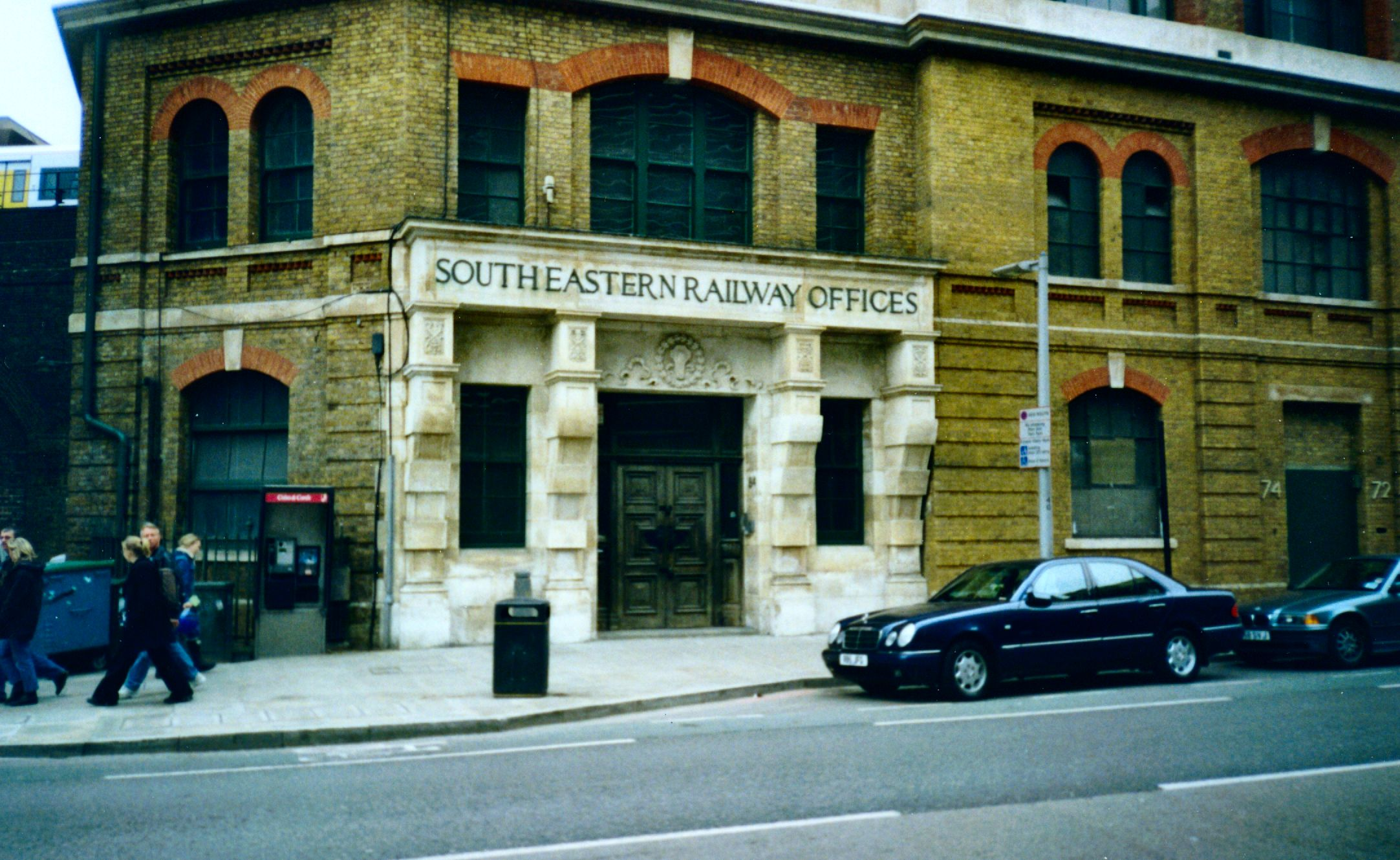
The South Eastern Railway's former headquarters in Tooley Street, London, near London Bridge station

As part of the rebuilding works, the listed northern wall of the terminus train-shed was demolished and replaced with a new retaining wall, and the listed bays of the roof over the terminating platforms were dismantled and stored. Each of the rebuilt platforms has its own full length platform canopy.

The footbridge dating from the 1970s that linked platforms for passenger interchange was also demolished, replaced by an interchange concourse underneath the platforms accessed by lift, stairs and escalator. This required the demolition of brick vaults between Stainer and Weston Streets, which were pedestrianised and became part of the new concourse. A wider route was created through the Western Arcade to Joiner Street and the underground station by relocating existing shops in to renovated barrel vaults. Two major new street level entrances were opened to the south on St Thomas Street, and to the north, on Tooley Street. This required demolishing the 1893 SER office building.

The refurbished station was officially opened by Prince William, Duke of Cambridge on 9 May 2018. The total estimated value of the project was around £1 billion. In July 2019, the refurbished station made the shortlist for the Stirling Prize for excellence in architecture.

In 2020 the Thameslink lines at London Bridge were one of the few locations in the UK to use a digital signalling system.

In October 2022 a rescued Victorian-era church pipe organ, nicknamed "Henry", was installed on the station concourse. The organ is free for public use.

== National Rail station ==
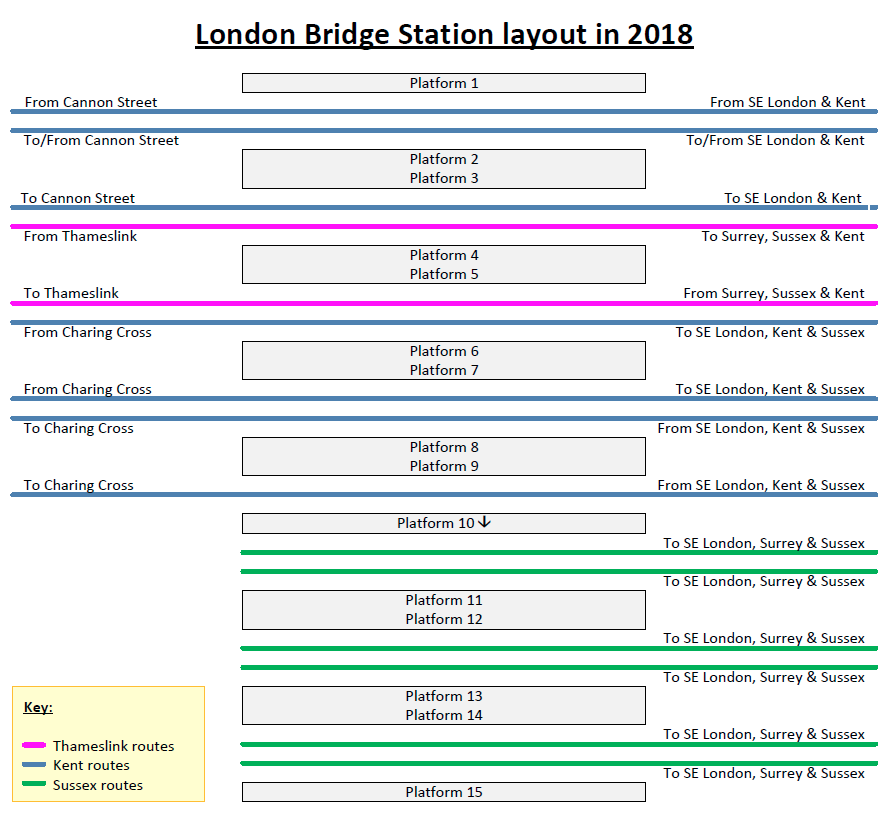
A plan of lines in and out of London Bridge Station

The station's platform configuration is:

- Platforms 1, 2 and 3 serve trains to/from Cannon Street and southeast London and Kent.
- Platforms 4 and 5 serve Thameslink trains between the Brighton main line and the Thameslink core via Blackfriars.
- Platforms 6–9 serve trains to/from Charing Cross to southeast London, Kent and East Sussex.
- Platforms 10–15 are terminal platforms, which serve mainly Southern services toward south London and the south coast

All platforms are bi-directional, trains to London Charing Cross can run from platforms 3-9, as well as trains to London Blackfriars and the Thameslink core. Trains to London Cannon Street can also depart from platform 4 if necessary.

The platforms are linked together by a large street-level concourse, offering a ticket office, retail facilities and waiting areas, with entrances on St Thomas Street and Tooley Street. In addition, an upper level entrance gives direct access to platforms 10–15.

=== Services ===
London Bridge is one of the busiest stations in the UK, with an estimated 63.1 million passenger entries/exits in 2019/20. However, as with other stations, patronage dropped dramatically as a result of the COVID-19 pandemic. The estimated usage figure fell 78% in 2020/21 to 13.8 million, although it rose in the ranking by one place to the third busiest in the country, behind Stratford and Victoria, both also in London.

Typical services from the station are:

==== Southeastern to/from Charing Cross ====
The typical weekday off-peak service in trains per hour (tph) is:

- 16 tph to London Charing Cross
- 4 tph to Dartford via Sidcup of which 2 continue to Gravesend
- 1 tph to Dartford via Bexleyheath
- 4 tph to Hayes via Catford Bridge
- 2 tph to Sevenoaks via Grove Park
- 1 tph to Dover Priory
- 1 tph to Ramsgate via Canterbury West
- 2 tph to Hastings via Tunbridge Wells (1 semi-fast, 1 stopping)
- 1 tph to Maidstone East via Swanley

==== Southeastern to/from Cannon Street ====
The typical weekday off-peak service in trains per hour (tph) is:

- 8 tph to London Cannon Street
- 2 tph to Orpington via Grove Park
- 2 tph to Slade Green via Greenwich and Woolwich Arsenal, returning to London Cannon Street via Bexleyheath
- 2 tph to Slade Green via Bexleyheath, returning to London Cannon Street via Woolwich Arsenal and Greenwich
- 2 tph to Gravesend via Lewisham and Woolwich Arsenal

==== Southern ====
The typical weekday off-peak service in trains per hour (tph) is:

- 2 tph to East Croydon via Peckham Rye
- 2 tph to Caterham and Tattenham Corner, dividing and attaching at Purley
- 2 tph to Beckenham Junction via Crystal Palace
- 2 tph to London Victoria via Crystal Palace
- 2 tph to Epsom via Sutton
- 1 tph to Uckfield via Oxted

During peak times, additional services via Anerley and Penge West stop here, as well as mainline services to Littlehampton, Bognor Regis and Eastbourne.

==== Thameslink ====
The typical weekday off-peak service in trains per hour (tph) is:

- 4 tph to Brighton via Gatwick Airport
- 2 tph to Horsham via Redhill and Gatwick Airport
- 2 tph to Three Bridges via Redhill
- 2 tph to Rainham via Greenwich, Woolwich Arsenal, Dartford and Gravesend
- 2 tph to Luton (stopping)
- 4 tph to Bedford (semi-fast)
- 2 tph to Cambridge via Stevenage
- 2 tph to Peterborough via Stevenage

Preceding station	National Rail	Following station
London Blackfriars	Thameslink Thameslink	East Croydon or Norwood Junction or Deptford
London Waterloo East	Southeastern Hayes Line	Lewisham or Ladywell
London Waterloo East	Southeastern Maidstone East Line (via Chislehurst Junction)	Swanley
London Waterloo East or London Cannon Street	Southeastern South Eastern Main Line	Orpington or Sevenoaks
London Waterloo East or London Cannon Street	Southeastern Bexleyheath Line	New Cross or Lewisham
London Waterloo East or London Cannon Street	Southeastern Dartford Loop Line	New Cross or Lewisham or Hither Green
London Waterloo East or London Cannon Street	Southeastern Grove Park Line	New Cross or Lewisham or Hither Green
London Cannon Street	Southeastern North Kent Line	New Cross
London Cannon Street	Southeastern Greenwich Line	Deptford
London Cannon Street	Southeastern Chatham Main Line (via Chislehurst Junction) Peak Hours Only	Rochester
Terminus	Southern Brighton Main Line	New Cross Gate or Norwood Junction or East Croydon
Terminus	Southern Oxted Line	East Croydon
Terminus	Southern South London Line	South Bermondsey
	Historical railways	
London Cannon Street or London Waterloo East	South Eastern and Chatham Railway Greenwich line	Spa Road
Blackfriars Road	South Eastern Railway South Eastern Main Line	Spa Road

== London Underground station ==
London Bridge
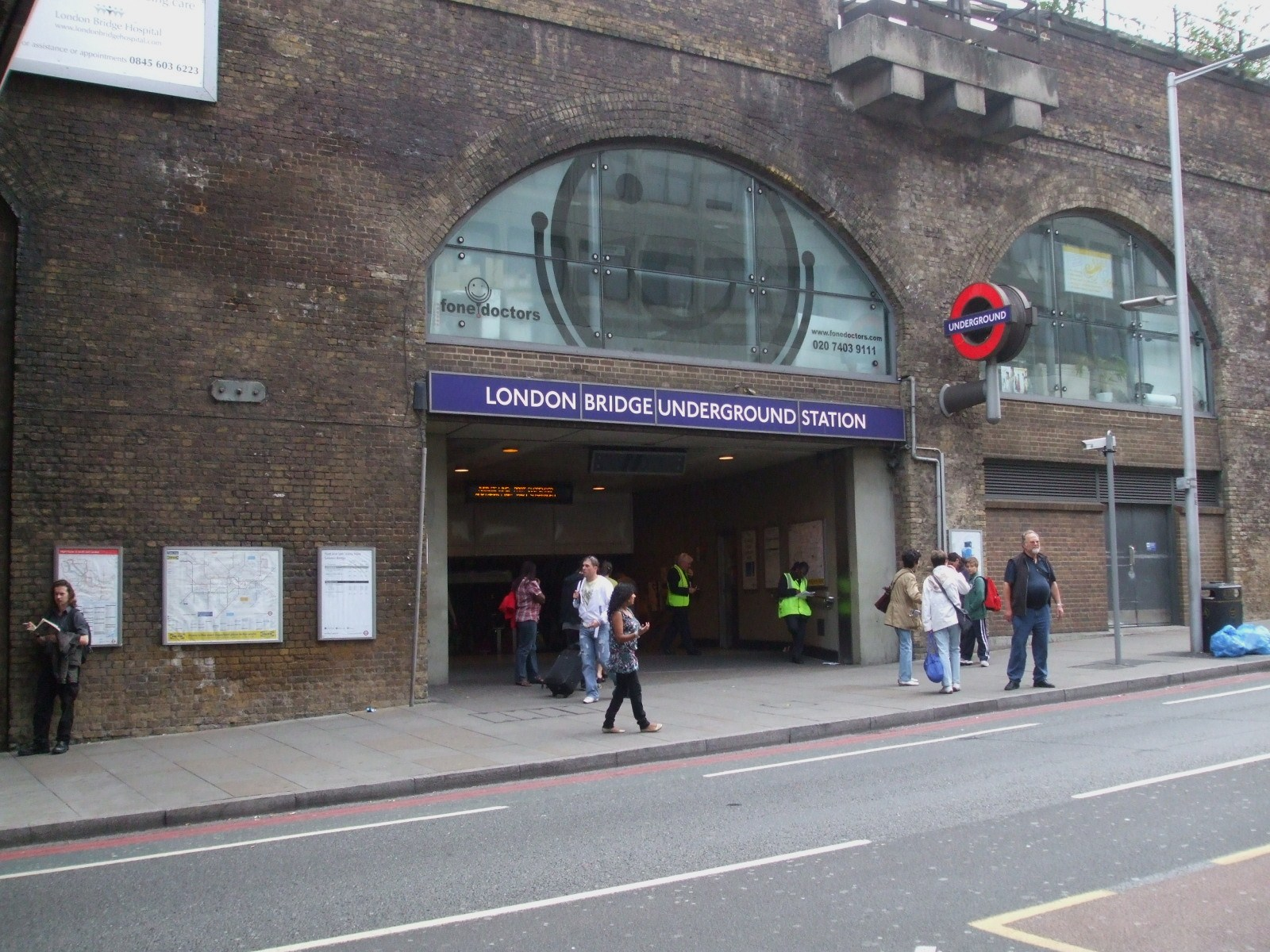
- Tooley Street entrance

General information
- Location: Borough
- Local authority: London Borough of Southwark
- Managed by: London Underground
- Number of platforms: 4
- Accessible: Yes
- Fare zone: 1
- OSI: London Bridge

London Underground annual entry and exit
- 2021: ▲30.86 million
- 2022: ▲56.20 million
- 2023: ▼54.77 million
- 2024: ▲55.46 million
- 2025: ▲56.19 million

Railway companies
- Original company: City & South London Railway

Key dates
- 25 February 1900: Opened
- 7 October 1999: Jubilee line started

Other information
- External links: TfL station info page

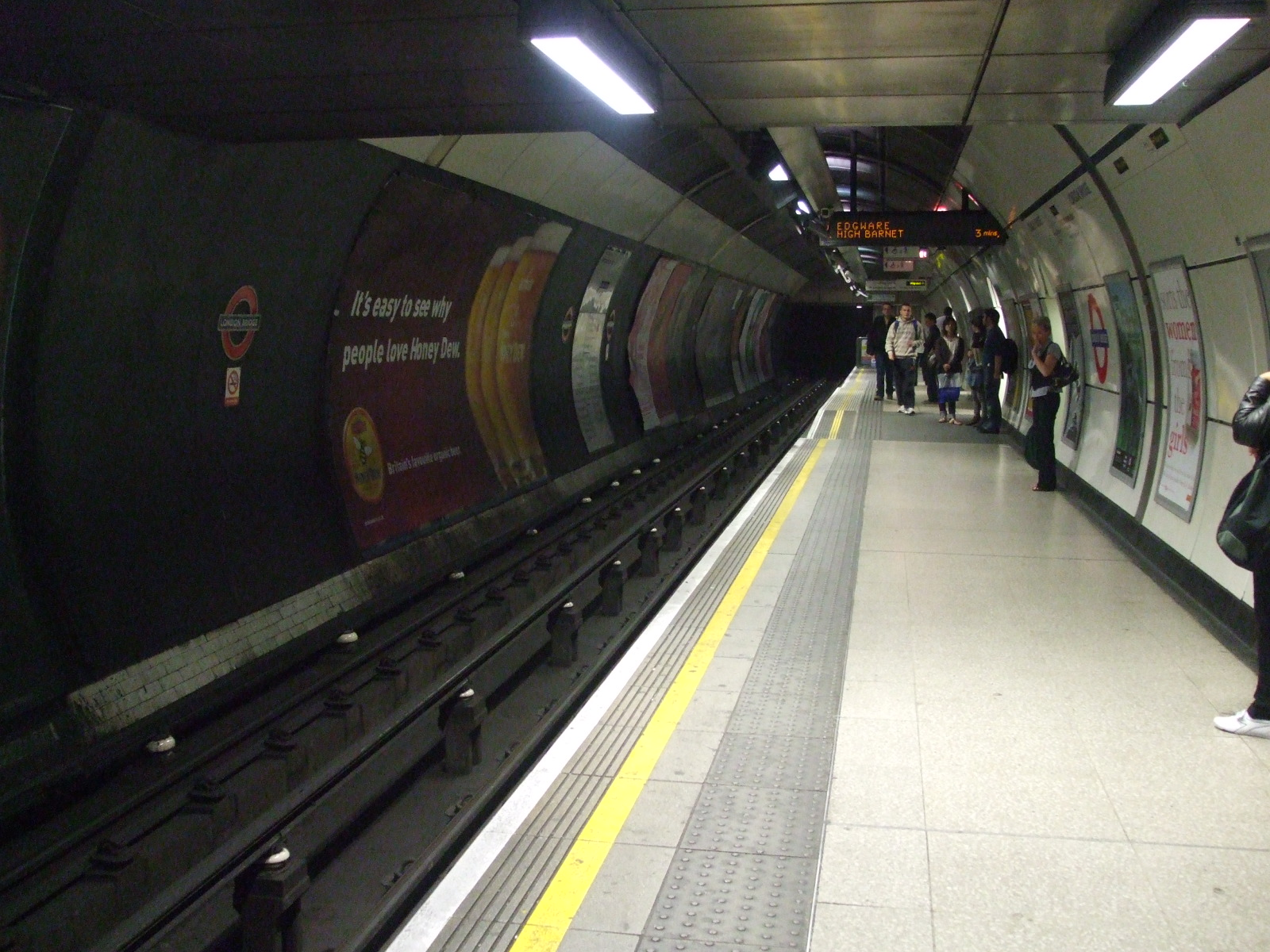
Northern line northbound platform

On the London Underground, London Bridge is served by the Jubilee and Northern lines. In 2024, it was the 6th busiest station on the network with 57.89 million users. It is the only station on the London Underground network with "London" in its name (while the NR termini are named, for instance, "London Waterloo" the Underground station is simply named "Waterloo").

There are two platforms on each line and two main sets of escalators to and from the Tooley Street ticket hall. All four platforms are directly accessible from the Borough High Street entrance/exit. There is an emergency exit to Joiner Street.

=== Northern line ===
The first underground station at London Bridge was part of the second section of the City & South London Railway (C&SLR). The company had been formed on 28 July 1884 with the intention of constructing a line under the Thames from King William Street to Stockwell via Elephant and Castle and Kennington, which opened on 18 December 1890. No station was provided at London Bridge; the first station south of the river was at Borough. King William Street was found to be badly placed owing to a steep incline towards the station from underneath the Thames, which limited its capacity.

When the decision was made to extend the C&SLR northwards to Moorgate, a new pair of tunnels was constructed from north of Borough station on a new alignment providing a more convenient route and the opportunity to open a station at London Bridge. The tunnels to King William Street and the station were closed and the extension and London Bridge station opened on 25 February 1900.

The station entrance was originally at Three Castles House on the corner of London Bridge Street and Railway Approach, but has since been moved to Borough High Street and Tooley Street. The original entrance remained standing until March 2013 when it was demolished.

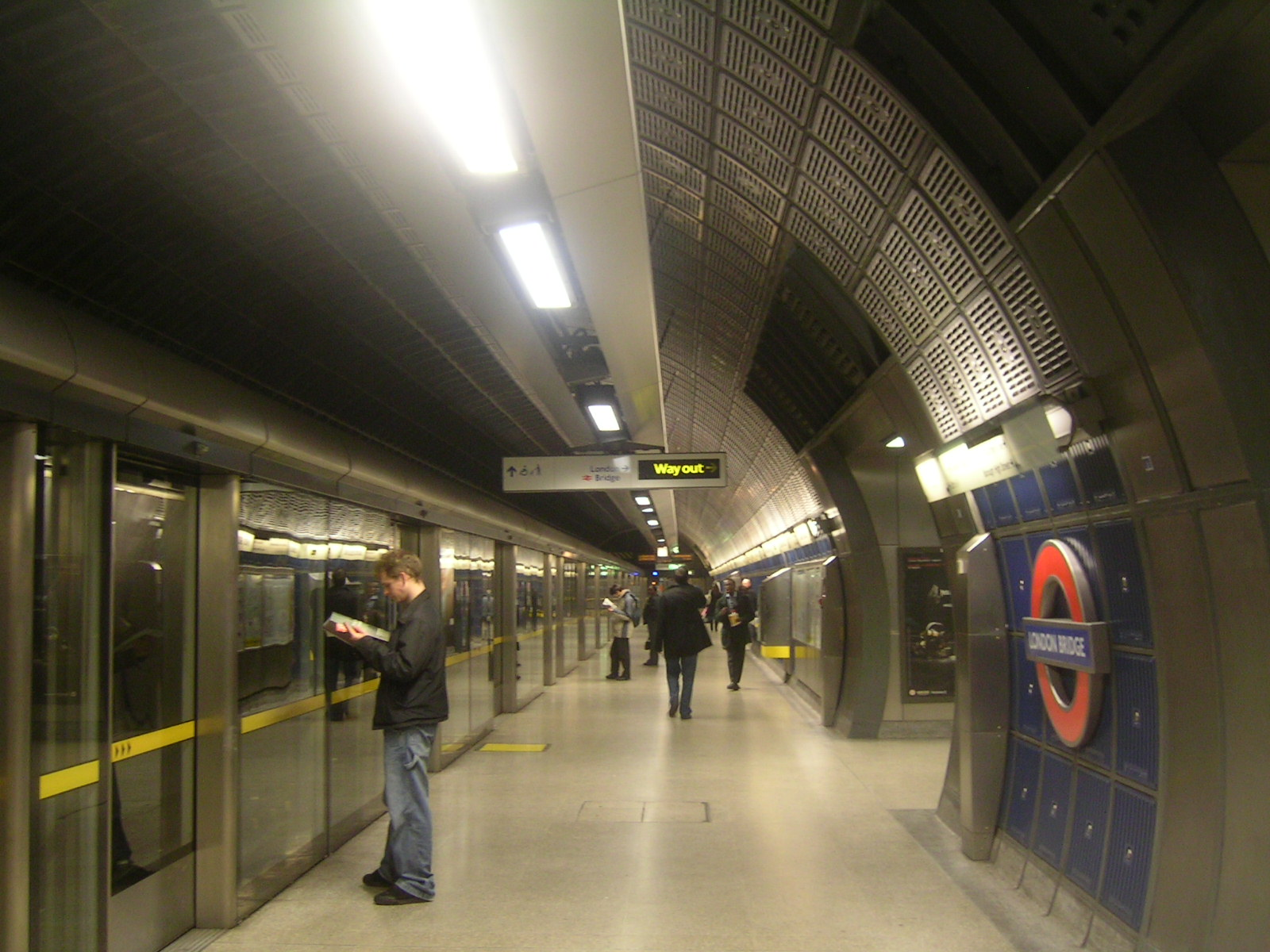
Jubilee line platform

In the aftermath of the King's Cross fire in 1987, an independent report recommended that London Underground investigate "passenger flow and congestion in stations and take remedial action". As a consequence, the congested Northern line platforms were rebuilt during the late 1990s, increasing the platform and circulation areas for the opening of the Jubilee Line Extension.

The station is arranged for right-hand running because it is in a stretch of the Northern line (from just south of Borough to just south of Moorgate) where the northbound line is to the east of the southbound, instead of to the west.

=== Jubilee line ===
On the Jubilee line, London Bridge station is between Southwark to the west and Bermondsey to the east. The Jubilee line station opened on 7 October 1999 as part of the Jubilee Line Extension, although trains had been running through non-stop from the previous month. It took months of major engineering works to relocate buried services in the surrounding streets to enable the Jubilee line's construction. A new ticket hall was created in the arches under the main-line station, with entrances at Joiner Street and Borough High Street.

During excavations a variety of Roman remains were found, including pottery and fragments of mosaics; some of these are now on display in the station. The Jubilee line platforms have been fitted with platform screen doors in common with all other below-ground stations on the extension.

There is a facing crossover to the west of the station enabling trains to terminate here.

Preceding station	London Underground	Following station
Southwark towards Stanmore	Jubilee line	Bermondsey towards Stratford
Bank towards Edgware, Mill Hill East or High Barnet	Northern line Bank branch	Borough towards Morden

== Connections ==
A large number of London Buses routes serve the station area day and night, many using London Bridge bus station.

== Accidents and incidents ==
There have been several recorded accidents at London Bridge station, though relatively few of these have caused fatalities. The most serious accidents were:

- On 1 February 1884, the 12:05 pm London Bridge to Victoria, hauled by LB&SCR Terrier No.71 Wapping, collided with a D1 tank which was fouling the exit from the platform. Two carriages derailed.
- On 27 November 1895, a local train hauled by LB&SCR Terrier No. 70 Poplar collided with the buffer stops.
- In August 1926, a F1 class locomotive overran the buffers and crashed into a brewery.
- On 9 July 1928, B2X class locomotive No. B210 was in a sidelong collision with an electric multiple unit after the driver of B210 misread signals. Two people were killed and nine were injured, six seriously.
- On 23 January 1948, a train formed of a 6PAN and a 6PUL unit, which formed that day's 7:30 am service from Ore coupled with the 8:50 am from Seaford, was allowed to draw up to the inner home signal, where it should have stopped. Instead, it overran the signal and collided at a speed of between 15 and 20 mph (24 and 32 km/h) with an empty stock which had formed the 8:20 am from Brighton and was waiting to depart London Bridge's platform 14 for New Cross Gate. This train was formed of two 6PAN units. The train that was struck was forced through the buffers and demolished a bookstall. Two train crew and one passenger were killed and 34 people were injured.
- On 11 April 1989, a passenger train arriving from Tattenham Corner collided with the buffers. Six people were injured.
- On 28 February 1992, a bomb planted by the Provisional IRA exploded at the station, injuring 29 people.
- On 3 June 2017, the station was closed for several hours during a terrorist attack on London Bridge and in nearby Borough Market.
- On 29 November 2019, the station was closed for several hours during a terrorist attack on London Bridge where two people were fatally stabbed.
- On 13 December 2024, a passenger train operated by Class 377 unit 377 426 collided with the buffer stops. No injuries were reported. The cause was found to be driver error most likely due to a microsleep.
