= British Rail Class 487 =

Class of British electric multiple unit

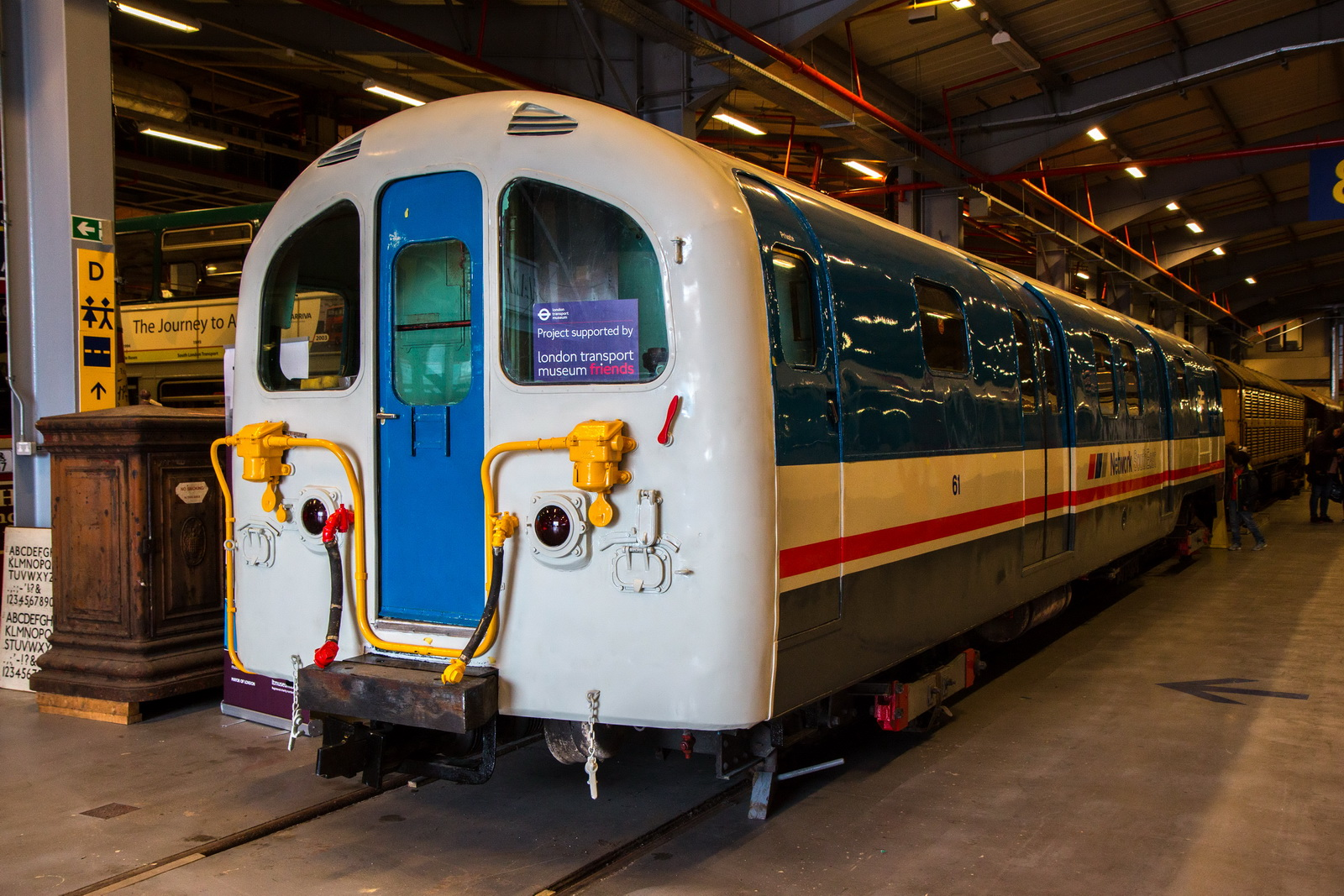
- The sole preserved Class 487 vehicle at the London Transport Museum Depot

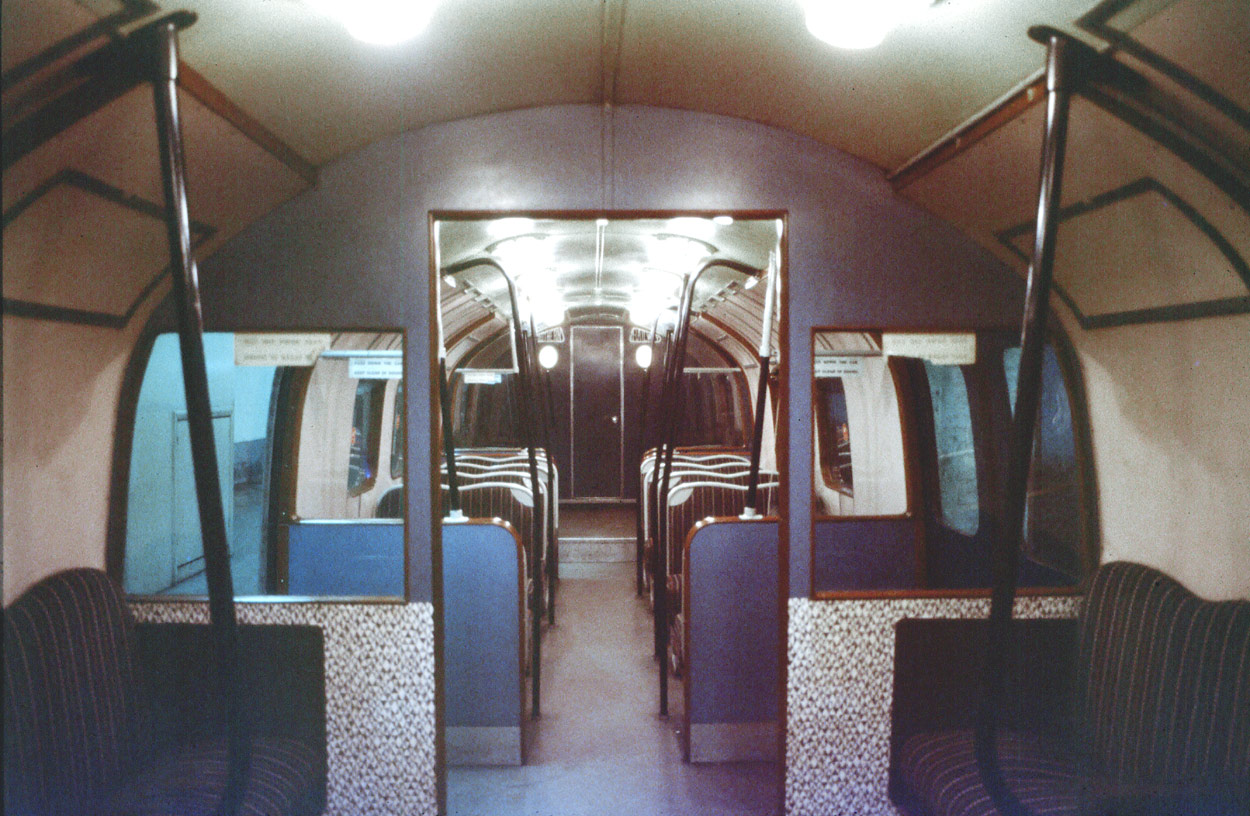
- The interior of a Class 487 DMBSO, looking towards the driving cab at the Bank end, with the 'hump' over the powered bogie.
- In service: 1940–1993
- Manufacturer: English Electric
- Built at: Dick, Kerr works, Preston
- Family name: Tube
- Replaced: W&CR stock
- Constructed: 1938–1940
- Entered service: 1940
- Scrapped: 1993
- Number built: 28 vehicles (12 DMBSO, 16 TSO)
- Number preserved: 1 vehicle
- Number scrapped: 27 vehicles
- Successor: Class 482
- Formation: One DMBSO, or two DMBSO flanking up to 3 TSO
- Fleet numbers: DMBSO: 51–62; TSO: 71–86
- Capacity: DMBSO: 40 seats, 40 standing TSO: 52 seats, 52 standing
- Operators: Southern Railway; British Rail Southern Region; Network SouthEast
- Depots: Waterloo (Waterloo & City line)
- Lines served: Waterloo & City line

Specifications
- Car length: 47 ft 0 in (14 3/8 m); 49 ft 1 3/4 in (14.98 m)
- Width: 8 ft 7 3/4 in (2.64 m)
- Height: 9 ft 7 in (2.92 m)
- Maximum speed: 35 mph (56 km/h)
- Traction system: Two EE 190 hp (140 kW) traction motors per DMBSO
- Power output: DMBSO: 380 hp (283 kW)
- Electric system(s): 660 V DC third rail
- Current collection: Contact shoe
- UIC classification: DMBSO: Bo′2′ TSO:2′2′
- Track gauge: 4 ft 8 1/2 in (1,435 mm) standard gauge

The British Rail Class 487 electric multiple units were built by English Electric in 1940, for use on the Waterloo & City line.

Twelve motor carriages (DMBSO), numbered 51–62, and sixteen trailers (TSO), numbered 71–86, were built. Trains were in various formations, from a single motor carriage, to pairs of motor cars with up to three intermediate trailers.

They were originally classified Class 453 under TOPS but were later reclassified Class 487.

The Waterloo & City line was operated as part of the BR Southern Region. Stock was painted in British Railways green livery, which was replaced by Rail Blue in the 1970s, a version of all over blue with grey detailing. In 1986, the line came under the ownership of Network SouthEast, and their blue, red and white livery was applied.

The Class 487 units were unique on the British Rail network for a couple of reasons. They did not feature the normal yellow ends because the route they operated was entirely in tunnels where the darkness would render them pointless and the line did not integrate at all with the rest of the network. The units were only fitted with red lights at the ends, thus the front of the train displayed two red lights instead of the more usual white.

By the 1990s the units were urgently in need of replacing. This came in the form of new Class 482 two-car units, which were delivered to traffic in 1992/93. The final Class 487 vehicles were taken by road to Glasgow for scrap, which was their single longest journey above ground. One vehicle, DMBSO no. 61, was initially stored at the National Railway Museum in York, before being transferred to the London Transport Museum's Acton Depot. This vehicle has had a major internal and external restoration by the London Transport Museum to have it in the condition it was on the day it left service in 1993.

== Gallery ==
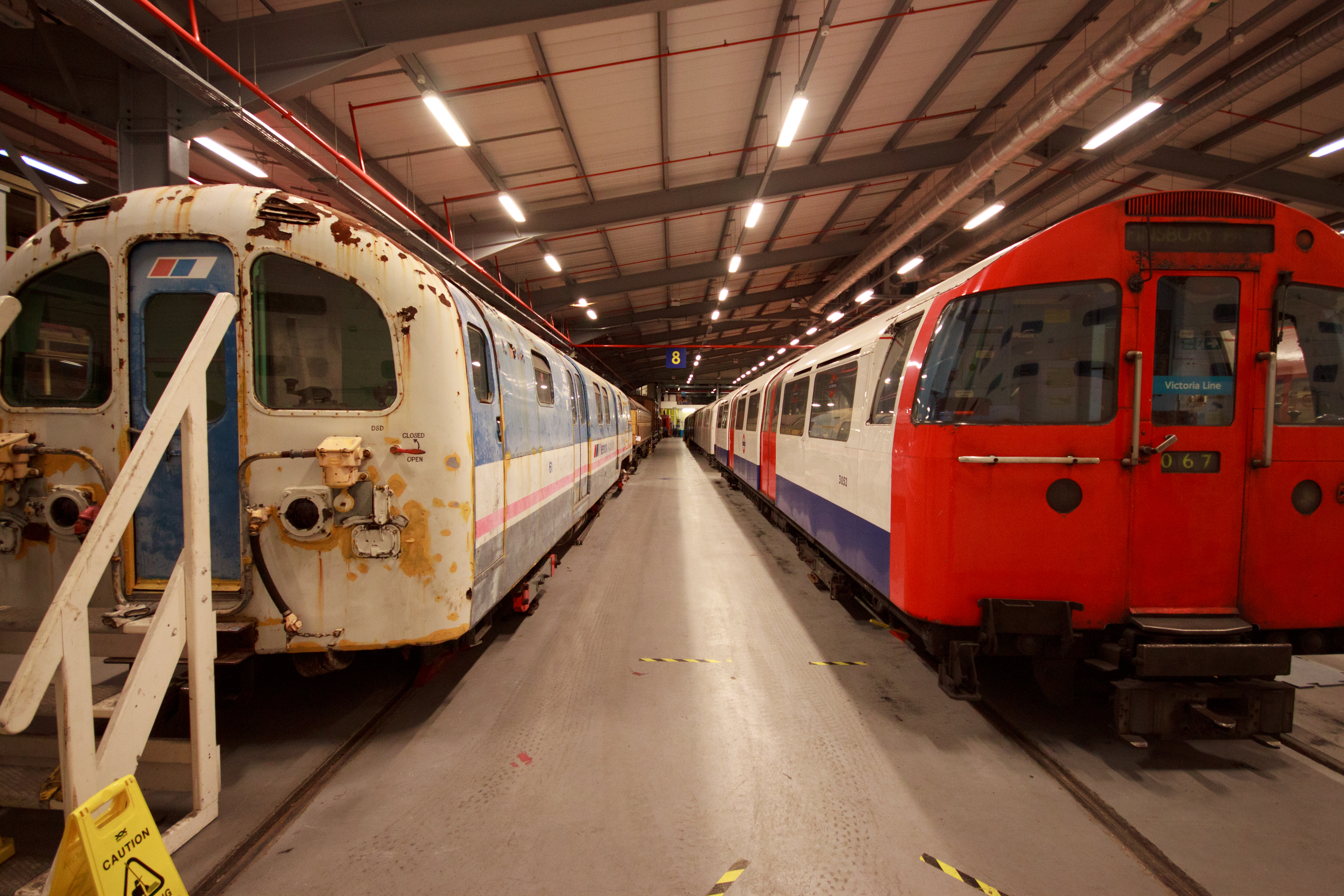
Class 487 vehicle alongside a 1967 Stock unit at the London Transport Museum depot in Acton

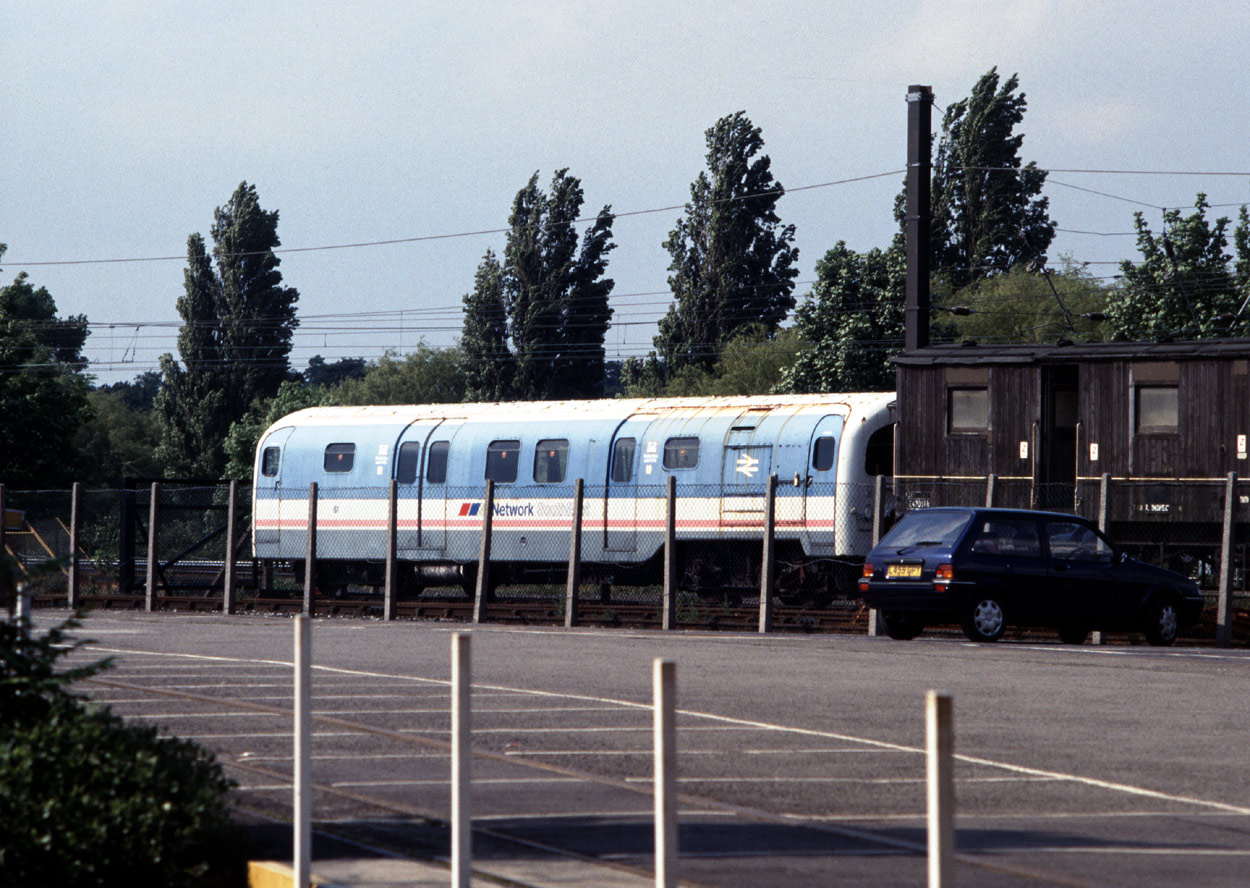
A Class 487 Waterloo & City line driving motor carriage in Network SouthEast livery being stored near to the National Railway Museum in York. These featured just three passenger doors per side - arranged as a pair and a single.

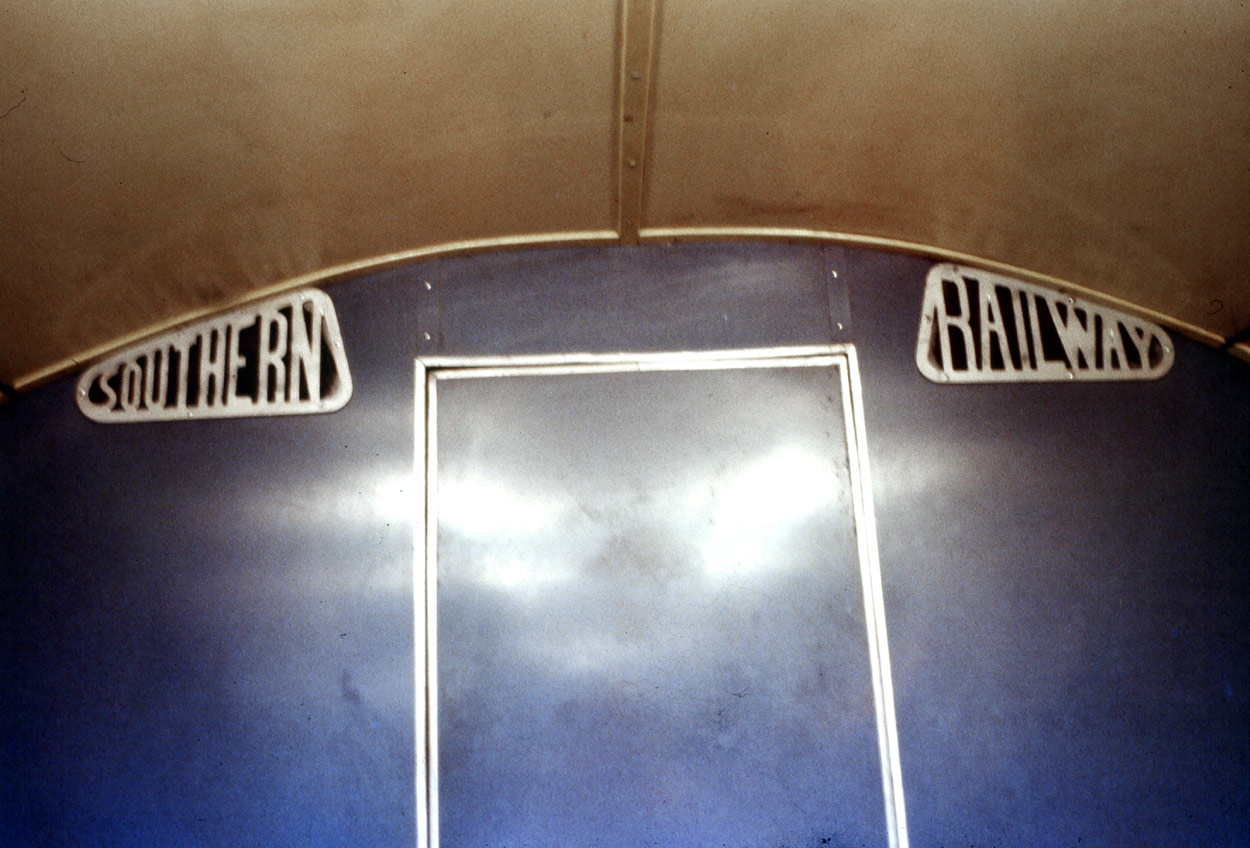
The internal air vents at the carriage ends on the Class 487 Waterloo & City line driving motor carriages featured a 'Southern Railway' logo, whilst on the trailers the logo was 'Southern Region'.

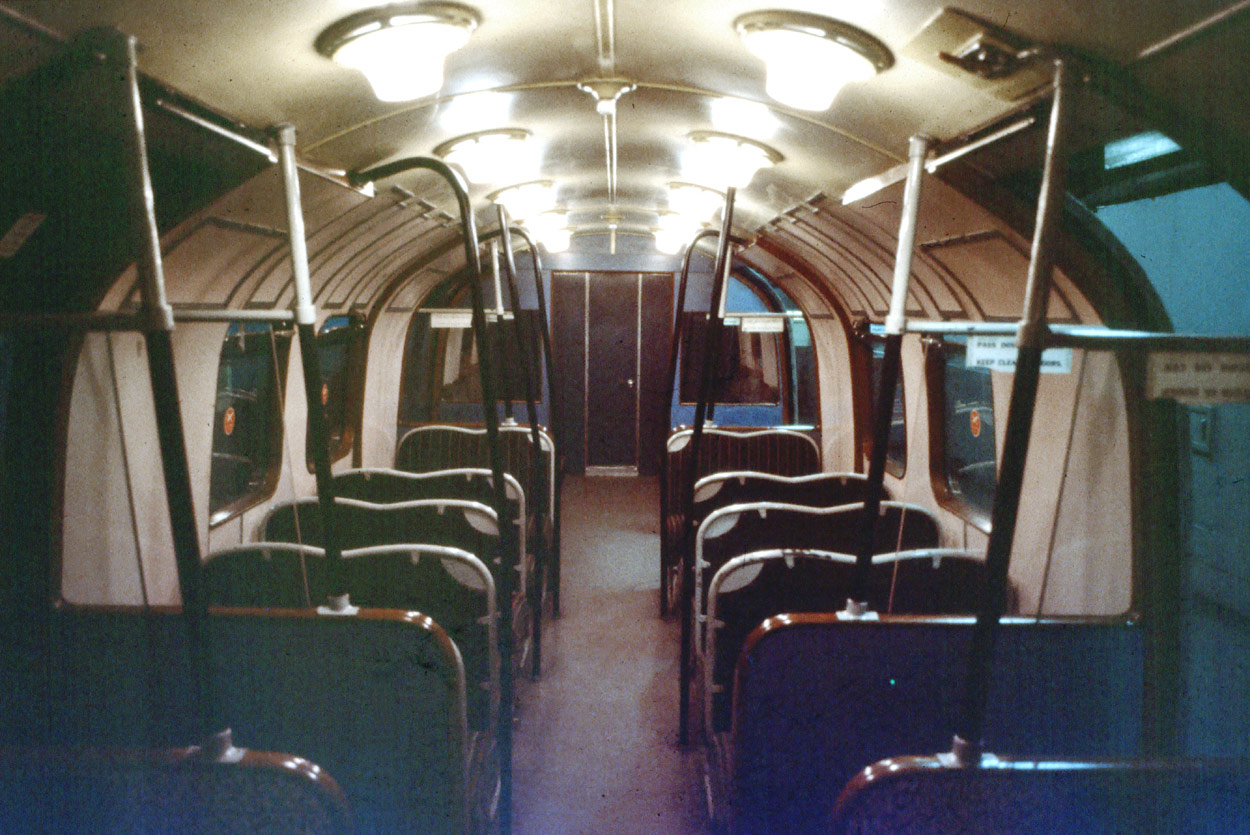
Inside a Class 487 Waterloo & City line driving motor carriage

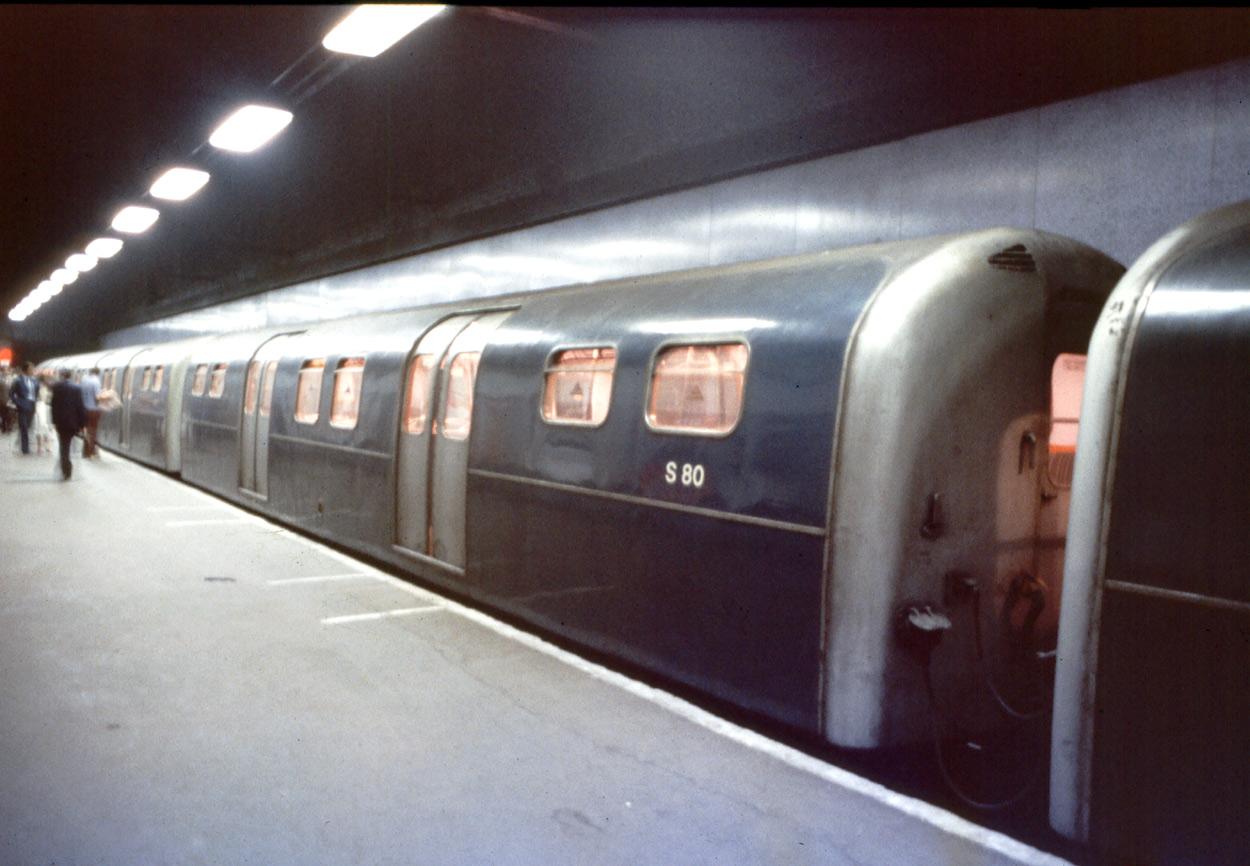
Class 487 Waterloo & City line trailer second open carriage in BR Blue. Unlike the driving motors these featured two sets of twin sliding passenger doors.

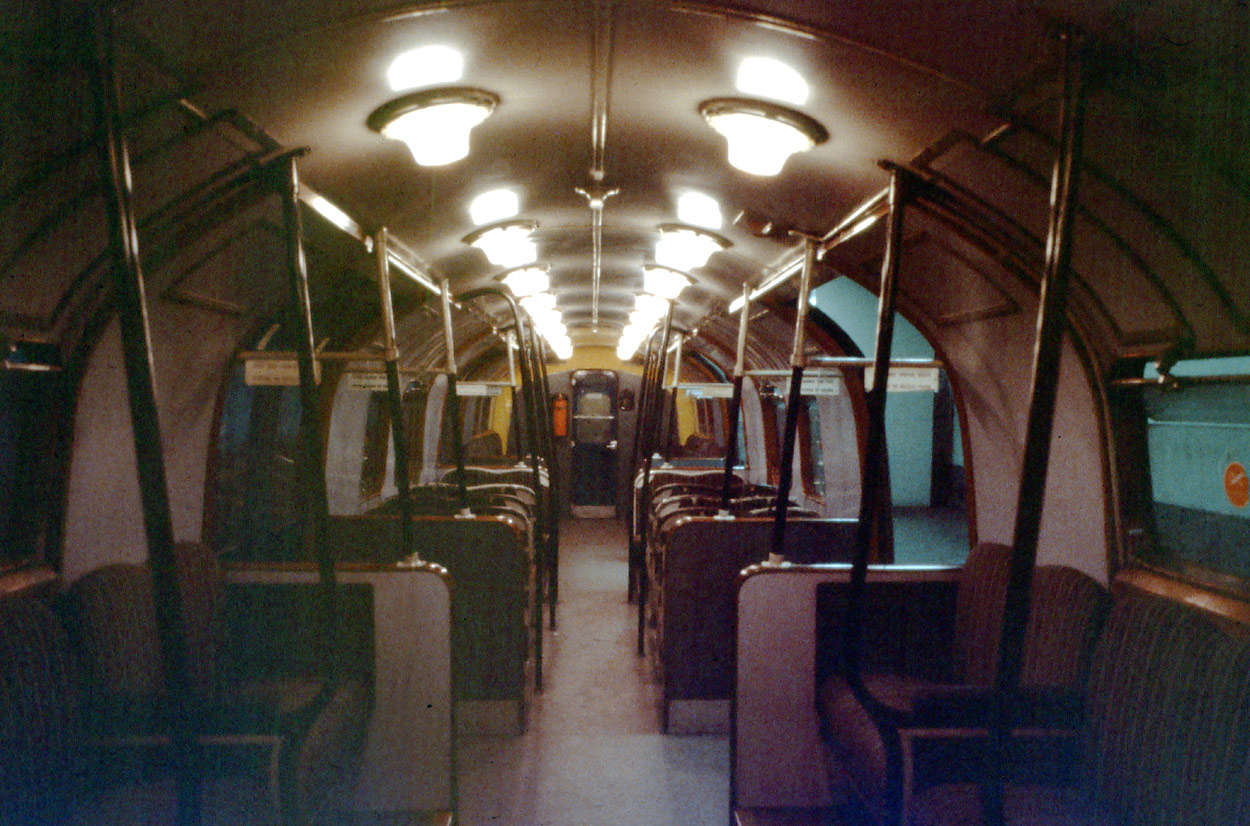
Inside a Class 487 Waterloo & City line trailer second open carriage

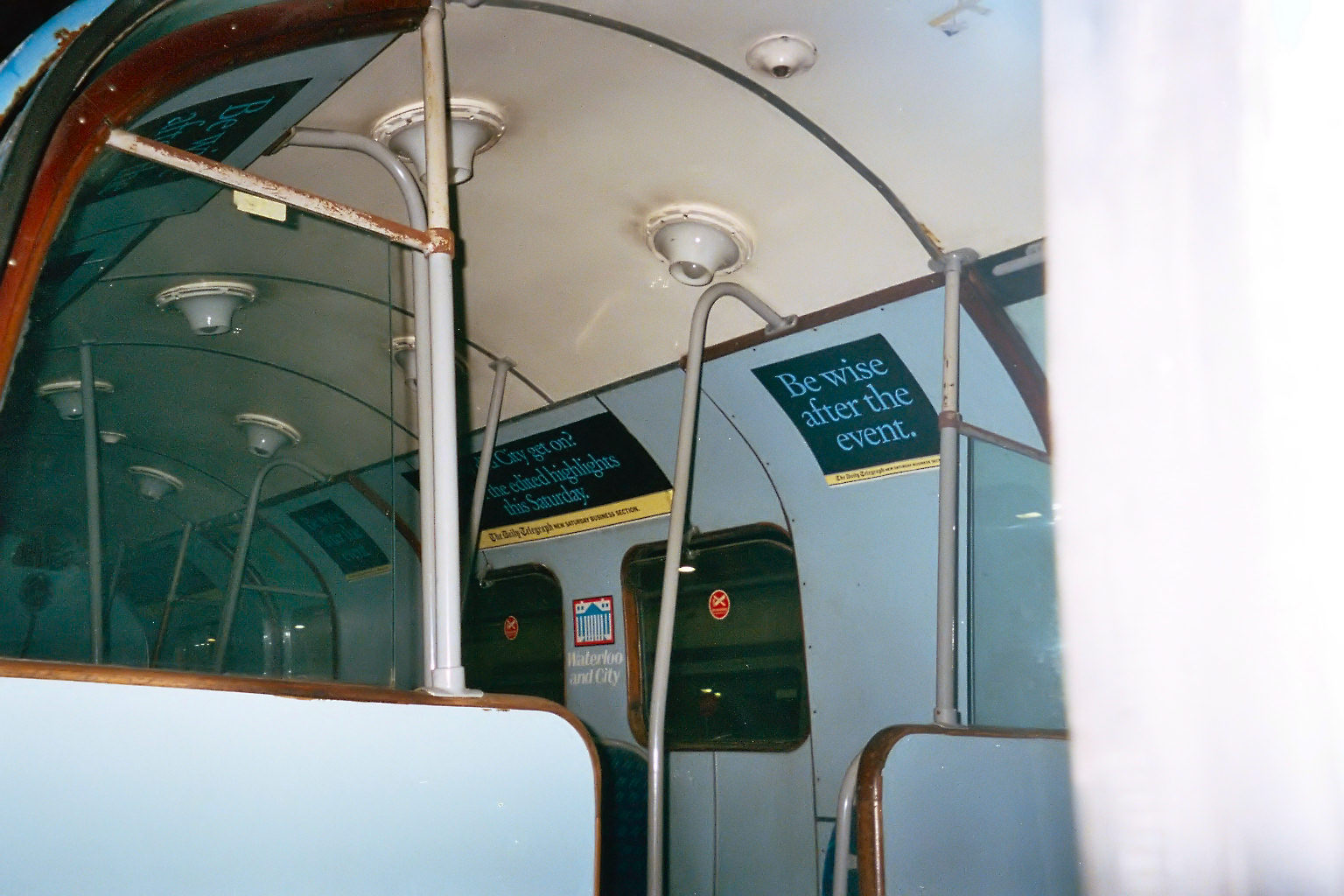
Interior of a Class 487 train

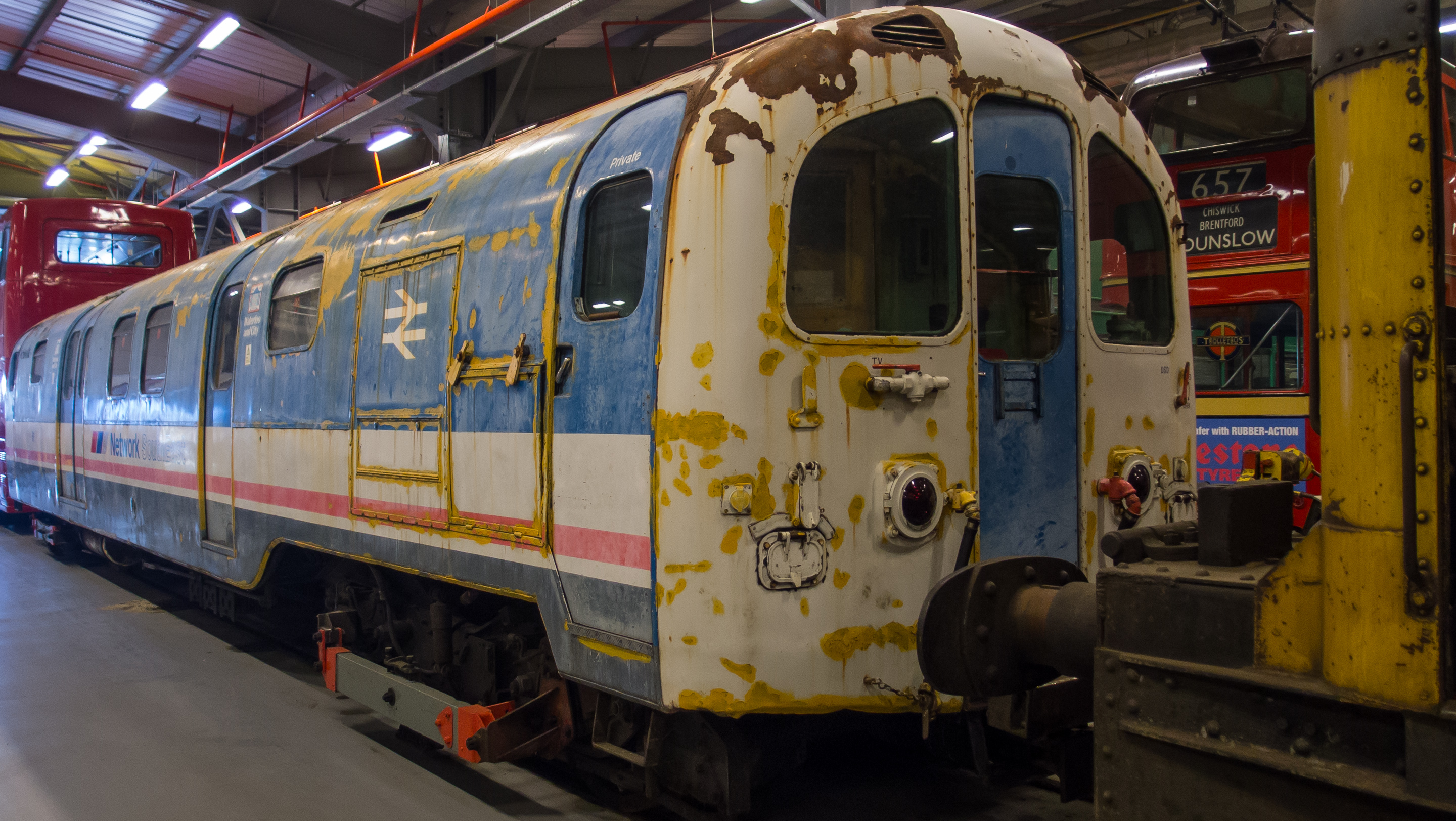
No. 61 at the LT Museum Depot

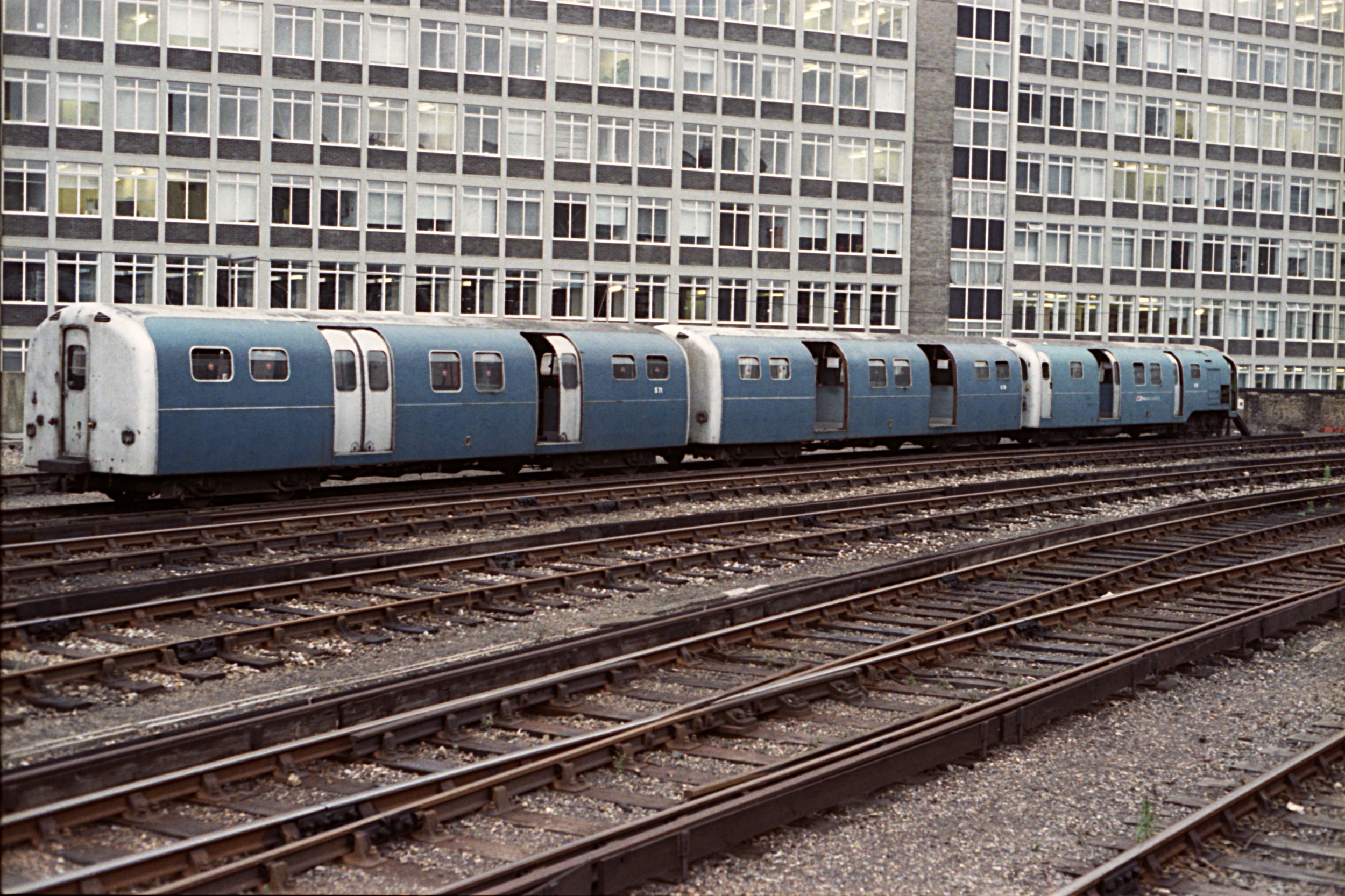
Empty Class 487 stock, at the old sidings near Waterloo station, in 1988. Two trailers and one motor coach are shown in the original painting scheme.

== Fleet Details ==
Class	Operator	No. Built	Year built	Cars per Set	Unit nos.	BR Design Code	Notes
Class 487	Southern Railway; Southern Region; Network SouthEast	12	1940	1	51-62	EB260 / SR842	DMBSO - could operate independently
Class 487	Southern Railway; Southern Region; Network SouthEast	16	1940	1	71-86	EH260 / SR846	TSO - could only operate with DMBSO
