= Waterloo & City line =

London Underground line

Waterloo & City

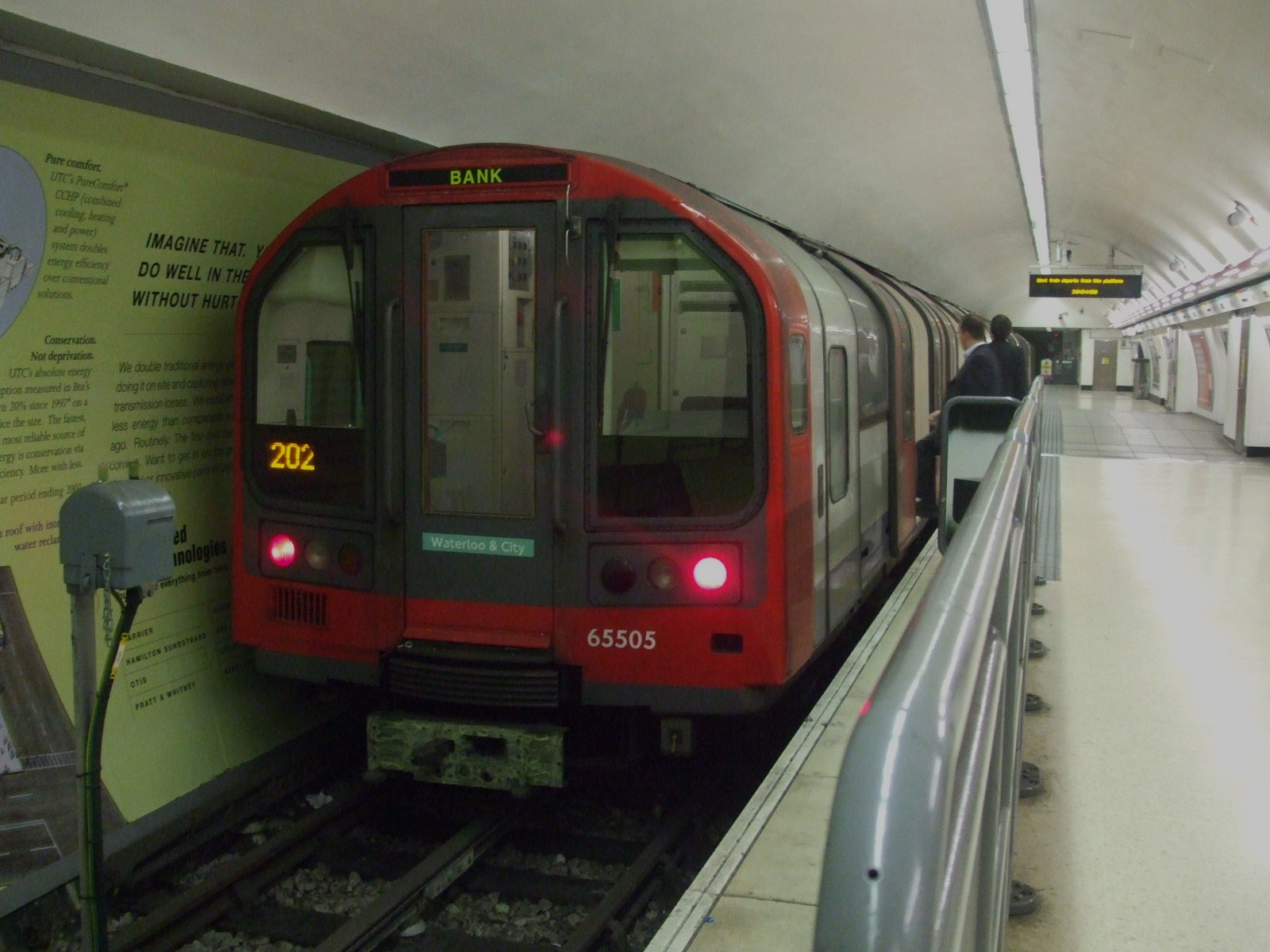
- A 1992 stock Waterloo & City line train at Bank

Overview
- Termini: Bank; Waterloo
- Stations: 2
- Colour on map: Corporate turquoise
- Website: tfl.gov.uk/tube/route/waterloo-city/

Service
- Type: Rapid transit
- System: London Underground
- Depot: Waterloo^{map 3}
- Rolling stock: 1992 Stock
- Ridership: 17.596 million (2019) passenger journeys

History
- Opened: 8 August 1898; 128 years ago (line opened); 1 April 1994; 32 years ago (transferred to London Underground)

Technical
- Line length: 2.37 km (1.47 mi)
- Character: Deep tube
- Track gauge: 1,435 mm (4 ft 8 1/2 in) standard gauge
- Electrification: Fourth rail, 750 V DC
Transport for London rail lines
London Underground
Bakerloo
Central
Circle
District
Hammersmith & City
Jubilee
Metropolitan
Northern
Piccadilly
Victoria
Waterloo & City
London Overground
Liberty
Lioness
Mildmay
Suffragette
Weaver
Windrush
Other TfL Modes
DLR
Elizabeth line
London Trams

The Waterloo & City line, colloquially known as The Drain, is a shuttle line of the London Underground which runs between Waterloo and Bank stations with no intermediate stops. Its primary traffic consists of commuters from south-west London, Surrey and Hampshire arriving at Waterloo main line station and travelling forward to the City of London financial district. For this reason, the line has historically not operated on Sundays or public holidays, except in very limited circumstances. The line was closed during the COVID-19 pandemic; since reopening in October 2021 it is open only on weekdays. It is the only fully-subterranean tube line; the Victoria line runs completely underground in passenger service but has a ground-level depot.

Printed in turquoise on the Tube map, it is by far the shortest line on the Underground network, being 2.37 km (1.47 miles) long, with an end-to-end journey lasting just four minutes. In absolute terms, it is the least-used Tube line, carrying just over 17 million passengers annually. However, in terms of the average number of journeys per kilometre it is the third-most intensively used line behind the Jubilee and Victoria lines.

The line was built by the Waterloo and City Railway Company and was opened in 1898 (at the time, Bank station was named "City"). When it opened it was the second electric underground railway in London, following the City and South London Railway (now part of the Northern line). Its construction was supported by the London and South Western Railway, whose main line trains ran into Waterloo, and for many years it continued to be owned and operated by the LSWR and its successors as a part of the national railway network, not as part of the London Underground network it resembled. Following a major refurbishment and replacement of rolling stock by Network SouthEast in the early 1990s, operations were transferred to London Underground in 1994.

== History ==
=== Background ===
The London and South Western Railway (LSWR) reached Waterloo Bridge on 11 July 1848, serving routes from Southampton and Richmond. It was officially renamed Waterloo in October 1882.

It was viewed as a serious shortcoming that the station was not within walking distance of the City of London. The LSWR had hoped to build a line eastwards to near London Bridge, but because of the slump following the railway mania, and the high cost of building through the area, this idea was abandoned. When the South Eastern Railway opened an extension from London Bridge to Charing Cross in 1864, a connecting railway line was built from there to Waterloo, but friction and competitive hostility between the companies meant the line saw no regular passenger movements. Under pressure from the LSWR, the SER constructed Waterloo Junction station, now called Waterloo East, on the Charing Cross line. The station opened in January 1869, but through ticketing was refused and the onward connection remained unsatisfactory.

==== Proposals ====
A Waterloo and Whitehall Railway was promoted in 1864, to construct a tube railway from Great Scotland Yard to Waterloo. It was to use air pressure to propel the vehicles northwards, and exhaust air to draw them southwards, using a pressure differential of 2 1/2 oz per sq in (about 11 mbar). The trains themselves would be the pistons. The company capital was to be £100,000. It was suggested that there could be a branch to where the Embankment station is now located: it is not clear how a junction would be managed in a pneumatic railway. There were to be three vehicles, one loading at each terminal and one in motion in the tube, so they must have been intended to pass at the terminals. There were to be three classes of accommodation in the coaches.

Work started on 25 October 1865, but less than a year later it was obvious that the capital was grossly inadequate. Authority for extension of time and more capital was obtained, but by then few investors had any confidence that their investment would gain a return. In 1868, a further extension was granted, but little further work was done, and nearly all the money had gone.

In 1881, an independent Waterloo and City Railway was promoted, to build a surface line to Queen Street. The cost was formidable at £2.3 million, and the proposal soon collapsed.

==== The Waterloo and City Railway Bill ====
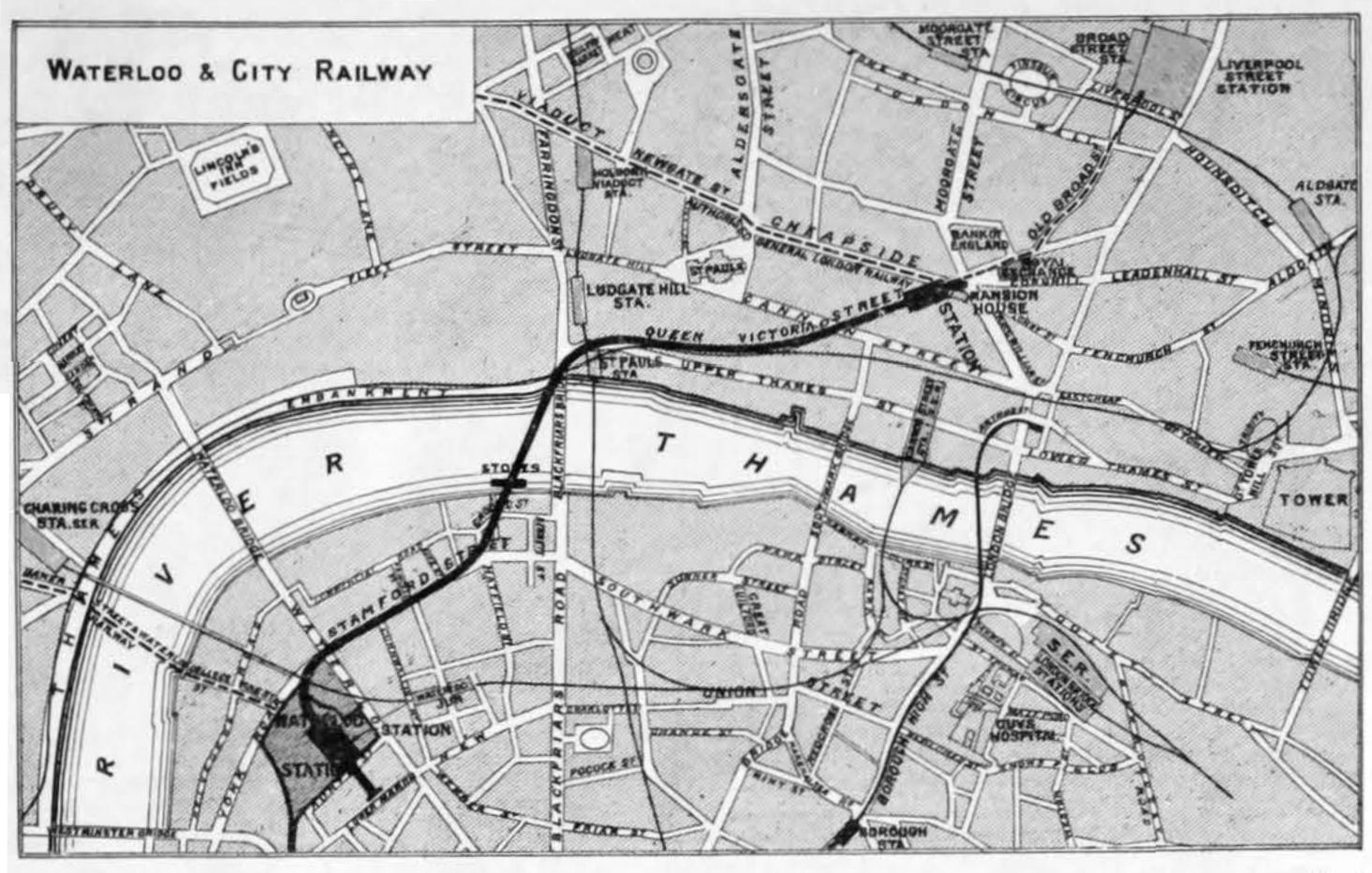
Map of the Waterloo and City Railway as originally planned

In 1891, the Corporation of the City of London made a statistical survey which it published ancillary to the National Census taken in that year. 37,694 persons lived in the City, but the daytime occupation was 310,384. On 4 May 1891, 1,186,094 entries to the City were made, i.e., many people entered more than once. Separate statistical information is that about 50,000 persons arrived at Waterloo daily, of whom about 12,000 proceeded to the City by some means.

In November 1891, a bill was deposited to build an underground electric railway from Waterloo to the Mansion House in the City; the capital was to be £500,000; the proposal was supported by the LSWR but was independent. Three other "tube" railways were proposed in the same parliamentary session, the traditional cut-and-cover method being seen as impractical, as was an elevated railway on viaduct. Electric urban railways had been introduced in Germany in 1891 and in the United States of America, and were in daily, widespread use; but in the United Kingdom, only one example was in existence, the City and South London Railway.

The progress of the bill through Parliament was slow, partly because of the novelty of considering tube railway schemes; there were several petitions from the authorities responsible for public works in the city. London County Council tried to insist that the tubes should be made large enough to carry ordinary trains, and that all trains arriving at Waterloo should continue through them to the City. This idea would have required a new subterranean terminal station at the Bank of at least equal size to Waterloo itself.

Waterloo and City Railway Act 1893
- Act of Parliament
- Parliament of the United Kingdom
- Long title: An Act for incorporating the Waterloo and City Railway Company and for empowering them to construct an Underground Railway from near Waterloo Station to Mansion House Street City and for other purpose.
- Citation: 56 & 57 Vict. c. clxxxvii

Dates
- Royal assent: 27 July 1893

Text of statute as originally enacted

Numerous petitions against the bill, or requiring additional protections to be included in it, were presented, but eventually on 27 July 1893, the Waterloo and City Railway Act 1893 (56 & 57 Vict. c. clxxxvii) gained royal assent.

==== Construction ====
Following royal assent, the company prepared for construction. The new company issued its prospectus in March 1894 and the subscription list closed on 21 April; 54,000 shares at £10 each were offered and there was a slight over-subscription. A dividend of 3% per annum payable out of capital was promised during the construction phase.

Tenders were acquired for the main tunnel work, and a contract was awarded to John Mowlem & Co for the sum of £229,064 (equivalent to £25,740,000 in 2025). The consulting engineers were W. R. Galbraith (of the LSWR) and J. H. Greathead, developer of the tunnelling shield. The resident engineer was H. H. Dalrymple-Hay. Mowlems' engineer in charge was William Rowell.

Mowlem began work on 18 June 1894, first building staging in the river about 500 feet (150 m) west of Blackfriars Bridge. Piles were driven for a cofferdam and two vertical shafts of 16 feet (4.9 m) internal diameter were constructed as headings for the tunnel drive. The average depth of the tunnels is about 45 feet (14 m), with its deepest points under the River Thames, at 63 feet (19 m) underground.

Driving the running tunnels started in November 1894, using the Greathead system of shield excavation, cast iron segment lining, compressed air working, and compressed air grouting behind the tunnel lining. Twenty men worked in each heading.

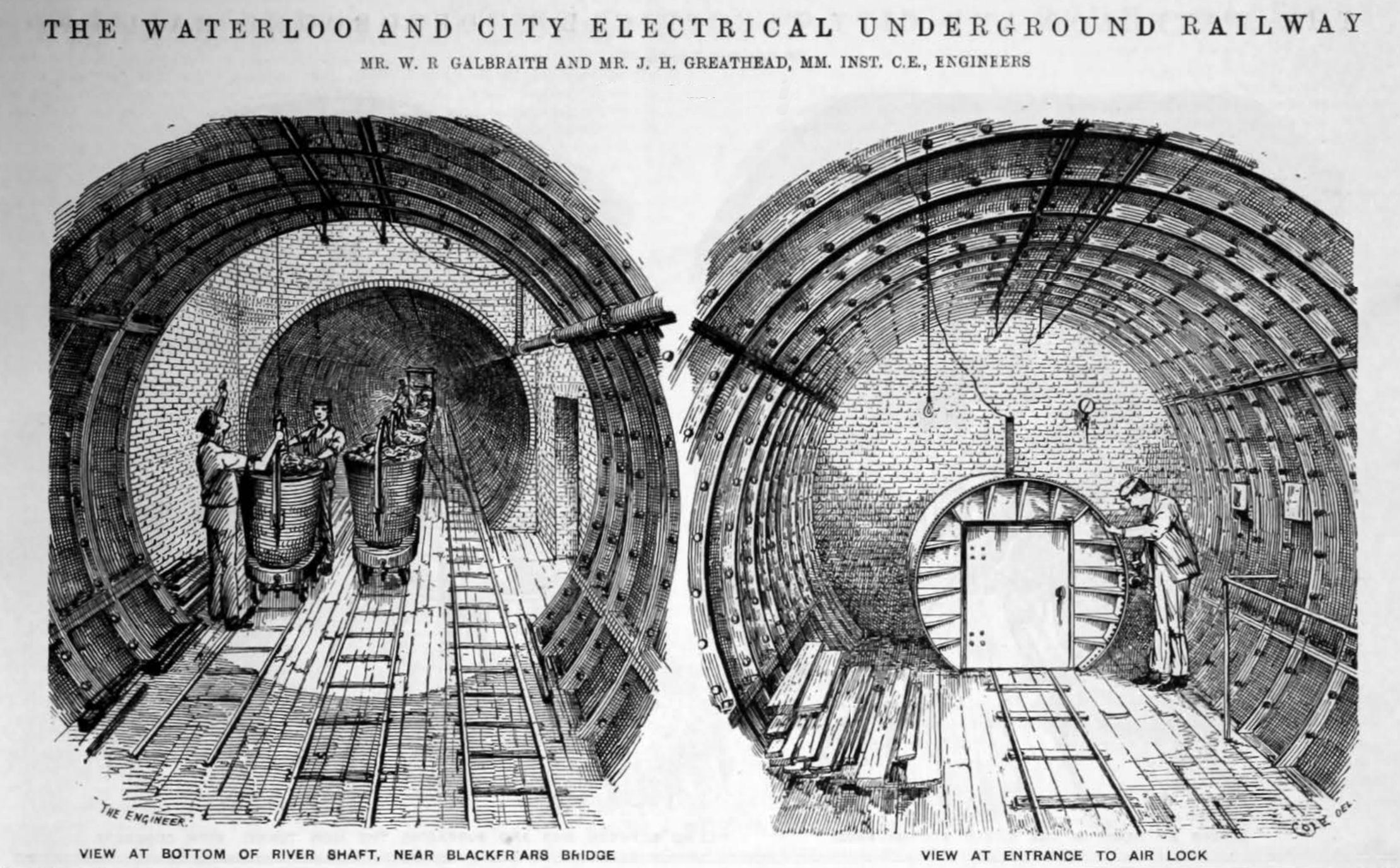
Removal of spoil in tunnelling the Waterloo and City Railway

The excavated material was removed from the staging near Blackfriars Bridge; it was conveyed there from the shields by a narrow gauge railway using electric locomotives supplied by the Siemens Company. Two were in use and a third was on order at August 1895. They operated on 18-inch (460 mm) gauge track with a twin overhead trolley wire (i.e., not using the track for current return) at 200 V DC.

The station works at Waterloo were constructed by Perry and Co. The station tracks run in separate but adjacent arches supporting the main line station, which run transversely to the main line track. The arch piers needed to be underpinned to about 8 feet (2.4 m) lower than the original foundations.

==== Civil engineering ====
Under the Thames the top of the tube is 23 feet (7.0 m) below the bed of the river. The total length of the line is 1 mile 1,012 yards (2,535 m).

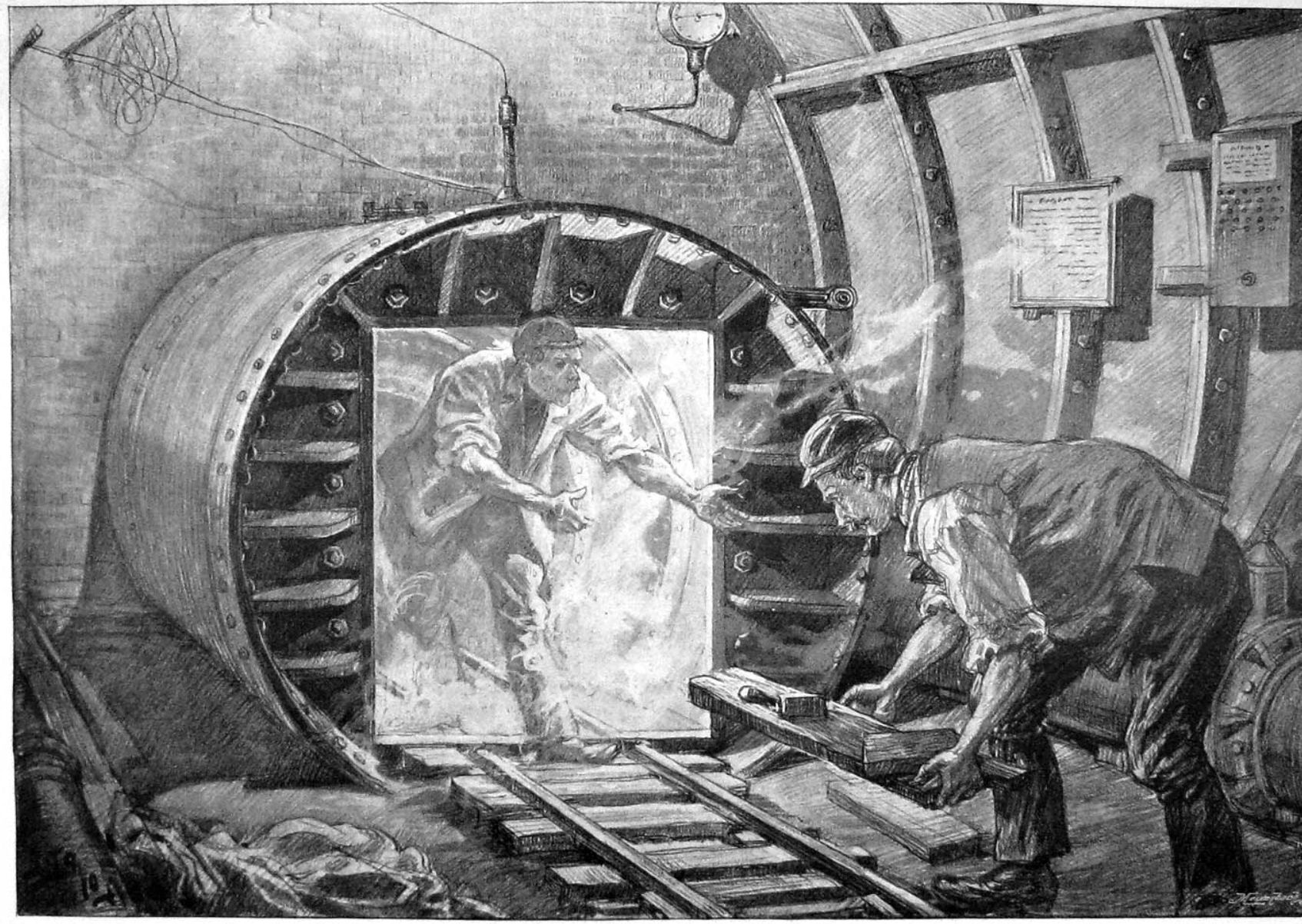
The air lock used during compressed air working

The underground station at Waterloo was located within the existing transverse arches of the main line station, with the arrival and departure platforms in separate arches, and a staircase access. Siding accommodation and a reversing siding were provided beyond the platforms: after disembarkation of passengers, an arriving train would continue forward to the reversing sidings, and then return to the departure platform. An additional lay-by siding was provided later.

At the new City station there were two platforms and either could be used by an arriving train, reversing in the platform. The track connections at the approach were a double slip, not a scissors, so a train could not leave while another was arriving. The left hand platform line was extended by a train length and trains could be stabled in the extension. A large diameter Greathead shield was used to bore the section of tunnel where the track connections would be installed.

The tube section for the platform lines at the City station were 23 feet (7.0 m) in diameter, the largest in the world at the time.

==== Original signalling ====
In late 1897, contracts were let for the signalling equipment; the electric interlocking was to be carried out by W. R. Sykes, who had a call-off contract with the LSWR; a supplement to their standard prices for the tunnel work was agreed.

There were signal boxes at Waterloo at the south end of the northbound platform, and at south end of the northbound platform at City. There were conventional semaphore signals in the open south of Waterloo station, but all other signals were electric lights only. Sykes' lock-and-block system was used with depression-type treadles. Although there was only one signal section, advance starting signals were provided. The platform starting signals at Waterloo and at City had a lower arm, a "shunt-by signal" which when lowered indicated that the line was clear only to the advance starting signal. The main starting signal when lowered indicated that the line was clear to City.

An electrical traction current interrupt system was installed; a short length of contact bar was provided at each signal, connected to earth when the signal was at danger, and otherwise isolated. A "slipper" contact was fitted on the trains, and if it contacted the contact bar when it was earthed, the traction current was tripped.

==== Traction electricity ====
On 4 January 1897, a contract was signed with Siemens and Co for the electrical generating and distribution equipment, and the electrical train equipment, for £55,913. Although a German firm, Siemens had a large presence in the UK at the time. There were three lower tenders.

There were five boilers working at 180 psi (1,200 kPa) driving five (later six) high speed steam engines developing 360 hp (270 kW) directly coupled to dynamos. The two-pole compound-wound dynamos delivered 500 V at no load and 530 V under full load; this gave 302 hp (225 kW) at 350 rpm. Special attention was given to the closeness of the governing to ensure a stable supply voltage. The station lighting circuits were fed from the main switchboard and specially led to maintain lighting supply in the event of a traction current disruption. Station lighting used four lamps in series, with return current via the running rails. (Gas lighting was provided as a back-up.)

There was a short high-level siding within the Waterloo yard area; coal to fuel the boilers was brought in by ordinary LSWR wagons lowered to the running line by the carriage lift; the wagons were drawn through the northbound platform by an electric shunting locomotive, and another lift elevated them to the siding. Boiler ash was disposed of correspondingly.

==== City station ====
The City station was not originally called Bank. The Central London Railway (CLR, which became the central section of what is now the Central line) obtained the Central London Railway Act 1891 (54 & 55 Vict. c. cxcvi) varying their previously intended route, to take them to the area of the present-day Bank station. The act required them to construct a central station and booking office and public subways connecting the surrounding streets. The subways were to be regarded as public, although maintained by the CLR. Any other railway intending to have a station nearby was entitled to connect to the CLR station by subways. This obviously referred to the Waterloo & City line, and was designed to create a single station frontage in the congested street area. The CLR completed its construction after the W&CR but was obliged to finish the facilities necessary for the earlier opening of the W&CR. The City and South London Railway (CSLR) also operated from the station.

Gillham says:

"Right from the start the joint station and circular subway area was always known as the 'City station' by the W&C but as the 'Bank station' by the CLR and the CSLR."

The W&CR station was located some considerable distance from the area near street level, and this later led to persistent complaints as it required passengers to climb a steep and lengthy gradient to reach the exit.

==== Permanent way ====
The ordinary LSWR permanent way was used, with 87-pound-per-yard (43 kg/m) rails, but in the tubes longitudinal timbers were used instead of cross-sleepers. The sharp curves had check rails. Cross-bonds paralleling the running rails electrically were provided every 100 feet (30 m) and between tracks at the cross passages. The track gauge was the standard 4 ft 8 1/2 in (1,435 mm).

The conductor rail was a steel inverted channel placed centrally, with its upper surface at the same level as the upper surface of the running rails. At pointwork a hardwood ramp was provided to raise the collector shoes 1 1/2 inches (38 mm) above running rail level.

==== Shunting locomotives ====
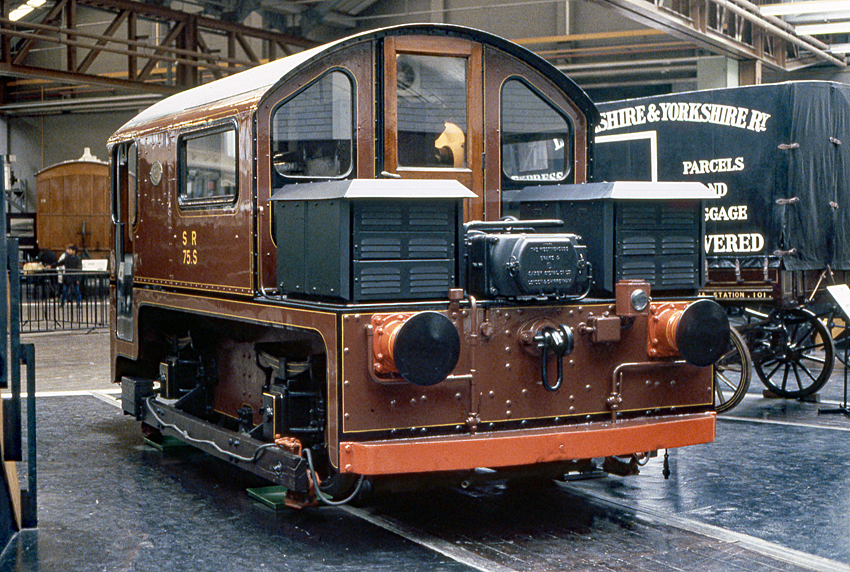
75S, Siemens electric shunter

Part of Siemens's work under the supply of electrical equipment including a shunting locomotive; this was a four-wheel electric locomotive with a cab at one end only, It had two 60 hp (45 kW) traction motors and was delivered in 1898. Its main duty was the delivery of the generator station coal. Like the passenger vehicles, its brake system had air reservoirs charged from a static supply at Waterloo. It remained on the system until 1968.

In 1901, a second, more powerful shunting locomotive was acquired. Designed by the LSWR Chief Mechanical Engineer, Dugald Drummond it had two four wheel bogies and was intended for the rescue of failed passenger trains in the tunnel. In 1915, it was removed from the tunnel and put to work shunting coal wagons at Durnsford Road power station, having had its shoe collectors altered for the surface traction supply system.

==== The Armstrong Lift ====
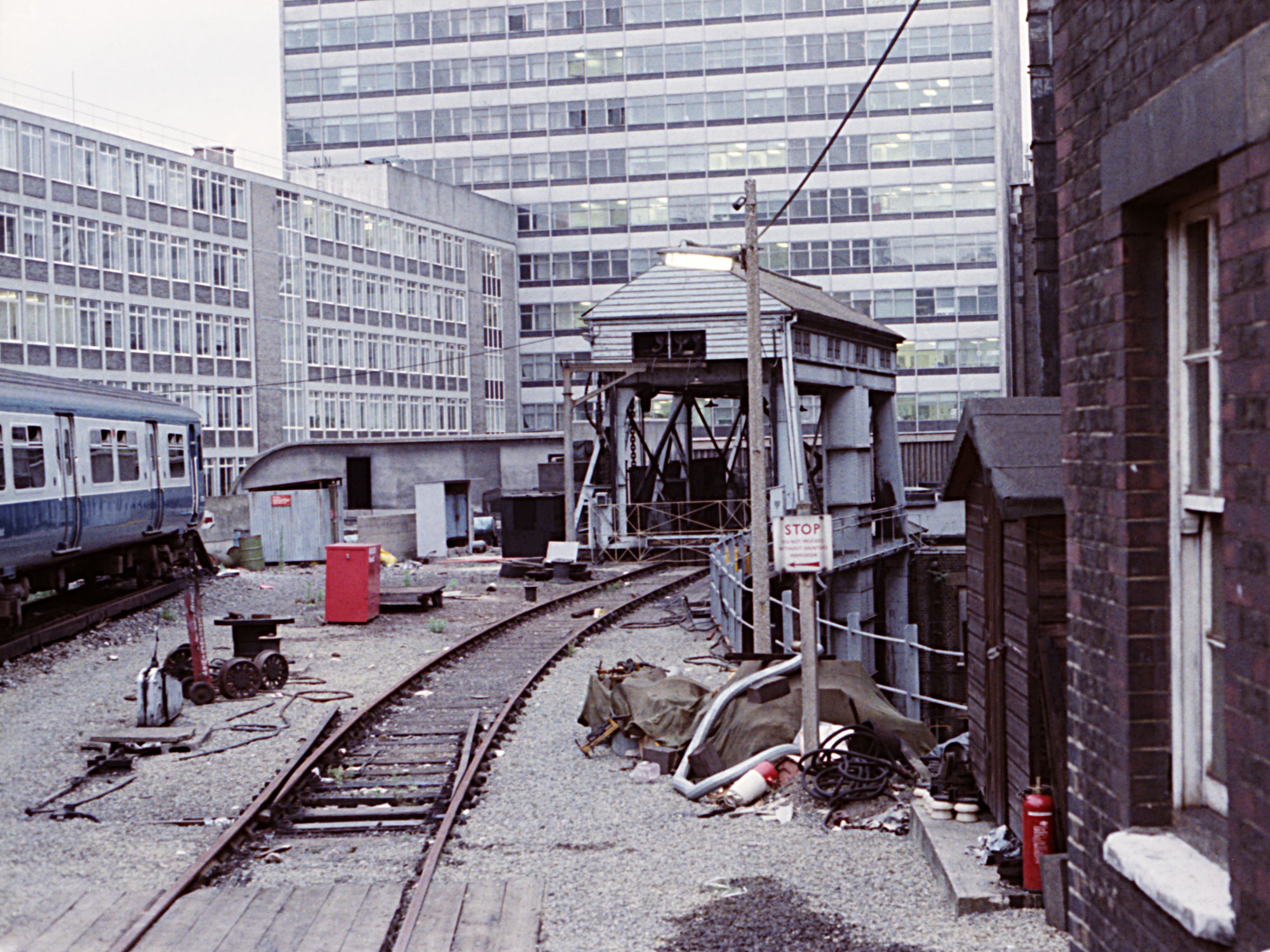
The Armstrong lift in 1988.

As the line had no connection to any other line, nor any ground level section, it was necessary to provide a hoist to bring the passenger cars to the line, and to get them out for heavy maintenance. This was provided to the west of the Windsor side (NW side) of Waterloo main line station, and was known as the Armstrong lift, after the manufacturer, Sir W G Armstrong Whitworth & Co Ltd, who was paid £3,560. It was operated by water power; at the time of construction hydraulic power was commonly used in urban areas, supplied by utility companies, to operate hoists and lifts. The lift was to be capable of lifting 30 short tons (27 t). It was completed in April 1898. There was a smaller 25-short-ton (23 t) hoist within the low-level siding area at Waterloo for the boiler fuel wagons; this had a smaller travel and was installed by John Abbot & Co for £595.

=== The line in operation ===
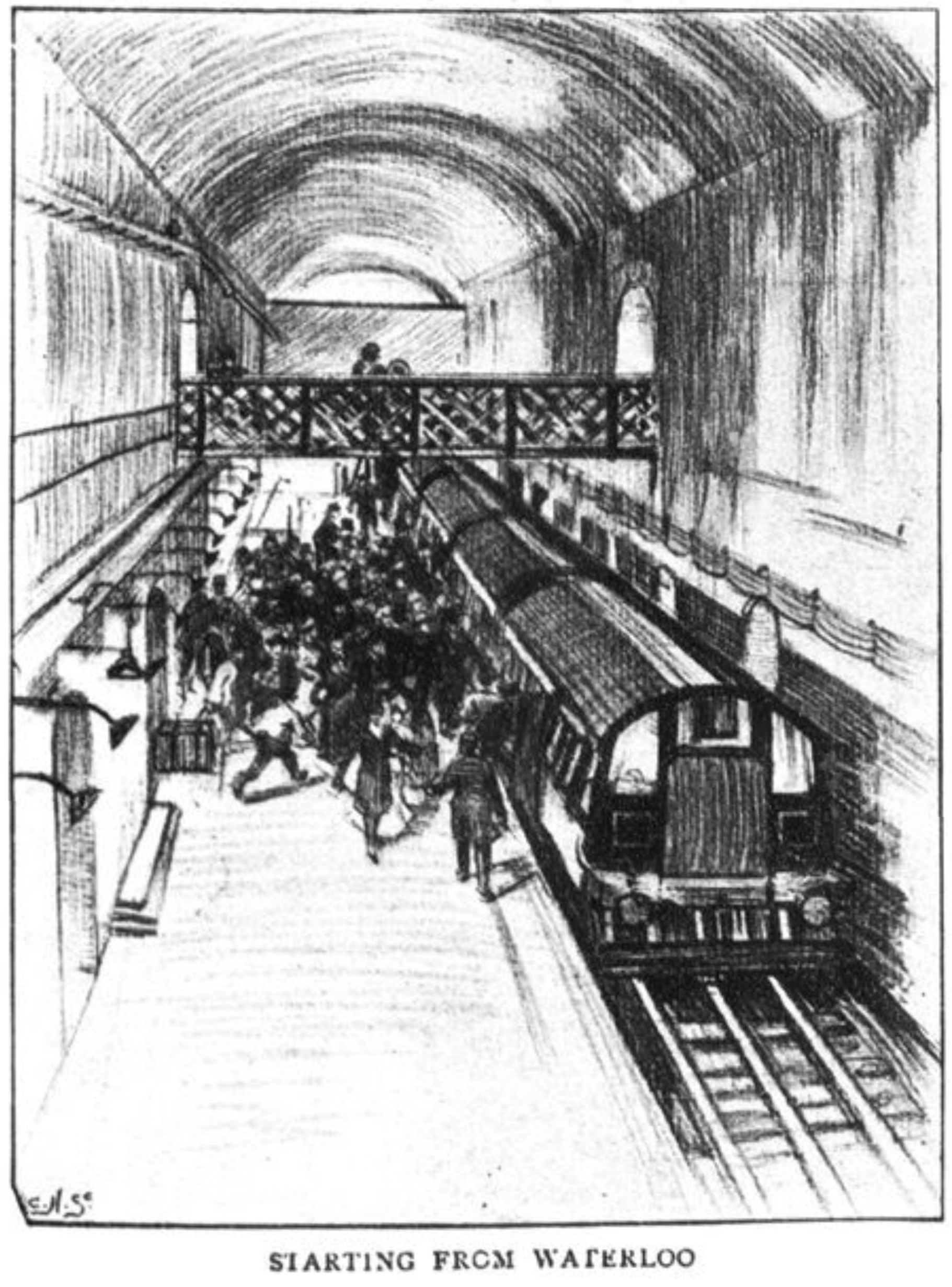
Artist's impression of Waterloo station at opening to the public

Once works were complete and the Board of Trade inspecting officer had passed the line as fit, Prince George, Duke of Cambridge formally opened the line on 11 July 1898.

The Waterloo and City Railway opened to the public at 8 a.m. on Monday 8 August 1898, with a train leaving each terminal simultaneously. The fares were 2d one class only, payable at a turnstile, but returns and season tickets, and add-ons to surface tickets were available. From 1900, the turnstiles were removed and conductors travelled on the trains, carrying Bell Punch ticket machines. The daily average receipts in January 1899 were £86, and with steadily rising passenger usage and income the company was able to pay a 3% dividend out of income following the annual general meeting of February 1902. Sunday services were not considered at this period, and in 1906 it was stated that "it would cost £20 each Sunday to run the trains, and they would not get that back in receipts."

Very soon after operation, it was realised that the line was running to capacity at the business peaks, then referred to as the rush, and very lightly used for the remainder of the day. Accordingly, in the spring of 1899 an order was placed with Dick, Kerr & Co. for five new motor cars for single operation. The driving cabs were half width; the traction motors, two per car, were 75 hp (56 kW) nose suspended with single reduction gear. As with the earlier cars, the air brake reservoir was charged from static equipment at Waterloo. Five of these single cars were delivered in February 1900 and entered service in the spring. From that time, they alone worked the off-peak service, and the original vehicles only worked the peak services.

=== Absorption by the LSWR ===
The line had been worked by the LSWR from the outset, and in 1906 the LSWR made overtures to the W&CR concerning an outright absorption. It was suggested at an extraordinary general meeting of the W&CR that increasing competition motivated the LSWR. Powers were included in the South Western Railway Act 1906 (6 Edw. 7. c. lxxxv) passed on 20 July 1906, and shareholders' approval was obtained. The transfer took place on 1 January 1907, with the shareholders receiving LSWR shares, and the W&CR ceased to exist.

In 1915, the LSWR started electrifying its suburban routes, and for this purpose it built a large generating station at Durnsford Road, Wimbledon. The power for train operation on the Waterloo & City line was supplied from this from December 1915, and the original W&CR generating plant now served only ancillary purposes in the line, but also heating and lighting of the main LSWR Waterloo offices. The traction voltage on the W&CR was increased from the original 550 V to 600 V.

In 1921, it had been considered desirable to augment train lengths at the busy periods, and four new trailer coaches to the original specification were built at Eastleigh; 24 five-car trains were run per hour at the busiest times.

=== Southern Railway ===
By the Railways Act 1921, the main line railway companies of Great Britain were grouped into four companies, effective at the beginning of 1923. The LSWR was now part of the Southern Railway. Due to the Waterloo & City's status as part of one of the "Big Four" railway companies, it was not taken over by the London Passenger Transport Board (LPTB) at the latter's formation in 1933, making the W&C the only tube railway in London not to fall under the control of the LPTB. Despite this anomaly, the line was included on most versions of the Underground map produced by the LPTB and its successors up until the line's absorption into the London Underground network in 1994.

In 1934, the LPTB proposed that the Waterloo & City should have a new intermediate station at Blackfriars, connecting with the District line station there. They further proposed that the Waterloo & City line should be extended to Liverpool Street station and Shoreditch, the trains there continuing over the East London Railway to New Cross and New Cross Gate. It is not clear whether the scheme had been costed, but nothing came of it.

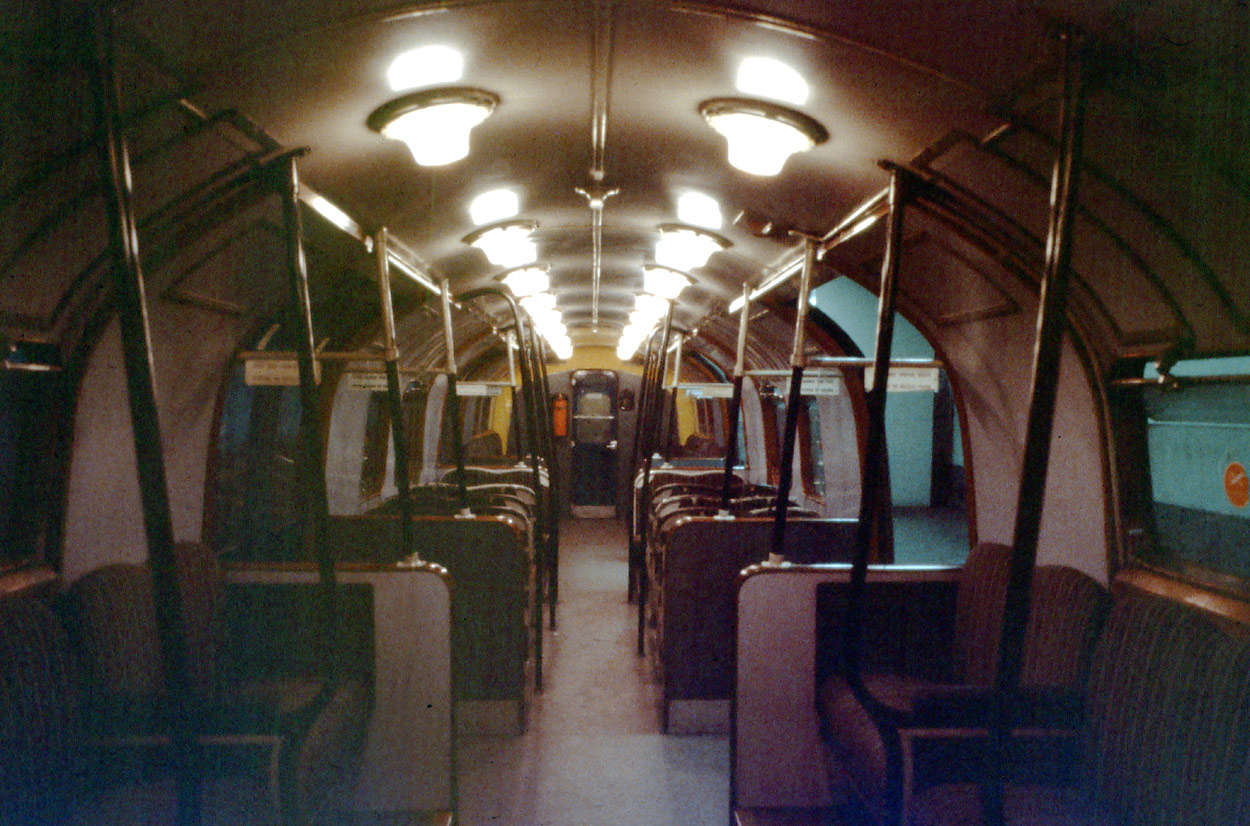
Interior of the Art Deco styled Class 487 trains

==== New rolling stock ====
In 1937, the Southern Railway carried out a thorough review of the technical aspects of the line, now 40 years old. This led to an immediate proposal to order new rolling stock in five-car formations, in association with the provision of escalators at the City station. The scheme was delayed and the declaration of war on 3 September 1939 led to cancellation of the escalator scheme. However, the rolling stock order was proceeded with, and the Art Deco style trains were delivered in 1940, later classified as Class 487.

The original central third rail to power the trains was replaced by a Southern Railway standard steel rail placed outside the running rails. Automatic signalling with train stops was also provided. The City signal box was abolished, and fully automatic working implemented there; the lay-by sidings were abolished. The new stock did not require travelling conductors, and tickets were issued at the terminals. When the line reopened with new trains on 28 October 1940, the City station was renamed Bank in conformity with the usage of the LPTB there.

=== British Railways ===
On 1 January 1948, the Southern Railway, as well as the other main line railways of Great Britain, was nationalised, forming British Railways.

On 13 April 1948, there was a serious accident at the Waterloo Armstrong Lift: coal was still being taken down to the original generating station which powered station offices at Waterloo. A shunt of wagons was being propelled onto the lift at the upper level; four pawls were supposed to be engaged to provide partial support to the lift table, but it appears that some had not engaged. The table tilted, drawing the wagons and M7 locomotive number 672 onto the table; the table and the entire shunt including the locomotive fell down the shaft. The locomotive and wagons were cut up in situ.

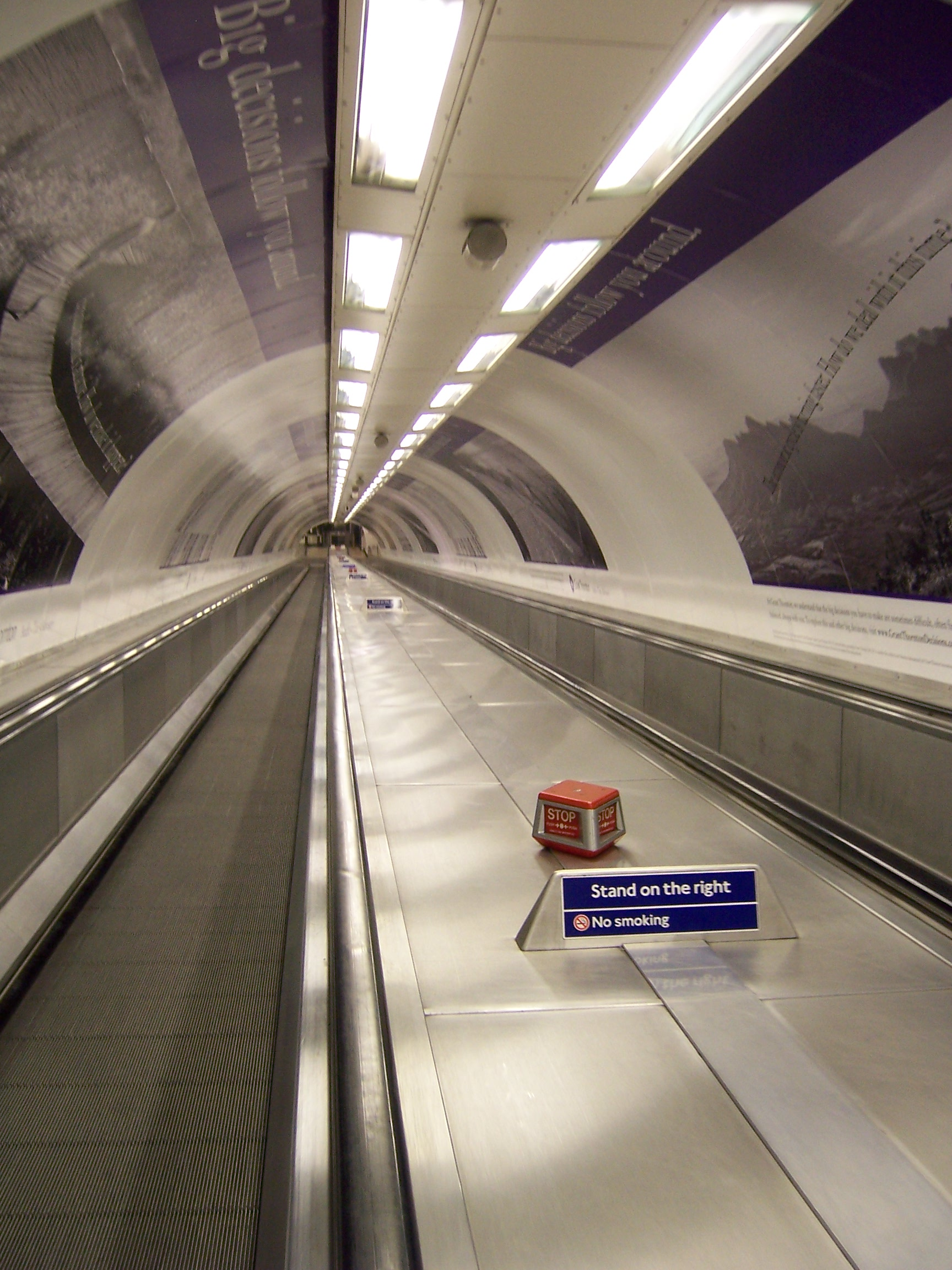
Moving walkway at Bank station

==== The Travolator ====
When the line was built, the platforms at Bank (then known as City) were located a considerable distance from the surface exits, and a long sloping tunnel had to be negotiated on foot. This led to constant complaints, and from 1929 there were many proposals to improve the arrangements, as passenger numbers increased, adding congestion to the physical exertion. The proposals had included new escalators, direct connection to adjacent Central London Railway (later Central line) platforms, and new, closer, tunnelled exits.

In the 1950s, a Speedwalk system of people movers consisting of a continuous rubber belt system, was implemented in certain American cities. After considerable delay considering this and alternatives, British Railways let a contract on 4 July 1957 for the civil engineering works in driving a new sloping access tunnel, in which a pair of travolators (at the time often written Trav-O-Lator) would be installed by Waygood Otis. Otis did not, at this stage, gain a contract.

However, as work was getting under way, the government imposed heavy cuts in capital expenditure on the railways, and after considerable deliberation, it was decided once again to defer alleviation of the problem; no financial benefit was anticipated from the scheme, whereas competing schemes would significantly reduce operational costs. The consulting engineers were directed to suspend work on 11 December 1957, although some enabling work, particularly a sewer diversion, proceeded.

The financial restrictions were not long-lasting, and on 10 July 1958 it was announced that the work would resume. It progressed without further major difficulties. The new installation was formally opened by the Lord Mayor of London on 27 September 1960, and came into public use immediately. There were two parallel travolators, each with a moving surface having 488 platform sections each 40 by 16 inches (1,020 mm × 410 mm); the whole length is 302 feet (92 m) on an inclination of 1 in 7 (about 14.3%). There was a moving handrail. In the morning peak both travolators would operate upwards, with arriving passengers being required to walk down the original ramps; at other times one travolator operated in each direction. The original Otis Trav-O-Lators have since been replaced by CNIM machines.

In association with the work, some improvements were made to the station environment at the Waterloo station, and a 2 1/2 minute frequency was implemented in the peaks; this involved some minor signalling changes, reversion to alternating platform use at Bank, and the use of turnover drivers and guards (where the arriving driver and guard are replaced by staff waiting at the appropriate place for the change of direction, sometimes referred to as "stepping up"). A Rear Cab Clear plunger is provided at Bank so that the arriving driver can confirm that he is clear of the cab and the "step-back" driver can depart when the signal clears. Overall, the work had cost £910,500.

==== Network SouthEast ====
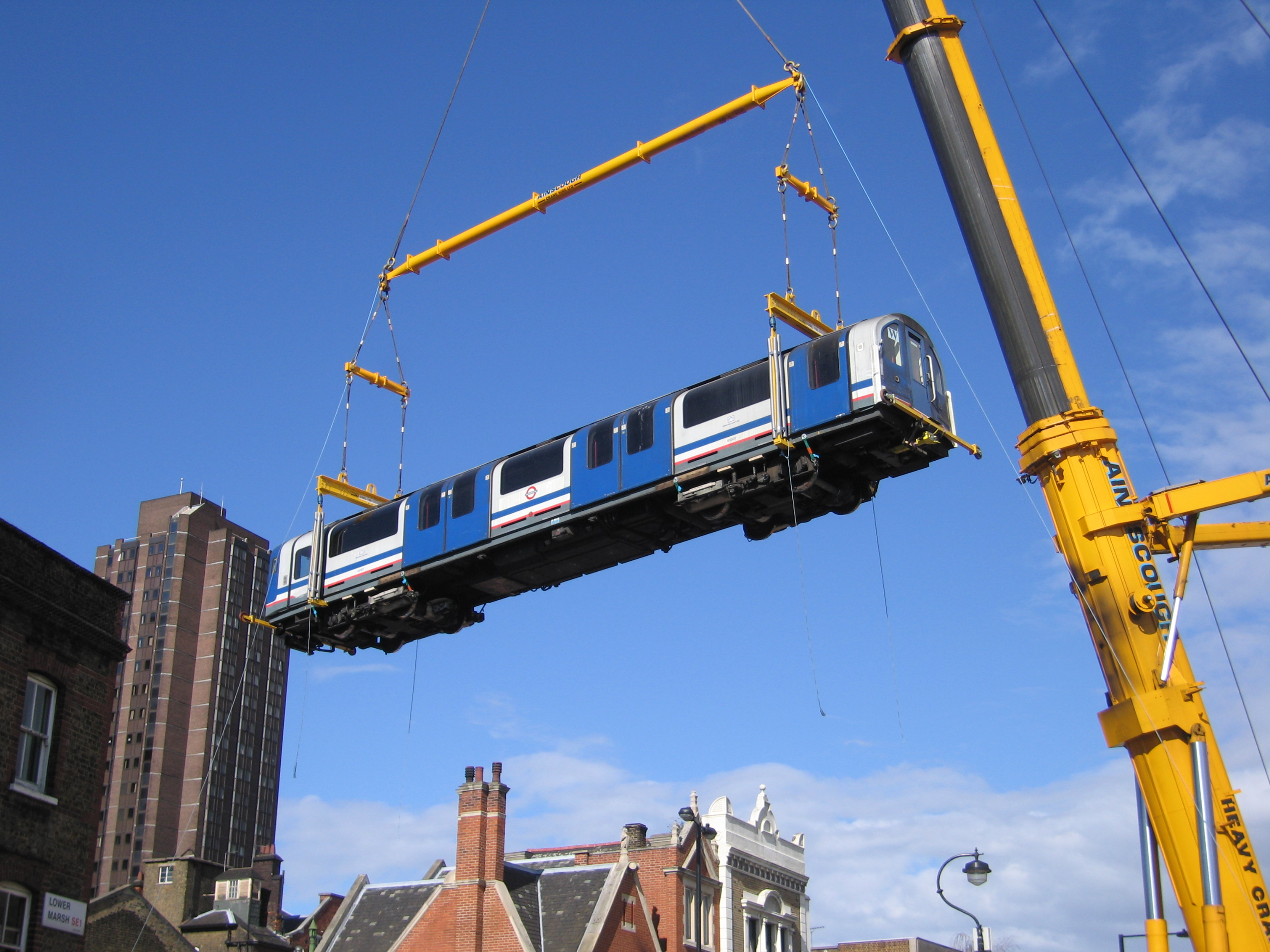
A carriage being lifted out of Waterloo depot

In the mid 1980s, British Rail was split into business sectors, with the line falling under the purview of Network SouthEast (NSE). The line was branded as Waterloo and City, and the elderly Class 487 trains were repainted in the red, blue and white NSE livery. In September 1989, a total route modernisation project was agreed at a cost of £19 million. Both stations would be refurbished in the NSE style, track and signals would be replaced and new rolling stock was ordered.

At the same time as the upgrade project, the Eurostar terminal at Waterloo International was being built over a large area on the north side of Waterloo station. This removed access to the Armstrong Lift that allowed rolling stock and other machinery to access the line, and therefore a replacement shaft near Spur Road was constructed to allow access to Waterloo Depot.

The modernisation project was completed by July 1993, following the delivery of five four-car Class 482 trains. These were built to a modified design from an order for 1992 Stock trains by London Underground for the Central line.

=== London Underground ===
As part of the privatisation of British Rail, on 1 April 1994 the line was transferred to London Underground Ltd for the sum of £1. At the time, staff were given the option of transferring with the line or remaining in British Rail employment, and all except one chose the latter. The drivers are currently based at Leytonstone. The turquoise line colour was chosen by a lawyer working on the legal transfer of the line to London Underground. From 15 April 1996, the line began working to a new timetable, with three trains departing in each ten minutes during the morning peak.

In January 2003, the Waterloo & City was closed for over three weeks for safety checks after a major derailment on the Central line, which required all 1992 tube stock trains to be modified. That same year, responsibility for the line's maintenance was given to the Metronet consortium under the terms of a public–private partnership arrangement.

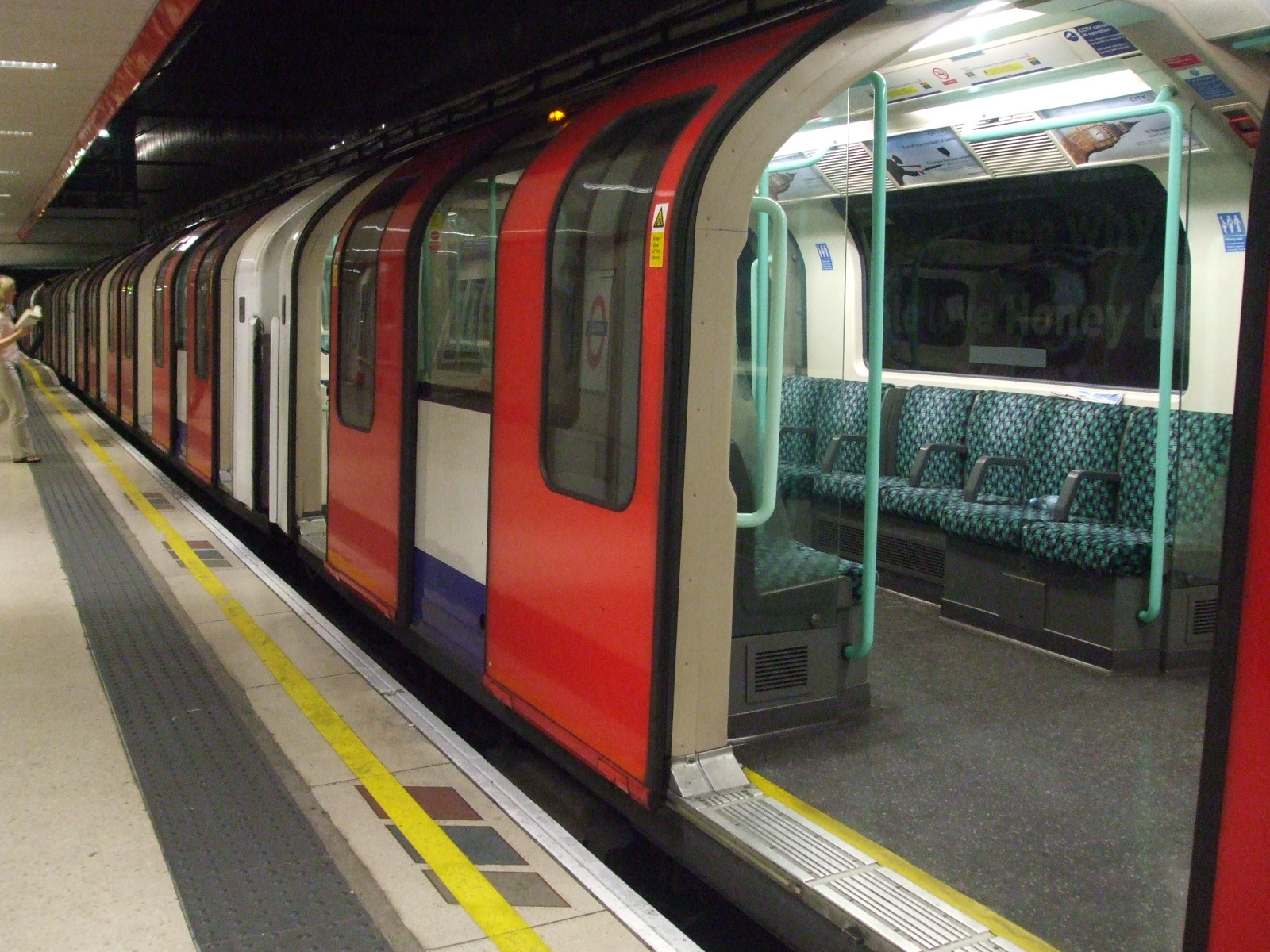
Refurbished 1992 stock train at Waterloo station

==== 2006 refurbishment ====
Between April and September 2006, the line was closed for five months for a £40 million upgrade by Metronet. The work included refurbishment of the tunnels, platforms and depot, full replacement of the track and signalling, and repainting and refurbishment of the trains. Four new 75 hp (56 kW) battery-powered locomotives, named Walter, Lou, Anne and Kitty, were built by Clayton Equipment in Derby to haul materials and plant along the line during the closure. These works were expected to boost rush-hour capacity by 25% and line capability by 12%. It was also claimed that the average journey would be up to 40 seconds shorter.

During the 2012 Summer Olympics and 2012 Summer Paralympics between late July and early September 2012, trains ran on Sundays to cope with the demand for travel in the City.

In the late 2010s, a new entrance at Bank station was constructed at Bloomberg's new London headquarters, providing direct access to the line via four new escalators and two lifts, and step-free access to the Waterloo and City line platforms. However, although step-free access is available at Bank, lift access is only available from the alighting platform at Waterloo, while the boarding platform is only accessible via steep ramps that do not meet accessibility standards. As a result, although the line can be accessed without steps in both directions, the line is only officially considered as having step-free access when travelling from Bank to Waterloo.

==== Closure during the COVID-19 pandemic ====
In March 2020, following the UK government's implementation of lockdown restricting all non-essential travel due to the COVID-19 pandemic, the Waterloo & City line was suspended. The service remained suspended for 15 months, due to the low level of travel demand on the line, and TfL prioritising the use of train operators on the busier Central line.

TfL stated that they did not expect to reopen the line until demand increased, despite calls from business groups in August 2020 to reopen the line to serve returning office workers. By March 2021, TfL stated that they expected the line to return to operation in May or June 2021, observing that services could be restarted at short notice if required. In May 2021, it was announced that the line would reopen from 21 June 2021. The line reopened ahead of schedule on 4 June 2021, initially operating a peak hour only service on weekday mornings and evenings, before expanding to a full timetable on weekdays in November 2021. It was noted that Saturday services will not be reintroduced for the "foreseeable future", with TfL stating that ridership on a Saturday pre pandemic was around one-sixth of an average weekday. The line remains closed on Sundays, as previously. In 2026, the City of London Corporation lobbied TfL to restore Saturday services, as part of efforts to encourage visitors to the City at weekends.

== Rolling stock ==
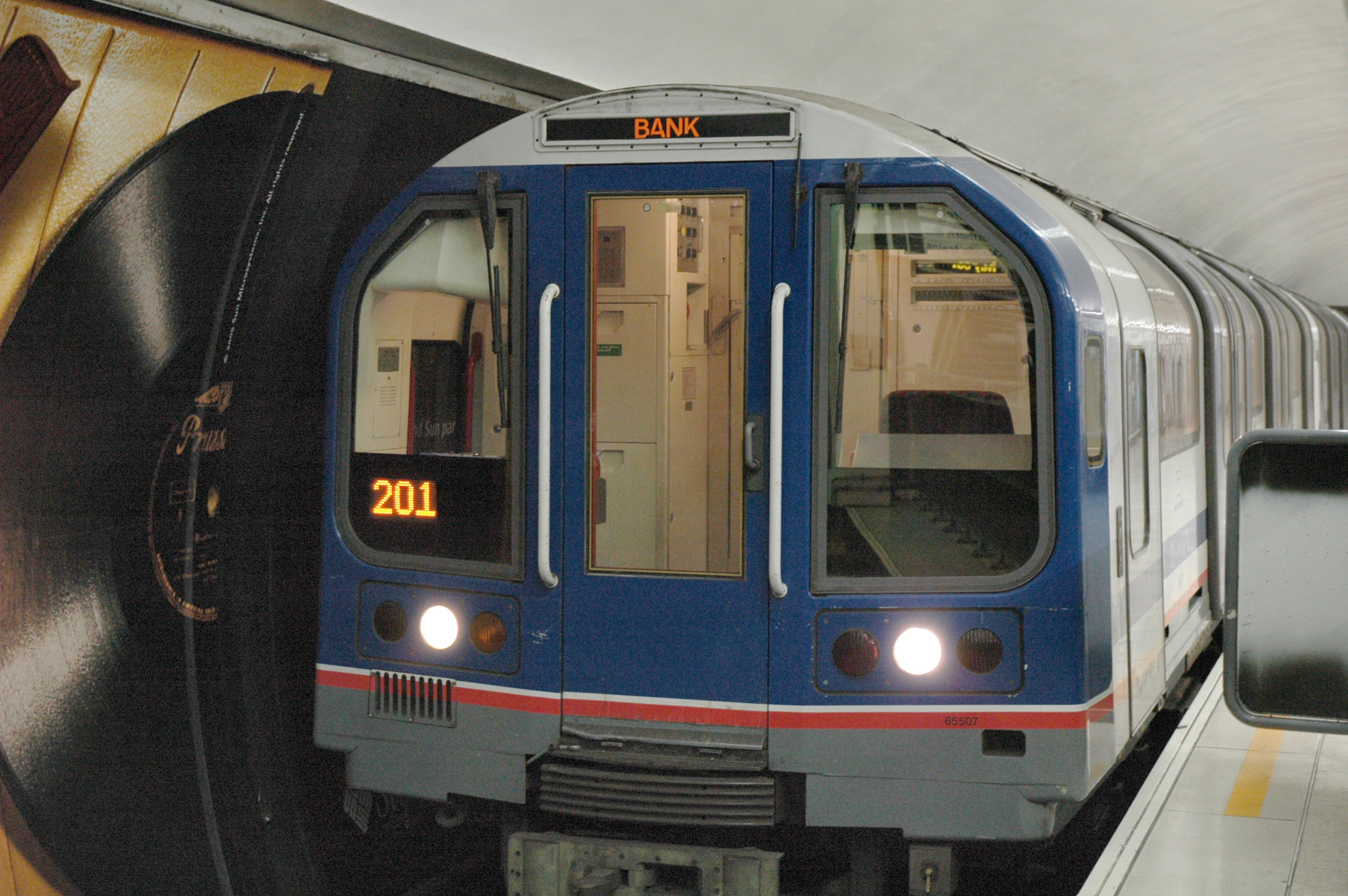
A train of 1992 stock in its original Network SouthEast livery stands at Bank on the Waterloo & City line.

Toward the end of the 1980s, the Class 487 rolling stock fleet built in the 1940s was increasingly unreliable. As part of the total route modernisation project by Network SouthEast (NSE), the decision was taken to purchase new vehicles as an addition to an order for new 1992 Stock trains by London Underground for the Central line. Five 4-car trains were ordered, albeit in Network SouthEast livery and no provision for automatic train operation.

The trains were constructed in 1992–93 and were initially tested and commissioned on the Central line, before being delivered by road to Waterloo depot. Unlike the Class 487 trains, the new trains required a fourth rail traction current system, with a central aluminium negative rail installed as part of the upgrade works to the line. On 28 May 1993, all of the old rolling stock was withdrawn, the train service being suspended temporarily. A temporary bus service was run while the old rolling stock was physically removed and the new rolling stock brought in. The line reopened on 19 July 1993, with a peak service frequency of 3 1/2 minutes. In April 1994, the trains transferred to London Underground following the privatisation of British Rail. Despite this, the trains kept their NSE livery.

In 2006, the 1992 stock trains were overhauled, refurbished and repainted as part of the line upgrade by Metronet. As part of the work, seats were replaced, CCTV was installed, and the original Network SouthEast livery was replaced by the London Underground corporate livery. A 500 tonne crane was required to lift the trains in and out of Waterloo depot, to allow the trains to be transported to Wabtec in Doncaster for the refurbishment work.

=== Future rolling stock ===
In the mid 2010s, TfL began a process of ordering new rolling stock to replace trains on the Piccadilly, Central, Bakerloo and Waterloo & City lines. A feasibility study into the new trains showed that new generation trains and track remodelling at Waterloo could increase capacity on the line by 50%, with 30 trains per hour.

In June 2018, the Siemens Mobility Inspiro design was selected. These trains would have an open gangway design, wider doorways, air conditioning and the ability to run automatically with a new signalling system. TfL could only afford to order Piccadilly line trains at a cost of £1.5bn. However, the contract with Siemens includes an option for 10 trains for the Waterloo & City line in the future. This would take place after the delivery of the Piccadilly line trains in the 2030s.

As part of the financial bailout of TfL in the aftermath of the COVID-19 pandemic, the Department for Transport is working with TfL to create a business case for making the line driverless.

=== Historic rolling stock ===
After tendering, a contract for supply of the passenger vehicles was let to the Jackson and Sharp Company of Wilmington, Delaware in the sum of £21,675. The vehicles were to be shipped to Southampton in knock-down kit form, to be assembled at Eastleigh Works by the LSWR.

By 6 January 1898, a skeleton carriage could be run through the tunnels to verify clearances and the first fully assembled train of four carriages was run from Eastleigh to Waterloo on 4 March 1898. The lift for lowering rolling stock to the tunnel level, and some electrical work, were not ready, but on 4 June 1898 a successful trial run was made.

The motor coaches were 47 feet 1 inch (14.35 m) overall length, and the trailers were 46 feet 3 1/2 inches (14.110 m), both being 8 feet 6 inches (2.59 m) wide at floor level and 9 feet 8 inches (2.95 m) high from rail level. There were 11 of each type, to run in four four-car formations with spares.

The accommodation was of the open saloon type, then a novelty in Britain; there were gate entrances at the end of the vehicles. The trailers seated 56 persons, and the motor coaches seated 46, with a raised section over the motor bogie.

The traction motors by Siemens were series-wound 60 hp (45 kW) gearless motors on the axles. The trains ran in a formation of four cars, the two outer vehicles being motor coaches. The motor cars were constructed to allow an early form of multiple unit operation and the front car's controller was additionally able to control the rear car's motors. The two motors at each end were connected in series at starting, then reconnected in parallel (using open circuit transition) as the train accelerated in the well established (at that time) method. This required eight cables to be run the length of the train at roof level. A further cable making nine in all linked the collector shoes at opposite ends of the four-car set to avoid problems with the large gaps in the centrally mounted conductor rail.

There was a crew of six at first: driver, driver's assistant, guard and three gatemen; the driver's assistant was subsequently no longer required. The trains used Westinghouse brakes, and the air reservoirs were charged from static compressors at Waterloo. They were charged to 100 psi (690 kPa), running down to 70 psi (480 kPa) before needing to be recharged. Lighting was run from the power circuit, with four lamps in series from the 500 V nominal.

==== New trains ordered by the Southern Railway ====
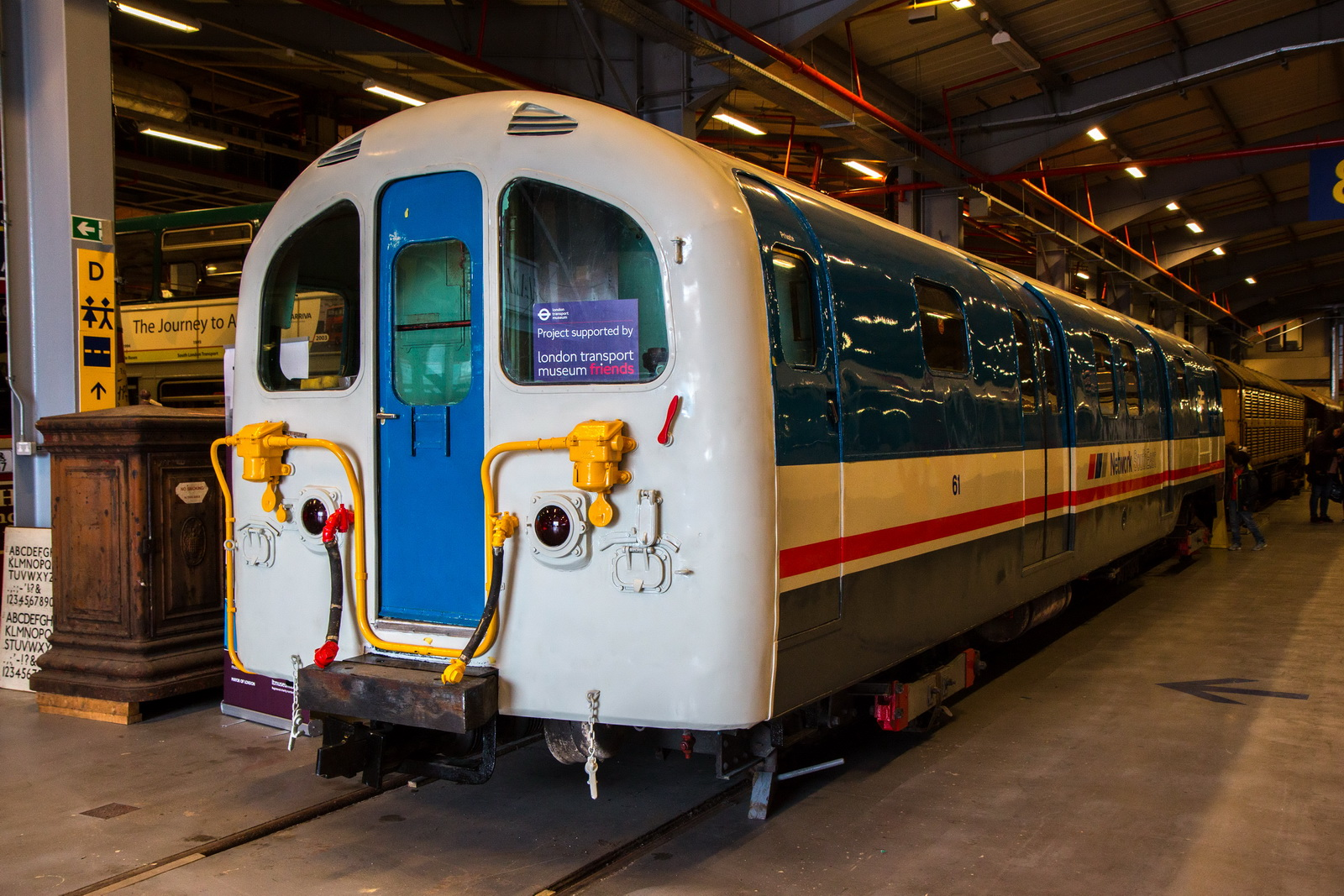
Preserved 1940 stock at the London Transport Museum Depot

In the late 1930s, new rolling stock was ordered by the Southern Railway. Despite the declaration of war in September 1939, the work was considered well advanced, and 12 motor coaches and 16 trailers were ordered from English Electric, and built at the Dick, Kerr & Co. works at Preston. The Art Deco style trains were delivered through 1940, and the old cars were removed from the line on 25 October 1940, the new cars starting work on 28 October, with the line closed over the intervening weekend.

Constructed of welded steel, trains were run in five-car formations, Motor coach + trailer + trailer + trailer + motor coach, with spares for overhaul. The motor coaches had cabs at each end, enabling single-car operation by them; they had two axle-hung traction motors rated at 190 hp (140 kW) for one hour. The new trains had on-board compressors for the air brakes, and interior lights were in two circuits, one fed from the motor car at one end of the unit, and one from the other, avoiding total lighting loss in passing conductor rail gaps. The conductor rail was altered to the outside position normal for the third-rail system. There was no train power line, and each motor coach collected its own electric supply.

== Extension proposals ==
There have been proposals to extend the Waterloo & City line for over a century. After acquiring the Great Northern & City Railway (GN&C) in 1913 (the current Northern City Line), the Metropolitan Railway considered proposals to join the GN&C to the Waterloo & City or to the Circle line, but these never came to fruition. Any extension of the line north would be difficult because of the complex web of tube lines around Bank, and an extension south would be unlikely to provide demand that matched the cost. The narrow tunnels and short train lengths of the current route make any extension less cost-effective than larger projects such as Crossrail 2, which cost more but start with modern tunnels and promise far greater benefits.

The London Plan Working Party Report of 1949 envisaged as its Route G the electrification of the London, Tilbury & Southend Railway (LTS), and its diversion away from Fenchurch Street to Bank and on through the Waterloo & City tunnels to Waterloo and its suburban lines. The Waterloo & City tunnels would have had to be bored out to main line size to enable this, at prohibitive cost. In the event, only the electrification of the LTS took place, though the Docklands Light Railway tunnel from Minories to the Bank follows part of the envisaged route.

The revised Working Party Report of 1965 did not mention the Route G proposal, though it does conclude that "[t]he possibility of extending the Waterloo & City line northwards to Liverpool Street has been examined, but found to be physically impracticable."

Around 2009, the Green Party revived the Metropolitan's plan of connecting the Northern City and Waterloo & City lines as a Crossrail route.

== Service ==
Trains on the Waterloo & City line run every five minutes on the weekday off-peak, providing a service of 12 trains per hour each direction.

== Map and stations ==
The route of the Waterloo & City line

Station	Image	Opened	Additional information
Bank		8 August 1898	Opened as City, renamed 28 October 1940.^{map 1} Connects with Central, Circle, District and Northern lines and Docklands Light Railway.
Waterloo		8 August 1898	Connects with Bakerloo, Jubilee and Northern lines and National Rail services. The platforms at Waterloo^{map 2} are numbered 25 and 26 to be consistent with the mainline station platform numbering, a remnant of BR days.

== In popular culture ==
The Waterloo and City line is closed on Sundays; as a result, it has become a well-established and convenient location for film companies. When it was owned by British Rail and its predecessors, it could be used when London Transport were unable or unwilling to allow access to their own stations or lines.

- The film The Long Memory (1953) contains a suicide attempt on the railway.
- It can be also seen in the Norman Wisdom film On the Beat (1962), where filming took place on 12 August 1961.
- Scenes for a murder in the film The Liquidator (1965) were recorded at Bank station.
- The second series of the BBC's Survivors was filmed on the line, representing various parts of the Central and Northern lines.
- In the television adaptation of The Tripods (1984), Waterloo masquerades as Porte de la Chapelle station on the Paris Métro.
- Waterloo was also used in the Peter Howitt film Sliding Doors (1998), portraying Embankment and one other unknown District line station.

== Other details ==
The remnants of one of the Greathead tunnelling shields used in the construction of the line can be seen in the interchange tunnel at Bank connecting the Waterloo and City line platforms with those of the Northern line and the Docklands Light Railway. It is painted red.

The Waterloo & City line is colloquially known as The Drain, and it was given the Engineer's Line Reference code 'DRN' by British Rail. The origins of this nickname seem to be uncertain; it may be due to the tunnels beneath the Thames continually leaking and the resulting water needing to be pumped out, or perhaps because passenger access to the platforms at Bank was by a lengthy sloping subway resembling a drain.

Uniquely among London's Underground lines, virtually all infrastructure on the Waterloo & City line is completely underground, including all track, both stations, and the maintenance depot at Waterloo. (The Victoria line is also underground for the entire passenger route and all stations, but has a surface level, open-air depot for maintenance.) There are no track connections with any other railway line; all equipment transfers to and from the line are accomplished from the shaft and road crane at the Waterloo depot.

== Similar services ==
- The 42nd Street Shuttle on the New York City Subway runs between Times Square and Grand Central.
- The Ramal on the Madrid Metro, linking Ópera and Príncipe Pío stations.
- Línia 12 of the Barcelona Metro (managed by Ferrocarrils de la Generalitat de Catalunya: FGC) links only two nearby stations: Sarrià (connecting to L6) and Reina Elisenda.
- The T7 Olympic Park Line on the Sydney Trains Network connecting Olympic Park and Lidcombe.

== Maps ==
- ^map 1Bank – 51°30′47″N 000°05′17″W
- ^map 2Waterloo – 51°30′09″N 000°06′47″W
- ^map 3Waterloo Depot – 51°30′07″N 000°06′42″W
- ^map 4Waterloo Lift Siding – 51°30′07″N 000°06′39″W

== See also ==
- List of crossings of the River Thames
- Tunnels underneath the River Thames
