= British Rail Class 482 =

British electric multiple unit train type

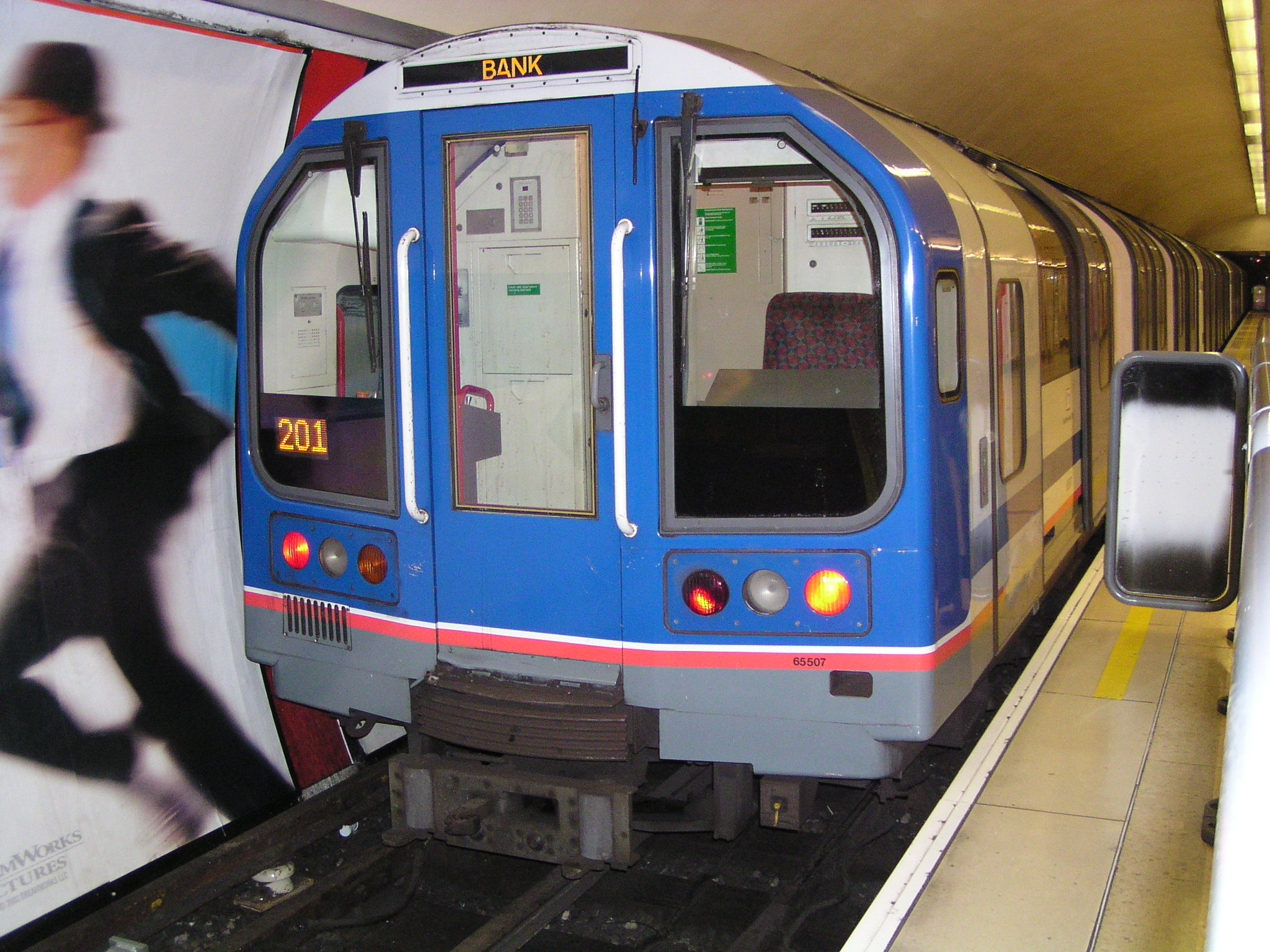
- Network SouthEast liveried Class 482 at Bank in 2003

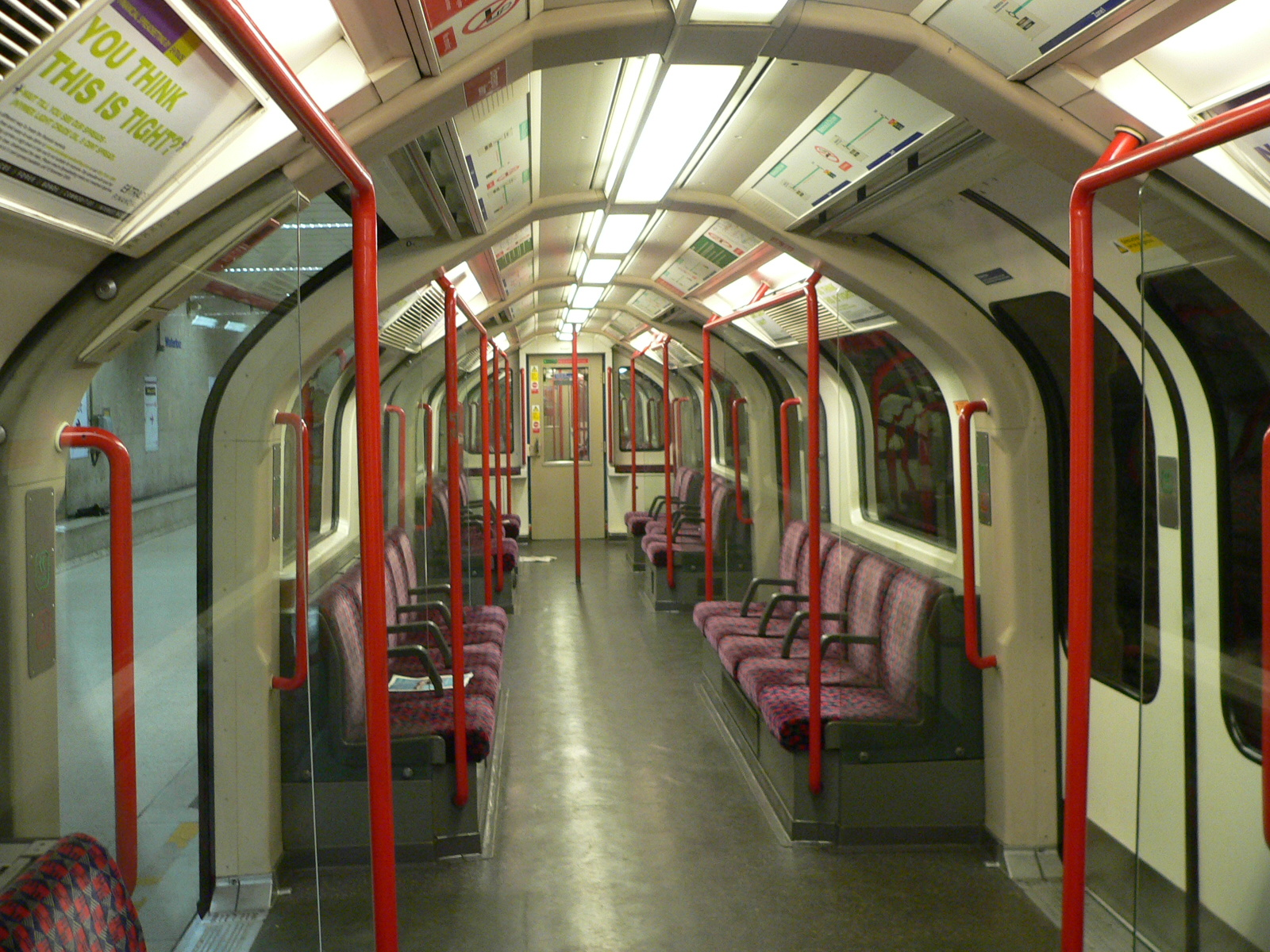
- Interior of a Class 482
- In service: 1993 – 1994 (British Rail); 1994 – present (London Underground)
- Manufacturer: ABB
- Built at: Derby Litchurch Lane Works
- Family name: Tube
- Replaced: Class 487
- Constructed: 1992–1993
- Number built: 10 units
- Formation: 2 cars per unit, 2 units per train
- Capacity: 72 seats
- Operator: British Rail
- Depot: Waterloo (Waterloo & City line)
- Line served: Waterloo & City line

Specifications
- Maximum speed: 60 mph (97 km/h)
- Traction system: ABB GTO chopper
- Traction motors: Brush LT130 DC motor
- Electric system: 750 V DC fourth rail
- Track gauge: 1,435 mm (4 ft 8 1/2 in) standard gauge

The British Rail Class 482 electric multiple units were built by ABB in 1992, for use on the Waterloo & City line. The units are almost identical to the 1992 tube stock built for the Central line.

Ten 2-car units were built, numbered 482501–510. Each unit consisted of a type "E" driving motor, numbered 65501–510, and a type "F" non-driving motor, numbered 67501–510. Trains were operated using two units semi-permanently coupled, with the driving motors outermost.

The units were built as direct replacements for the elderly Class 487 units, dating from 1940. They were delivered to Ruislip depot during March 1993, and were painted in Network SouthEast livery; however, as the Waterloo & City line was completely separate from the rest of the National Rail network, and was entirely underground, they did not receive yellow front ends. Following commissioning (which included test runs as 8-car trains over most of the Central line), they were delivered by road to the Waterloo & City line during May and June 1993, and following further test runs, entered service on 19 July 1993.

On 1 April 1994, operational control of the Waterloo & City line transferred to London Underground. Shortly after the transfer of the line, unit numbers and NSE logos were removed, and LU roundels added together with Central line diagrams. The BR car numbers were retained, not having previously been used by London Underground; and some of the other BR markings were also retained on the inner ends of the "F" cars, but otherwise the trains remained in as-built condition until refurbishment in 2006.

== Fleet details ==
| Class | Operator | No. Built | Year built | Cars per Set | Unit nos. | Notes |
|---|---|---|---|---|---|---|
| Class 482 | Network SouthEast | 10 | 1992–93 | 2 | 482501-482510 | Transferred to London Underground 1994, now in service as London Underground 1992 Stock |

== Gallery ==
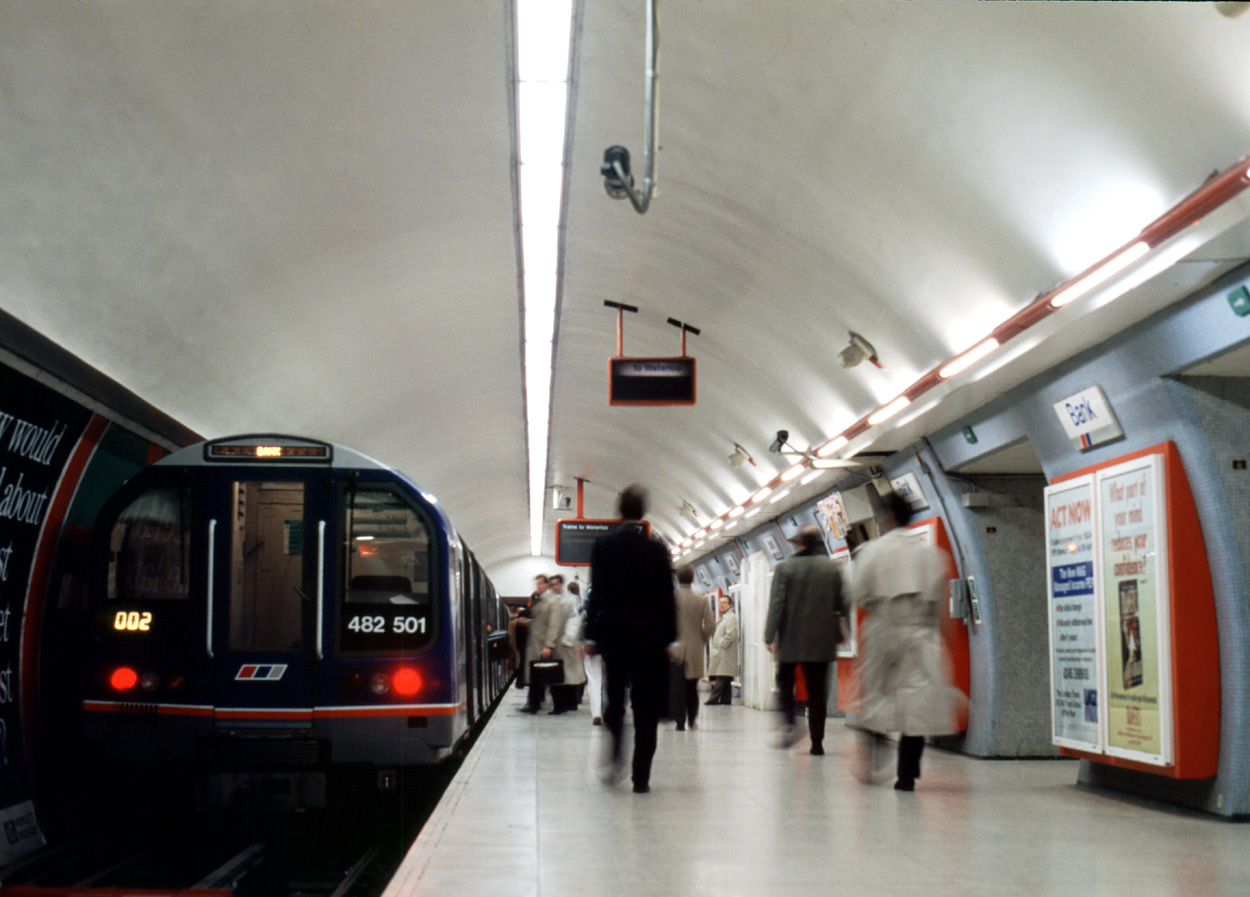
Class 482 in Network SouthEast livery at Bank station

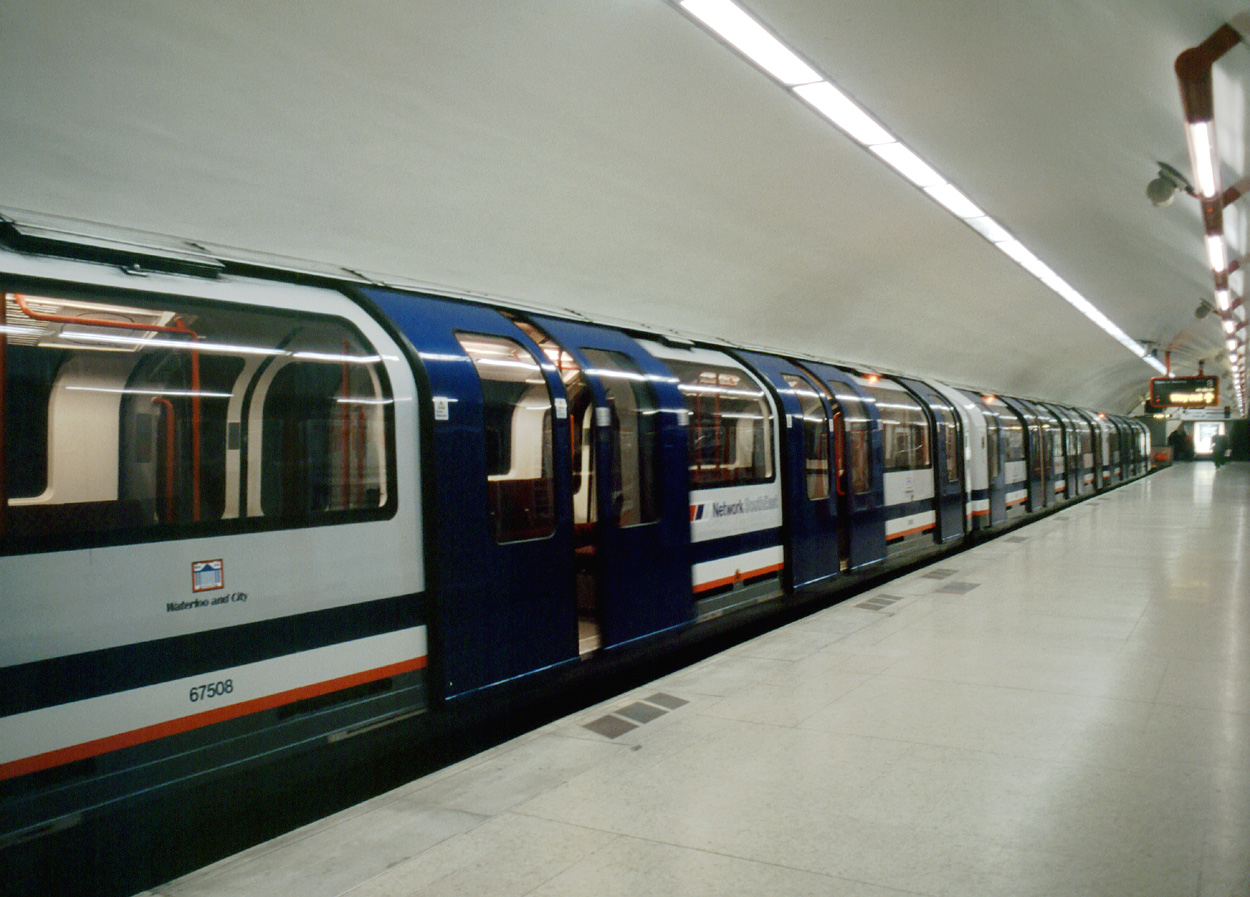
Class 482 in Network SouthEast livery at Bank station

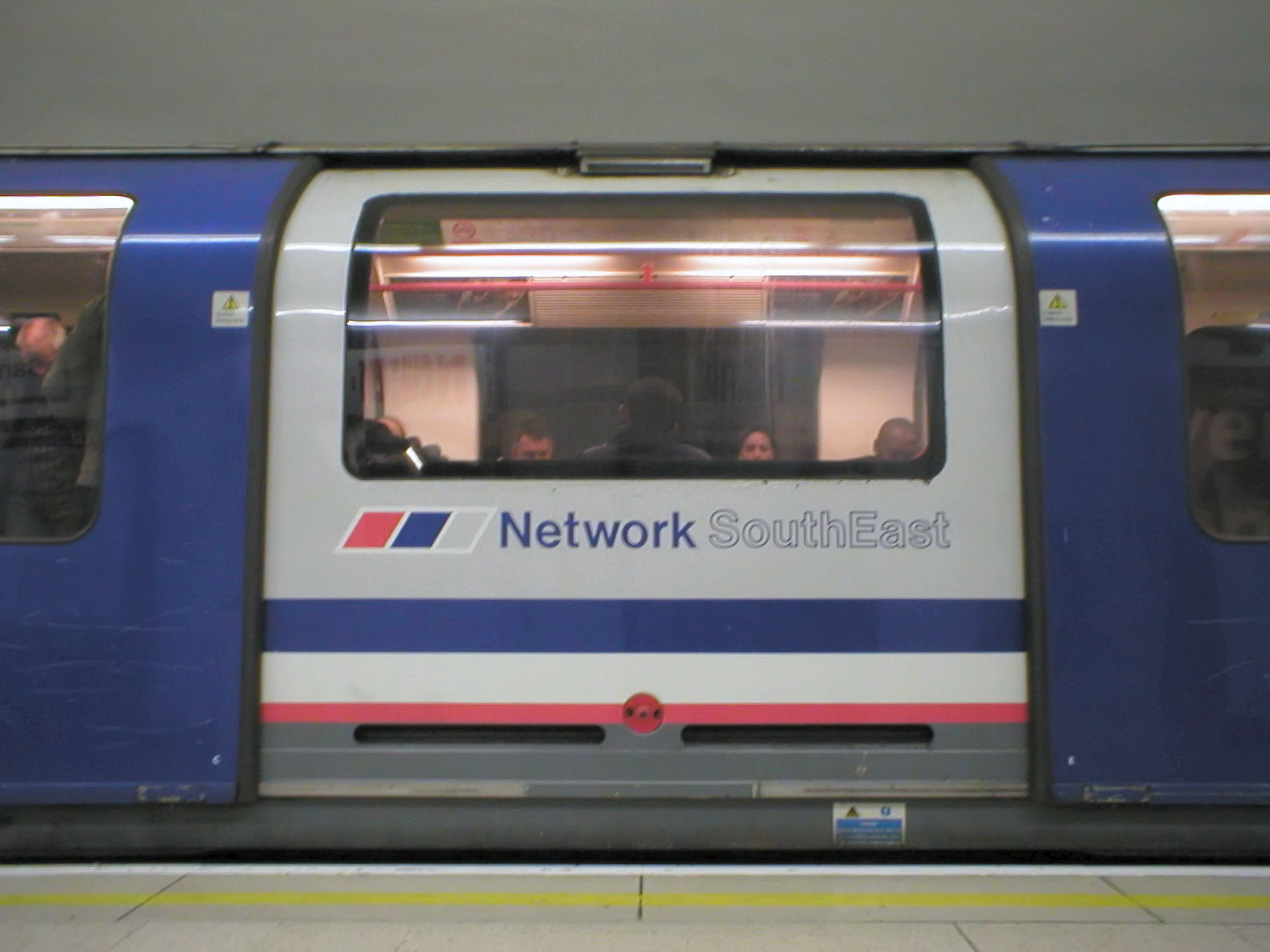
