= Waterloo Underground Depot =

London Underground maintenance depot located in Waterloo, London

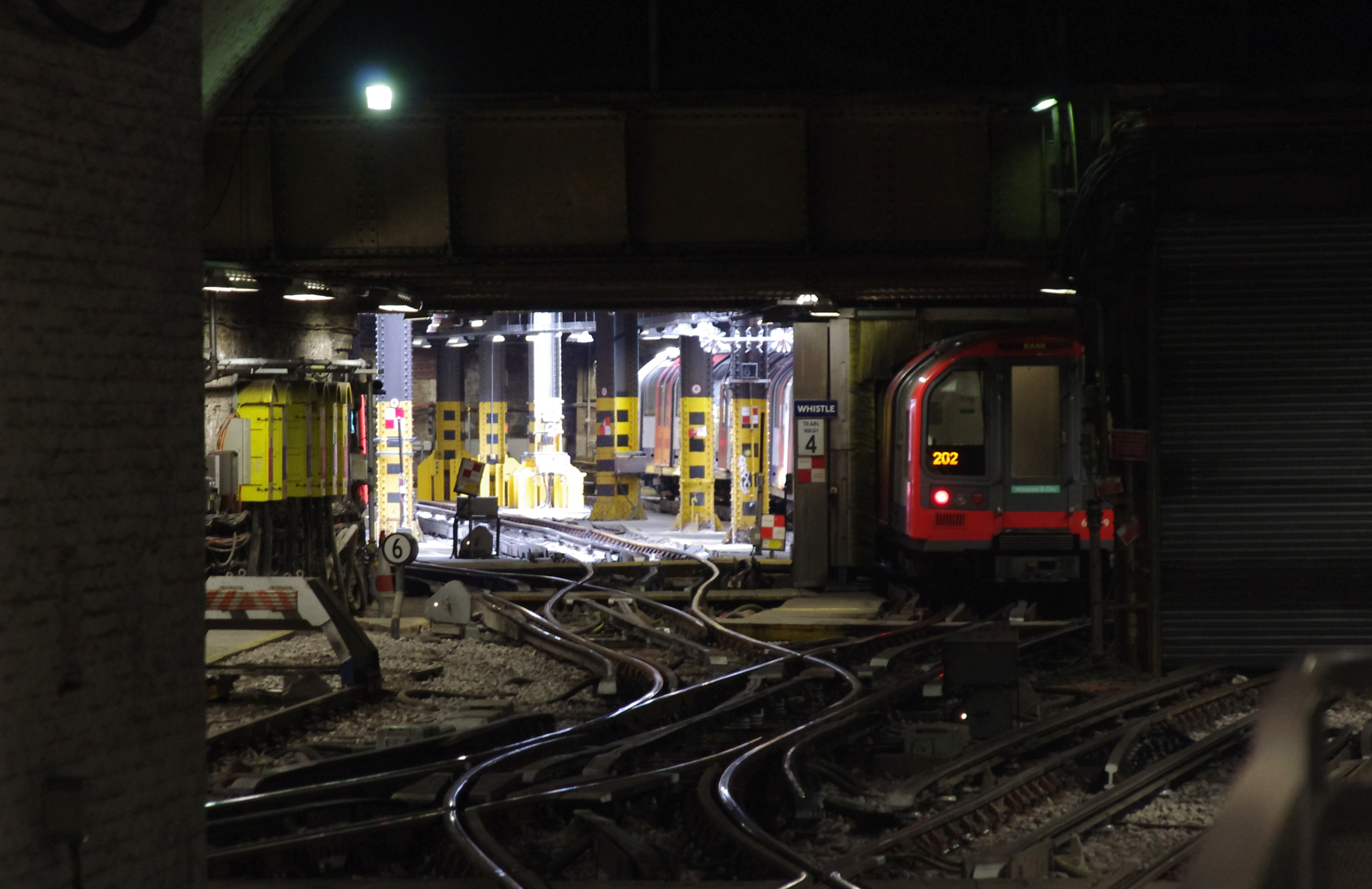
- Waterloo Underground Depot seen from Waterloo Underground Station
- Interactive map of Waterloo Underground Depot

Location
- Location: Waterloo, London
- Coordinates: 51.5017°N 0.1113°W
- OS grid: TQ311798

Characteristics
- Depot code: WC (1973 -)
- Type: EMU

Waterloo Underground Depot is a London Underground maintenance depot which stables the Waterloo & City line's fleet of 1992 Stock trains. The depot is entirely below ground and is situated beyond the Waterloo & City line platform end at Waterloo Underground station. Trains from Bank reverse at the depot before returning. It is one of the smallest depots on the Underground network, and one of the only two depots to be completely underground, the other being White City Depot on the Central line. For larger items like rolling stock, lengths of rail and other heavy machinery, access to the depot can only be achieved via a shaft on Spur Road, requiring a large crane to do so.

== History ==
The depot opened in 1898 when the Waterloo and City line began operation. Until the early 1990s, Class 487 EMUs were allocated to the depot. Since 1993, Class 482 (now 1992 Stock) trains are stabled at the depot.
