= List of British Rail electric multiple unit classes =

British EMU classification system

This article lists every electric-powered multiple unit allocated a TOPS classification or used on the mainline network since 1948, i.e. British Railways and post-privatisation. For a historical overview of electric multiple unit development in Great Britain, see British electric multiple units.

British Rail operated a wide variety of electric multiple units for use on electrified lines:

- AC units operate off 25 kV alternating current (AC) from overhead wires. Where clearances for the overhead wires on the Great Eastern Main Line, North Clyde Line and London, Tilbury and Southend railway routes were below standard, a reduced voltage of 6.25 kV AC was used. The Midland Railway units used 6.6 kV AC. Under the computer numbering, AC units (including mixed-voltage units that can also work off a DC supply) were given a class in the range 300–399.
- DC units operate off 650–850 V direct current (DC) from a third rail on the Southern Region and North London, Merseyside and Tyneside networks. The Manchester-Bury Railway line used 1,200 V DC from a side-contact third rail. The Manchester South Junction & Altrincham and "Woodhead" and initially the Great Eastern Railway routes used 1,500 V DC from overhead wires. Under the computer numbering, DC units were given a class in the range 400–599.

== AC EMUs and dual-voltage EMUs ==
=== First generation ===
| TOPS class | Pre-TOPS class | Name or Information | Built | Quantity (sets) | Notes | Image | Withdrawn | Scrapped |
|---|---|---|---|---|---|---|---|---|
| | ex-Ex-MR units | Lancaster-Morecambe-Heysham | 1908 | 3 (4-car) | | | 1953 | All |
| Class 300 | | Proposed parcels units | | | Planned parcels conversation from Class 307 | | Never built | Never built |
| | AM1 | 25 kV AC prototype units | 1952 | 4 | | | 1966 | All |
| Class 302 | AM2 | London-Tilbury-Southend | 1958–1960 | 112 | | | 1999 | About 110 |
| Class 303 | AM3 | Strathclyde. Also on Greater Manchester area services during 1980s/early 1990s. | 1959–1961 | 91 | 75613 from unit 303013 is still in use with the British Transport Police. | | 1974–2002 | 90 |
| Class 304 | AM4 | Greater Manchester, Liverpool, Birmingham; 1959 EMU | 1960 | 45 | | | 1992–1996 | All |
| Class 305 | AM5 | Chingford, Enfield; 1959 EMU | 1959 | 71 | | | 1992–2002 | All |
| Class 306 | AM6 | Shenfield (inner-suburban) | 1949 | 92 | Ordered by LNER in 1938, but construction was delayed due to World War II. | | 1981 | 91 |
| Class 307 | AM7 | Southend (outer-suburban) | 1954–1956 | 32 | | | 1990–1993; 2000 (parcel units) | 31 |
| Class 308 | AM8 | Eastern Region lines 1959 EMU | 1959 | 45 | | | 1983; 1992; 2001 | All |
| Class 309 | AM9 | Clacton Express. | 1962–1963 | 76 | | | 1994–2000; 2004 (departmental use) | About 74 |
| Class 310 | AM10 | Euston outer-suburban. Also West Midlands | 1965–1967 | 50 | | | 1967 (1); 1989 (1); 2001–2002; 2005 (departmental use) | All |
| Class 311 | AM11 | Strathclyde | 1966–1967 | 19 | | | 1990; 1999 (departmental use) | 18 |
| Class 312 | | Great Eastern suburban Great Northern suburban West Midlands (four units) | 1975–1978 | 49 | | | 2003–2004 | 49 |

=== Second generation ===
| TOPS class | Built for | Current Operator(s) | Builder | Number built | Image | Withdrawn | Scrapped |
|---|---|---|---|---|---|---|---|
| Class 313 (Note: DC 600–750 V 3rd rail support.) | BR Eastern Region (Great Northern suburban) | | BREL York 1976–1977 | 64 × 3-car sets | | 2019 (GN); 2023 (Southern) | 62 |
| Class 314 | BR Scottish Region (Argyle Line) | | BREL York 1979 | 16 × 3-car sets | | 2018–2019 | 15 |
| Class 315 | BR Eastern Region (Great Eastern suburban) | | BREL York 1980–1981 | 61 × 4-car sets | | 2018–2022 | 60 |
| Class 316 (I) | proposed units for Picc-Vic services | – | (never built) | – | | Never built | Never built |
| Class 316 (II) | (AC Networker prototype) | (never used in passenger service, now out of service) | converted from class 210 and 313 cars | 1 × 4-car set | | Out of service | 1 |
| Class 316 (III) | (test unit) | (never used in passenger service, scrapped 2006) | converted from class 307 | 1 × 3-car set | | 2006 | 1 |
| Class 317 | Class 317/1 London Midland Region; Class 317/2 Network SouthEast (Bedpan and Great Northern lines) | | BREL York 1981–1982 (317/1); 1985–1987 (317/2) | 72 × 4-car sets | | 2020–2022 | 286 cars |
| Class 318 | Provincial ScotRail (for Strathclyde PTE) | ScotRail | BREL York 1985–1986 | 21 × 3-car sets | | still in use | None |
| Class 319 | Network SouthEast (Thameslink services) | Rail Operations Group | BREL York 1987–1988 (319/0); 1990 (319/1) | 86 × 4-car sets | | still in use | 41 |
| Class 320 | Provincial ScotRail (for Strathclyde PTE) | ScotRail | BREL York 1990 | 22 × 3-car sets | | still in use | None |
| Class 321 | Network SouthEast (Great Eastern and Euston services); Regional Railways (for West Yorkshire PTE) | Varamis Rail | BREL York 1988–1991 | 117 × 4-car sets | | 2021–2023 | 12 TSOs; 96 units |
| Class 322 | Network SouthEast (Stansted Express service) | | BREL York 1990 | 5 × 4-car sets | | 2022 | All |
| Class 325 | Rail Express Systems (for Royal Mail) | | ABB Derby 1995–1996 | 16 × 4-car units | | 1995–2024 | 10 |

=== Modern/Third generation ===
These use solid state switching devices (thyristors and transistors) and have electronic power control.

| TOPS class | Built for | Current Operator(s) | Builder | Number Built | Image | Withdrawn | Scrapped |
|---|---|---|---|---|---|---|---|
| Class 323 | Regional Railways (for West Midlands PTE and Greater Manchester PTE) | Northern Trains | Hunslet Transportation Projects/Holec 1992–1995 | 43 x 3-car sets | | still in use | None |
| Class 331 (I) | proposed units for London, Tilbury and Southend; Original classification of Class 332 | | (never built) | | | Never built | Never built |
| Class 331 (II); Civity | Arriva Rail North | Northern Trains | CAF 2017–2020 | 31 x 3-car units 12 x 4-car units | | still in use | None |
| Class 332 | Heathrow Express | | Siemens Transportation Systems/CAF 1997–1998, 2002 | 9 x 4-car sets 5 x 5-car sets | | 2020 | 58 cars |
| Class 333 | Arriva Trains Northern (for West Yorkshire PTE) | Northern Trains | Siemens Transportation Systems/CAF 2000–2003 | 16 x 4-car sets | | still in use | None |
| Class 334; Juniper | ScotRail (for Strathclyde PTE) | ScotRail | Alstom Birmingham 1999–2002 | 40 x 3-car sets | | still in use | None |
| Class 341; Networker | proposed units for Crossrail | | (never built) | | | Never built | Never built |
| Class 342; Networker | proposed units for Channel Tunnel Rail Link Domestic Services | | (never built) | | | Never built | Never built |
| Class 345; Aventra | Elizabeth line | Elizabeth line | Bombardier Derby 2015–2019 | 70 x 9-car sets | | still in use | None |
| Class 350 (I) | Original classification of Class 325 | | | | | | |
| Class 350 (II); Desiro | Silverlink; Central Trains | West Midlands Trains | Siemens Transportation Systems 2004–2005; 2008–2009; 2013–2014 | 87 x 4-car sets | | still in use | None |
| Class 357; Electrostar | LTS Rail | c2c | Adtranz/Bombardier Derby 1999–2002 | 74 x 4-car sets | | still in use | None |
| Class 360; Desiro | First Great Eastern; Heathrow Connect | East Midlands Railway | Siemens Transportation Systems 2002–2003; 2004–2005 | 21 x 4-car sets 5 x 5-car sets | | still in use | 2 |
| Class 365; Networker | Network SouthEast (Great Northern and South Eastern services) | | ABB York 1994–1995 | 41 x 4-car sets | | 2021 | 161 cars |
| Class 371; Networker | proposed units for Thameslink 2000 | – | (never built) | – | | Never built | Never built |
| Class 375; Electrostar | Connex South Eastern; South Eastern Trains | Southeastern | Adtranz/Bombardier Derby 1999–2005 | 10 x 3-car sets 102 x 4-car sets | | still in use | None |
| Class 376; Electrostar | South Eastern Trains | Southeastern | Bombardier Derby 2004–2005 | 36 x 5-car sets | | still in use | None |
| Class 377; Electrostar | Southern | Southeastern; Southern | Bombardier Derby 2001–2005; 2008–2009; 2013–2014 | 28 x 3-car sets 177 x 4-car sets 34 x 5-car sets | | still in use | None |
| Class 378; Capitalstar | London Overground | London Overground | Bombardier Derby 2008–2011 | 57 x 5-car sets | | still in use | None |
| Class 379; Electrostar | National Express East Anglia | Great Northern | Bombardier Derby 2010–2011 | 30 x 4-car sets | | still in use | None |
| Class 380; Desiro | First ScotRail | ScotRail | Siemens Mobility 2009–2011 | 22 x 3-car sets 16 x 4-car sets | | still in use | None |
| Class 381; Networker | proposed Network SouthEast express units | – | (never built) | – | | Never built | Never built |
| Class 382 | Northern Trains | | TBA | 46 x 3-car sets 16 x 4-car sets | | not yet in service | None |
| Class 385 AT200 | Abellio ScotRail | ScotRail | Hitachi Kudamatsu & Hitachi Newton Aycliffe 2015–2019 | 46 x 3-car sets 24 x 4-car sets | | still in use | None |
| Class 387; Electrostar | Thameslink; Great Western Railway c2c | Gatwick Express; Great Northern; Great Western Railway; Heathrow Express | Bombardier Derby 2014–2017 | 107 x 4-car sets | | still in use | None |
| Class 700; Desiro City | Thameslink | Thameslink; Great Northern | Siemens Mobility 2014–2018 | 60 x 8-car sets 55 x 12-car sets | | still in use | None |
| Class 701; Aventra | South Western Railway | South Western Railway | Bombardier/Alstom Derby 2019– | 30 x 5-car sets 60 x 10-car sets | | still in use | None |
| Class 705 | Original classification of Class 701 | | | | | | |
| Class 707; Desiro City | South West Trains | Southeastern | Siemens Mobility 2015–2018 | 30 x 5-car sets | | still in use | None |
| Class 710; Aventra | London Overground | London Overground | Bombardier Derby 2017–2020 | 48 x 4-car sets 6 x 5-car sets | | still in use | None |
| Class 711 | Original classification of Class 701 | | | | | | |
| Class 717; Desiro City | Great Northern | Great Northern | Siemens Mobility 2018–2019 | 25 x 6-car sets | | still in use | None |
| Class 720; Aventra | Greater Anglia c2c | Greater Anglia c2c | Bombardier/Alstom Derby 2018–2020 | 145 x 5-car sets | | still in use | None |
| Class 730; Aventra | West Midlands Trains | West Midlands Trains | Bombardier/Alstom Derby 2020–2021 | 36 x 3-car sets 45 x 5-car sets | | still in use | None |
| Class 745; FLIRT | Greater Anglia | Greater Anglia | Stadler Rail 2018–2020 | 20 x 12-car sets | | still in use | None |
| Class 755; FLIRT | Greater Anglia | Greater Anglia | Stadler Rail 2018–2020 | 14 x 3-car sets 24 x 4-car sets | | still in use | None |
| Class 756; FLIRT | Transport for Wales Rail | Transport for Wales Rail | Stadler Rail 2021–2023 | 7 × 3-car sets 17 × 4-car sets | | still in use | None |
| Class 768 | Rail Operations Group | Rail Operations Group | BREL York 1987–88; Brush Traction 2020– (conversion) | 10 x 4-car sets | | still in use | None |
| Class 769; Flex | Great Western Railway; Northern Trains; Rail Operations Group; Transport for Wales Rail | Northern Trains | BREL York 1987–88; Brush Traction 2017–2020 (conversion) | 35 x 4-car sets | | still in use | 1 car |
| Class 777; METRO | Merseyrail | Merseyrail | Stadler Rail 2018–2021 | 52 x 4-car sets | | still in use | None |
| Class 780 | Northern Trains | | TBA | 78 x 3-car sets 83 x 4-car sets | | not yet in service | None |
| Class 781 | Northern Trains | | TBA | 32 x 4-car sets | | not yet in service | None |
| Class 799; HydroFlex | Porterbrook | Porterbrook | BREL York, 1987; Quinton Rail Technology Centre 2019 (conversion) | 2 x 4-car sets | | still in use | 1 |

=== High speed trains ===
High speed multiple unit or fixed formation trainsets, capable of operating at speeds above 190 kilometres per hour (120 mph).

| TOPS class | Built for | Current Operator(s) | Builder | Number Built | Image | Withdrawn | Scrapped |
|---|---|---|---|---|---|---|---|
| Class 370; APT-P | prototype APT | | BREL Derby 1979 | 6 x 7-car half sets 2 spare cars | | 1985–1986 | 35 cars |
| Class 373; TGV | Eurostar | Eurostar | GEC Alsthom, La Brugeoise et Nivelles 1992–1996 | 14 x 8-car half sets 62 x 10-car half sets 1 spare car | | still in use | 17 |
| Class 374; Velaro UK | Eurostar | Eurostar | Siemens Mobility 2011–2018 | 34 x 8-car half sets | | still in use | None |
| Class 390; Pendolino | Virgin Trains | Avanti West Coast | Alstom Birmingham 2001–2004; Alstom Savigliano, Italy 2010–2012 | 22 x 9-car sets 35 x 11-car sets | | still in use | 1 |
| Class 395; Javelin | Southeastern | Southeastern | Hitachi, Japan 2007–2009 | 29 x 6-car sets | | still in use | None |
| Class 397; Civity | TransPennine Express (2016–2023) | TransPennine Express | CAF 2017–2019 | 12 x 5-car sets | | still in use | None |
| Class 800; AT300 | Virgin Trains East Coast and London North Eastern Railway (Note: Virgin ordered the Azumas and received a few, however, the franchise was transferred to LNER before any passenger service, where the remained were received, therefore, they were built under both operators.) | London North Eastern Railway | Hitachi, Kudamatsu & Newton Aycliffe 2014–2018 | 34 x 9-car sets 46 x 5-car sets | | still in use | None |
| Class 800; AT300 | Great Western Railway | Great Western Railway | Hitachi, Kudamatsu & Newton Aycliffe 2014–2018 | 34 x 9-car sets 46 x 5-car sets | | still in use | None |
| Class 801; AT300 | Virgin Trains East Coast and London North Eastern Railway | London North Eastern Railway | Hitachi Kudamatsu & Newton Aycliffe 2017–2020 | 30 x 9-car sets 12 x 5-car sets | | still in use | None |
| Class 802; AT300 | Great Western Railway | Great Western Railway | Hitachi Kudamatsu & Hitachi Rail Italy 2017–2020 | 46 x 5-car 14 x 9-car sets | | still in use | None |
| Class 802; AT300 | Hull Trains | Hull Trains | Hitachi Kudamatsu & Hitachi Rail Italy 2017–2020 | 46 x 5-car 14 x 9-car sets | | still in use | None |
| Class 802; AT300 | TransPennine Express (2016–2023) | TransPennine Express | Hitachi Kudamatsu & Hitachi Rail Italy 2017–2020 | 46 x 5-car 14 x 9-car sets | | still in use | None |
| Class 803; AT300 | Lumo | Lumo | Hitachi Newton Aycliffe | 5 x 5-car sets | | still in use | None |
| Class 805; AT300 | Avanti West Coast | Avanti West Coast | Hitachi Newton Aycliffe | 13 x 5-car sets | | still in use | None |
| Class 807; AT300 | Avanti West Coast | Avanti West Coast | Hitachi Newton Aycliffe | 10 x 7-car sets | | still in use | None |
| Class 810; Aurora | East Midlands Railway | | Hitachi Newton Aycliffe | 33 x 5-car sets | | still in use | None |
| Class 895 | Avanti West Coast | | Alstom Crewe & Derby/Hitachi Newton Aycliffe | 54 x 8-car sets | | not yet in service | None |
| Class 897; Civity | London North Eastern Railway | | CAF | 10 x 10-car sets | | not yet in service | None |

== DC EMUs ==
=== Southern Region units ===
The Southern Railway and its successor, the Southern Region of British Rail, used three letter codes to classify their DC EMU fleets, as shown after the TOPS class numbers. Southern Region EMUs were classified in the 400 series under TOPS.

==== Pre-Nationalisation ====
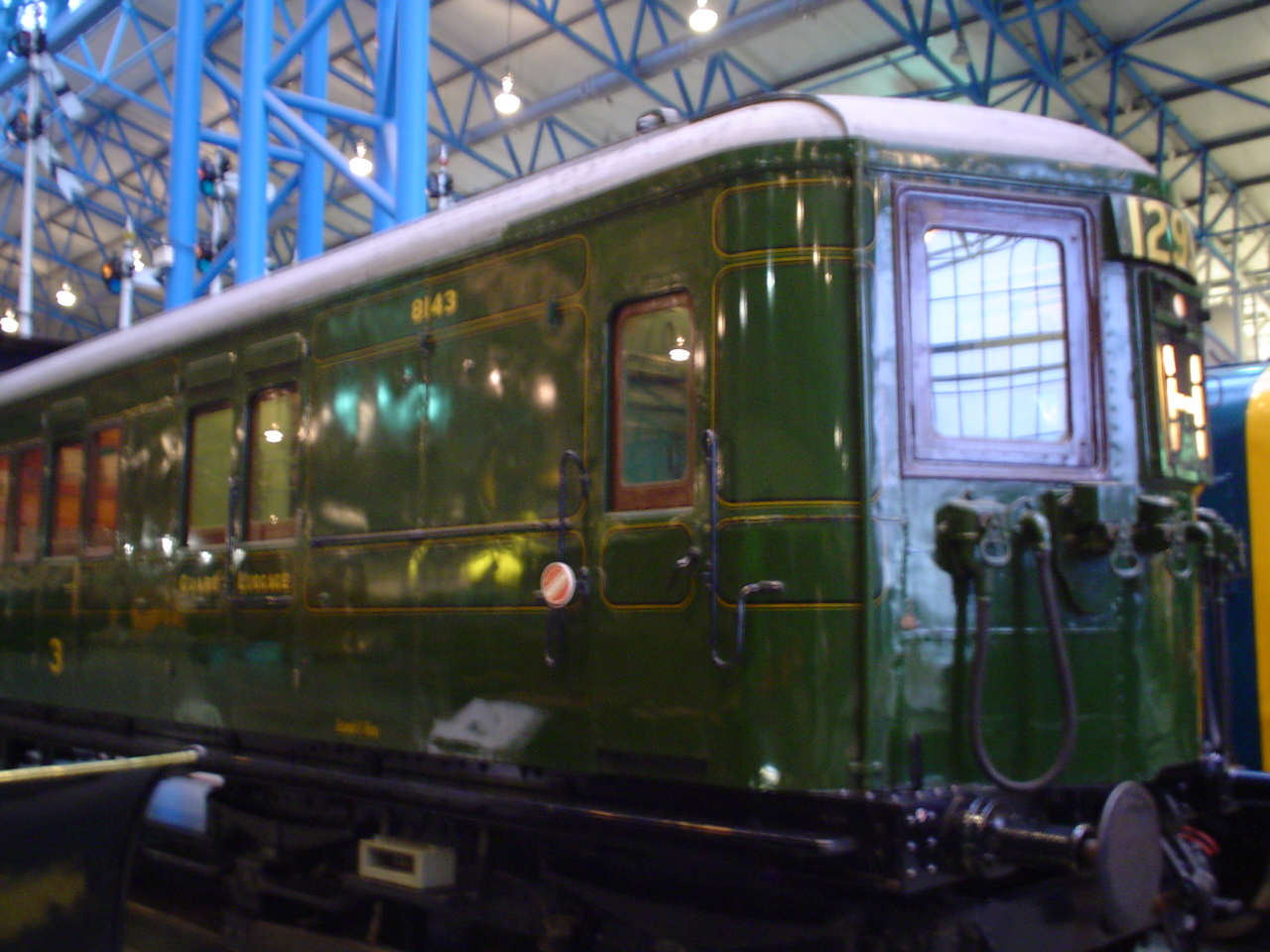
4-SUB unit no. 8143 at the National Railway Museum

| TOPS class | SR class | Name or Information | Built | Quantity (sets) | Withdrawn | Notes | Image | Scrapped |
|---|---|---|---|---|---|---|---|---|
| Class 401 | 2-BIL | | 1935–38 | 152 | 1965–71 | | | 151 |
| Class 402 | 2-Hal | | 1938–1939; 1948; 1955 | 100 | 1969–71 | | | All |
| Class 402 | 2-Pan | | 1938–1939; 1948; 1955 | 100 | 1969–71 | | | All |
| | 2-Nol | | 1934–36 | 78 | 1956–59 | | | All |
| | 2-SL | South London | 1929 | 8 | 1954 | | | All |
| | 2-WIM | Wimbledon-Croydon | 1929 | 4 | 1954 | | | All |
| | 3-SUB | | 1946–51 | 184 | 1976–83 | | | All |
| | 4-BUF | | 1937–38 | 85 | 1964 | | | All |
| Class 404 | 4-Cor | | 1937–38 | 85 | 1968–71 | | | 28 |
| | 4-DD | Double Deck EMU | 1949 | 2 | 1971 | | | |
| | 4-Gri | | | | | | | All |
| | 4-LAV | | 1930–32; 1939–40 | 35 | 1968–69 | | | All |
| | 4-RES | | | | | | | All |
| Class 405 | 4-SUB | | | | | | | About 184 |
| Class 403 | 5-BEL | Brighton Belle London Victoria-Brighton | 1932 | 15 | 1 (p) | | | 2 |
| | 6-CIT | London Bridge-Brighton | | | | | | 38 in total |
| | 6-Pan | Pantry units | | | | | | 38 in total |
| | 6-Pul | Pullman London Victoria-Brighton | | | | | | 38 in total |

==== Mark 1 and 2 bodyshell ====
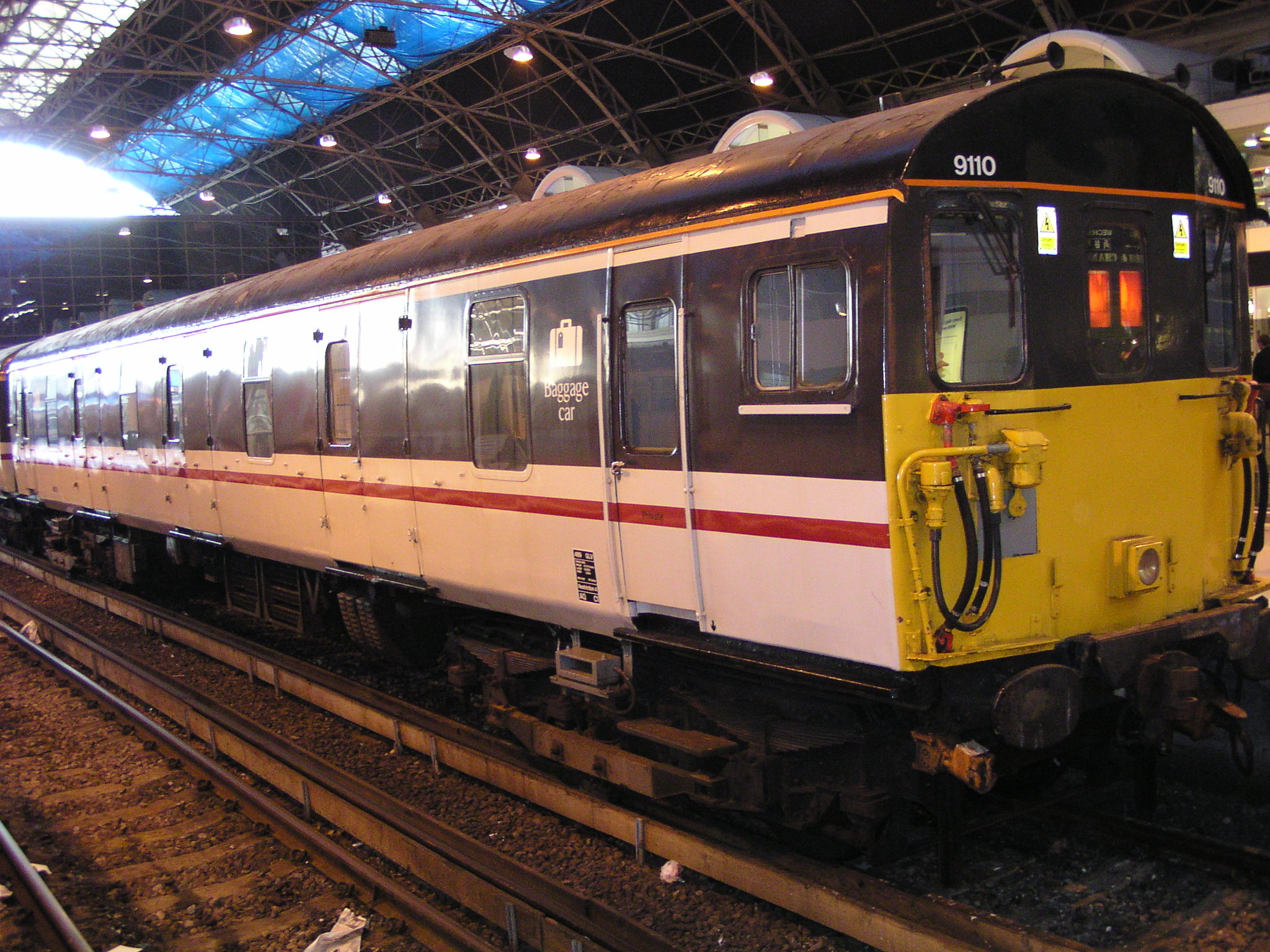
Gatwick Express Class 489 unit no. 489110 at London Victoria

| TOPS class | SR class | Name or Information | Image | Scrapped |
|---|---|---|---|---|
| Class 410 | 4-Bep | | | About 114 in total |
| Class 411 | 4-Cep | | | About 114 in total |
| Class 412 | 4-Bep | | | About 114 in total |
| Class 413 | 4-Cap | 2 x 2Hap permanently coupled | | All |
| Class 414 | 2-Hap | | | 207 |
| Class 415 | 4-EPB | | | 282 |
| Class 416 | 2-EPB | | | 121 |
| Class 418 | 2-Sap | 2Hap units with declassified 1st Class accommodation | | All |
| Class 419 | MLV | London-Dover/Folkestone boat trains | | 2 |
| Class 420 | 4-Big | | | About 140 in total |
| Class 421 | 4/3-Cig; 3-Cop | Last 2 units of this type in service were withdrawn in 2010 | | About 140 in total |
| Class 422 | 4-Big; 8-Dig | | | About 140 in total |
| Class 423 | 4-Vep; 4-Vop | | | About 188 in total |
| Class 427 | 4-Veg | First stock used for Gatwick Express | | About 188 in total |
| Class 430 | 4-Rep | | | 14 |
| Class 431 | 6-Rep | | | 14 |
| Class 432 | 4-Rep | | | 14 |
| Class 438 | 3-TC; 4-TC | | | 27 |
| Class 480 | 8-Vab | | | - |
| Class 482 (I) | 8-Mig | | | - |
| Class 488 | | Gatwick Express Trailers | | 14 |
| Class 489 | GLV | Gatwick Express driving trailers | | 3 |
| Class 499 (I) | TLV | | | All |

==== Tube Stock ====
Rolling stock built to London Underground deep tube loading gauge.

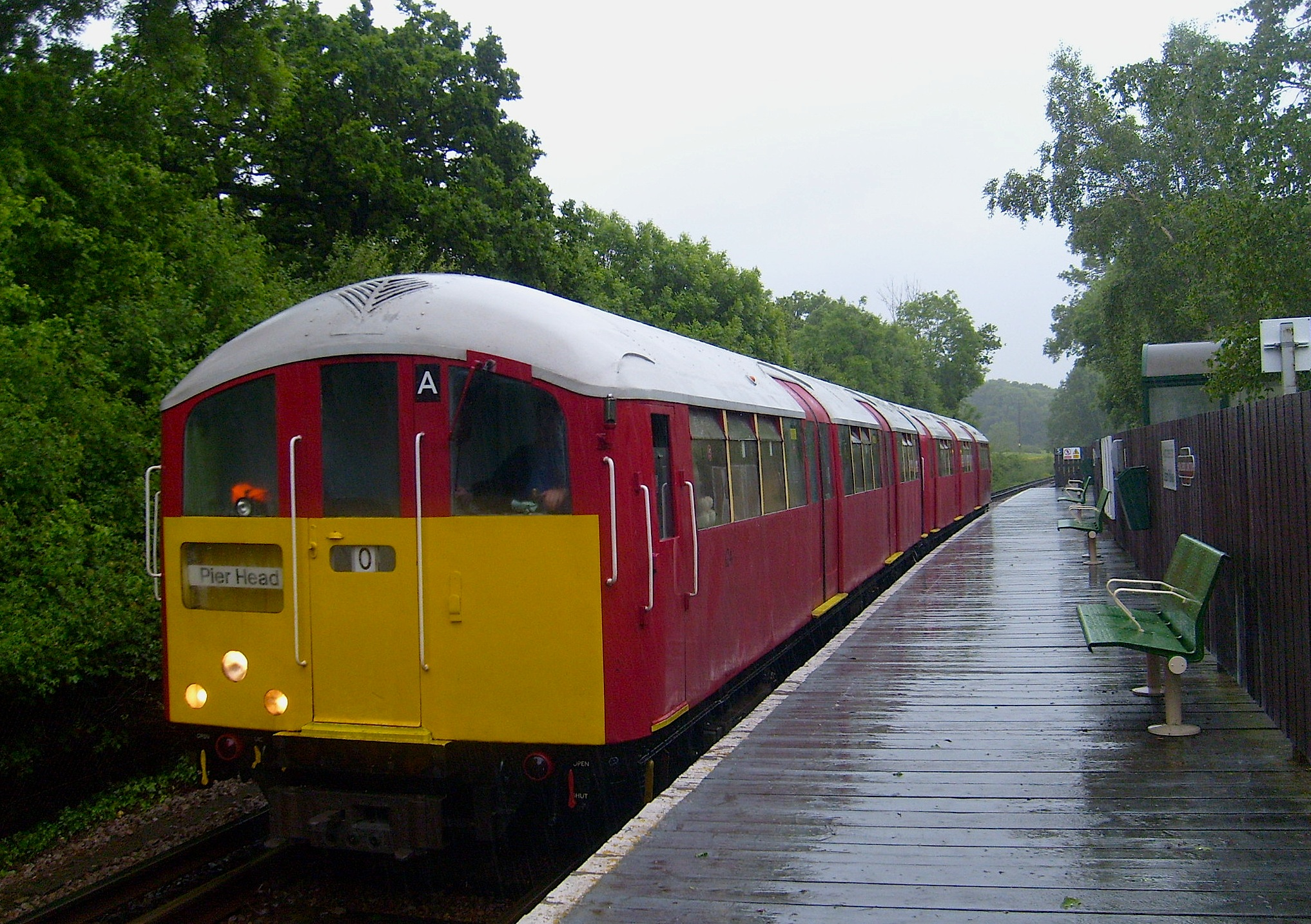
Island Line Class 483 unit no. 483004 at Smallbrook Junction

| TOPS class | Number Built | SR class | Name or Information | Image | Number Scrapped |
|---|---|---|---|---|---|
| Class 482 (II) | 10 x 4-car | | Waterloo & City line sold to London Underground | | None |
| Class 483 | 10 x 2-car | | Island Line ex LU 1938 stock | | 4 |
| Class 485 | 6 x 4-car | 4-Vec | ex LU Standard stock | | about 5 |
| Class 486 | 6 x 3-car | 3-Tis | ex LU Standard stock | | All |
| Class 487 | 28 x 1-car | | Waterloo & City Line | | 27 |

Note that TOPS class 499 is currently allocated to London Underground owned stock that needs to use Network Rail owned tracks. This does not involve any renumbering of the stock involved, and is only for electronic recording purposes.

==== Modern EMUs ====
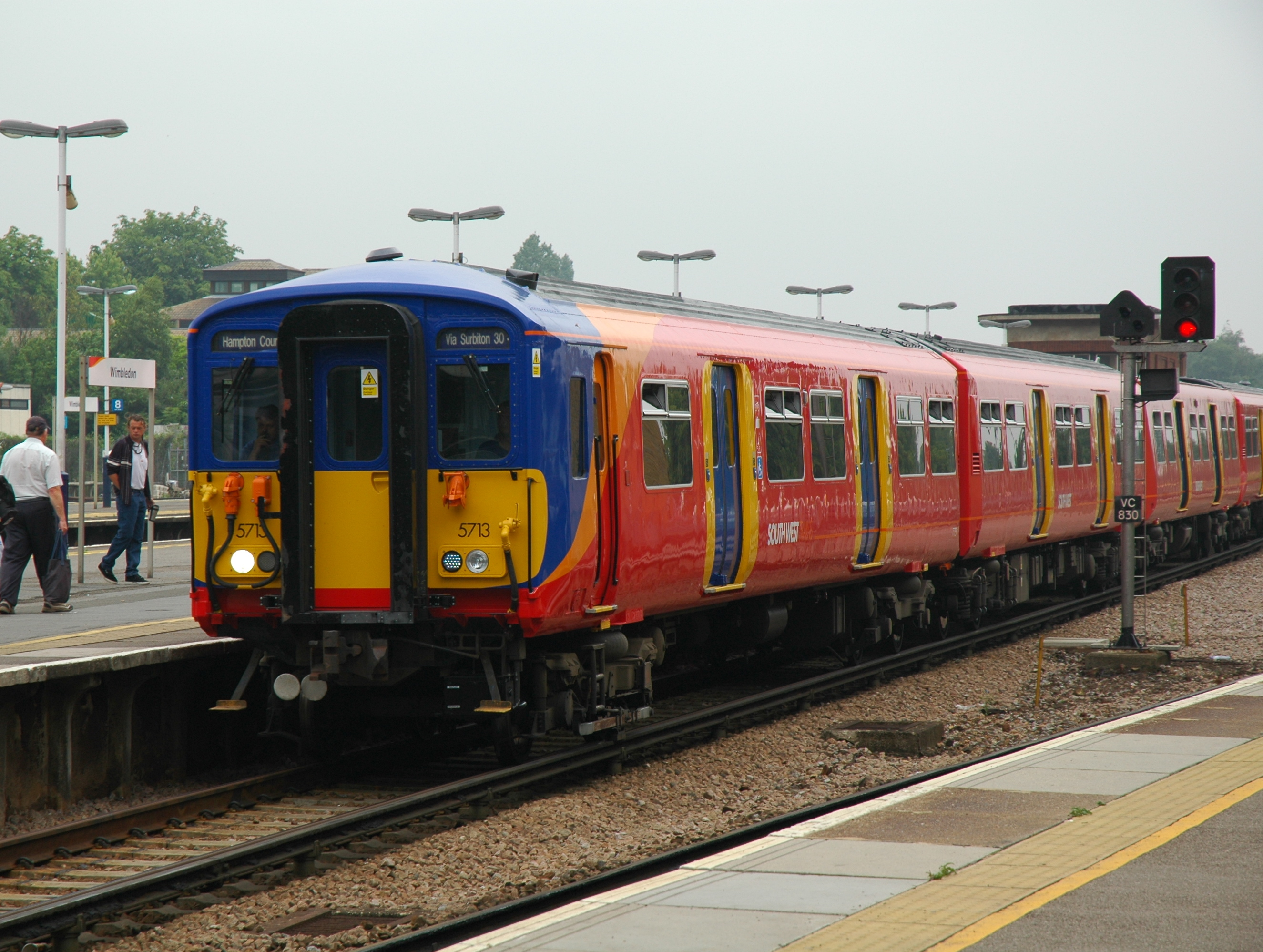
South West Trains Class 455 unit no. 455713 at Wimbledon railway station

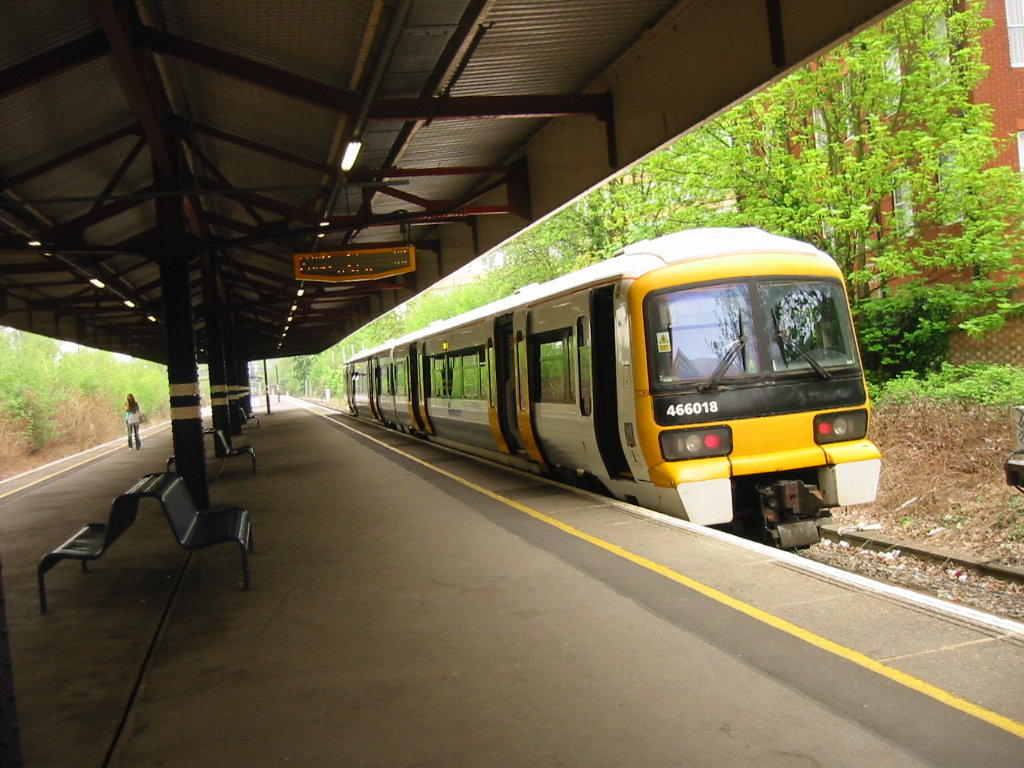
Southeastern Class 466 unit no. 466018 at Bromley North railway station

| TOPS class | SR class | Number Built | Name or Information | Image | Scrapped |
|---|---|---|---|---|---|
| Class 424 | | 1 | Networker Classic Prototype | | 1 |
| Class 442 | 5-Wes | 24 | Wessex Express | | 119 cars |
| Class 444 | 5-Des | 45 | Siemens Desiro | | None |
| Class 445 | 4-Pep | 2 | Second Generation EMU prototype – 4 car | | All |
| Class 446 | 2-Pep | 1 | Second Generation EMU prototype – 2 car | | All |
| Class 447 | | Never Built | Proposed Battersea Bullet | | Never built |
| Class 450 | 4-Des | 127 | Siemens Desiro | | None |
| Class 455 | | 137 | | | 83 |
| Class 456 | | 24 | | | All |
| Class 457 | | 1 | DC Networker prototype | | 1 |
| Class 458 | 5-Jop | 36 | Juniper | | None |
| Class 460 | 8-Gat | 8 | Juniper – Gatwick Express | | DMLFOs (4 cars) |
| Class 465 | | 147 | Networker – 4 car | | 24 |
| Class 466 | | 43 | Networker – 2 car | | 26 |
| Class 471 | | Never Built | Proposed Networker – Main Line Express | | Never built |
| Class 484 | 5 x 2-car | | Island Line D-Train ex-LU D78 Stock | | None |

=== Other DC units ===
The 500 series classes were reserved for miscellaneous DC EMUs not from the Southern Region. This included the DC (third/fourth rail) lines in North London, Manchester and Merseyside and the OHLE lines in Greater Manchester. The DC electric network around Tyneside had been de-electrified by the time TOPS was introduced, and the stock withdrawn or transferred to the Southern Region.

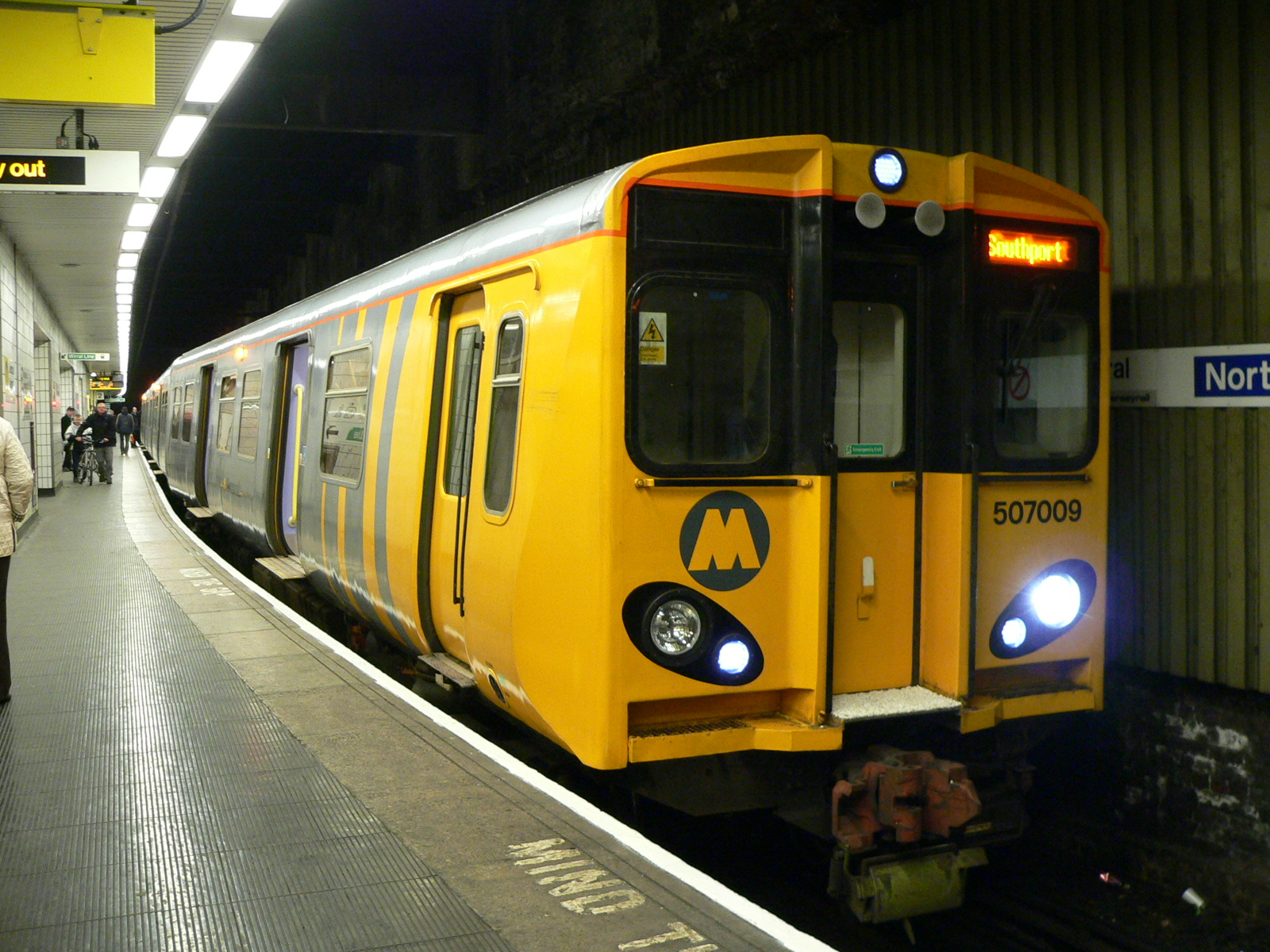
Merseyrail Class 507 unit no. 507009 at Liverpool Central railway station

TOPS classes

| Class | Info | Image | Number Built | Withdrawn | Notes | Scrapped |
|---|---|---|---|---|---|---|
| Class 501 | North London stock | | 57 | 1985 | 650 V Third & Fourth Rail | 56 |
| Class 502 | Liverpool-Southport/Ormskirk stock | | 61 | 1980 | 650 V Third Rail | 150 cars |
| Class 503 | Mersey-Wirral stock | | 45 | 1985 | 650 V Third Rail | 44 |
| Class 504 | Manchester-Bury stock | | 26 | 1991 | 1.2 kV Side Contact Third Rail (Unique on BR network) | 25 |
| Class 505 | Manchester-Altrincham stock | | 22 sets | 1971 | 1.5 kV OHLE | ? |
| Class 506 | Manchester-Hadfield/Glossop stock | | 8 | 1984 | 1.5 kV OHLE | About 7 |
| Class 507 | Merseyside stock | | 33 | 2022–2024 | 750 V Third Rail | 32 |
| Class 508 | Merseyside stock | | 43 | 2022–2024 | 750 V Third Rail | 41 |
| Class 510 | Original classification of Class 455 | | | | | |

Pre-TOPS classes

- Ex-LNER units (Tyneside stock)
- Ex-LNWR units (North London stock)
- Ex-LOR units (Liverpool Overhead Railway stock)
- Ex-LYR units (Manchester-Bury stock)
- Ex-Mersey Railway units (Merseyside DC stock)
- Ex-W&CR units (Waterloo & City Railway stock)

== Battery electric multiple unit (BEMU) ==
The original BEMU was a one-off unit, withdrawn before the introduction of TOPS. A new generation battery EMU (called an Independently Powered Electric Multiple Unit) was created in 2014, converted from a Class 379.

| Class | Info | Image | Notes |
|---|---|---|---|
| BEMU | Experimental 2 Car | | |
| Class 230 | D-Train | | DEMU; DMU; Diesel-Battery hybrid |

== Non National Rail units ==
All rail vehicles operating on Network Rail infrastructure are required to be given TOPS codes. For this reason, London Underground, South Yorkshire Supertram and Tyne & Wear Metro trains have their own TOPS classes:

| Class | Info | Image | Notes |
|---|---|---|---|
| Class 398; CITYLINK | Transport for Wales Rail tram-train stock | | Used on Valley Lines services with planned street running through Cardiff |
| Class 399; CITYLINK | South Yorkshire Supertram tram-train stock | | Used for service to Rotherham via the Dearne Valley line |
| Class 499 (II) | London Underground rolling stock | | Classification given to all London Underground stock operating on Network Rail, regardless of line |
| Class 555; METRO | Tyne & Wear Metro rolling stock | | Replacement Tyne and Wear Metro fleet |
| Class 599 | Tyne & Wear Metro rolling stock | | Runs on Network Rail tracks between Pelaw and Sunderland |

== See also ==
- List of British Rail classes
- List of British Rail modern traction locomotive classes
- List of British Rail diesel multiple unit classes
- British Rail locomotive and multiple unit numbering and classification
- SR multiple unit numbering and classification
- British Rail coach type codes
- Electric multiple unit
