= Bussow =

Bussow is a German surname. Notable people with name include:

- Conrad Bussow (1552 or 1553–1617), German mercenary
- Johann Büssow (born 1973), German historian

== See also ==
- Busso (surname)
- Busson (surname)
