= Busso (surname) =

Busso is an Italian surname. Notable people with the surname include:

- Elena Busso (born 1976), Italian volleyball player
- Giuseppe Busso, Italian vehicle designer
- Francisco de Busso (died 1576), Italian servant of Mary, Queen of Scots

== See also ==
- Bussow
- Busson (surname)
