= British Rail Class 365 =

British electric passenger trains

British Rail Class 365 Networker Express
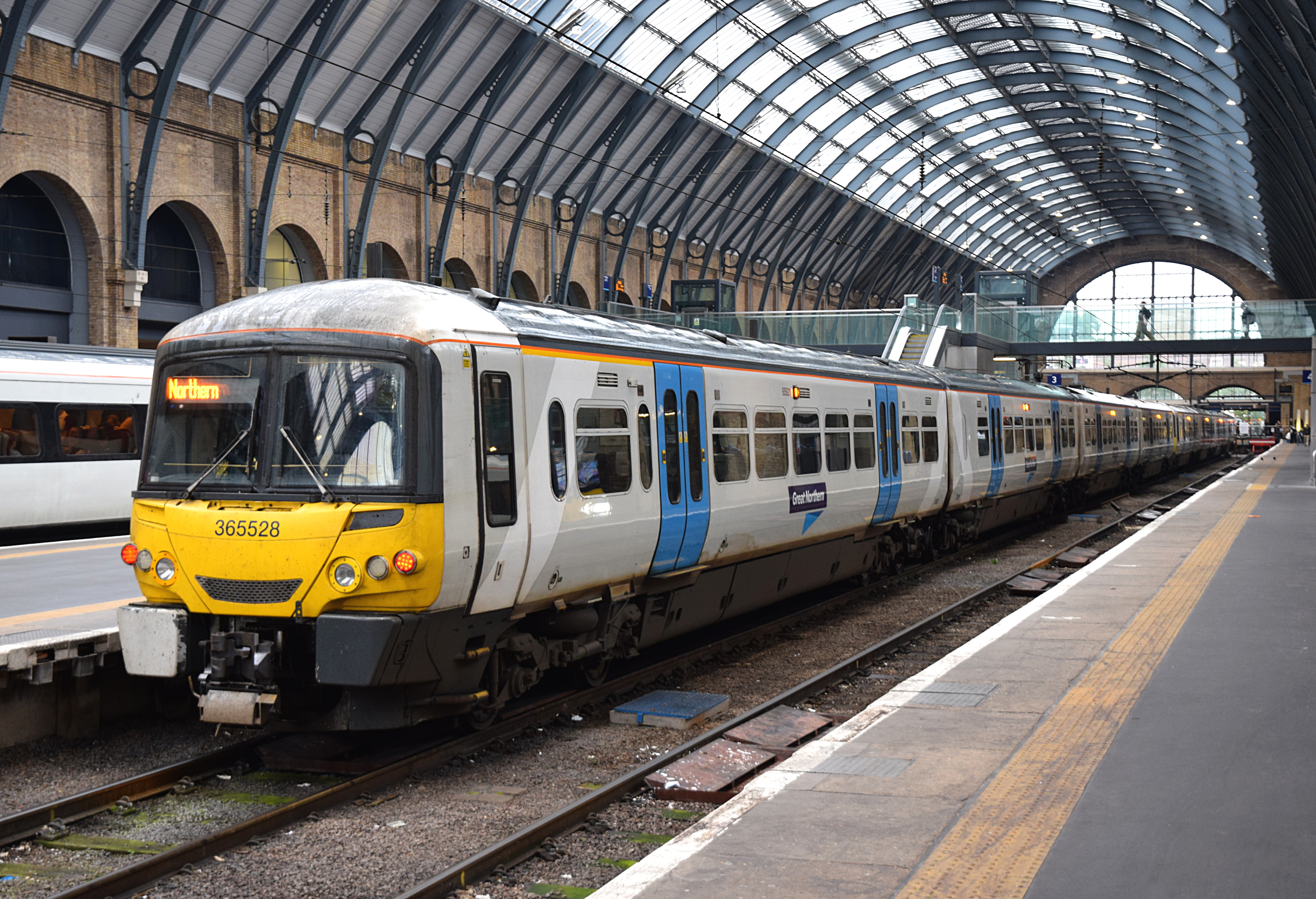
- Great Northern Class 365 at London King's Cross in 2019

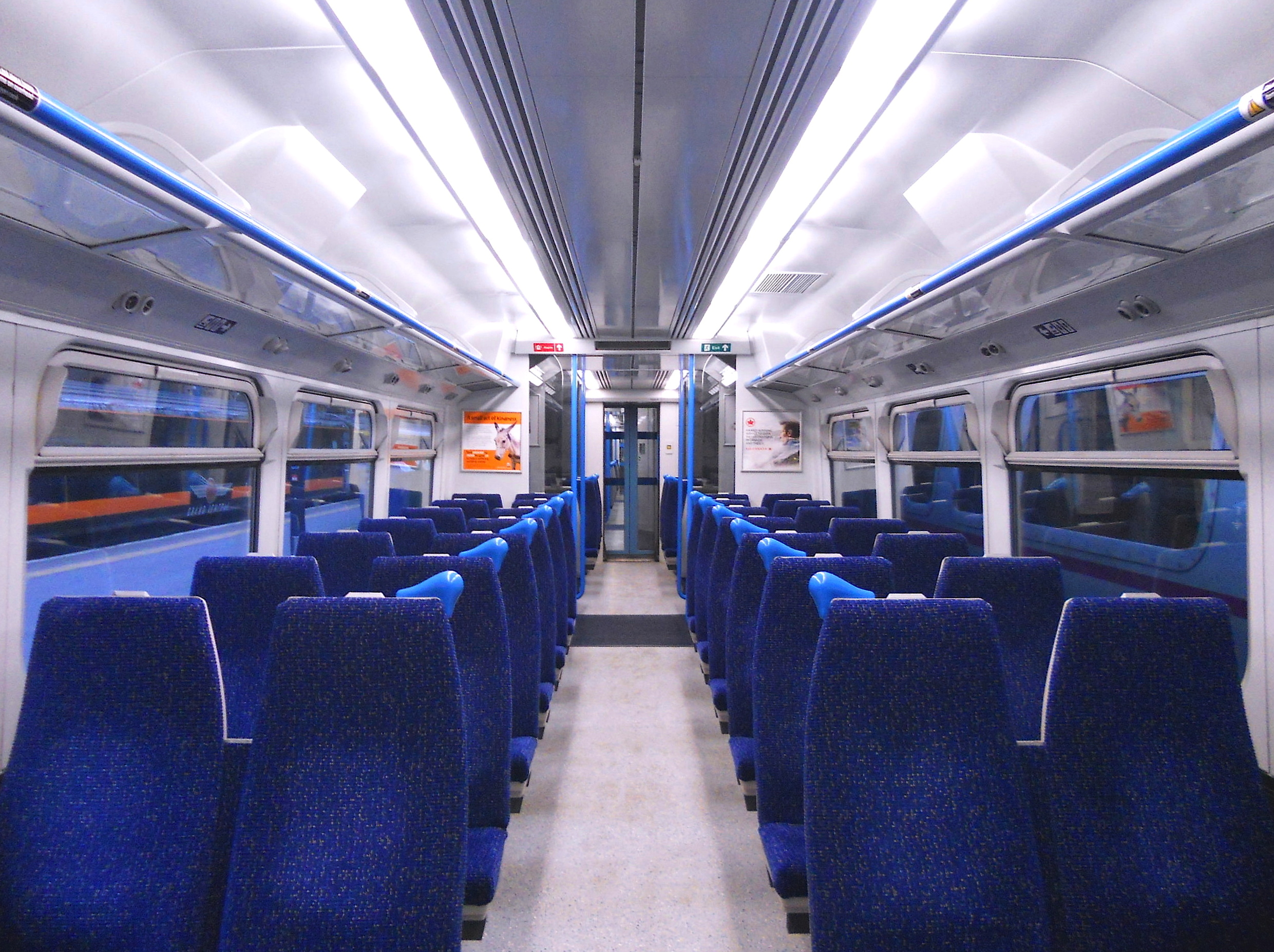
- Refurbished Great Northern standard-class saloon
- In service: 13 October 1996 – 15 May 2021
- Manufacturer: ABB Transportation
- Built at: Holgate Road Works, York
- Family name: Networker
- Constructed: 1994–1995
- Refurbished: 2013–2016 at Bombardier Ilford
- Scrapped: 2021–2022
- Number built: 41
- Number in service: 0
- Number preserved: 0 (3 vehicles only)
- Number scrapped: 41
- Successor: Class 385 (ScotRail); Class 387 (Great Northern)
- Formation: 4 cars per unit: DMOC-TOSL-PTOSL-DMOC
- Fleet numbers: 365501–365541
- Capacity: 263 seats (24 first-class, 239 standard)
- Operators: Abellio ScotRail; Connex South Eastern; First Capital Connect; Great Northern; Network SouthEast; South Eastern Trains; West Anglia Great Northern
- Depots: Hornsey (London); Shields Road (Glasgow)

Specifications
- Car body construction: Aluminium
- Train length: 81.9 m (268 ft 8 in)
- Car length: DM vehs.: 20.89 m (68 ft 6 in); Trailers: 20.06 m (65 ft 10 in)
- Width: 2.81 m (9 ft 3 in)
- Height: 3.77 m (12 ft 4 in)
- Maximum speed: 100 mph (161 km/h)
- Weight: 151.62 tonnes (149.23 long tons; 167.13 short tons)
- Traction system: GEC Alsthom GTO-VVVF
- Traction motors: 8 × 3-phase AC; GEC Alsthom G354CX
- Power output: 1,256 kW (1,684 hp)
- Acceleration: 0.67 m/s^{2} (2.2 ft/s^{2})
- Electric systems: 25 kV 50 Hz AC overhead; 750 V DC third rail (removed)
- Current collection: Pantograph (AC) (Brecknell Willis high-speed); Contact shoe (DC) (removed)
- UIC classification: Bo′Bo′+2′2′+2′2′+Bo′Bo′
- Safety systems: AWS; TPWS; ETCS (trial, one unit only)
- Coupling system: Tightlock
- Multiple working: Within class
- Track gauge: 1,435 mm (4 ft 8 1/2 in) standard gauge

Notes/references
- Sourced from unless otherwise noted.

The British Rail Class 365 Networker Express was a fleet of 41 dual-voltage (25 kV 50 Hz AC and 750 V DC) electric multiple unit passenger trains that were built by ABB at Holgate Road Carriage Works in 1994 and 1995.

The Class 365 was derived from the Class 465 EMU after the planned "Universal Networker" Classes 371 and 381 were not funded through to production. An initial prototype that better suited the operation of long-distance services was developed from an existing unit (designated as Class 465/3), as the new type was intended to operate services in South East England and on the Great Northern Route. The purchase of 41 Class 365s was authorised in late 1993; they would be the last trains to be built at the Holgate Road works prior to its closure. Due to the front end of refurbished units resembling a smiling face, the trains have been nicknamed "Happy Trains" by enthusiasts.

Deliveries began in 1994 under Network SouthEast and continued after operations transferred to the private sector; the final unit was delivered to West Anglia Great Northern (WAGN) in July 1998. Connex South Eastern received 16 units while West Anglia Great Northern received 25. During 2004, South Eastern Trains opted to transfer all of its sets to WAGN.

The Class 365 has been involved in several accidents, which has included fatalities; the most serious accident to date occurred at Potters Bar in 2002. In September 2014, all units were transferred with the Thameslink, Southern & Great Northern franchise to Govia Thameslink Railway. In June 2018, ten sets were transferred to Abellio ScotRail to operate services from Edinburgh to Glasgow and Stirling. On 15 May 2021, Great Northern withdrew the last of its Class 365 sets. During July 2021, all of the Class 365s were acquired by Eversholt Rail Group; all but 3 vehicles have been scrapped. Newer types of rolling stock, such as the Class 385s and Class 387s, have typically been introduced to replace the type with various operators.

== Background ==
In the early 1990s, the Networker family was entering large-scale service in the Network SouthEast sector – both third-rail 'Networker' EMUs (Class 465/Class 466) and 'Network Turbo' DMUs (Class 165/Class 166) were in service, with proposals for others, including a so-called "Universal Networker", intended as Classes 371 and 381, that would have dual-voltage capability. However, by 1992, no work had been done in the development of these due to a lack of funding, so a replacement plan was required. For this, the Class 465 was modified for longer-distance services – a prototype was converted from an existing unit (designated as Class 465/3) to determine suitability, before funding was authorised during late 1993 for the purchase of 41 dual-voltage EMUs, each of four cars. These became the Class 365. Network SouthEast had successfully advocated in favour of the Class 365 project to secure investment from the British government; however, this came at the expense of competing proposals, including InterCity's envisioned InterCity 250 series of high speed trains.

== Description ==
Although specified as a dual-voltage unit, Class 365s never operated with this capability since they were built with only one system of traction current pickup.

The first 16 units (365501 to 365516), which worked briefly for Network SouthEast before the South Eastern franchise was awarded to Connex South Eastern, were originally supplied only with DC shoe gear for use on the 750 V DC third-rail system. In this configuration the maximum speed was 90 mph (145 km/h). During testing and commissioning, 365502 ran briefly on the AC network, this being the main reason for the unit being chosen to be subleased to West Anglia Great Northern (WAGN) in the aftermath of the Potters Bar accident in 2002.

When they transferred to WAGN for use with 25 kV 50 Hz AC overhead line traction supply, the shoes and associated equipment were removed and a Brecknell Willis high speed pantograph was installed, along with other operator and voltage-specific modifications and testing by Bombardier Transportation at its Doncaster Works. However, the Class 365s retained the original 750 V DC electrical bus, meaning that when on 25 kV 50 Hz AC overhead lines the current was collected as AC, rectified to DC for the onboard systems, and then inverted back to AC for the three-phase traction motors. For running on overhead lines the maximum speed was raised to 100 mph (161 km/h).

Basic equipment consisted of:

- DMOC A – 4x Three-phase AC traction motors, traction inverter, sander
- TOSL – Compressor, auxiliary converter, universal access toilet
- PTOSL – Pantograph, transformer, auxiliary converter, small toilet
- DMOC B – 4x Three-phase AC traction motors, traction inverter, sander

Dynamic (rheostatic) braking on the two Driving Motor coaches was available in addition to disc brakes, via a system of brake blending.

In common with the whole Networker fleet, wheel slide protection (WSP) operated on every axle. Under braking conditions a blowdown valve released air from the brake cylinder of any axle if the rotational speed varies significantly from the average axle speed on the train.

Internal LED Passenger Information Display Systems and Auto-Announcers were fitted across the fleet.

== Ownership ==
In the lead up to the privatisation of British Rail, responsibility for the Class 365s passed to Eversholt Rail Group. However, because the British Railways Board had leased rather than purchased the Class 365s, under a clause in the original procurement contract, ownership of the remaining 40 sets passed to the Department for Transport subsidiary Train Fleet (2019) Limited in July 2019 after it was obliged to pay out the leases to the Royal Bank of Scotland in the event that the trains were not wanted. In July 2021, all were sold back to Eversholt after termination of their leases with Govia Thameslink Railway was agreed.

== Operations ==
=== South Eastern ===
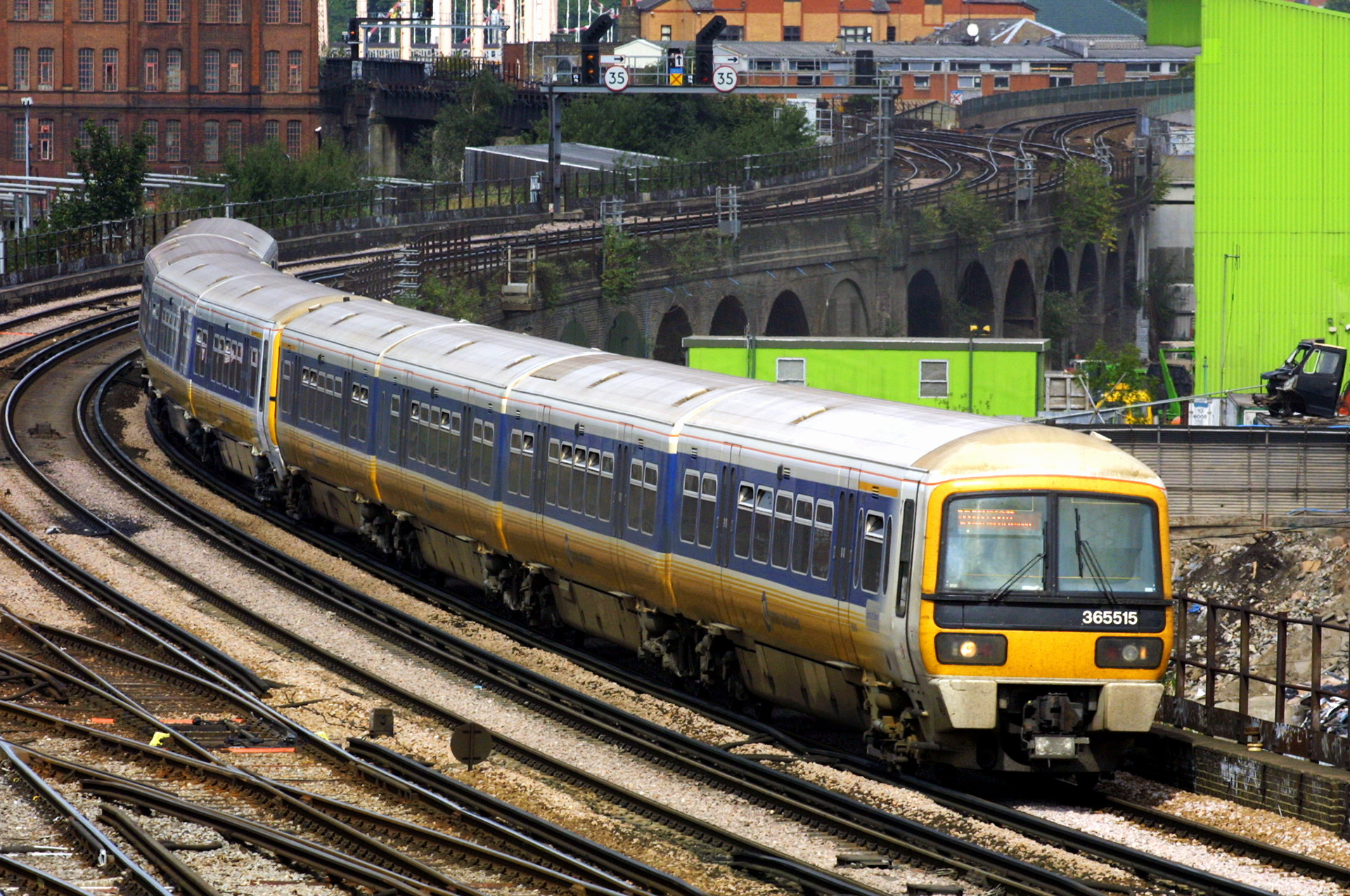
Connex South Eastern Class 365 at Wandsworth Road in 2001, with original cab ends.

The first 16 units were fitted for use on the 750 V DC lines. The first Class 365 set was delivered in November 1994 while testing commenced on 15 June 1995. Their first use in service occurred on 13 October 1996, but due to problems in obtaining a safety case, they did not enter full service with Connex South Eastern until 16 June 1997. Before it entered service, 365513 was damaged in a shunting incident at Chart Leacon TMD and was forwarded to Doncaster Works in November 1996.

From August 2002 until January 2003, 365502 was sublet to WAGN to provide cover after 365526 was involved in the Potters Bar accident. All passed with the franchise to South Eastern Trains in November 2003. All were transferred to West Anglia Great Northern during 2004.

=== Great Northern ===
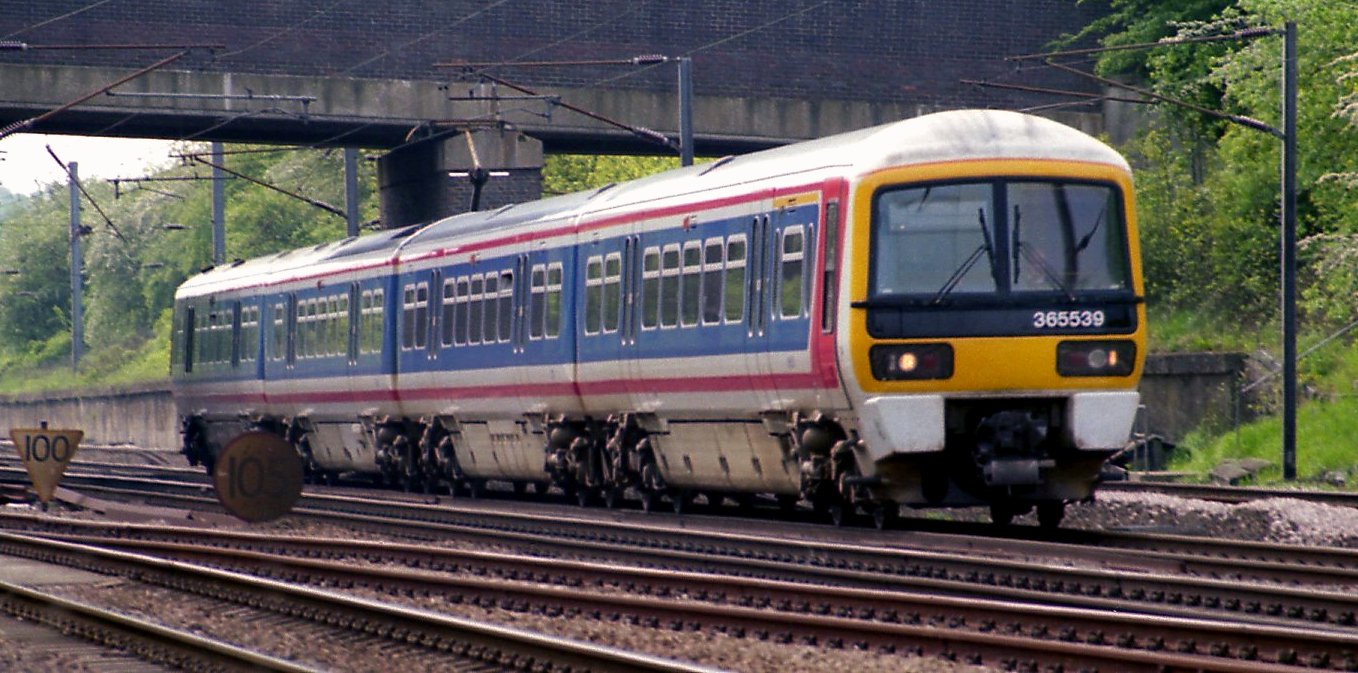
West Anglia Great Northern Class 365 near Potters Bar in 1998, still in Network SouthEast livery.

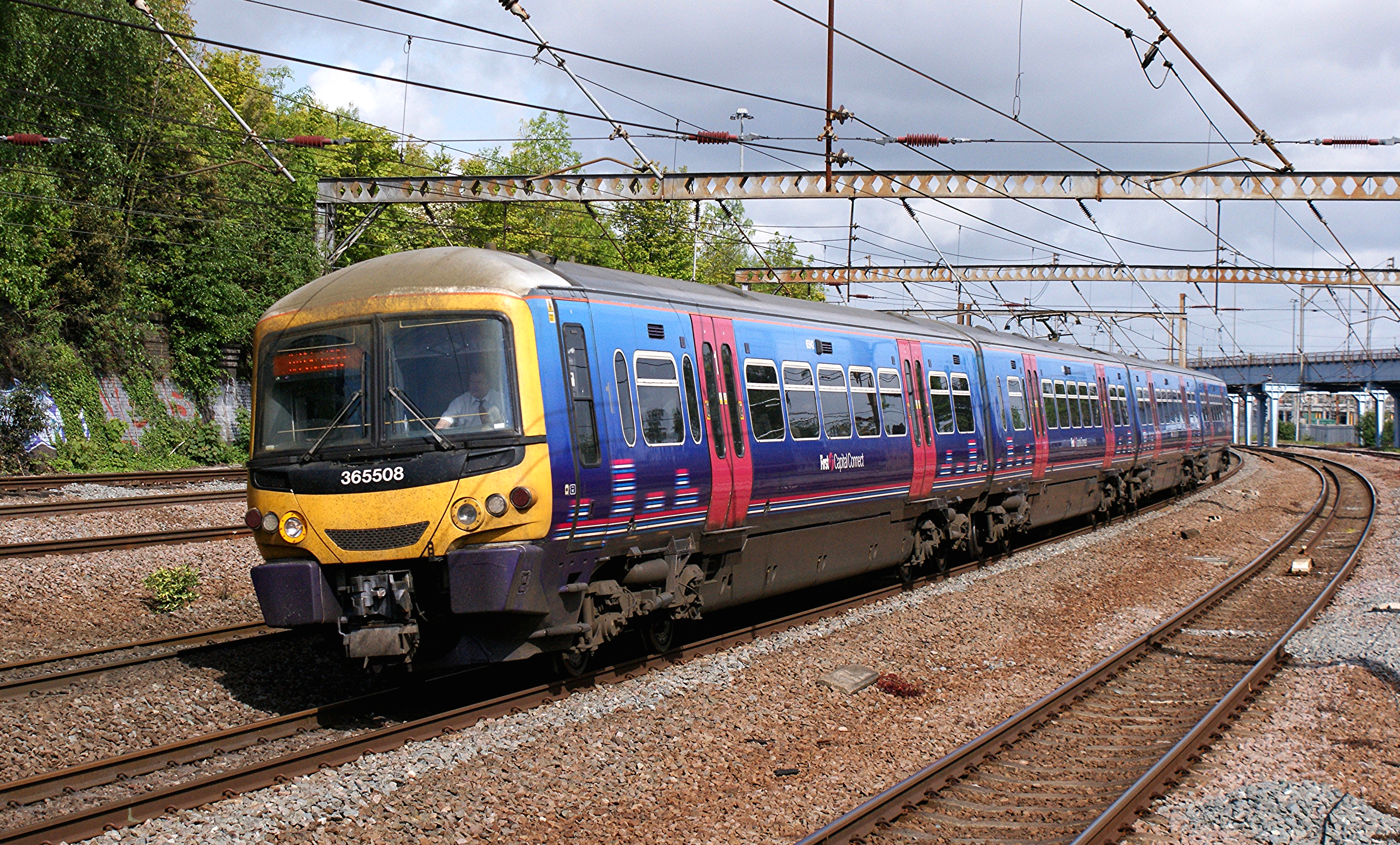
First Capital Connect Class 365 near Harringay in 2012

Twenty-five Class 365s (365517 to 365541) were delivered to Hornsey TMD to operate services on the East Coast Main Line from London King's Cross to Peterborough and King's Lynn. The first entered service with Network SouthEast on 9 December 1996. All sets were included in the transfer of the franchise to West Anglia Great Northern in January 1997. The last was delivered in July 1998.

As part of a project to fit driver's cab air conditioning, all units received new fronts between 2001 and 2002. In May 2002, 365526 was involved in the Potters Bar accident and was subsequently written off. From August 2002 until January 2003, 365502 was sublet from Connex South Eastern to provide cover. In 2004, all 16 of Connex South Eastern examples (365501 to 365516) were transferred to West Anglia Great Northern to release Class 317s for use by Thameslink.

The remaining 40 sets passed with the franchise to First Capital Connect during April 2006. A refurbishment program at Ilford EMU Depot commenced in January 2014. All units passed with the Thameslink, Southern & Great Northern franchise to Govia Thameslink Railway in September 2014.

In 2017, the Class 365 fleet were relegated to peak-hour services after the newer Class 387s and 700s entered service. It was proposed that some would be transferred to Great Western Railway to operate services on the Great Western Main Line from London Paddington to Newbury and Oxford, but this scheme was aborted when new Class 387s were purchased instead. Great Northern retained 21 sets to operate limited stop peak-time services between London King's Cross-Peterborough and London King's Cross-Royston. The remaining sets were placed in store in Ely.

During June 2018, ten sets were transferred to Abellio ScotRail to operate services from Edinburgh to Glasgow and Stirling. The other nine moved from Ely to King's Heath TMD, Northampton for further storage before moving to Crewe in September 2018.

In March 2021, it was announced that Great Northern would be withdrawing the remaining Class 365s from service in May 2021, in favour of Class 387s transferred from Gatwick Express. The last day of service for the Class 365s on Great Northern was on 15 May 2021.

=== ScotRail ===
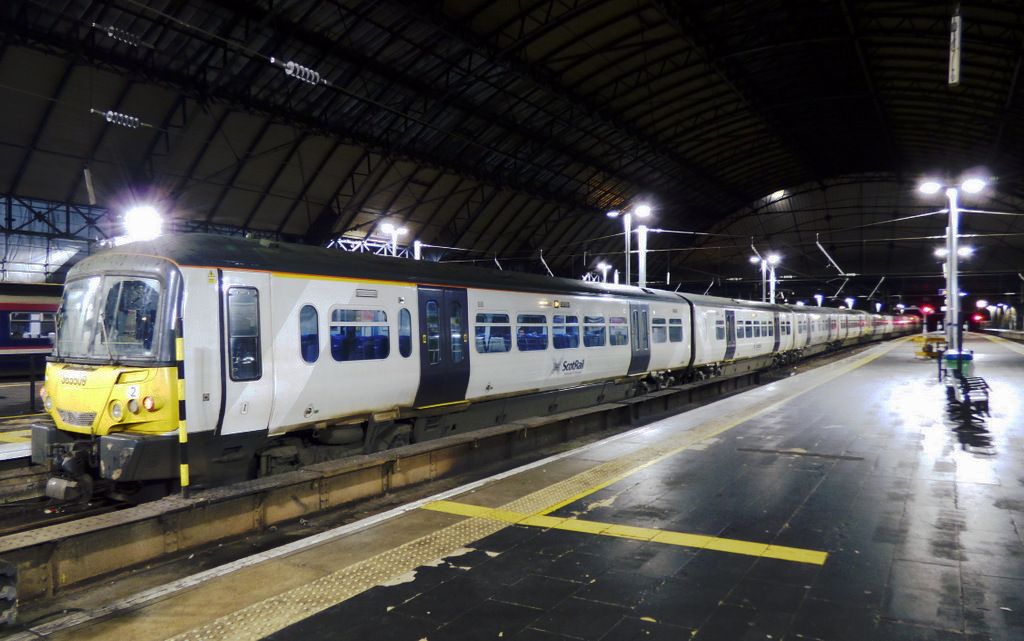
Abellio ScotRail Class 365 at Glasgow Queen Street in 2018

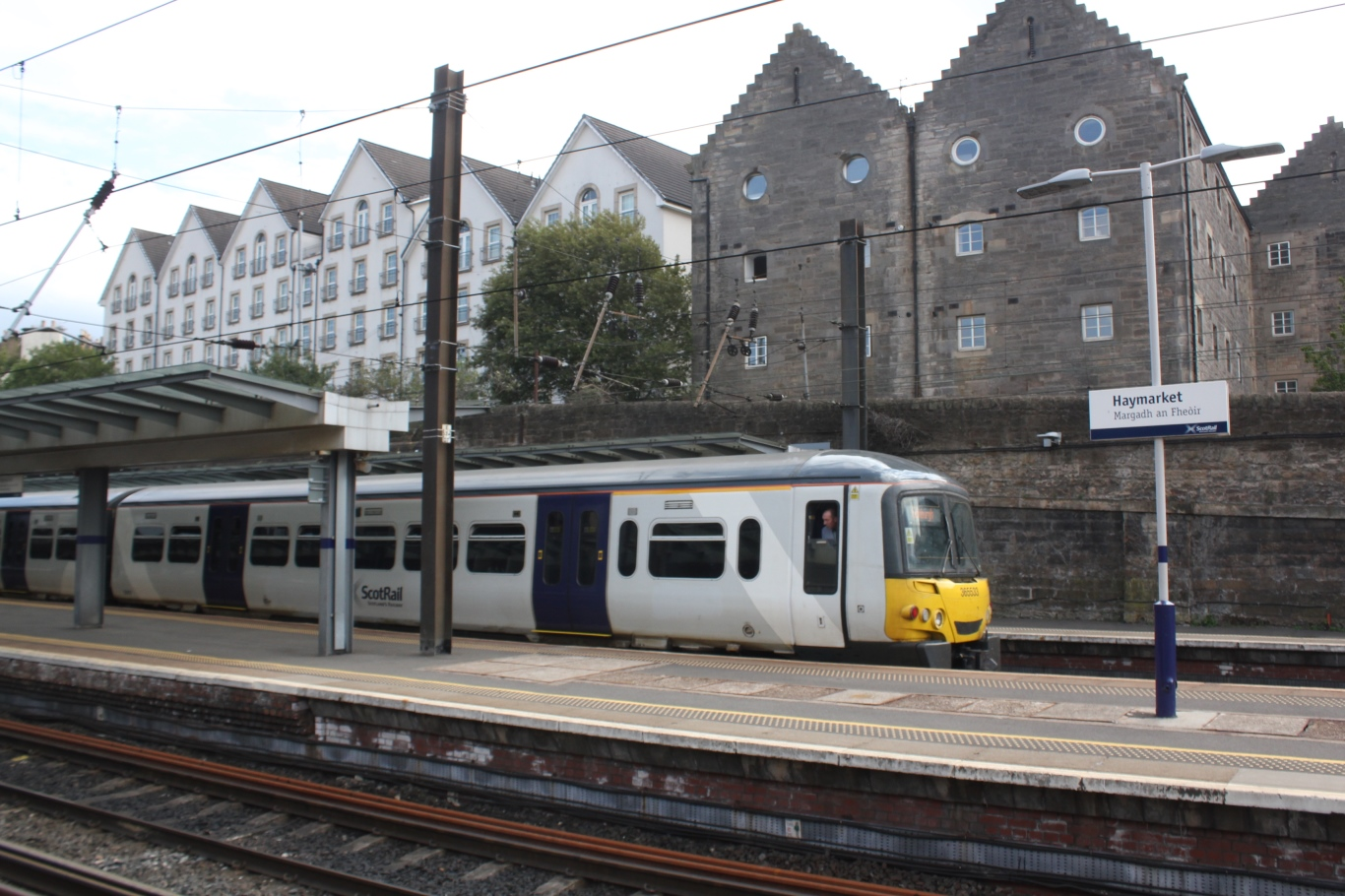
Abellio ScotRail Class 365 at Haymarket Station

In April 2018, ten Class 365s (509, 513, 517, 519, 521, 523, 525, 529, 533 and 537) were leased to Abellio ScotRail in response to a rolling stock shortage which was caused by the delayed entry to service of the new Class 385 EMUs and the imminent transfer of a number of DMUs to Arriva Rail North.They entered service on 23 June 2018 on Glasgow to Edinburgh and Stirling services after modifications and driver training.

In comparison with the three- and six-car DMUs previously used on the same routes by ScotRail, the eight-car Class 365 EMU sets provided an additional 17,200 seats per day, as well as having better acceleration and being cleaner. ScotRail only used the type briefly, and all units were withdrawn during March 2019 after issues with the Class 385 were resolved. These units were relocated to Crewe where they were kept in warm store by Rail Operations Group.

== Accidents and incidents ==
- 365526 – DMOC B and PTOSL were damaged in the Potters Bar rail accident in 2002. After being stored at Crewe Works and later Wolverton Works until the Rail Accident Investigation Branch had completed its investigations, two carriages were used for target practice at RAF Spadeadam, while one was taken to Ilford EMU Depot for stripping of spare parts.
- 365531 – DMOC A was damaged in a fatal collision with a tractor at Black Horse Drove crossing in October 2005.
- 365532 – DMOC A was damaged in a collision with a tractor at Hatson's User-Worked Crossing in September 2011.
- 365512 – DMOC B was damaged in a fatal collision with a car at Pleasants crossing in July 2012.
- A Class 365 unit collided at low speed with another unit it was due to couple onto at Cambridge station on 30 May 2015. Three passengers sustained slight injuries.
- 365520 – DMOC B was damaged in a collision with a Land Rover at Nairns User-Worked Crossing in August 2016.

== Fleet details ==
Units:
Class	Status	Qty.	Year built	Cars per unit	Unit numbers	Notes
365	Scrapped	41	1994–95	4	365501–541	Three vehicles preserved: DMSO(A) 65917, TSO 72287 from 365524 and DMSO(B) 65974 from 365540. Some vehicles from 365526 were sold to the UK Ministry of Defence and are used by the RAF for testing of explosives.

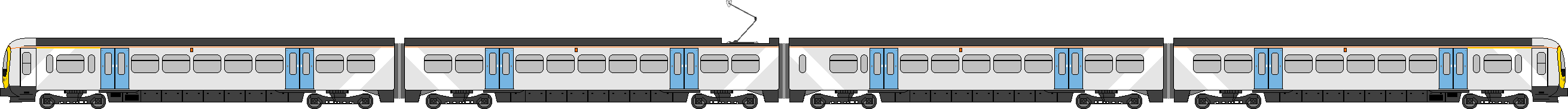
Illustration of a Great Northern Class 365 unit

=== Naming ===
Some were named. 365505 and 365515 were named by Connex South Eastern, and were subsequently removed. Vinyl nameplates with a pink backing were applied to the driving vehicles, behind the cab doors, by First Capital Connect. Following a repaint into Great Northern colours most were removed, but several were reapplied in the same style but with a light blue backing.

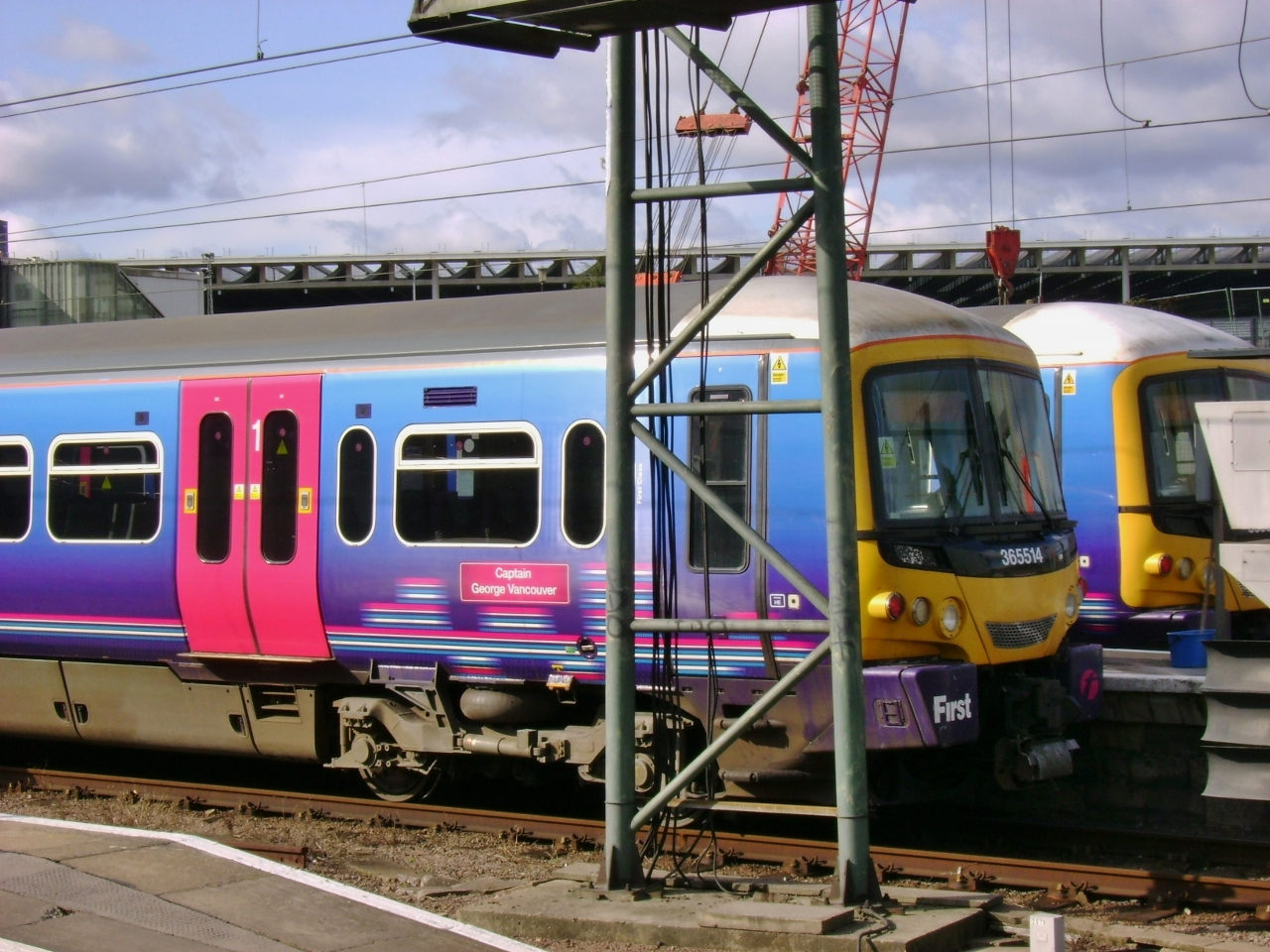
First Capital Connect 365514 Captain George Vancouver.

- 365505 – Spirit of Ramsgate
- 365506 – The Royston Express
- 365510 – Cambridge and Ely
- 365513 – Hornsey Depot
- 365514 – Captain George Vancouver
- 365515 – Spirit of Dover
- 365517 – Supporting Red Balloon
- 365518 – The Fenman
- 365519 – Discover Peterborough (Formerly Peterborough - Environment City)
- 365527 – Robert Stripe - Passengers' Champion
- 365530 – The Interlink Partnership promoting integrated transport in Hertfordshire since 1999
- 365531 – Norfolk - Nelson's County (Formerly Nelson's County - Norfolk)
- 365533 – Max Appeal
- 365536 – Rufus Barnes – Chief Executive of London TravelWatch for 25 years
- 365537 – Daniel Edwards (1974–2010) Cambridge Driver
- 365540 – Garden Cities of Hertfordshire

== Preservation ==
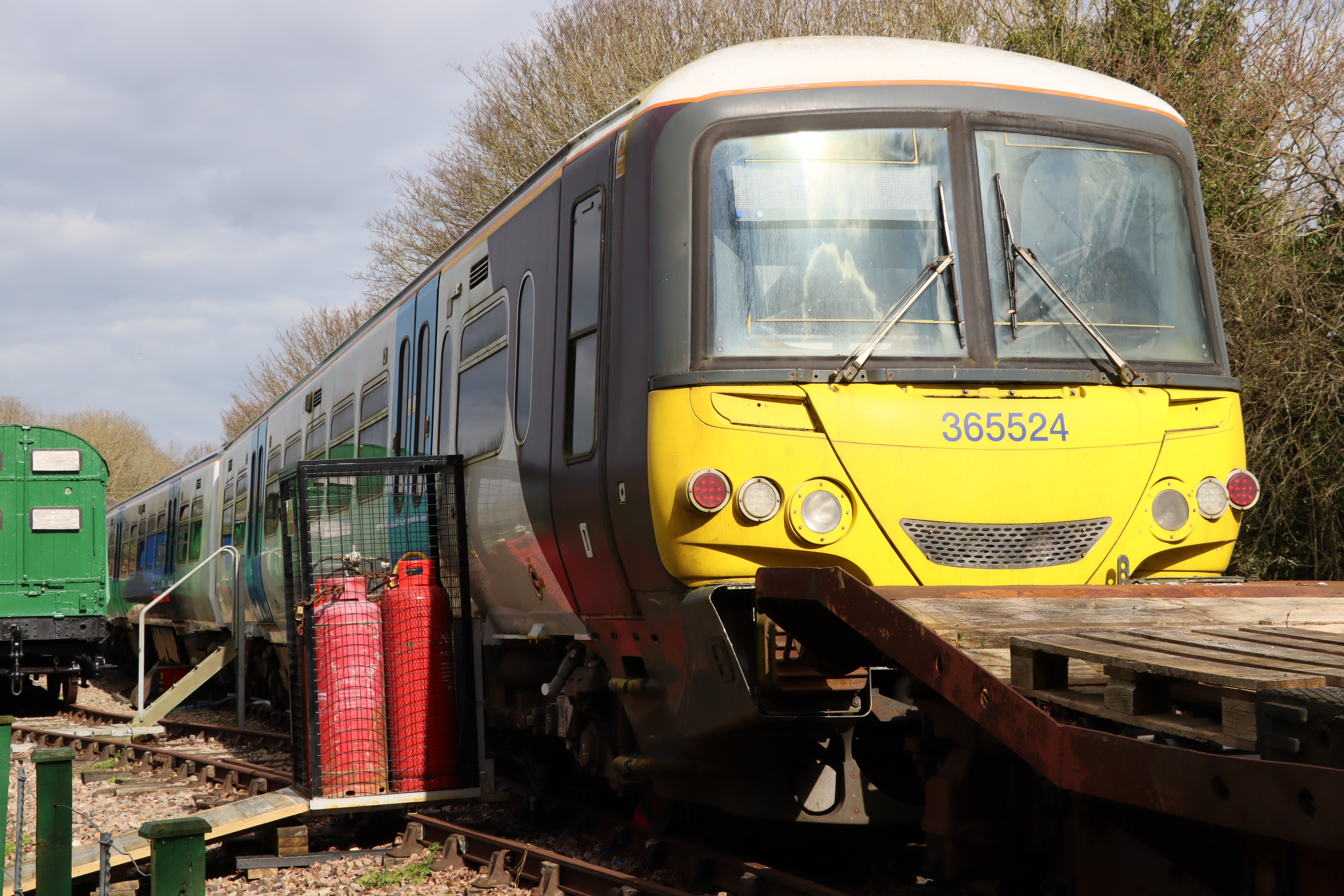
Ex-Great Northern 365524 stands at Eythorne

DMSO(A) 65917 and TSO 72287 from unit 365524 along with DMSO(B) 65974 from unit 365540 are to be put on static display at the East Kent Railway, where they will be used as a restaurant, an exhibition area, and a major events venue.
