= Elena Busso =

Italian volleyball player (born 1976)

Personal information
- Nationality: Italian
- Born: 4 January 1976 (age 50); Savigliano
- Height: 1.95 cm (1 in)

Volleyball information
- Position: Middle blocker

Career
Years	Teams
1994-1995; 1995-1996; 1996-1997; 1997-1998; 1998-1999; 1999-2000; 2000-2001; 2001-2002; 2002-2003; 2003-2004; 2004-2006; 2006-2007; 2007-2009	(Italy) Volley 2000 Spezzano (Italy) Vicenza Volley (Italy) Verona Volley (Italy) Despar Perugia (Italy) Vicenza Volley (Italy) Clai Imola (Italy) Viva Volley Tortoreto (Italy) Edison Volley Modena (Italy) Jogging Volley Altamura (Italy) Terra Sarda Tortoli (Italy) Pallavolo Corridonia (Italy) River Volley Piacenza (Italy) Chieri Volley

Elena Busso (born 4 January 1976) is an Italian former volleyball player.

== Sporting achievements ==
=== Clubs ===
Italian Cup:

- 2002

Challenge Cup:

- 2002
