= British Rail Classes 341 and 342 =

Proposed British electric passenger trains

British Rail Class 341 and 342 Networker
- Artists impression of Class 341
- Family name: Networker
- Number built: Never built
- Operators: Network South East
- Lines served: Intended - Crossrail (341); CTRL (342)

Class 341 and Class 342 were proposed electric multiple unit classes from the Networker series, to be introduced in the late 1990s. The trains were planned to run on the Channel Tunnel Rail Link and Crossrail projects. Both projects were halted in the early 1990s, following the early 1990s recession. With the subsequent privatisation of British Rail in 1994, neither train was ordered.

== Class 341 ==
Class 341 was intended as the rolling stock for the Crossrail project, and would have entered service in the late 1990s. A mock-up unit demonstrating the design of the train (and moquette) was built in 1991. At one point, the Class 341 would form part of the Networker family of trains as 'Networker Crossrail'. The Crossrail project was rejected by Parliament in 1994, and the train was not ordered.

The specifications drawn up for the Class 341 were subsequently used as a base for laying down specifications for the new Class 345 units built to run on Crossrail. The Bombardier built Class 345 units were introduced in June 2017, with the Crossrail project opening as the Elizabeth line in May 2022.

== Class 342 ==
Class 342 was intended to operate domestic services on the Channel Tunnel Rail Link (CTRL) high speed line between London and the Kent coast. Plans for the high speed line were delayed in the early 1990s, and the trains never got beyond the proposal stage.

The CTRL (now High Speed 1) was subsequently built from 1998 onwards, and was completed in 2007. Domestic services began running in 2009, operated by Southeastern using Hitachi built Class 395 high speed trains.
