= Savigliano =

Savigliano Savijan (Piedmontese)
- Comune
- Città di Savigliano
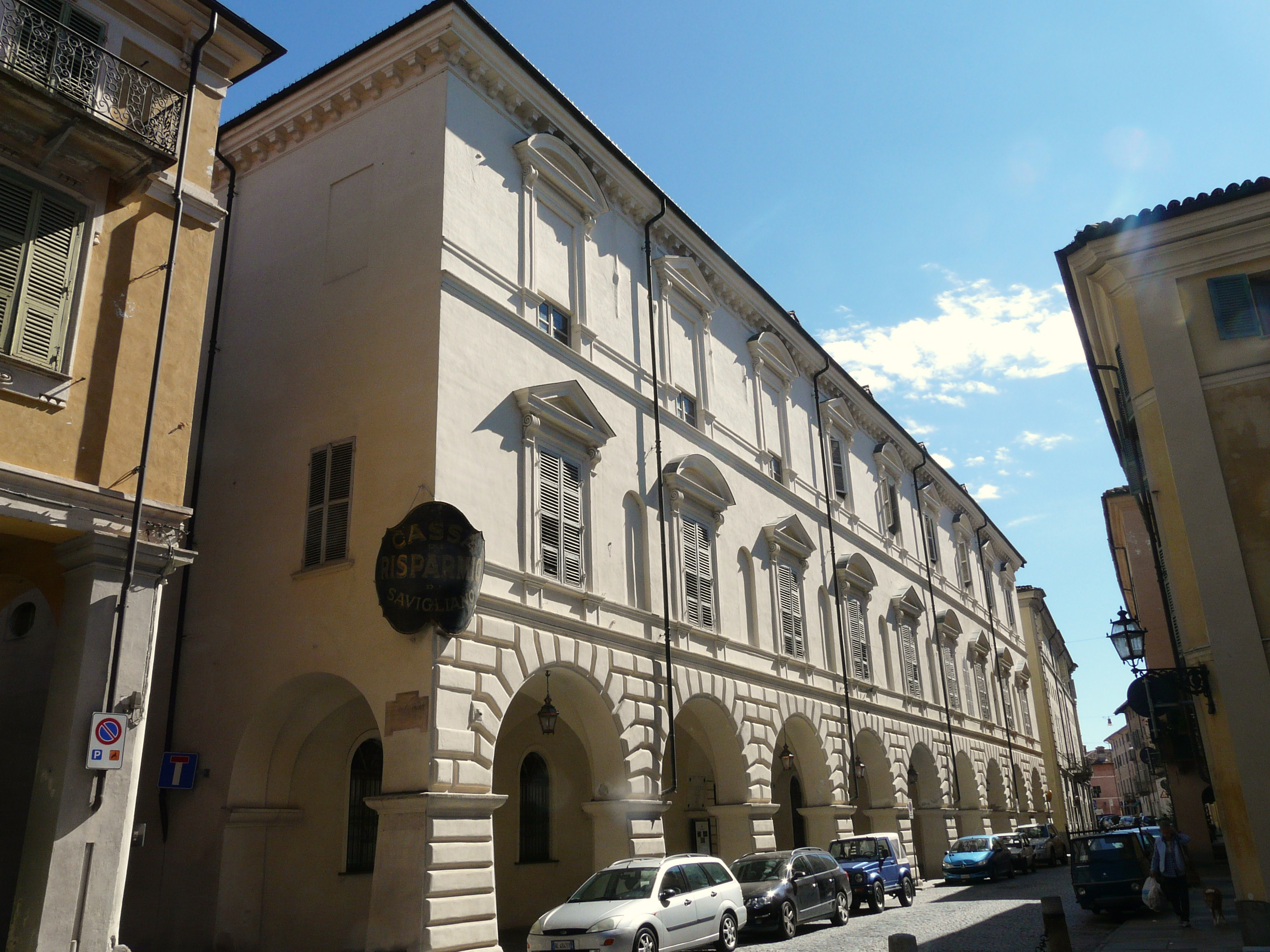
- Town centre

- Coat of arms

- Location within Italy Location within Piedmont
- Coordinates: 44°39′N 7°38′E
- Country: Italy
- Region: Piedmont
- Province: Cuneo (CN)
- Frazioni: Apparizione, Braida, Canavere Alte, Canavere Basse, Cascina Due Porte, Cavallotta, Ex Ferriera, Levaldigi, Martinetto-Consolata, Oropa, Palazzo, Rigrasso, San Salvatore, Sanità, Solere, Suniglia, Tetti Roccia, Tetti Vigna

Government
  - Mayor: Antonello Portera

Area
  - Total: 110.79 km^{2} (42.78 sq mi)
- Elevation: 321 m (1,053 ft)

Population (1 January 2021)
  - Total: 21,442
  - Density: 193.54/km^{2} (501.26/sq mi)
- Demonym: Saviglianese(i)
- Time zone: UTC+1 (CET)
  - Summer (DST): UTC+2 (CEST)
- Postal code: 12038
- Dialing code: 0172
- Patron saint: St. Sebastian
- Saint day: August 19
- Website: Official website

Savigliano (Italian: [saviʎˈʎaːno]; Piedmontese: Savijan [saviˈjɑŋ]; Occitan: Savilhan; French: Savillan) is a comune (municipality) in the Province of Cuneo, in the Northern Italian region of Piedmont, about 50 kilometres (31 mi) south of Turin by rail.

It is home to ironworks, foundries, locomotive works (once owned by Fiat Ferroviaria, now by Alstom) and silk manufactures, as well as sugar factories, printing works and cocoon-raising establishments.

== Main sights ==
Savigliano retains some traces of its ancient walls, demolished in 1707, and has a collegiate church (S. Andrea, in its present form comparatively modern), and a triumphal arch erected in honour of the marriage of Charles Emmanuel I to Infanta Catherine of Austrian Spain.

There is also a train museum exhibiting numerous Italian past trains and locomotives.

== Notable people ==
- Elena Busso, volleyball player
- Sara Curtis (born 2006), swimmer
- Santorre di Santarosa, an Italian Philhellene
- Luca Filippi, racing driver
- Giovanni Schiaparelli, astronomer

== Twin towns ==
- Pylos, Greece, since 1962
- Mormanno, Italy, since 1962
- Villa María, Argentina, since 2000
