= British Rail Classes 371, 381 and 471 =

Networker trains

British Rail Classes 371, 381 and 471 Networker
- Artist's impression of Class 371
- Family name: Networker
- Number built: Never Built
- Operators: British Rail (intended)
- Lines served: Intended - Thameslink; Kent Coast; LTS; Great Northern

Class 371, Class 381 and Class 471 were proposed electric multiple unit classes from the Networker family of trains intended to operate long distance services in the south-east of England. Due to British Rail's financial limitations in the early 1990s recession, and the break-up of NSE in the privatisation of British Rail from 1994, none of the trains were ordered.

== Class 371 and 381 ==
Classes 371 and 381 were intended as the so-called "Universal Networker", a dual voltage train capable of operating using both 25 kV AC from overhead wire and 750 V DC from third rail. It was planned that Class 371 would be used on the enhanced Thameslink 2000 services while Class 381 would be utilised on various long-distance routes across the Network SouthEast (NSE) sector, including Kent Coast services from Victoria and Charing Cross, Great Northern services from King's Cross and London, Tilbury and Southend (LTS) services from Fenchurch Street.

Due to British Rail's financial limitations in the early 1990s recession, and the break-up of NSE in the privatisation of British Rail from 1994, neither train was ordered.

== Class 471 ==
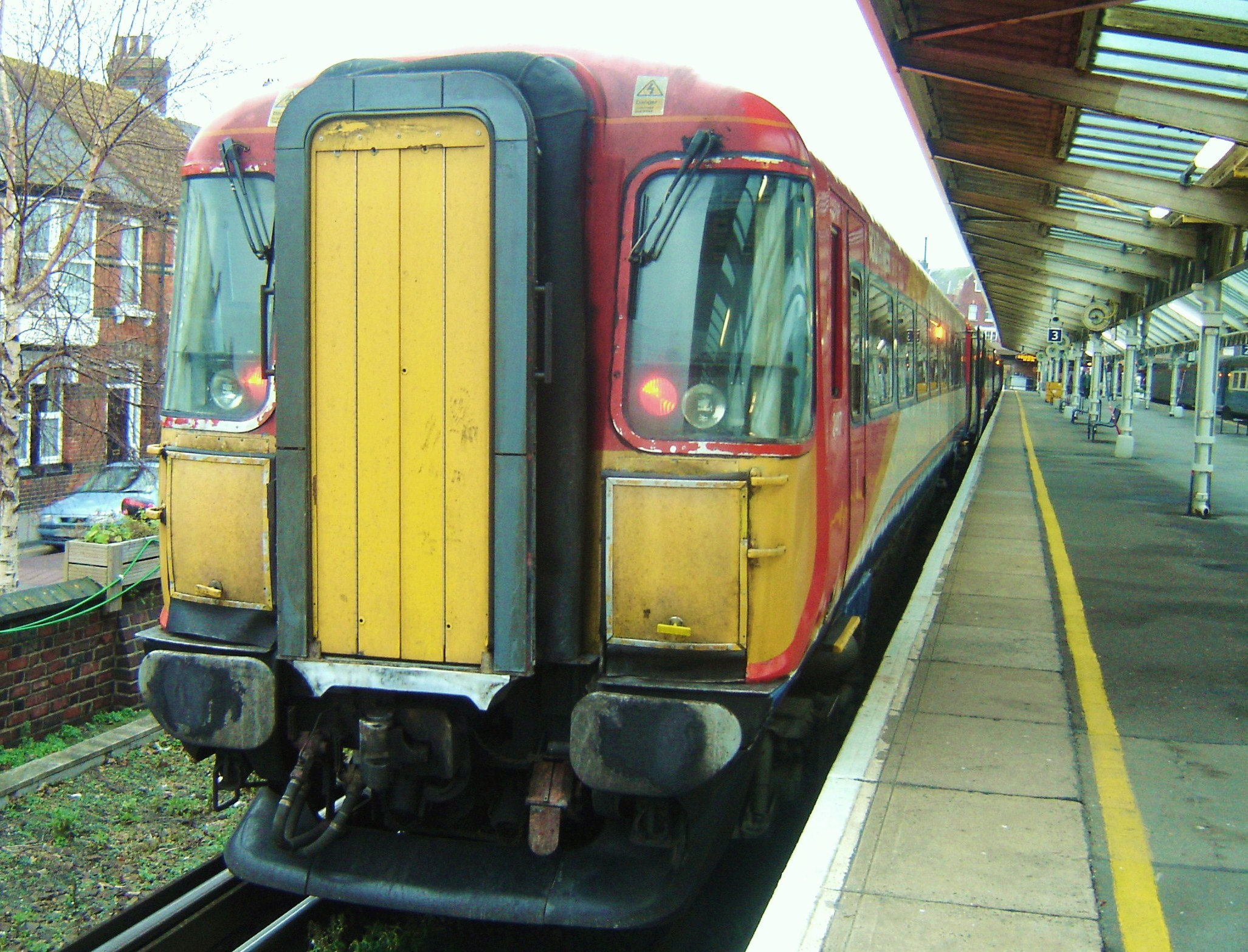
The Class 471 mock-up (top) showing its external resemblance to the Class 442 (bottom)

Class 471 was the proposed "Main Line Networker" intended for long-distance Network SouthEast services from London to Kent and Sussex.

Intended as four car units, the Class 471 was to have featured an end gangway to allow passage between two connected units, with seating in 2+2 and 2+3 arrangements. First class seating was to be in side corridor compartments, but the seats (3 across with small table/bin between them) were to be no wider than standard class. The publicity sheet promised air conditioning, trolley catering, telephone area, carpeting throughout, customer operated power doors, individual reading lights in first class, high-backed seats for comfort, public address system and dot matrix on board information system. A mock-up was unveiled in August 1991, bearing a resemblance to the Class 442 "Wessex Express" units operating to the South-West, but with sliding doors. Entry into service was due by 1993.

However, due to British Rail's financial limitations in the early 1990s recession, and the break-up of NSE in the privatisation of British Rail from 1994, the train wasn't ordered.

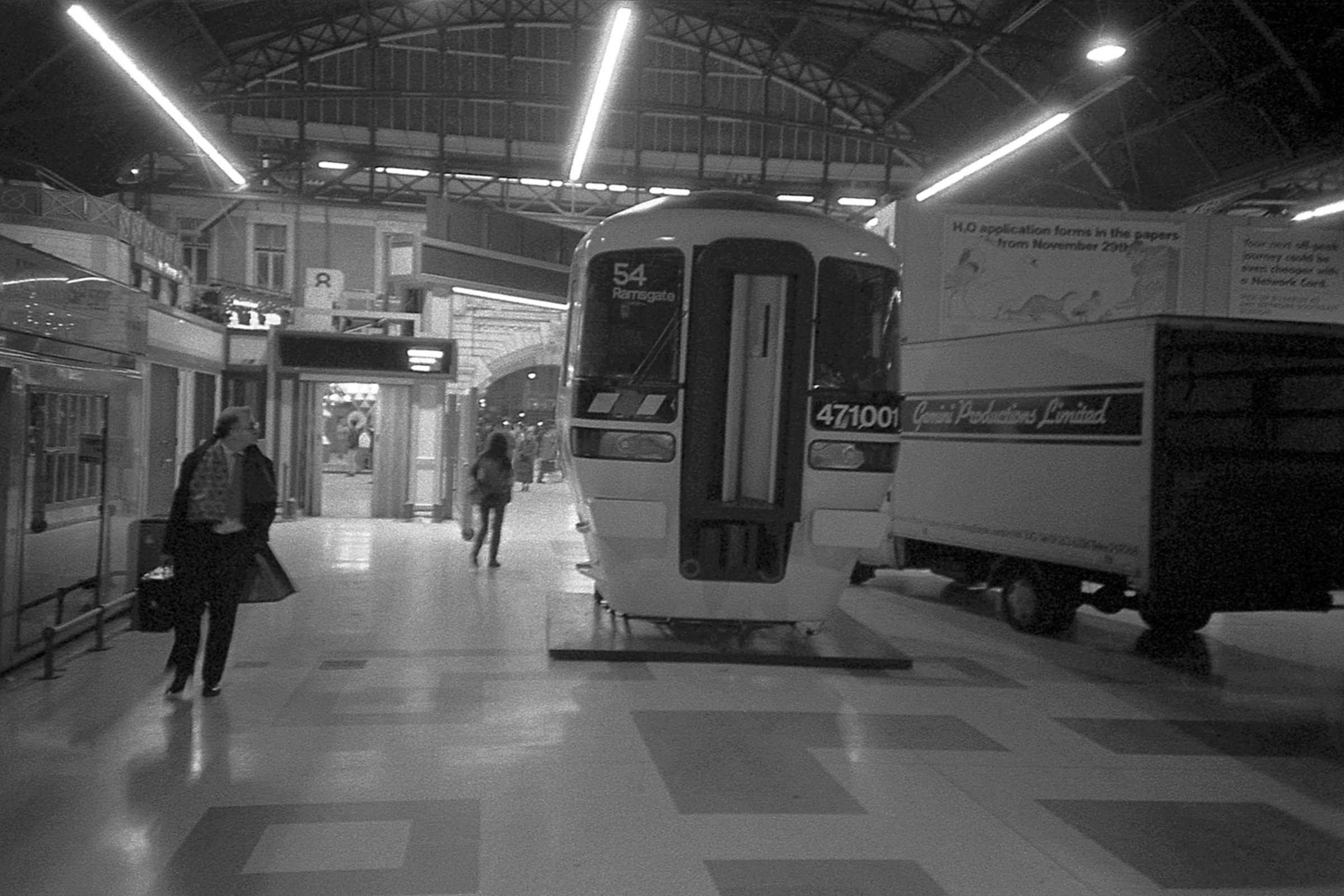
Front end mock up at London Victoria Station

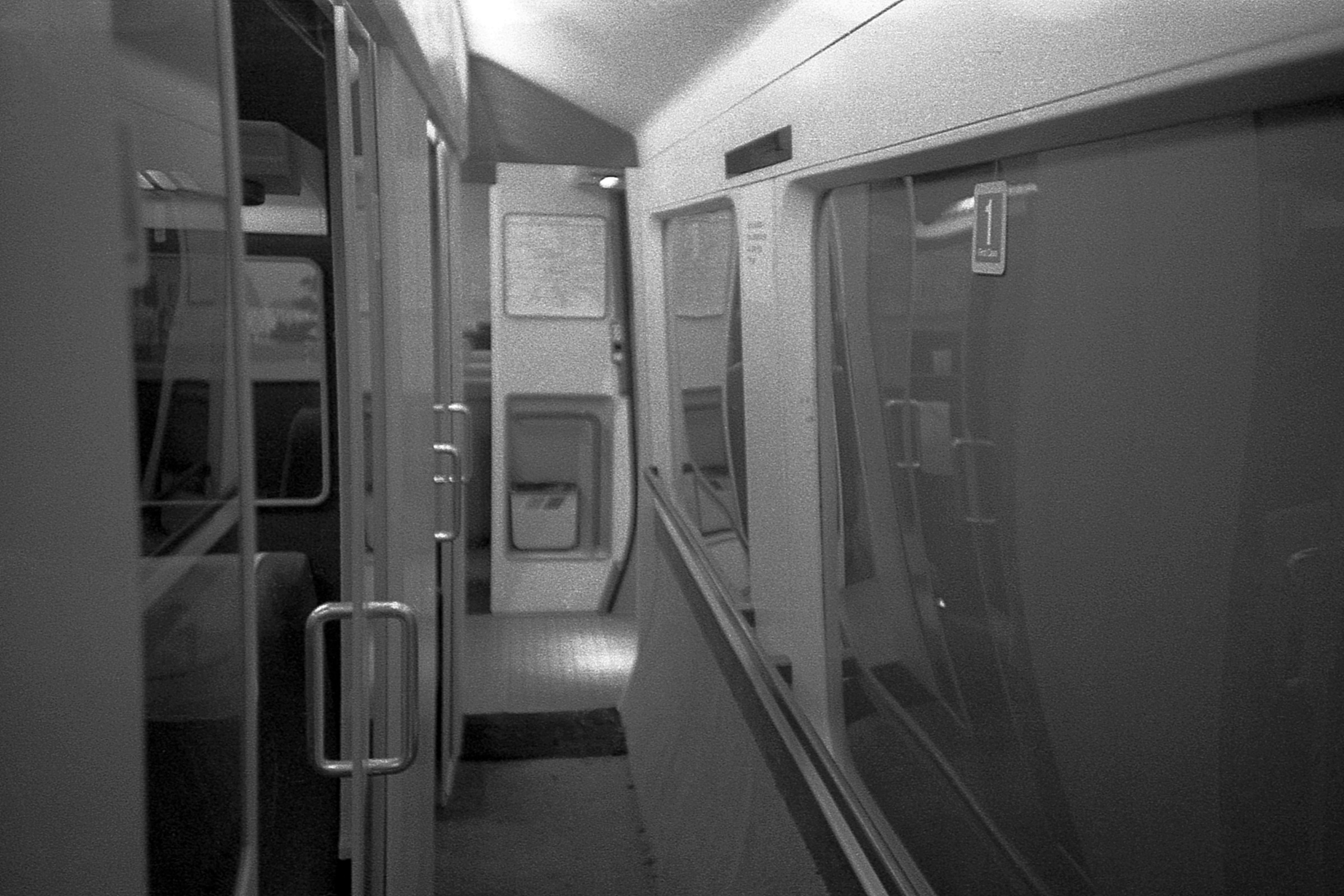
Corridor of First Class section of mock up

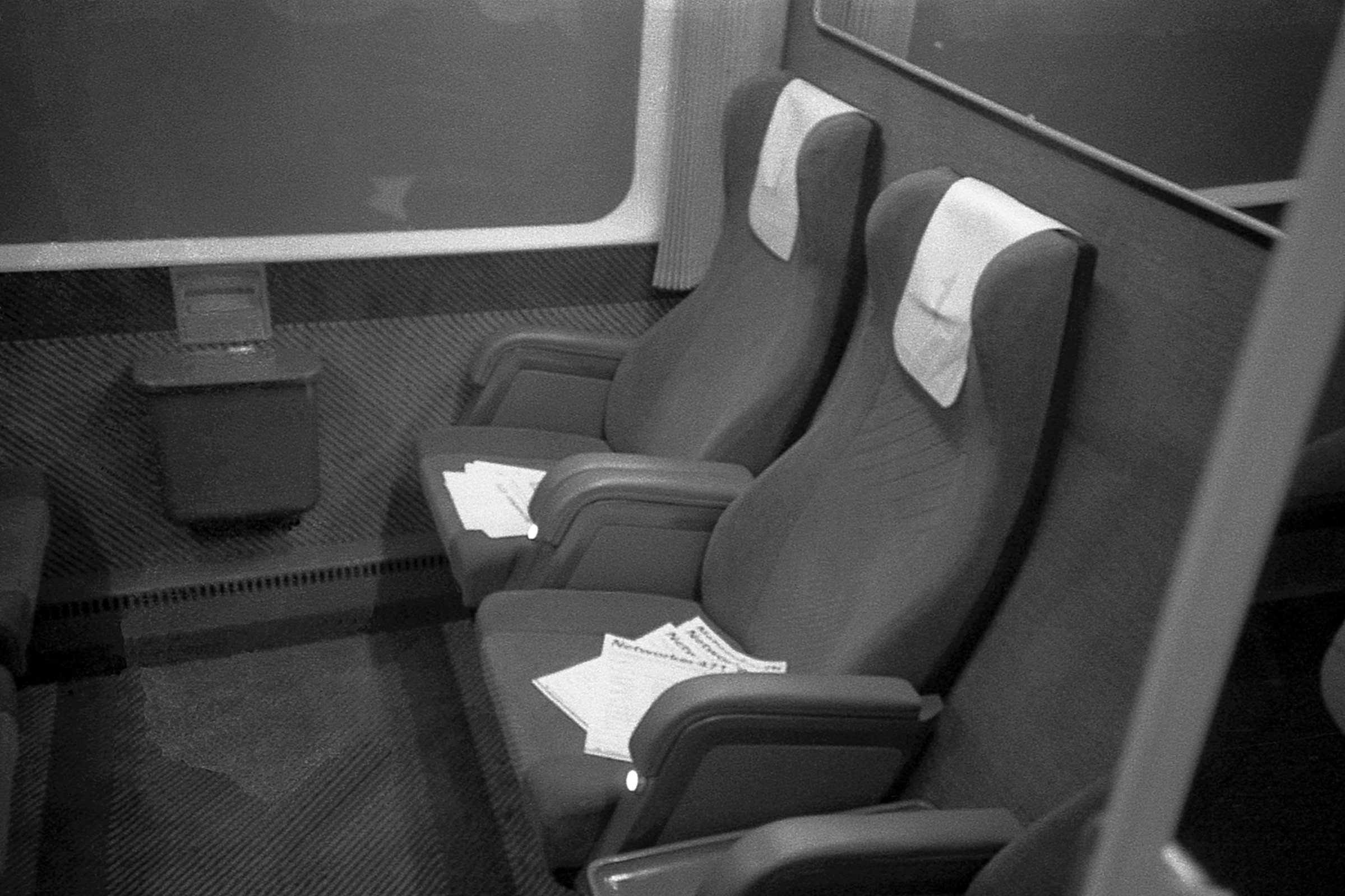
Interior of First Class compartment of mock up

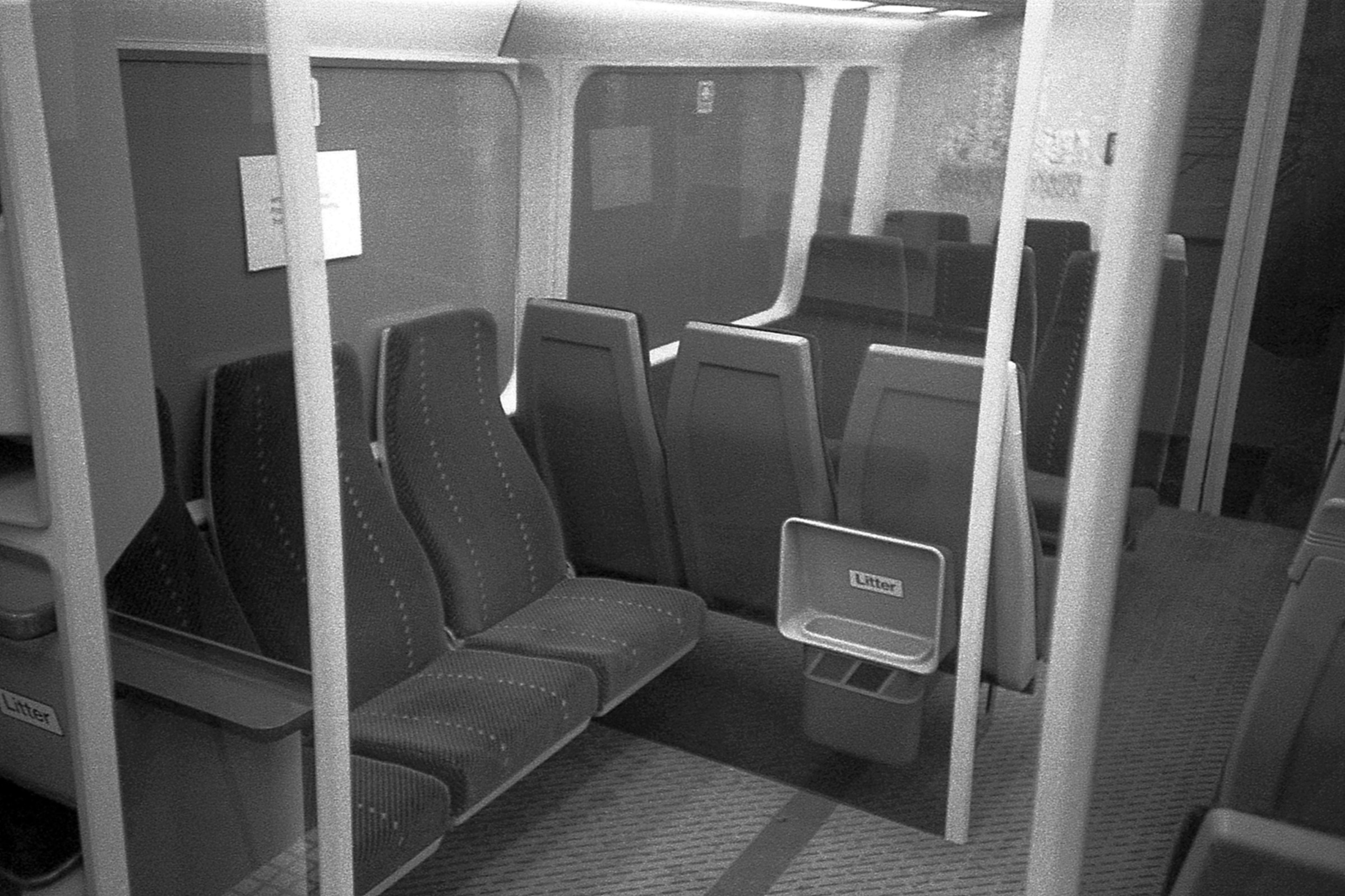
Interior of Standard Class of mock up

== Alternative ==
The cancellation of the Class 371, 381 and 471 led to an alternative proposal. This involved the construction of a new batch of dual voltage units, classed as Class 365 using the existing Class 465 bodyshell, at the same time converting them for long-distance usage. A total of 41 units were built, with 25 for the Great Northern routes from Kings Cross and 16 for Kent Coast routes.

The Class 319 were the primary dual voltage commuter unit operating over the Thameslink route for nearly 30 years, but have been replaced by Class 700, part of the Siemens Desiro City family. Meanwhile, the Electrostar series is utilised over several long-distance routes in the South-East. Both the Class 375 and Class 377 Electrostars have dual voltage sub-classes, as does the Class 387 that were temporarily operated by Thameslink while Class 700s were being delivered. The Class 365 fleet was used on the Great Northern routes, however was scrapped in the early 2020s. The Class 357 is used on LTS services.
