= Waterloo and City Railway electric units =

British electric rolling stock

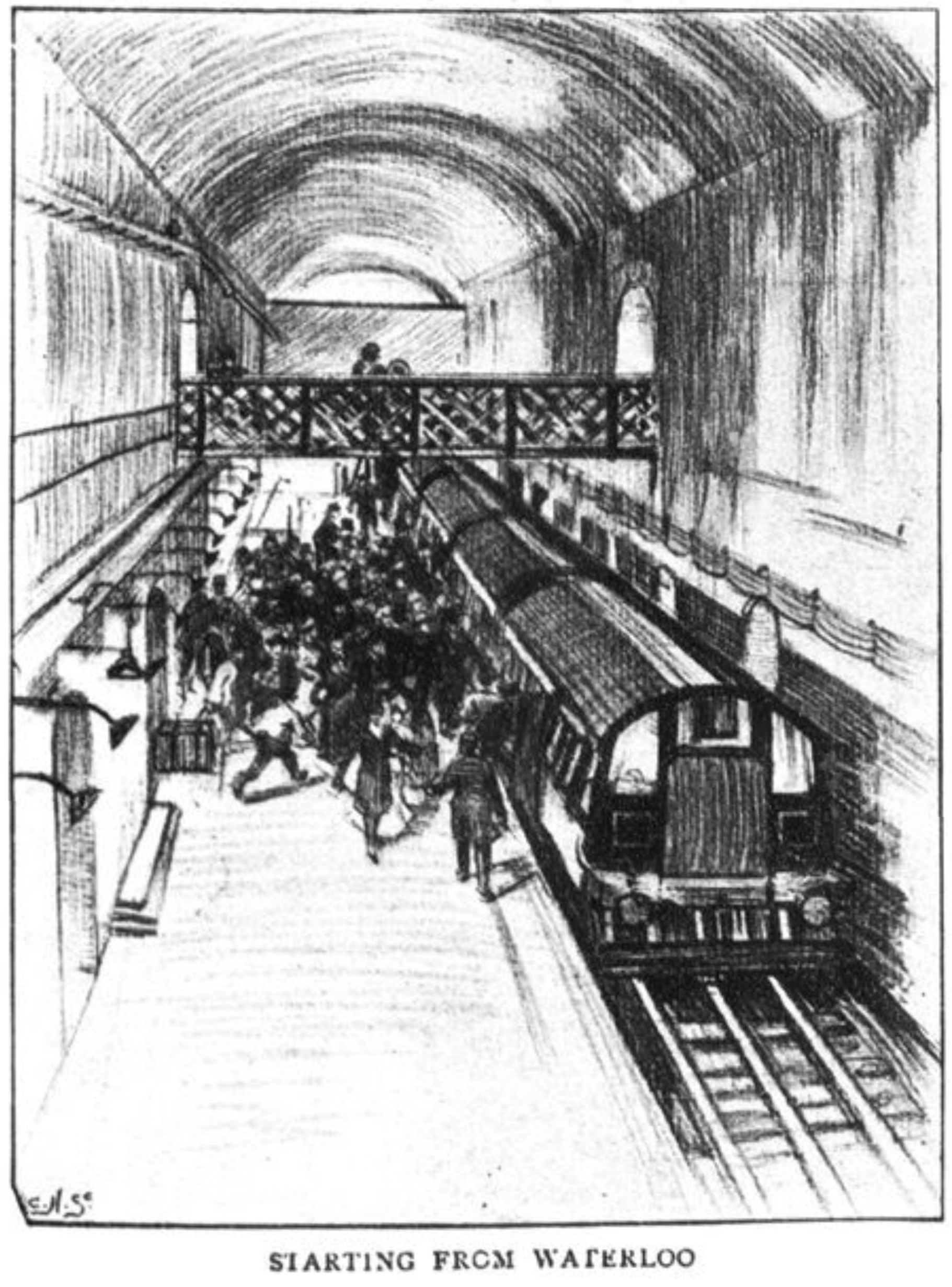
- Illustration of W&CR train at Waterloo in 1898
- In service: 1898–1940
- Manufacturer: Jackson and Sharp Company
- Built at: Eastleigh Works (assembly from kits)
- Family name: Tube stock
- Constructed: 1897-1898; 1899; 1921
- Scrapped: 1940
- Number built: 31 vehicles (16 Driving Motor, 15 Trailer)
- Number scrapped: 31 vehicles
- Successor: Class 487
- Formation: 4/5-car (DM-T-T-DM/DM-T-T-T-DM) (Peak); 1-car (DM) (Off-Peak)
- Capacity: DM 46 seats T 56 seats
- Operators: Waterloo and City Railway; LSWR; Southern Railway
- Depots: Waterloo (Waterloo & City line)
- Line served: Waterloo & City line

Specifications
- Car length: 47 ft 1 in (14.35 m) (DM); 46 ft 3 1/2 in (14.11 m) (T)
- Width: 8 ft 6 in (2.59 m)
- Height: 9 ft 8 in (2.95 m)
- Traction system: Two Siemens 60 hp (45 kW) traction motors per DM
- Power output: DM: 120 hp (89 kW)
- Electric system: 530-600 V DC
- Current collection: Third rail
- Track gauge: 1,435 mm (4 ft 8 1/2 in)

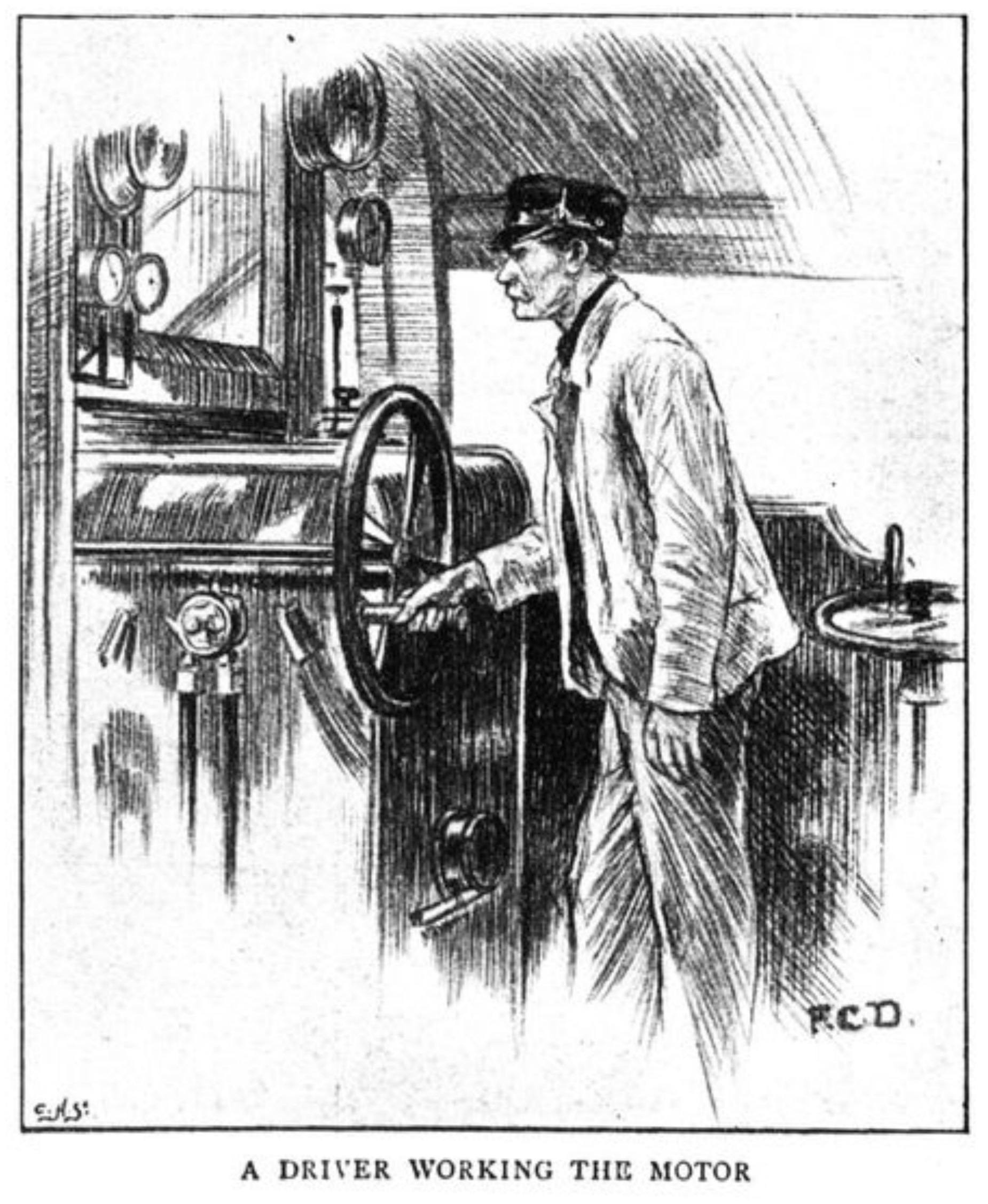
Illustration of a driver working the motor of the electric multiple unit

The Waterloo and City Railway began operating services on 11 July 1898 with newly built 4-car electric multiple units, each consisting of two driving motor vehicles sandwiching a pair of unpowered trailer vehicles, the first EMU design to be used in a deep-level tube railway.

== Background ==
The Waterloo and City Railway was built as a means of connecting the main London terminus of the London and South Western Railway (LSWR) at Waterloo with the City of London. Owing to restrictions placed on the construction of main-line railways through the centre of London, it was necessary to build this as an underground railway. Despite attempts to have the new link constructed to accommodate main-line trains, the decision was taken to build a deep-level tube railway using the tunnelling shield method perfected by James Henry Greathead. The depth of the tunnels meant that electric traction would be required for the trains that would run on the new route.

== Trains ==
Following a tendering process, the contract to build the trains for the W&CR was awarded to the Jackson and Sharp Company of Wilmington, Delaware in the United States. Rather than constructing the vehicles that would form the trains themselves, the manufacturer constructed the components, which were then shipped to the LSWR's Eastleigh Works in kit form. There, the new trains would be assembled for use. The first complete unit was delivered to Waterloo in March 1898. However, the line itself had no direct connection to the rest of the railway network; the only way for trains to access the tunnels was via a hydraulic lift, which was only completed in April 1898. The first successful test run along the line was undertaken on 4 June 1898, and the line was formally opened on 11 July, with the public service starting on 8 August 1898.

As constructed, the trains were formed as 4-car units. A total of 22 vehicles were initially built under the order with Jackson and Sharp, consisting of 11 Driving Motor vehicles and 11 Trailer vehicles, allowing for a total of four 4-car trains plus a number of spare vehicles. Unlike the City & South London Railway, which was London's only other deep-tube railway at the time, and which used electric locomotives and hauled coaches, these trains were electric multiple units, with the traction equipment and driving position located on the passenger carrying vehicles. Each Driving Motor vehicle was fitted with a 60 hp series-wound gearless motor per axle, with the current collected via third rail at 530 V DC. The trains were fitted with Westinghouse compressed air brakes, although they did not have their own compressors; instead the air reservoirs had to be recharged using static compressors at Waterloo, which was done once the air pressure fell to 70 psi (480 kPa). The crew for each train numbered six; the driver, a driver's assistant, a guard and three gatemen. These final crewmen manned the gated entrances that were located at the end of each car. There were no side doors, and the interiors were built in an open saloon rather than compartmented style.

== Later years ==
Following the opening of the line, it was rapidly found that the service in the peak periods was operating at capacity, while the route was fairly quiet for the remainder of the day. As a consequence, it was decided to reduce the service level during the quieter periods, and an order was placed with Dick, Kerr & Co. for five additional Driving Motor vehicles in early 1899. These new vehicles would be used singly during the day, with the original 4-car trains used during the peak morning and evening periods. The new cars were fitted with half-width driving cabs at each end, and 75 hp (56 kW) traction motors.

The LSWR absorbed the Waterloo and City Railway fully in 1906, and in 1915 began to electrify its suburban routes into Waterloo. As part of this, it built a new power station at Wimbledon, which took over the responsibility for providing electricity to the Waterloo & City from the original generating station built with the line. This raised the traction voltage of the line to 600 V DC.

In 1921, the LSWR elected to extend the length of its peak period trains, and an additional four Trailer vehicles were built at Eastleigh Works to the original specification, allowing peak period services to be lengthened to 5-cars.

== Replacement ==
In 1937, the Southern Railway (formed in 1923 as one of the "Big Four", and which was now responsible for the Waterloo & City) undertook a review of the line, which was coming up to 40 years of operation. One of the recommendations from this was the procurement of new rolling stock to replace the original trains, and an order was placed with English Electric for 12 new Driving Motor vehicles and 16 new Trailers, to be built by Dick, Kerr & Co. These new units were delivered during 1940, with work to upgrade the line being undertaken at the same time. Following the end of service on 25 October 1940, the original units were removed from the line to the surface, to be replaced by the new English Electric stock.
