= Chart Leacon TMD =

Disused railway maintenance depot in Kent, England

Chart Leacon Train and Rolling Stock Maintenance Depot
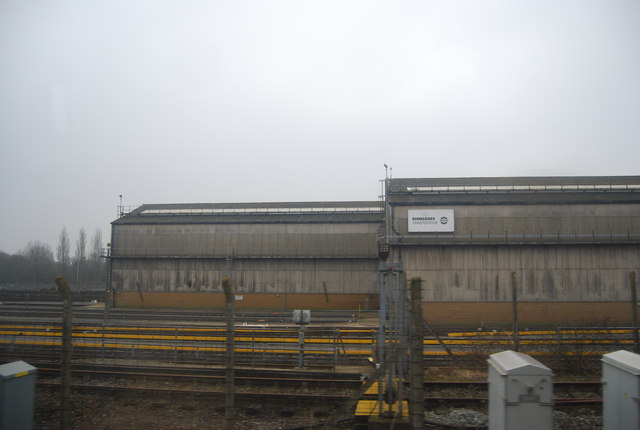
- Ashford Rail Depot
- Interactive map of Chart Leacon Train and Rolling Stock Maintenance Depot

Location
- Location: Ashford, Kent
- Coordinates: 51.1478°N 0.8495°E
- OS grid: TQ994425

Characteristics
- Owner: Bombardier Transportation
- Depot code: AF (1973 -)
- Type: EMU

History
- Opened: 1847
- Closed: March 2014
- Former depot code: 73F

Chart Leacon Traction and Rolling Stock Maintenance Depot was at one time a railway depot located in Ashford, Kent, England. The depot was situated 1.5 mi (2.4 km) to the west of Ashford International station on the south side of the line to Pluckley railway station.

The depot code is AF.

== History ==
In 1987, the depot had an allocation of Class 09 shunters, and was used for stabling DEMUs and EMUs. Chart Leacon is now closed with its successor "Ramsgate EMU Depot" acquiring all class 375 stock.

== Allocation ==
In 2014, the depot's allocation consisted of Southeastern Class 375/3/6 EMUs.

== Reopening plans ==
On 5 January 2019, Network Rail proposed plans to restore the sidings and stable Southeastern trains which will be displaced due to new Thameslink services using the existing Hitachi depot. The landowner appealed against Ashford Council's approval of this project, but the High Court ruled in favour of the Council.

The depot sheds were demolished in 2020. Compulsory purchase powers for the land were awarded to Network Rail in 2021.. The sidings were not built.

In 2026, Gemini Trains expressed interest in using the unbuilt site for servicing international trains.

== Bibliography ==
- Marsden, Colin J. (1987). BR Depots. Motive power recognition. Vol. 6. Ian Allan Ltd. ISBN 9780711017191. OCLC 18685680.
- Webster, Neil; Greengrass, Robert; Greaves, Simon (1987). British Rail Depot Directory. Metro Enterprises Ltd. ISBN 9780947773076. OCLC 20420397.
