= Johann Büssow =

German historian

Johann Büssow (born 1973) is a historian of the modern Middle East. He is professor of Middle Eastern Studies at the Ruhr University Bochum.

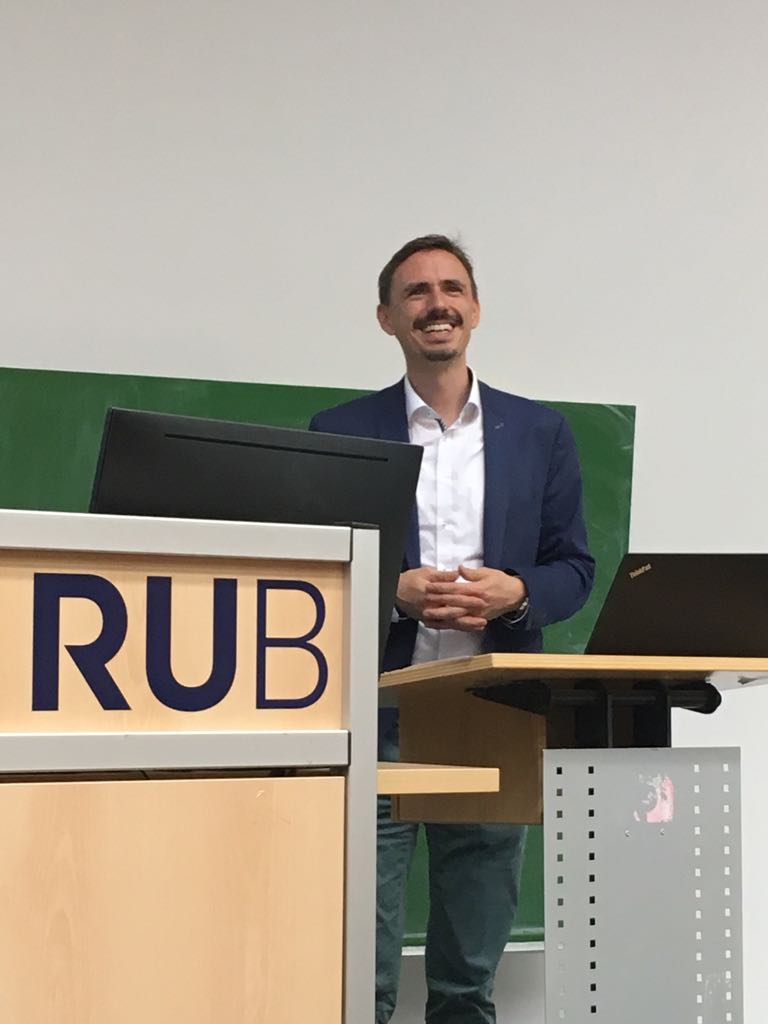
Johann Büssow (2018)

== Academic career ==
Johann Büssow studied political science, Islamic studies and Jewish studies. He has taught five years at Free University of Berlin, where he also obtained a PhD in Middle Eastern Studies in 2008. Later he has worked as a research associate at the German Orient-Institut in Beirut, Lebanon and at the Research Centre ‘Difference and Integration’ (SFB 586) at the University of Halle-Wittenberg, Germany. From 2013 to 2018 he had been professor of Islamic History and Culture at the University of Tübingen and afterwards moved to Ruhr University Bochum, where he accepted the position of professor of “Oriental Studies (Arabic and Islamic Studies)”.

Johann Büssow is section editor for the history of the Arab world from 1500 to the present of the Encyclopaedia of Islam Three (Brill, Leiden) and co-editor of the book series 'Studien zur Geschichte und Zeitgeschichte Westasiens und Nordafrikas' (LIT Verlag, Berlin u.a.).

== Current projects ==
Johann Büssow's research focuses on the social and political history of the modern Middle East and intellectual history in the modern Islamic world since the eighteenth century.

Together with a team of historians around Yuval Ben-Bassat (Haifa) and Khaled Safi (Gaza) he is currently working on Gaza and its region during the late Ottoman period. In 2022, he was awarded a Consolidator Grant from the European Research Council to investigate social and cultural dynamics in the Palestinian region between 1880 and 1920 as part of the LOOP (Late Ottoman Palestinians) research project. The findings are being published on an academic blog on an ongoing basis. With the historian Stefan Rohdewald (Gießen) he co-directs a research project on Palestine as a region of migration during the transition from late Ottoman to British Mandatory rule, in the framework of the research cluster "Transottomanica". With Astrid Meier (Beirut), he is preparing a book-length study with the tentative title "Bedouin Syria: The Arid Lands of the Middle East, 1516–2011". Together with several colleagues from Tübingen, he is conducting an interdisciplinary research project on the history of oasis towns in Oman.

Together with Roman Seidel, he is working on the project Path and Guidance: The Development of Quranic Metaphors of Space and Movement in Tafsīr Literature to study metaphors in Quranic exegesis (tafsīr).

== Published books ==
- Büssow, Johann (2011). Hamidian Palestine: Politics and Society in the District of Jerusalem, 1872-1908. Leiden: Brill, ISBN 978-90-04-20569-7.
- — (2012). Geschichtsort Jaffator: Osmanische Kommunalverwaltung und bürgerschaftliches Engagement in Jerusalem, 1867-1917. Berlin: Aphorisma, ISBN 978-3-86575-540-7.
- — with Khaled Safi (2013). Damascus Affairs: Egyptian Rule in Syria through the Eyes of an Anonymous Damascene Chronicler, 1831-1840. Würzburg: Ergon, ISBN 978-3-89913-906-8.
- — Al-Sūr al-Muḥīṭ (2023): the city wall of Bahla as a case study for the organisation of communal tasks in central Oman on the eve of modern state administration, 1967–1977 (with M. Hoffmann-Ruf, und N. Al-Saqri) EB-Verlag, Berlin, ISBN 978-3-86893-439-7.
- — Late Ottoman Gaza (2024): An Eastern Mediterranean hub in transformation (with Y. Ben-Bassat) Cambridge University Press, Cambridge, ISBN 978-1-108-99951-9.
