= Busson (surname) =

Busson is a surname. Notable people with the surname include:

- Arpad Busson (born 1963), French financier
- Bev Busson (born 1951), Canadian senator
- Jack Busson (1910–1989), English golfer
- Laura Busson (born 1978), British executive

== See also ==
- Busson, a commune in France
