= Train reporting number =

British train identifier

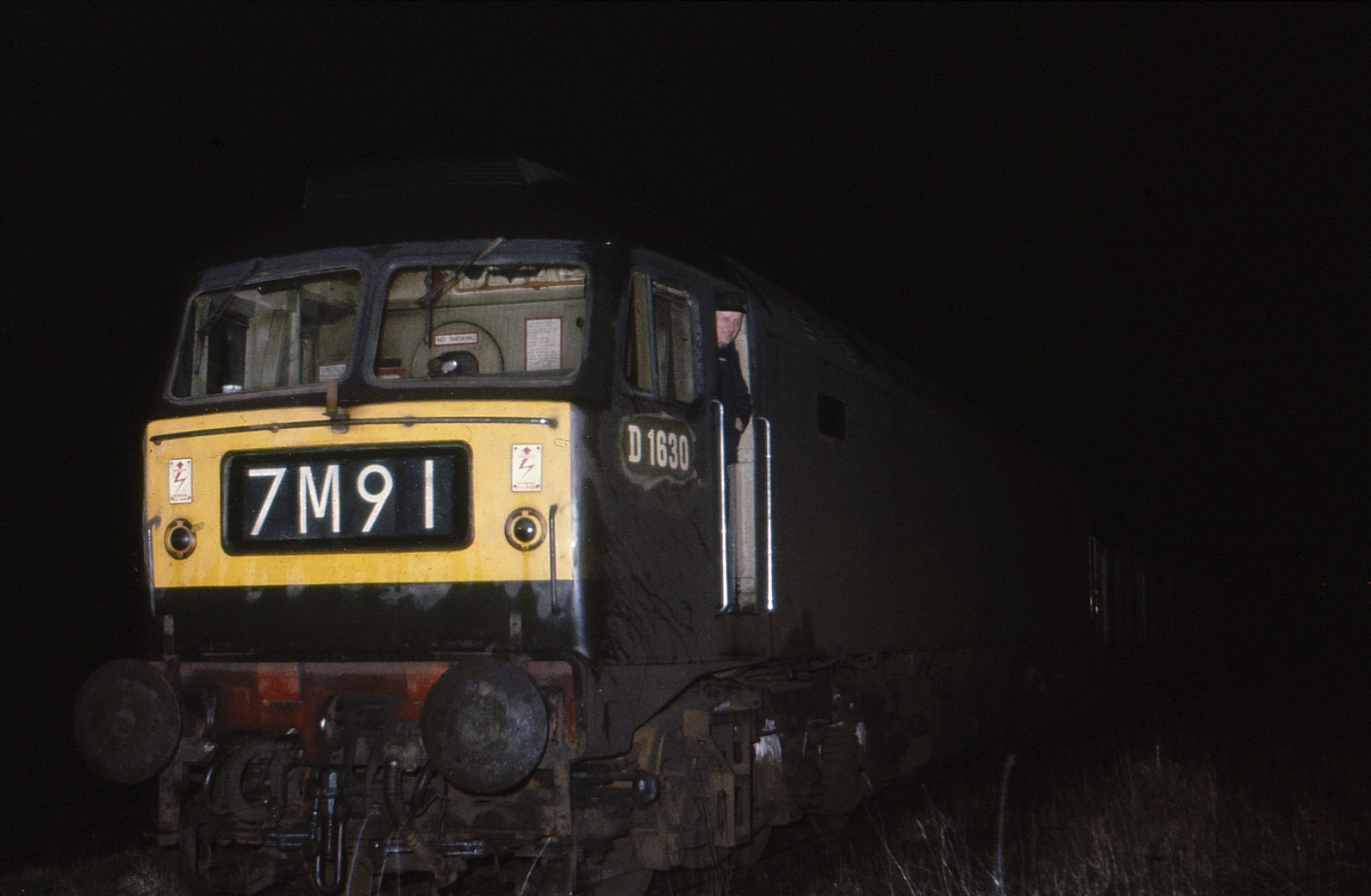
Class 47 displaying train reporting number 7M91 in June 1974

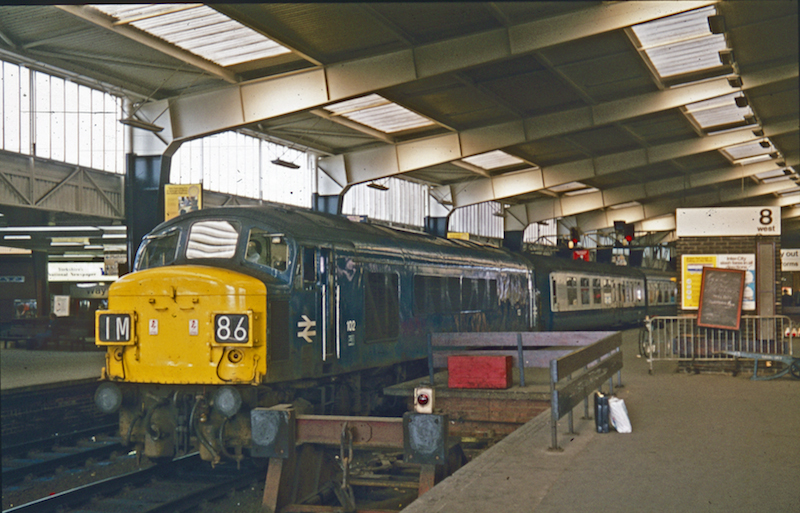
Class 45 showing train reporting number 1M86 departing Leeds station in 1974

A train reporting number in Great Britain identifies a particular train service. It consists of:

- A single-digit number, indicating the class (type) of train, followed by
- A letter, indicating the destination area, followed by
- A two-digit number, identifying the individual train or indicating the route (the latter generally for suburban services).

The train reporting number is often called the headcode, a throwback to when the number was physically displayed at the head of a train.

== History ==
=== Headcodes ===
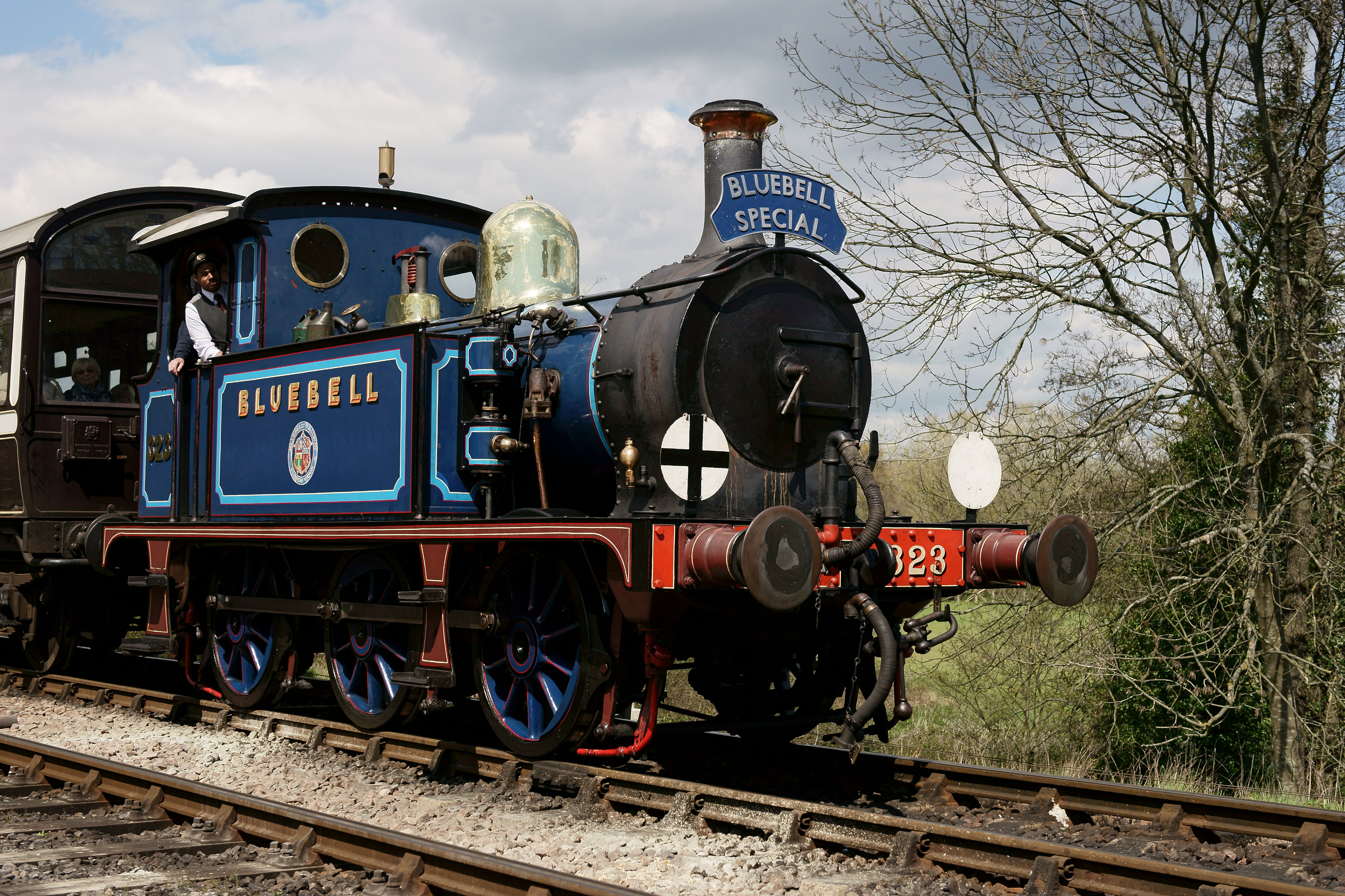
Headcode discs on Bluebell Railway SECR P class Bluebell 323

Headcodes were introduced circa 1850 and were shown by oil lamps facing forward on the front of the locomotive. The position of these lamps on the locomotive denoted the class of train, which assisted the signalmen to determine the gaps between trains required in the interval-based signalling system that was used at the time. The lamps were lit at night and were usually painted white to assist with sighting by day. On some lines white discs were used by day in the place of lamps.

With the advent of absolute block signalling, the class-based headcodes allowed signallers to identify and regulate trains properly. On some busy lines, particularly busy suburban ones, the headcode denoted the route of the train rather than the class of train. In these areas junctions were complex and timetables were intense: it was more important that signallers routed the trains correctly than regulated trains by class. This was prevalent in the south of England, where companies used six headlamp positions to show the route of train.

Some companies had their own code format which led to some confusion where trains from one company ran onto other companies' lines. The Railway Clearing House intervened to standardise headcodes, based on four lamp positions, and they were adopted by the majority of lines outside the south of England. At the time of the 1923 Grouping, the standard headcodes were simplified so that normally only two lamps were used at any one time, and these codes were adopted by the London Midland and Scottish Railway, the Great Western Railway (GWR) and the London and North Eastern Railway. The Southern Railway (SR) retained a route-based headcode system, with up to four lamps in six positions. Notable exceptions were former Glasgow and South Western Railway and the Somerset and Dorset Joint Railway lines, which continued with their own headcodes on internal trains. The Caledonian Railway maintained a completely different route-based headcode system consisting of a pair of semaphore arms mounted on the locomotive – the angle of the two arms and their position (on the buffer beam or smokebox) indicated the routing.

=== Train reporting numbers ===
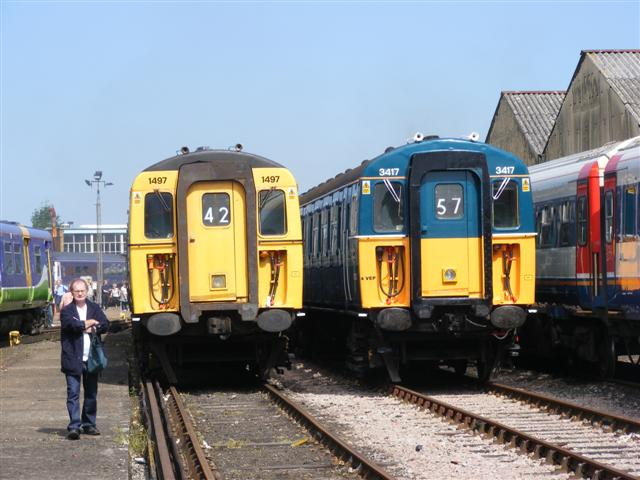
Southern Region electric multiple units showed two-character headcodes, where the code denoted the route of the train

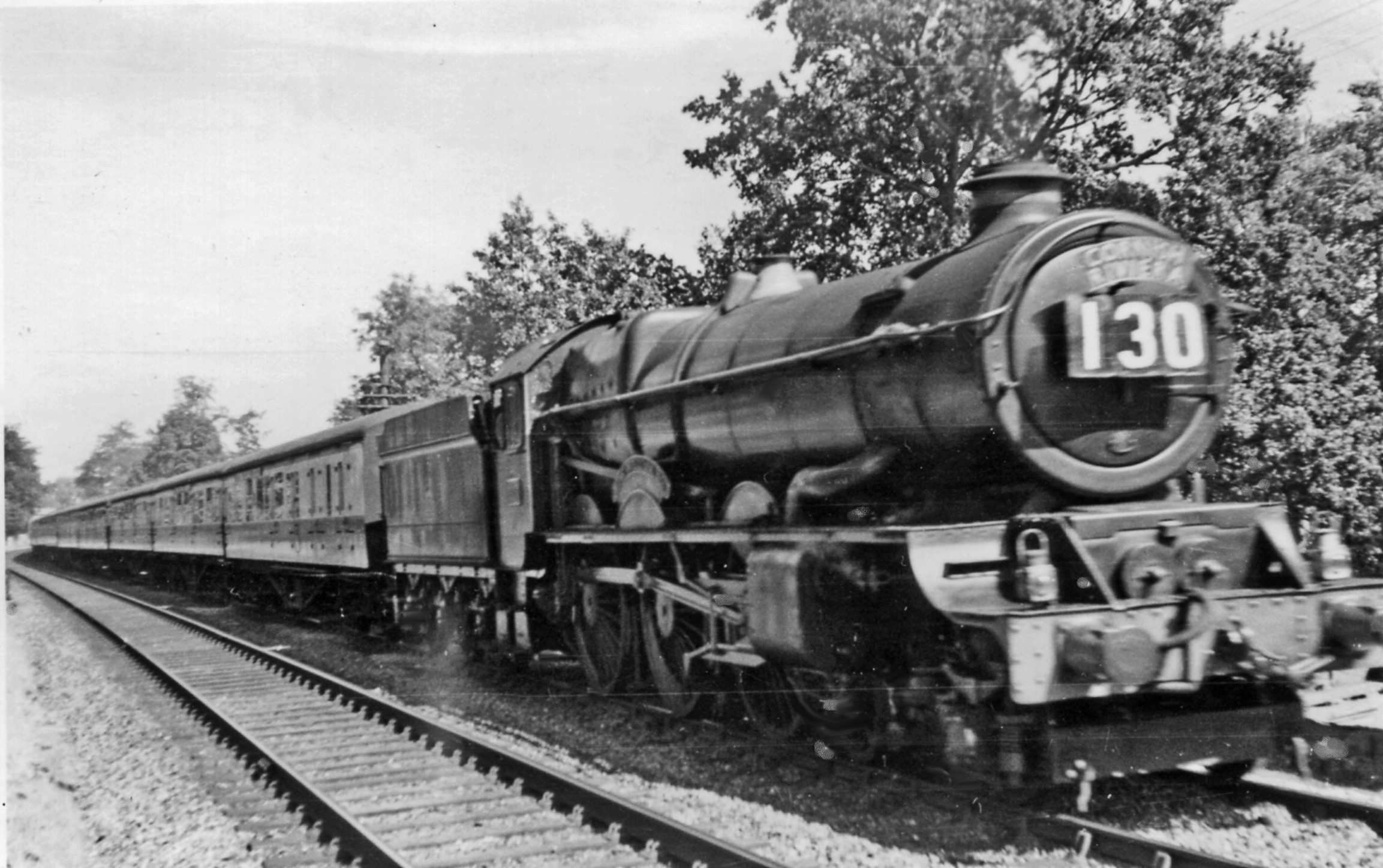
Great Western Railway Cornish Riviera Express with three digit number on the locomotive smokebox

Historically train reporting numbers were used to denote trains in the internal working timetable. These contained one or more letters or numbers to either uniquely identify a particular train, or denote its route (particularly on busier lines). Not all lines used these and the details and extent of the practice varied widely between companies. Although these numbers were in many places confined to timetables and other documentation, in some busier areas they were actually shown at the head of the train.

On the SR, a single alphabetic character system of denoting routes used on suburban lines grew into a two-character route-based system. This was developed at the same time as a significant programme of electrification and the consequent introduction of a large number of multiple unit trains. Many of these trains were fitted with display devices to show the route code instead of a lamp or disc-based headcode. Originally this was a back-lit stencil with the single letter code, later a two-character roller-blind system was used. The code system had equivalence with the lamp or disc route-based headcodes in assisting signallers with routing trains.

On the other railways, the reporting number was on occasion displayed at the head of the train along with the lamp headcode. This happened more often than not with special trains or other unusual trains (e.g. summer Saturday timetables), to allow signallers to identify unfamiliar trains and route them correctly. This code was sometimes either chalked onto the locomotive front or pasted as paper characters onto a headcode disc. The GWR sometimes used a three-character frame mounted on the locomotive smokebox in which the train reporting number could be displayed.

After nationalisation, British Railways continued with these headcodes and the new diesel and electric locomotives and multiple units were built either with a disc/lamp system (now powered by electricity) or a two to four character roller-blind display system depending on what part of the network they were to work.

=== 1960 headcode/reporting number merger ===
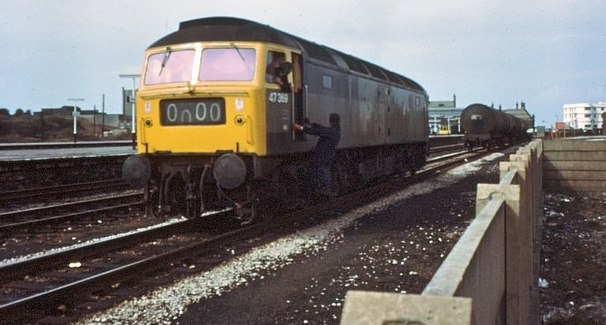
A Class 47 locomotive displaying headcode 0000 in 1976

In 1960, the current format was introduced where train class, route and reporting number information are combined in four characters. All diesel and electric locomotives and multiple units built after that date were fitted with a roller-blind display that could display the full reporting number, except locomotives and multiple units destined for the Southern Region, which continued its long-standing practice of two-character alpha-numeric displays.

By 1976, the replacement of the huge number of manual signal boxes with centralised power-signalling coupled with computer-based train control and more modern telecommunications systems meant that it was no longer necessary to display headcodes throughout the railway network. Outside the Southern Region blinds were set to 00 or 0000, and discs/lamps to the former express passenger code. Roller blinds were later blanked or plated over to show two dots and new trains introduced for service outside the Southern Region after this time usually had no train reporting number display equipment. Many trains intended to run over Southern Region lines were designed to display the numeric route-code portion of the train reporting number, which they still display, usually as a dot-matrix display.

== Components ==
The main purpose of the headcode is to assist the signaller in routing and regulating the train correctly, and it is especially useful if services are disrupted. After the introduction of the four-character codes, originally it was intended for signallers to visually note the train by the number displayed on its front; with the coming of automated systems the number has been retained internally within timetables and signalling systems but with some exceptions detailed above is no longer displayed on trains. Technically, every train has an 8 digit code which is unique to it, but this is often shortened to the 4 digit codes shown below.

=== Train classes ===
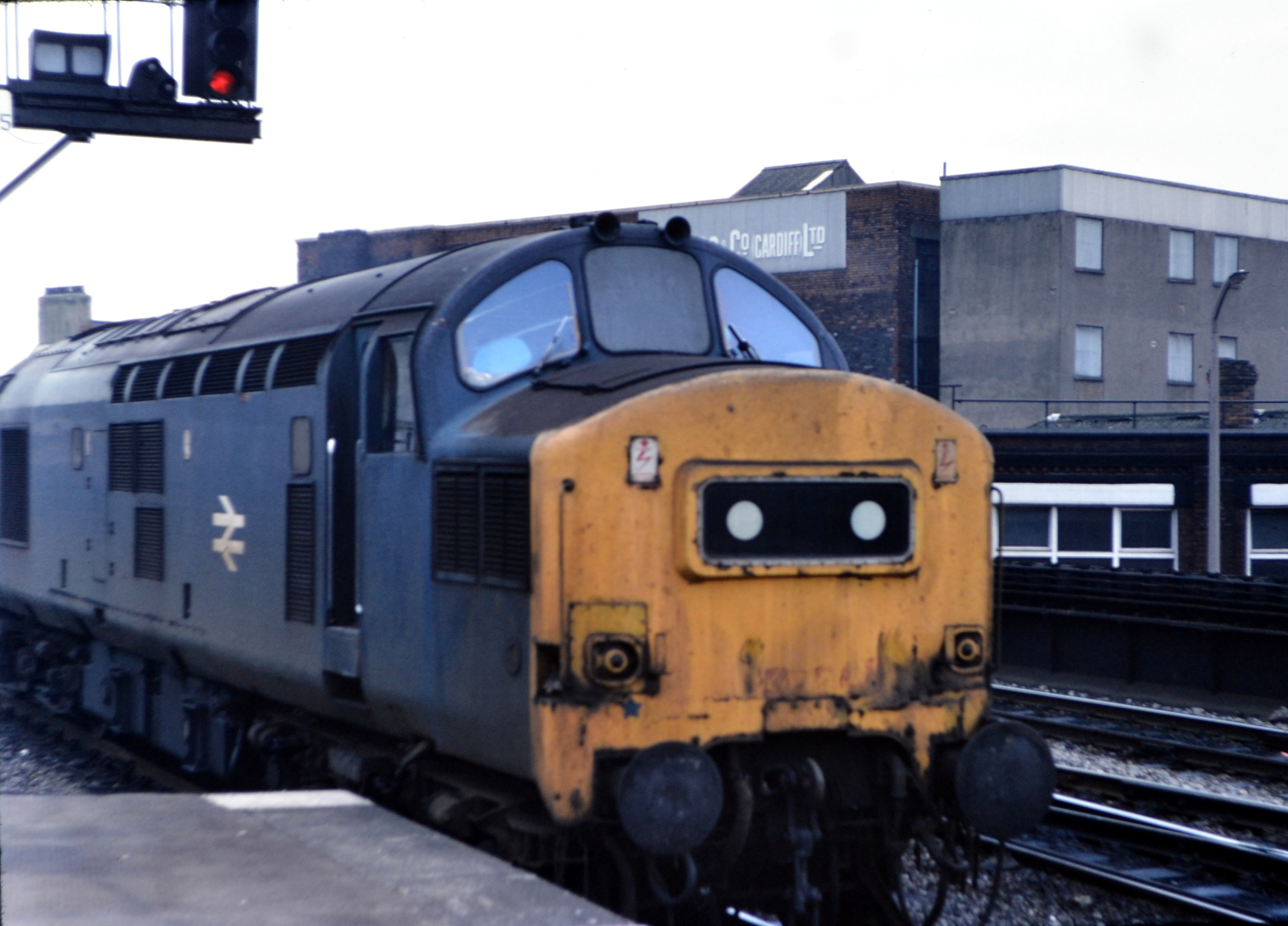
Class 37 locomotive with its headcode panel converted to two marker lights

For operational reasons, certain trains have priority in running. To help operating staff, they are grouped into classes; these were formerly identified using letters. When the letter groups were replaced by numerals on 18 June 1962, the classifications became:

1. (formerly A) Express passenger, newspaper, or breakdown train; express diesel car; snow plough on duty; light engine proceeding to assist disabled train.
2. (B) Ordinary passenger, branch passenger or "mixed" train; rail motor (loaded or empty); ordinary passenger or parcels diesel car; breakdown train not on duty.
3. (C) Parcels, fish, fruit, livestock, milk or other perishable train composed entirely of vehicles conforming to coaching stock requirements; empty coaching stock (not specially authorised to carry Class A [sic] code).
4. (C) Express freight, livestock, perishable or ballast train pipe-fitted throughout with the automatic vacuum brake operative on 90 per cent of the vehicles.
5. (D) Express freight, livestock, perishable or ballast train with not less than 50 per cent vacuum braked vehicles piped to the engine.
6. (E) Express freight, livestock, perishable or ballast train with 20 per cent vacuum braked vehicles piped to the engine.
7. (F) Express freight, livestock, or ballast train not fitted with continuous brake.
8. (H) Through freight or ballast trains not running under C, D, E or F [sic] conditions.
9. (J) Mineral or empty wagon train.
  (K) Pick-up branch freight, mineral or ballast train.
0. (G) Light engine(s) with not more than two brake vans.

The classes are periodically revised, and since 13 December 2017, the classes have been:

1. Express passenger train; nominated postal or parcels train; breakdown or overhead line equipment train going to clear the line (headcode 1Z99); traction unit going to assist a failed train (1Z99); snow plough going to clear the line (1Z99)
2. Ordinary passenger train; Officers' special train (2Z01)
3. Freight train if specially authorised; a parcels train; autumn-railhead treatment train; empty coaching stock train if specially authorised
4. Freight train which can run up to 75 mph (120 km/h)
5. Empty coaching stock train
6. Freight train which can run up to 60 mph (95 km/h)
7. Freight train which can run up to 45 mph (70 km/h)
8. Freight train which can run up to 35 mph (55 km/h)
9. Class 373 train; other passenger train if specially authorised
0. Light locomotive or locomotives

=== Destination letters ===
For long-distance trains, the country is divided into areas based upon the old British Rail regions. Each one is assigned a letter as follows:

- E: Eastern
- L: Anglia
- M: Midland
- O: Southern
- S: Scotland
- V: Western

A train going from one region to another is given the letter of the destination region in its headcode. Prior to 1967 N was used to signify trains destined for the erstwhile North Eastern region.

For trains internal to a region, the remaining letters can be used to indicate either:

- A destination zone inside that region, or
- A route within that region.

Other regions can use these letters for different areas, but the inter-regional codes have the same meaning throughout the country.

In 2007, a special letter Q was introduced for track recording trains, such as the Network Rail New Measurement Train. This emphasises to signallers that the train is to run its booked route as it is recording, not to be diverted without the prior knowledge of the controller. Prior to this, trains operated by British Rail Research Division used the letter T.

The letters X and Z are generally reserved for special use – see Special numbering.

=== Individual identifier ===
Because there are many trains of the same type heading for similar destinations (for example, most expresses to Scotland have headcodes beginning with 1S) the last two digits are used to separate individual services or to indicate the route (generally for suburban services).

Every train has an 8 digit code assigned to it which is used to ensure that every train has a unique ID within TRUST. This is subdivided into 3 parts. For example, a headcode for the 05:56 East Midlands Railway Sheffield - St Pancras service would be written thus: 251C11M5. This is divided into 3 parts. The part at the beginning (25) shows the origin for this service. In this case, 25 = Sheffield. Start locations have a 2 digit location code. 1C11 is the train reporting number that is visible to the signaller and the train crew. The final component (M5) is the version of this service being run. This will vary for a planned change of route or a planned change in timings. This tells what version of the timetable the service is booked to run on and is used in delay recording and performance management.

== Examples ==
- The 06:09 CrossCountry service from Bath Spa to Glasgow Central is an express passenger service, so it is a class 1 train. It is going from the Western to the Scottish region, so it is given the letter S for its destination. It is one of the first services in the day, and so its headcode is 1S35.
- The 09:00 London North Eastern Railway service from London King's Cross to Edinburgh Waverley is an express passenger service, so is a class 1 train. It is going to the Scottish region, so is given the letter S. Its headcode is 1S09.
- The 22:00 Avanti West Coast service from London Euston to Crewe is internal to the Midland region, so it uses the Crewe (and Stoke) letter K for its destination. As it is a late evening service, the two digits on the end of the headcode are higher. Its headcode is 1K77.
- In some areas, more particularly with local services, some services will recycle headcodes. For example, the 06:11 Arriva Rail North Colne to Preston service has the headcode 2N81, followed by the 07:09 service which has the headcode 2N82. Subsequent services are numbered consecutively up to 2N89, before the numbers are recycled with the 16:11 departure also having the headcode 2N81.
- The china clay train from Cliffe Vale to St Blazey is limited to 60 mph, so it is a class 6 train. It is going to the Western region, and its headcode is 6V70.
- However, if 6V70 ran with a different, slower set of wagons restricted to 45 mph, it could run as 7V70, and if no wagons needed to be moved, it could run as 0V70 (engine only).

== Special numbering ==
It is common practice for empty coaching stock (class 5) trains on the way to form a service or returning to depot having completed a service to run with the same code as that service, with the 1 or 2 prefix altered to 5 – hence, 5P23 is the empty stock to form express passenger service 1P23. Similarly, locomotives on the way to pick up or having dropped off a train, or running round to change the direction of travel, are given the train number but with the prefix altered to 0.

An unusual situation arose with the opening of the Channel Tunnel: many continental train reporting numbers are all numeric. Eurostar trains therefore have a 9Oxx or 9Ixx reporting number in Britain and a corresponding 90xx or 91xx number in Europe, neatly utilising the similarity between the letters O and I and the numbers 0 and 1 to unite the two reporting number systems.

Some passenger services operate with class 9s to differentiate them from other services.

Trains with some specific requirements, such as out-of-gauge loads or the Royal Train, run with the letter X, and special trains not in the regular train service (e.g. charters, railtours, emergency trains or as-required locomotive moves) have Z. Automatic Route Setting code prevents the automatic routing of trains with the letter X in their headcode and signallers must route these trains manually. The GNER White Rose service from London King's Cross to Leeds formed of a 16 carriage Regional Eurostar set ran with a prefix of 1X due to the train's unusually long length.

Rail replacement bus services are run under the headcode 0B00. In a similar manner, shipping services run on behalf of or in tandem with rail services are given headcode 0S00.

Tyne & Wear Metro trains have three-digit numbers which are displayed in the driver's cab window. Those on the Sunderland line are generally in the range 101 – 112, and the set operates all day on the Newcastle Airport to South Hylton route with this number. When on Network Rail metals (i.e. south of Pelaw to South Hylton) the initial digit '1' is replaced by '2I' to give a four-digit TOPS Train Reporting Number, e.g. train 104 becomes 2I04, although the three-digit number in the cab remains unaltered.
