= British Rail Classes 445 and 446 =

Prototype British electric multiple unit trainsets

British Rail Class 445 and 446
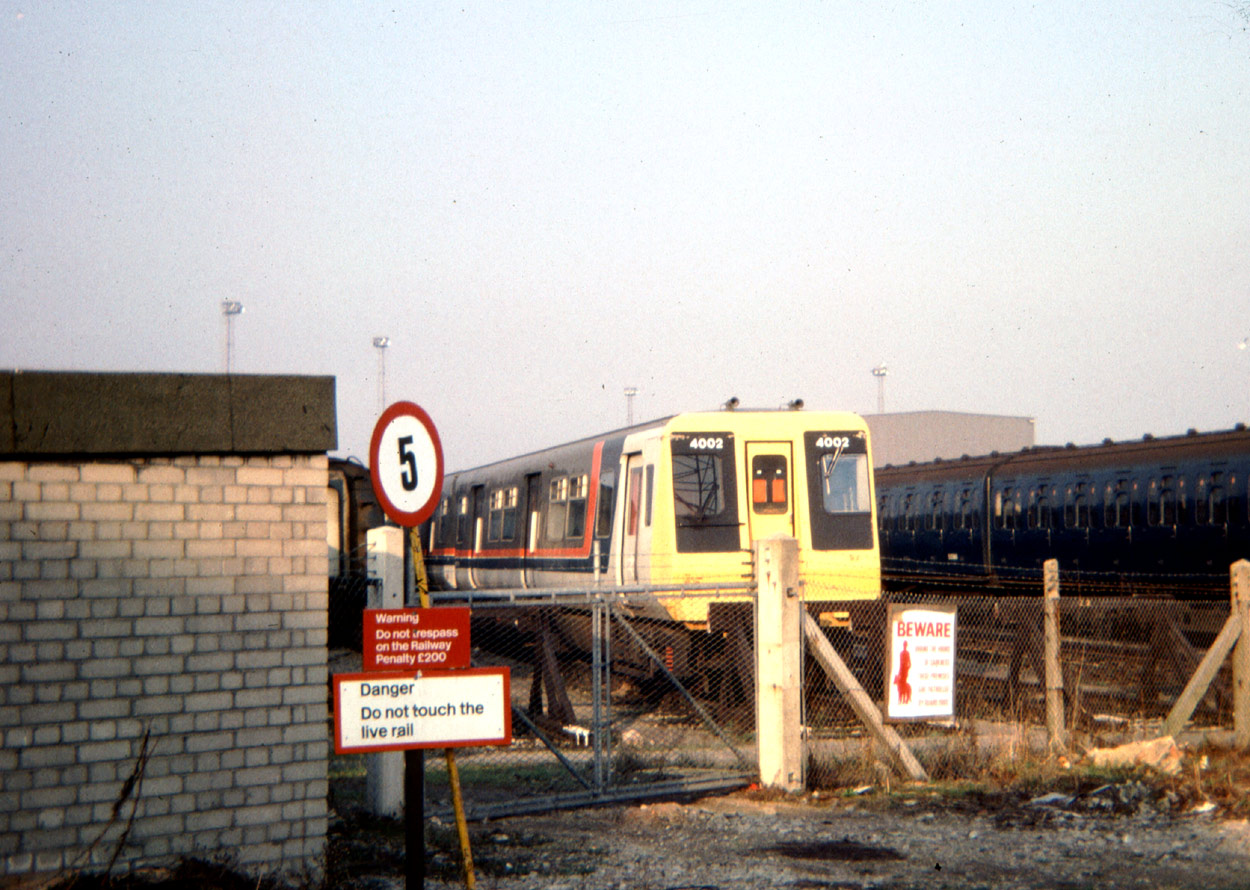
- 4PEP unit No.4002 in the sidings at Wimbledon depot
- In service: 1971-1980
- Manufacturer: BREL
- Order nos.: 30818 (DMSO, 445, 446); 30819 (MSO, 445)
- Built at: BREL York
- Family name: 1972 design (PEP)
- Constructed: 1971
- Entered service: 1973
- Number built: 2 × 4-car (445); 1 × 2-car (446)
- Number scrapped: All
- Formation: 2/4 cars per trainset: DMSO+MSO+MSO+DMSO (445); DMSO+DMSO (446)
- Diagram: 861 (DMSO, 445, 446); 862 (MSO, 445)
- Design code: PEP
- Fleet numbers: 4001-4002 (445, set); 2001 (446, set); 64300-64305 (DMSO, 445, 446); 62426-62429 (MSO, 445)
- Capacity: 280 (445); 136 (446); 68S (DMSO); 72S (MSO)
- Operator: British Rail

Specifications
- Train length: 264 ft 10 in (80.72 m) (445); 132 ft 5 in (40.36 m) (446)
- Car length: 64 ft 11 1/2 in (19.799 m) (DMSO); 65 ft 4 1/4 in (19.920 m) (MSO)
- Width: 9 ft 3 in (2.82 m)
- Height: 11 ft 6 1/2 in (3.518 m)
- Doors: Bi-parting sliding
- Maximum speed: 75 mph (121 km/h)
- Weight: 31 long tons 6 cwt (31.8 t) (DMSO, 64305); 35 long tons 7 cwt (35.9 t) (DMSO, others); 34 long tons 6 cwt (34.9 t) (MSO)
- Traction motors: 4 × GEC (per car)
- Power output: 4 x 100 hp (75 kW) (per car): 1,600 hp (1,200 kW) (445, total); 800 hp (600 kW) (446, total)
- Electric system: 750 V DC third rail
- Current collection: Contact shoe
- Bogies: BREL BP8 (2001); BREL BT5 (4001); Mk6 (4002, 446); F-type (64305)
- Braking systems: Air EP/rheostatic (445); Air, rheostatic (446)
- Coupling system: Scharfenberg (outer); Bar (inner)
- Multiple working: Within type only
- Track gauge: 1,435 mm (4 ft 8 1/2 in) standard gauge

The PEP (Prototype Electro Pneumatic Train) Stock were prototype electric multiple units used on British Rail's Southern and Scottish Regions during the 1970s and early 1980s. They were forerunners of the British Rail Second Generation electric multiple unit fleet. Three units were built, one two-car unit (2001), and two four-car units (4001/4002). Under TOPS, the driving cars were originally classified as Class 461 with the non-driving motor cars as Class 462. They were later reclassified as Class 445 (4PEP) and Class 446 (2PEP).

Internal layout was for commuter services; low-backed, bus-style 2+2 seating in open saloons, wide gangways with hanging straps, and no lavatory facilities. They were the first electric multiple units designed by British Rail with electric sliding doors, outside the Scottish Region. They were unable to operate with any other stock due to their new coupling system. Externally, 2001 was finished in unpainted aluminium, while 4001/4002 were painted in all-over Rail Blue. In passenger use, they normally operated together as a ten-car formation.

== Design ==
On the 4-PEP units the non-driving cars were powered, similar to London Underground practice at the time, but a departure from previous British Railways designs where there had not been any 4-car units with all axles powered. Also introduced for the first time was rheostatic braking with cam-controlled analogue logic, and fluorescent lighting working at 50 Hz. Interior design was open saloons with 2+2 seating, although this was not considered to be finalised until after trial running, and also included communicating doors between coaches and between units, with the driving cars having 2 pairs of sliding doors each and 3 pairs on the non-driving coaches.

== Departmental use ==
After the units were withdrawn from passenger service, they continued to be used by the Research department for further tests. For this purpose, the units and individual carriages were all renumbered into the departmental series. The two Class 446 power cars were teamed with a newly built pantograph trailer and became TOPS Class 920, number 920001. This was then used for the development of Classes 313–315.

== Production classes ==
The production-run classes which are most visibly similar to the prototype Stock are the dual voltage 750 V DC / 25 kV AC Class 313, the 25 kV AC Classes 314 and 315, and the 750 V DC Classes 507 and 508. It was also planned that the rolling stock for the services through the proposed Picc-Vic tunnel, intended as Class 316, would have formed part of the PEP family.
