= British Rail Class 316 =

There have been three distinct types of British Rail electric multiple unit that are referred to as Class 316.

- British Rail Class 316 (Picc-Vic), an unbuilt class of electric multiple unit intended as part of the BREL 1972 "PEP" family for the Picc-Vic tunnel, proposed in the 1970s
- British Rail Classes 316 and 457, a single testbed EMU, converted from the Class 210 DEMU for the upcoming Networker series of EMUs in the 1980s
- British Rail Class 307, a single Class 307 electric multiple unit converted in 1992 for use as a testbed for the traction equipment to be used in the upcoming Class 323
