= British Rail Class 316 (Picc-Vic) =

- Artist's impression of a Class 316
- Family name: BREL 1972
- Replaced: Class 104 (planned); Class 304 (planned); Class 504 (planned)
- Formation: 3/4 cars per set
- Operators: SELNEC (planned)
- Depots: Queens Road (planned)
- Lines served: Picc-Vic network (planned)

Specifications
- Electric system(s): 25 kV 50 Hz AC Overhead
- Current collector(s): Pantograph
- Track gauge: 1,435 mm (4 ft 8 1/2 in) standard gauge

The British Rail Class 316 was a proposed type of electric multiple unit intended for use on planned urban rail services in Greater Manchester. Intended as part of the family of EMUs descended from the prototype "PEP" stock, the class was never proceeded with as the planned services for which it was to be built were cancelled.

== Background ==
=== "Picc-Vic" proposal ===
In 1971, the South-East Lancashire and North-East Cheshire (SELNEC) Passenger Transport Executive, the body responsible for public transport in and around the Greater Manchester area, proposed the construction of a new underground railway tunnel intended to link Manchester's two remaining major railway termini, Piccadilly and Victoria, to create a new urban metro network. This tunnel, nicknamed the "Picc-Vic", was intended to link the disparate rail networks to the north (from Victoria) and south (from Piccadilly) of the city for the first time, allowing services through the Manchester city centre. At the time, the planned routes that would have been joined to the tunnel were a mix of electrified and non-electrified; the Bury Line, from Victoria, used a unique, 1200 V DC third rail system; the Buxton line was unelectrified, while the Styal, Crewe and Stafford lines were all electrified using 25 kV AC from overhead wires (OHLE). The proposal would have seen the entire planned network run using OHLE, which had recently opened on the West Coast Main Line as far as Manchester Piccadilly. As a consequence of this, new rolling stock was planned to operate the proposed services.

=== PEP rolling stock ===
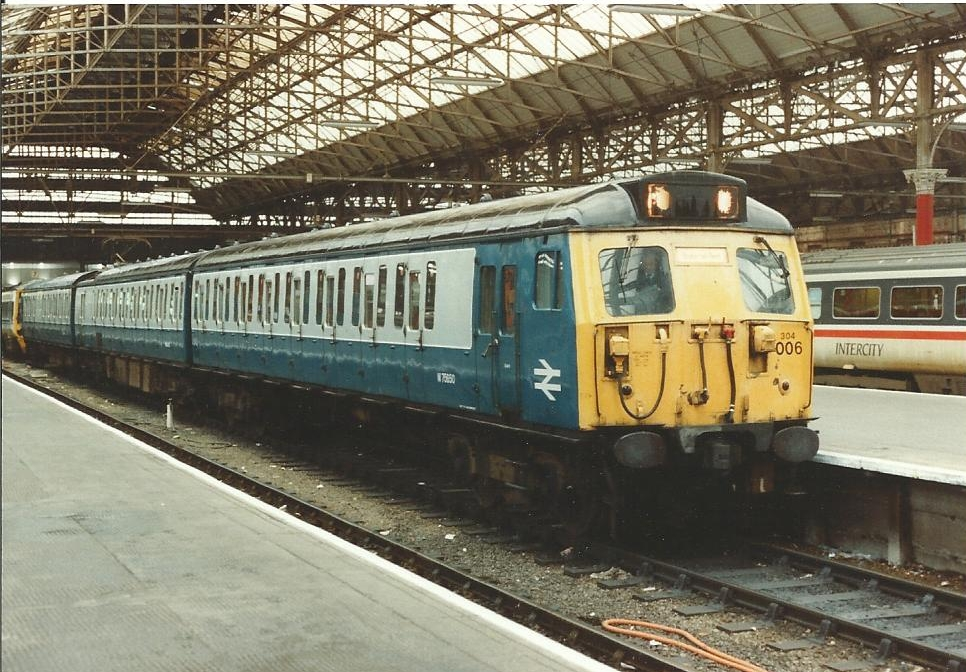
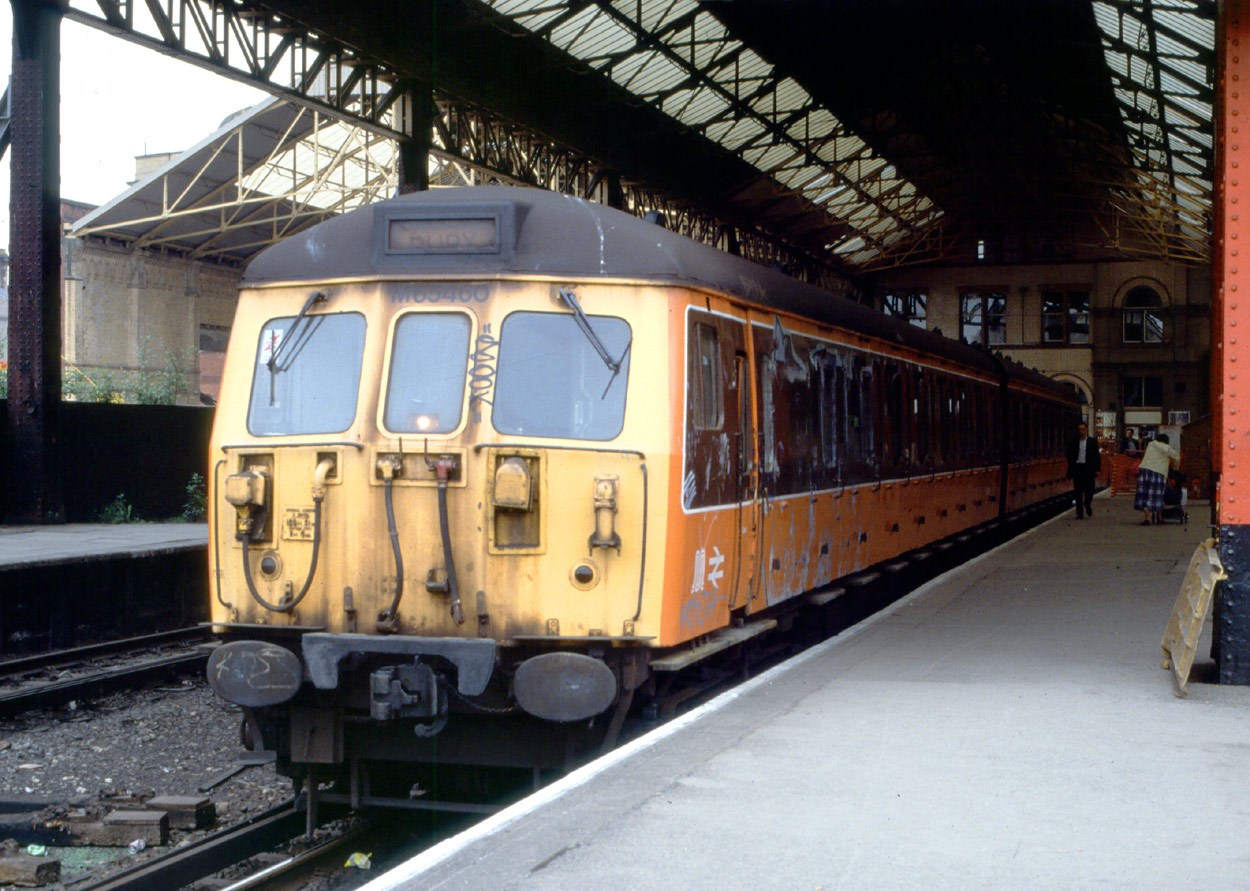
The Class 304 and Class 504 EMUs were both to be replaced on the "Picc-Vic" routes by Class 316s

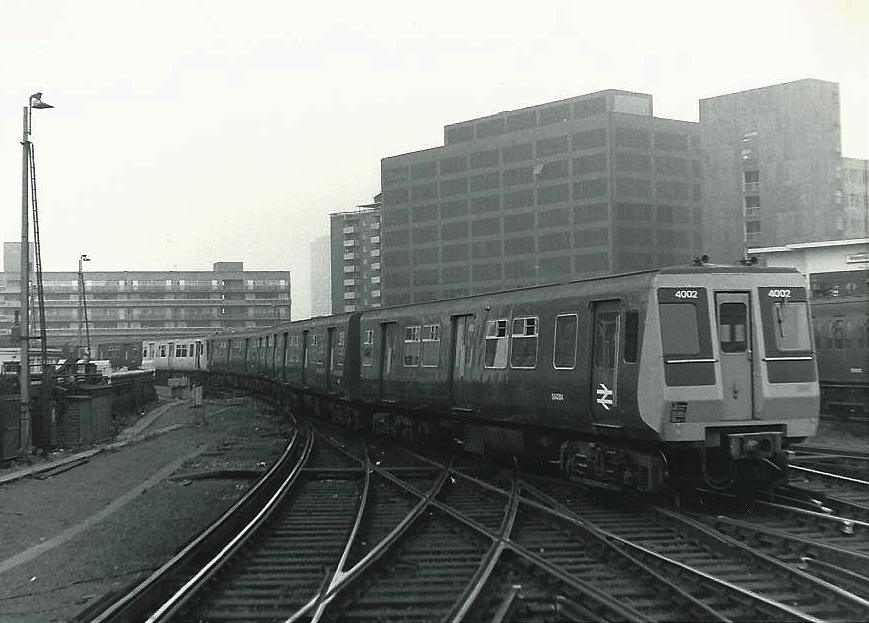
A prototype 4-PEP Class 445 pictured in 1975

Because of the requirements of operating in the central tunnel section, the initial SELNEC specification for new trains stated that they would require both sliding doors and end connections, which did not feature together on then current rolling stock operated by British Rail. The initial publicity for the Picc-Vic plan, which was described as "Manchester's tube project", showed an artist's impression of a platform with a train resembling the 1967 Stock, as used on the Victoria line in London. However, the twin bore tunnels were intended to be built with a diameter of 18 ft (5.5 m), large enough to accommodate both a main line train type, and the OHLE wires. (Note: This is similar to the Northern City Line, a short underground route in London also built for the purposes of access by full sized rolling stock. However, the diameter of these tunnels is 16 ft (4.9 m), and thus unable to accommodate the OHLE wires. As a consequence, the Northern City Line is electrified using 750 V DC third rail, and requires the use of dual voltage EMUs. As of August 2020, services on the Northern City Line are operated by Class 717s.)

At the same time, British Rail was in the midst of testing a new suburban train type in the Southern Region. These prototype units, eventually designated as Class 445 and 446 under TOPS, were different from any previous rolling stock: they were constructed of aluminium rather than steel, were an all in one design rather than a coach body on top of a separate underframe, and had sliding doors. Although the Class 445 and 446 were only prototype units, the information garnered from their use, both in initial testing and passenger service in the Southern Region, and later in departmental use as testbed units, led to the production of a new series of suburban EMUs that came into use in the mid to late 1970s. (Note: The production types derived from the original PEP prototypes were Class 313, Class 314, Class 315, Class 507 and Class 508)

In 1975, SELNEC (by then renamed as the Greater Manchester Passenger Transport Executive) published a new Picc-Vic publicity brochure that went into greater detail about the potential type of rolling stock that would be used, with an image of a Class 445 unit used to indicate the proposed type of train. The front cover also had an artist's impression of a train resembling the new types then in development for the urban networks in London, Liverpool and Glasgow. To fit with the TOPS classification of the other types powered via OHLE, the planned units for Manchester were assigned as Class 316.

The Class 316 units were intended to replace a mix of different types; the unelectrified Buxton line (which would have had services as far as Hazel Grove) was predominantly operated by Class 104 DMUs. Other services from Piccadilly were primarily operated by Class 304 EMUs, while Class 504 units operated over the uniquely electrified Bury line from Victoria.

=== Cancellation ===
Although specifications for the Class 316 units were prepared by the British Rail Research Division at Derby, no concrete tender proposals were issued to prospective manufacturers before the final cancellation of the Picc-Vic project in 1977.

=== Subsequent cross-city connection ===
Following the cancellation of the Picc-Vic project, the GMPTE came up with an alternative proposal for a street based light rail network, which would take over the Bury line (as envisaged in the Picc-Vic plan), and the line from Manchester Piccadilly to Altrincham, which would be joined by an on-street tram route. This eventually became Phase 1 of the Manchester Metrolink, which utilized a new-build fleet of 26 AnsaldoBreda T-68 light rail vehicles. This fleet, which eventually numbered 32, was replaced at the end of 2014 by the Bombardier M5000 type.

== Gallery ==
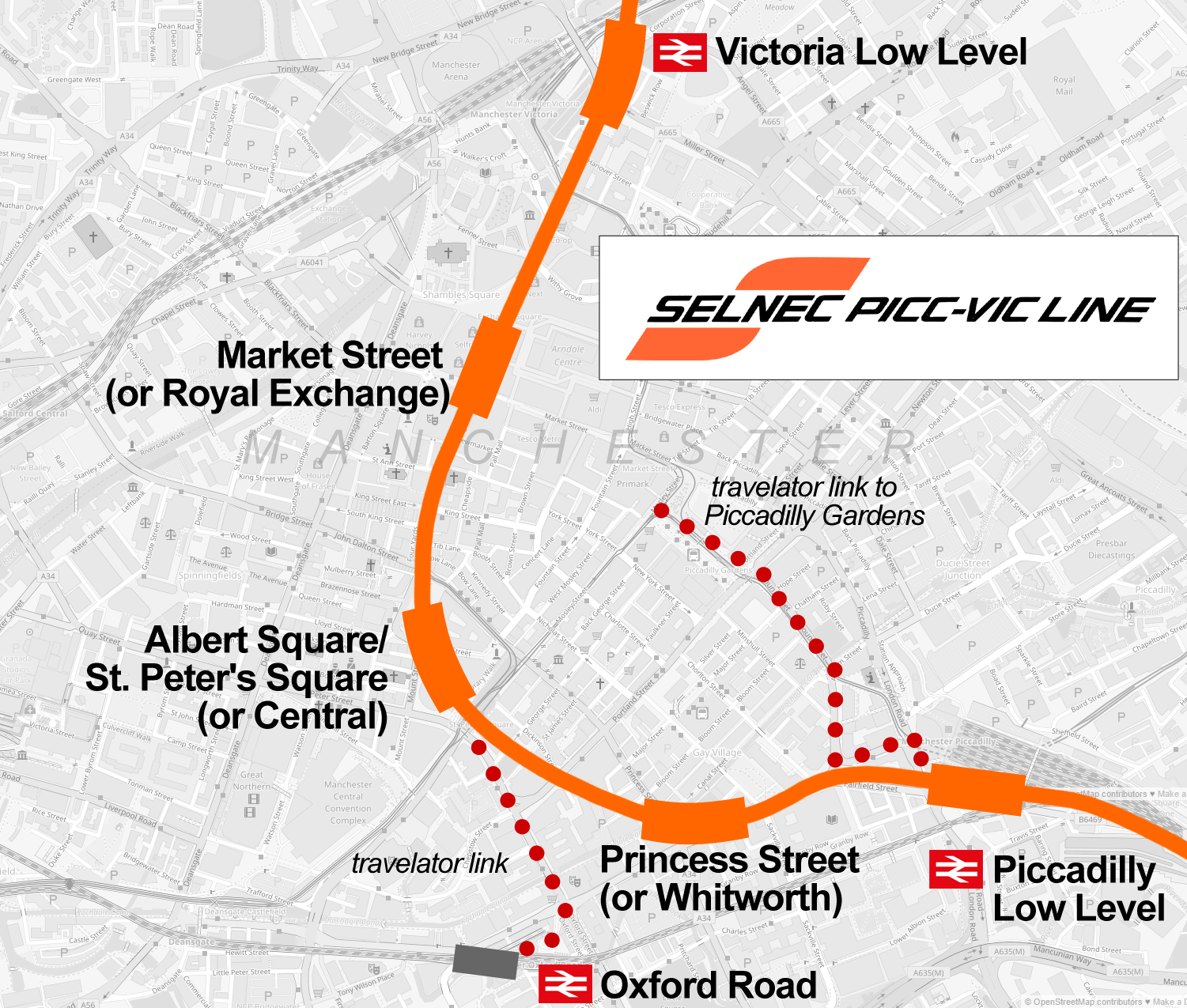
The "Picc-Vic" proposal would have seen a tunnel under central Manchester connecting the city's two main railway stations, Piccadilly and Victoria.

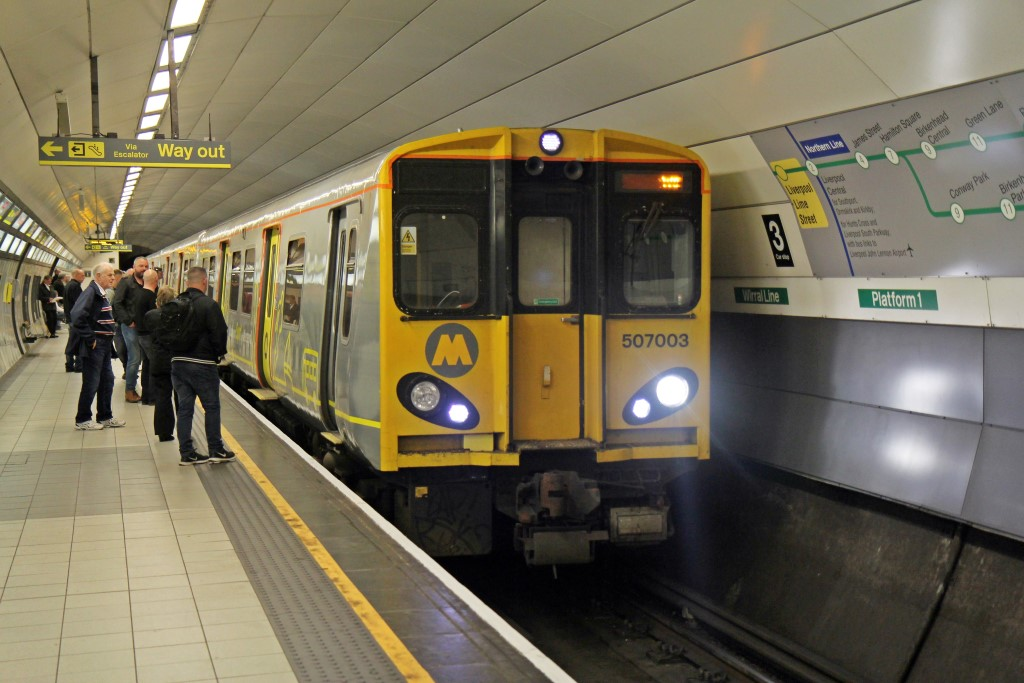
The prototype PEP rolling stock favoured by SELNEC led to later developments such as the Class 507 (pictured here at Liverpool Lime Street underground station).

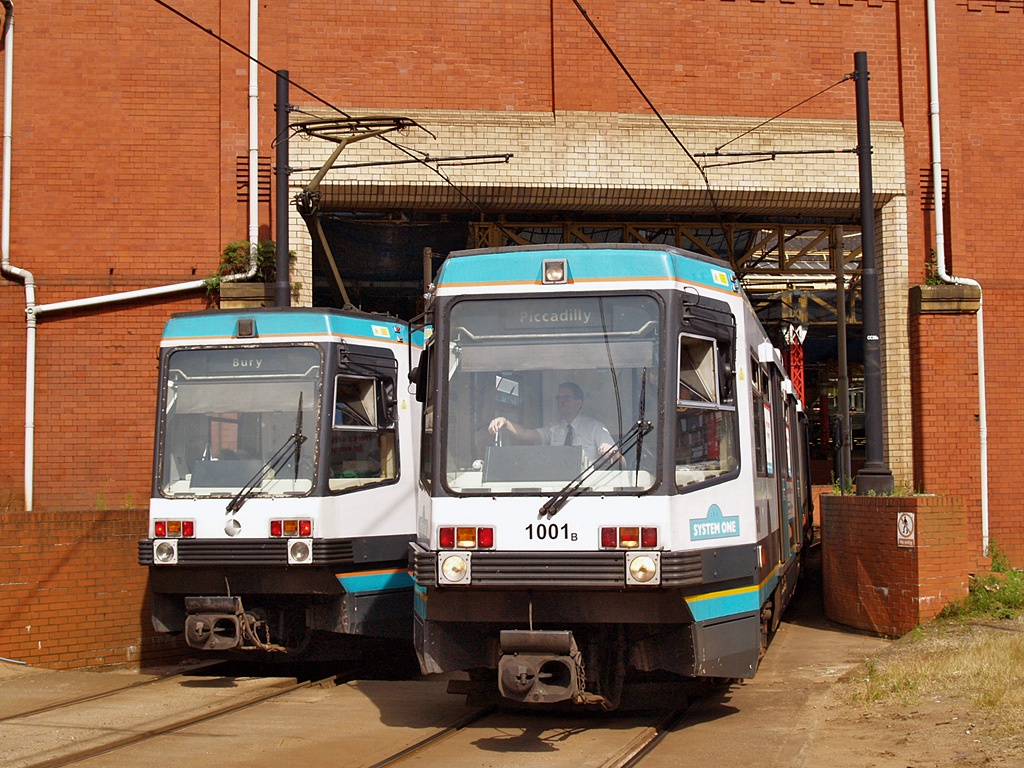
The cancellation of the Picc-Vic proposal led to alternatives being discussed, ultimately seeing the inauguration of the Metrolink light rail system in 1992, using AnsaldoBreda T-68 LRVs.
