= Rail signaller =

Person controlling the movement of trains

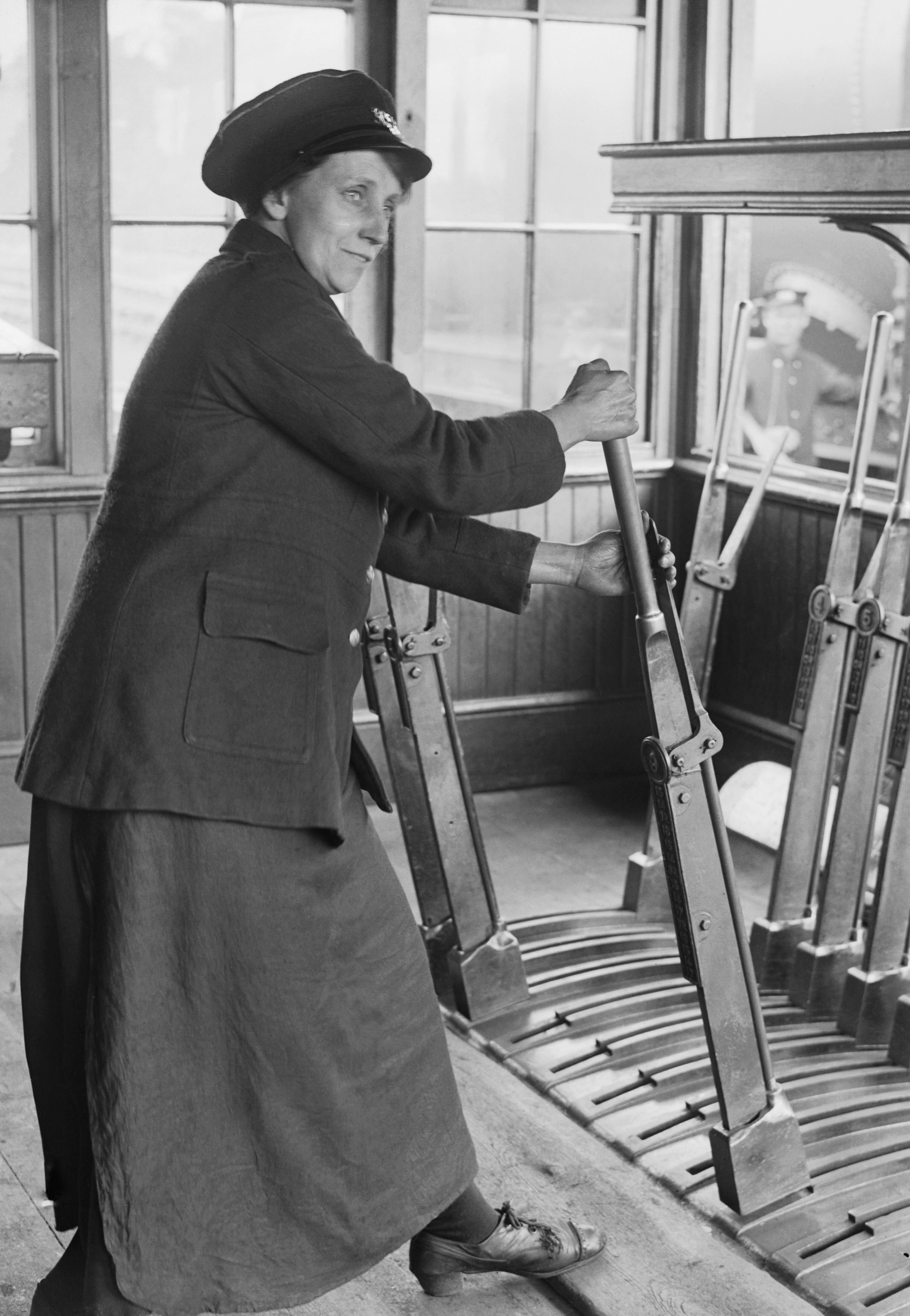
Signalwoman in a Great Central cabin at Annesley, Nottinghamshire, 1918

A signalman or signaller is an employee of a railway transport network who operates the points and signals from a signal box in order to control the movement of trains.

== History ==
The first signalmen, originally called Railway Policemen (leading to the nickname of 'Bobby'), were employed in the early 19th century and used flags to communicate with each other and train drivers. The railways were already in existence by then and The British Transport police say that,"early railway policemen were probably sworn in as special constables under a statute passed in 1673 during the reign of Charles II. They were appointed to preserve law and order on the construction site of the railway patrol and protect the line control of the movement of railway traffic.) and hourglasses for the purpose of Time Interval Working between stations.)

In South Africa, a local rail signaller named Jack achieved some fame for the unique distinction of being a chacma baboon.

== Additional duties ==
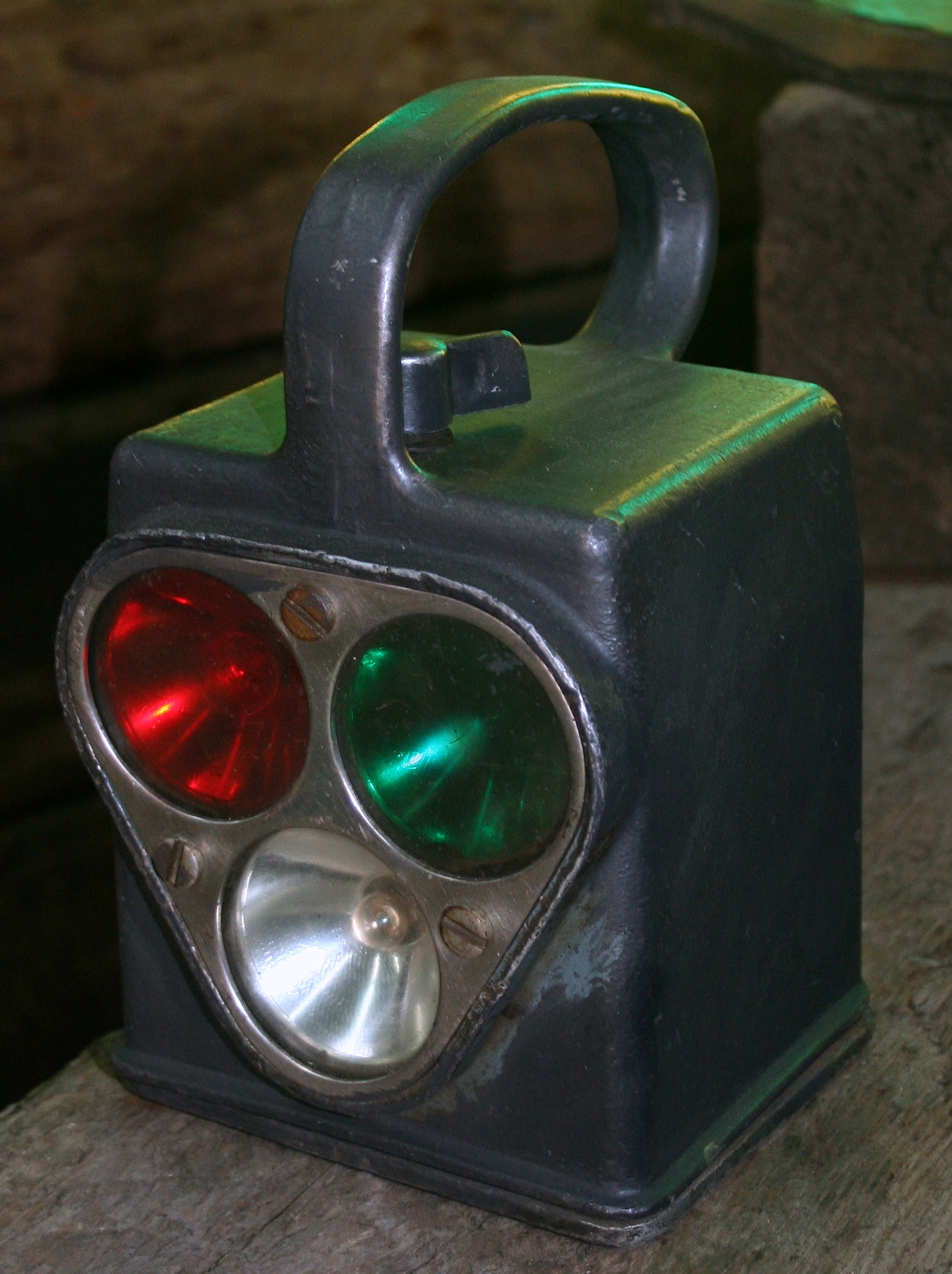
A hand-held railway signal lamp, on display at Israel Railway Museum

It was a signalman's duty to check each train that passed their signal box, looking for the red tail lamp exhibited on the trailing vehicle, the sighting of which confirmed that the train was still complete, and thus the section was clear.

Each train movement was logged, by hand, in a Train Register Book, and it was normal practice to provide a special desk to support this sizeable book. As well as train movements, every communication between signalmen and adjacent signal boxes via bell codes (when accepting trains or dealing with a token) was logged.

Technological advances including mechanical fixed signals in the 1840s, the electric telegraph and block working in the 1850s, and proper mechanical interlocking from 1856, allowed safer, more expeditious train working, and more complicated track layouts to be controlled single-handedly. The advent of such technological advances gradually led to the provision of an enclosed workspace known as a signal box, signal cabin or interlocking tower.

== Duties today ==
The principles of British-style railway signalling have changed little since the Victorian era and early 20th century. Modern technology has generally reduced the labour required per train movement. In many cases, a switch, button or computer command is used to alter the lie of points and control signals. Although many classic mechanical signal boxes remain in use, these are gradually being replaced by modern power signalling systems on most railways. The heartlands of British-style railway signalling could be said to be the United Kingdom, New South Wales, Victoria, Queensland, India and South Africa.

The signaller's main duty is to ensure trains get from A to B safely and on time. The classic Train Register Book remains in use at most older installations, with train describers and Automatic Train Recording taking its place in more modern power signalling schemes. All trains are listed in a computer system in the UK in time order. This system is known as TRUST. Any train can be found on here together with its schedule and route. If a train is late, it is up to the signaller to ascertain in what order the trains should run, known as regulating trains.

== Health ==
In busy locations, signalling can be very challenging and stressful, in a manner similar to air traffic control. Signallers are therefore susceptible to stress-related illness. Following protracted industrial action from unions and, much more recently, detailed studies on fatigue and ergonomics in the rail industry, prudent operators implemented strict guidelines relating to the length and number of consecutive shifts permissible for safety-critical workers, including signallers. These guidelines are ideally aimed at improving safety and reducing fatigue at work, but also the overall lifestyle of employees. In some cases, physical changes in the work environment also followed these studies, including changes in the design of signal box lighting, seating and signalling equipment.

== Other names ==
The signalman is known by various other corporate job titles, including Signaller, Area Controller and Network Controller. In the United States, a signalman is sometimes officially known as such, but is also known under other names, including Leverman and Switchman. At some locations, a Station master or Porter performs signalling duties in addition to other work such as selling tickets and cleaning. Although the positions of Train Controller and Signalman were always distinct from the inception of the former in 1907, Train Controllers perform work previously executed by Signalmen in some cases. In many railways, modern technology has seen the positions of Signalman and Train Controller united (or reunited, in the sense that traffic regulation and train path allocation were originally duties of the Signalman anyway). Irrespective, the classic Telephone Train Control system has been generally abolished, with a few exceptions.

== Train controllers ==
To improve the efficiency of train working, train controllers (also known as controllers, district controllers, line controllers and area controllers) were progressively introduced on many British-style railways in the early years of the 20th century, the first being on the Midland Railway in 1907. Although the specifics of their duties varied between railways, train controllers were responsible for tracking train movements (especially freight), ensuring freight trains were loaded economically and provided with suitable locomotive power, liaising with train crew rostering personnel, ordering additional trains to run for the carriage of extra freight tonnage or passengers as required, allocating paths for unscheduled services and making alterations to scheduled working in order to maximize efficiency and deal with any irregularity in traffic which may affect smooth operation. On busy railways such as the Midland, it was at times very difficult for signalmen to keep track of train movements and make optimal traffic regulation decisions whilst operating signalling equipment. Consequently, fast trains could be delayed by slower trains on the line ahead. Moreover, there was no-one with specific responsibilities relating to the efficient, economical use of rolling stock in traffic, which made it difficult to manage the contingencies of underutilisation, wastage and allocation of inappropriate locomotive power. In the face of rising costs, operating economies were particularly important to the private British railway companies in the early twentieth century. The Train Controller was intended to manage these and other difficulties. While Train Controllers were responsible for traffic regulation within their areas of control, they generally had no safety-critical responsibilities, which were within the realm of the signalmen and station masters.

=== Method of working ===
Typically, train controllers were stationed at district or "divisional" control offices which were linked by omnibus circuit telephone systems with selective code rings, to all signal boxes in the area. This method of operating was sometimes known as the Telephone Train Control System. If the signalman required directions, he simply lifted the receiver and spoke to the train controller on the omnibus circuit. If the train controller wanted to issue instructions or receive train arrival and departure times, he selected the relevant signal box on his telephone, which rang the control phone therein. There were two main problems with this system. Firstly, the train controllers could become overloaded with path requests from signalmen, train recording and other duties. This led to delays for signalmen waiting for their turn to speak on the omnibus circuit, making the role of the train controller somewhat self-defeating. Secondly, signalmen were often in a better position to make train working decisions by virtue of their experience and by being on the spot, but were prevented from doing so by bureaucratic procedures. In silent admission of the deficiencies of this system, signalmen were generally left to their own devices, especially in the event of a general disruption to train services, during which the train control system simply could not handle the demands placed upon it.

In exceptional cases, district control offices were abandoned and train controllers appointed at key signal boxes (as in the London Midland Region of British Railways in the late 1960s), obviating the need for telephonic communication. This practice was followed by what has been the norm since the introduction of modern power signalling schemes, viz. the traditional train controller's substitution by a senior signalman, signal box supervisor or traffic regulator, situated in the signal box.

=== Power signal boxes ===
In the UK, the beginning of the end for classic "Control" came with the commissioning of large power signal boxes from the 1950s. A power signal box (PSB) often has a number of signalmen operating multiple electric or computerized signalling panels and large illuminated track diagrams showing wide areas of operation. This makes traffic regulation much easier for signalmen to handle among themselves. In some cases, a traffic regulator is appointed, who may be consulted for train working decisions. Following the accident at Ladbroke Grove in 1999, it was resolved that supervisors should be appointed at key signal boxes. However, these supervisors are not train controllers. Similar appointments have been made at major signal boxes in New South Wales since 2012.

== See also ==
- Ledbury Signal Box, an example of a working signal box
- Railway signalling
- Switchman
- The Signal-Man, a short story written by Charles Dickens in 1866
