= TRUST =

Computer system for tracking trains

TRUST (Train RUnning System TOPS) is a Network Rail computer system used for monitoring the progress of trains and tracking delays on Great Britain's rail network. It compares actual train movement events with those planned, allowing delays to be recorded with explanations as to the cause allowing the operation of an incentive scheme to reduce delays.

TRUST is used to record when a train passes a measuring point, which can be used to identify delays, and the cause of the delays. It is based on the TOPS mainframe-based computer system.

TRUST data is part of Network Rail's open data feed, which is publicly-available to encourage innovation in customer information both inside and outside the railway industry. Such data is used by various websites and companies as a source for train movements and cancellations in a variety of applications. A similar computer system is Darwin, from the Rail Delivery Group.

== See also ==
- Rail signaller
