= South West Trains =

Former British train operating company

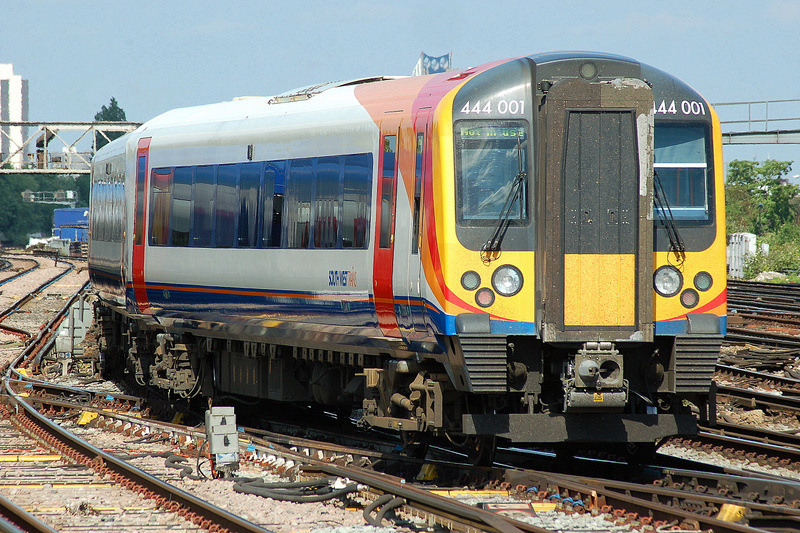
- Class 444 Desiro at Clapham Junction in 2011

Overview
- Franchises: South West; 4 February 1996 – 3 February 2007; South Western; 4 February 2007 – 20 August 2017
- Main regions: Greater London; Surrey; Hampshire; Isle of Wight; Dorset
- Other regions: Berkshire; Wiltshire; Somerset; Devon
- Fleet: 373; 1 Class 73 electro-diesel locomotive; 11 Class 158 Express Sprinter sets; 30 Class 159 South Western Turbo sets; 45 Class 444 Desiro sets; 127 Class 450 Desiro sets; 91 Class 455 sets; 24 Class 456 sets; 36 Class 458 Juniper sets; 2 Class 707 Desiro City sets; 6 Class 483 sets
- Stations called at: 213
- Stations operated: 185 (including Island Line)
- Parent company: Stagecoach
- Reporting mark: SW
- Predecessor: Network SouthEast; Island Line (Island Line franchise)
- Successor: South Western Railway
Route map

Stagecoach South Western Trains Limited, trading as South West Trains (SWT), was a British train operating company owned by Stagecoach, which operated the South Western franchise between February 1996 and August 2017.

SWT operated the majority of commuter services from its Central London terminus at London Waterloo to South West London and was the key operator for outer suburban and regional services in the counties of Surrey, Hampshire and Dorset. It also provided regional services in Devon, Somerset, Berkshire, Wiltshire and on the Isle of Wight through its Island Line subsidiary. Unlike the majority of franchises, SWT operated without subsidies, being a profitable concern due to the high number of commuters that regularly used its services.

The area of operation was the former South Western division of Network SouthEast, and was also roughly that of the pre-1923 London & South Western Railway (excluding everything west of Exeter). As part of the privatisation of British Rail, SWT was taken over by Stagecoach. In 2004, the franchise was retained by Stagecoach when re-tendered. In 2007, the franchise was merged with the Island Line franchise to form a newly extended South Western franchise, which was won by Stagecoach. When next tendered, the franchise was awarded to South Western Railway which took over the franchise on 20 August 2017.

== History ==
=== Origins ===
As a consequence of the privatisation of British Rail during the mid 1990s, railway operations were segmented into various franchises, one of which being the South Western franchise. These franchises were awarded to various privately owned companies following an evaluation of competitive bids. During 1995, it was announced that the Director of Passenger Rail Franchising had awarded the South West Trains franchise to the Scottish transport group Stagecoach. Operations commenced on 4 February 1996, with South West Trains' first train, the 05:10 Twickenham to London Waterloo; it was the first privatised scheduled train to operate for 48 years.

In April 2001, the Strategic Rail Authority awarded Stagecoach a new franchise for the region, its bid having been judged to be superior to those from its rivals, FirstGroup / NedRailways and Sea Containers. The 2001 franchises awarded were (as promulgated) to run for twenty years; however, only one year later, the Strategic Rail Authority decided to reduce the duration of franchises, thus South West Trains was awarded a three-year franchise starting on 1 February 2004. Shortly following this award, SWT placed a substantial order for new rolling stock for the network, it was described as being the largest such order in British history.

During the early days of its franchise, SWT gained notoriety for enacting severe cuts to its services, which were typically attributed to the shortage of drivers; the company sought to remedy this by seeking to hire additional drivers. SWT also implemented significant improvements upon the network, including replacing much of the inherited British Rail-era rolling stock, along with the refurbishment of most stations, which included increasing their accessibility to disabled passengers. There was also an emphasis on the improving the customer experience, such as better access to service information. During the early 2000s, improvements included the introduction of new rail services and the reopening of Chandler's Ford station in Hampshire.

=== Changes ===
From May 2004, a smoking ban on all SWT services was introduced; this move, which came partly in response to a fire caused by a cigarette left next to an under-seat heater during the previous year that raised safety concerns, also pre-empting the public smoking ban that was introduced two years later. Additional staff were deployed onboard trains to help enforce the change. At the time, most other commuter services had already banned smoking, and the measure was claimed by the Evening Standard to be popular with the majority of the travelling public.

On 12 December 2004, the company completely recast its timetable, the first occasion that such an exercise had been performed in the South West region since 1967. This was reportedly motivated by ambitions to bring service provision into line with changing demand and to take into account the different characteristics of modern rolling stock. Within a year, the new timetable had delivered an increase in reliability and punctuality across the network, measured as a 12% improvement in the operator's Public Performance Measure. Further major changes to the timetable followed in subsequent years, including the restoration of services between Yeovil and Yeovil Pen Mill that had been withdrawn under the Beeching cuts.

During December 2005, the Department for Transport (DfT) announced that Arriva, FirstGroup, MTR/Sea Containers, National Express and Stagecoach had been shortlisted to tender for the new South Western franchise, which combined the South West Trains and Island Line Trains franchises; National Express later withdrew. In September 2006, the DfT awarded the franchise to Stagecoach, the new franchise starting on 4 February 2007, for a period of ten years.

Throughout the operation of the franchise, passenger numbers grew year on year, along with rapid spikes in numbers occurring in some years. While many franchises required government funding to sustain their services, SWT operated without any subsidies and was a profitable venture. This outcome was largely on account of the high proportion of commuters that made frequent use of its services. One of the franchise's major ongoing concerns was the overcrowding that occurred on some services, particularly around rush hour, thus SWT's management paid considerable attention to increasing capacity when feasible.

Major measures performed by SWT to expand the network's capacity included improvement works at London Waterloo station and the procurement of new rolling stock. Christian Roth, SWT's engineering director, claimed in 2015 that the firm was in the process of delivering similar capacity improvements to the Thameslink programme at a tenth of the cost and a quarter of the time. While some rival companies chose to pursue driver-only operated trains, eliminating the necessity of a guard, SWT senior manager Brian Souter promised to keep a guard on every service; one consequence of this agreement was strong relations between the company and the trade unions.

Further measures were also proposed by SWT; Tim Shoveller, the company's managing director, periodically spoke out on his desire to eventually introduce double-decker trains to serve its busiest commuter routes. While typically viewed as an effective means of increasing capacity, such ambitions were complicated by multiple factors, the principal of which that there were no double-deck trains in operation that were believed to be suitable for SWT's needs, thus likely necessitating the development of an original design. Procuring a small fleet of bespoke rolling stock would certainly incur a steep price rise over conventional rolling stock, while handling the increased dwell times typically necessary when operating double-deck trains would also adversely impact the timetable; finally, no such rolling stock could be operated until the completion of track lowering across substantial portions of the network, particularly around bridges and tunnels, for sufficient headroom to be achieved.

Between 2012 and 2015, Stagecoach partnered with the British railway infrastructure owner Network Rail to jointly operate London Waterloo via a single management team that operated both tracks and trains in and around the station from a on-site joint control room. At the time, the partnership was hailed as an advancement for rail operations, However, the arrangement was dissolved in 2015 without any official explanation, although anonymous insiders claimed the cause to be Network Rail's reluctance to devolve power over its centralised infrastructure to individual routes, while Stagecoach desired local decisions to be made in partnership.

=== Demise ===
In March 2013, the Secretary of State for Transport announced the DfT was in talks with Stagecoach to extend the franchise until April 2019. At one point, it seemed certain that the franchise would be renewed, information to that effect having been included on the Government's published Rail Franchise Schedule in October 2014. However, in July 2015, Stagecoach confirmed that talks had failed and the franchise would be relet. This outcome was viewed by several industry commentators as being unexpected and inconvenient in its timing; the periodical Rail speculated that Stagecoach's rejection had been largely due to government officials feeling that the state was not receiving a sufficiently large share of the profits being generated.

Stagecoach and a FirstGroup / MTR Corporation joint venture were shortlisted on 4 February 2016 to bid for the new franchise. On 27 March 2017, the franchise was awarded to South Western Railway, in spite of concerns that it would result in a single company holding a monopoly on services between London and the West of England, Dorset and Somerset, due to FirstGroup also operating the Greater Western franchise in those regions.

== Services ==
South West Trains was the key operator for western Surrey, Hampshire and Dorset, and also served Berkshire, Wiltshire, Somerset and Devon. In Greater London, it operated all National Rail services (other than London Overground) in the Royal Borough of Kingston upon Thames and the London Boroughs of Richmond-upon-Thames and Hounslow, and also served the London Boroughs of Merton, Wandsworth and Lambeth.

Most SWT services ran on electrified lines using the 750 V DC third-rail system. A diesel fleet was used for services on the West of England line to Salisbury, Exeter and Bristol, using the unelectrified track beyond Worting Junction just west of Basingstoke, and for Salisbury to Southampton via Romsey services which also served Eastleigh. By 2015, SWT was reportedly operating roughly 1,600 train services each day and managing in excess of 200 stations.

From Waterloo, SWT's London terminus, long-distance trains ran to southern England, including the major coastal population centres of Portsmouth, Southampton, Bournemouth, Poole and Weymouth. There were also trains to Reading, Exeter and Bristol, but these were not the principal fast services from London to those cities, which are operated from London Paddington by Great Western Railway. The majority of its passengers were on suburban commuter lines in inner and south-west London, Surrey, east Berkshire, and north-east Hampshire.

After privatisation in 1996, the network changed considerably, no longer serving West Croydon, Sutton, 'Coastway' stations between Chichester and Brighton, or the Reading to Basingstoke line. Services to Bristol (introduced in 2004 to replace withdrawn Arriva Trains Wales services), Mottisfont and Dunbridge and Dean were introduced after the start of the franchise. Its longstanding services beyond Exeter to Paignton, Plymouth and Penzance, which ran in competition with First Great Western and its predecessors, ceased in December 2009 so as to release stock for the hourly Waterloo to Exeter service.

As with most rail companies, non-folding bicycles were banned from peak-time trains to and from London. However, these restrictions applied only to cyclists boarding or alighting in the area bounded by Hook, Alton, Guildford, Reading and Dorking. The aim was to maximise available passenger space on the most crowded trains.

South West Trains had Quiet Zones, similar to the Quiet Coaches on trains operated by certain other Train Operating Companies. Quiet Zones were available on most outer-suburban services and on some express services and are indicated by notices in the windows and signs on the doors. Passengers in these zones were requested not to use mobile phones to take calls or play music out loud.

=== Routes ===
South West Trains operated suburban and long-distance trains. Main destinations included: London Waterloo, Clapham Junction, Barnes, Richmond, Twickenham, Hounslow, Ascot, Staines, Reading, Windsor & Eton Riverside, Kingston, Raynes Park, Motspur Park, New Malden, Chessington South, Surbiton, Leatherhead, Weybridge, Dorking, Effingham Junction, Woking, Guildford, Aldershot, Alton, Farnborough Main, Fleet, Basingstoke, Haslemere, Andover, Winchester, Eastleigh, Southampton Central, Romsey, Salisbury, Fareham, Portsmouth & Southsea, Brockenhurst, Portsmouth Harbour, Bournemouth, Westbury, Bristol Temple Meads, Weymouth, Yeovil Junction and Exeter St Davids.

=== Main lines ===
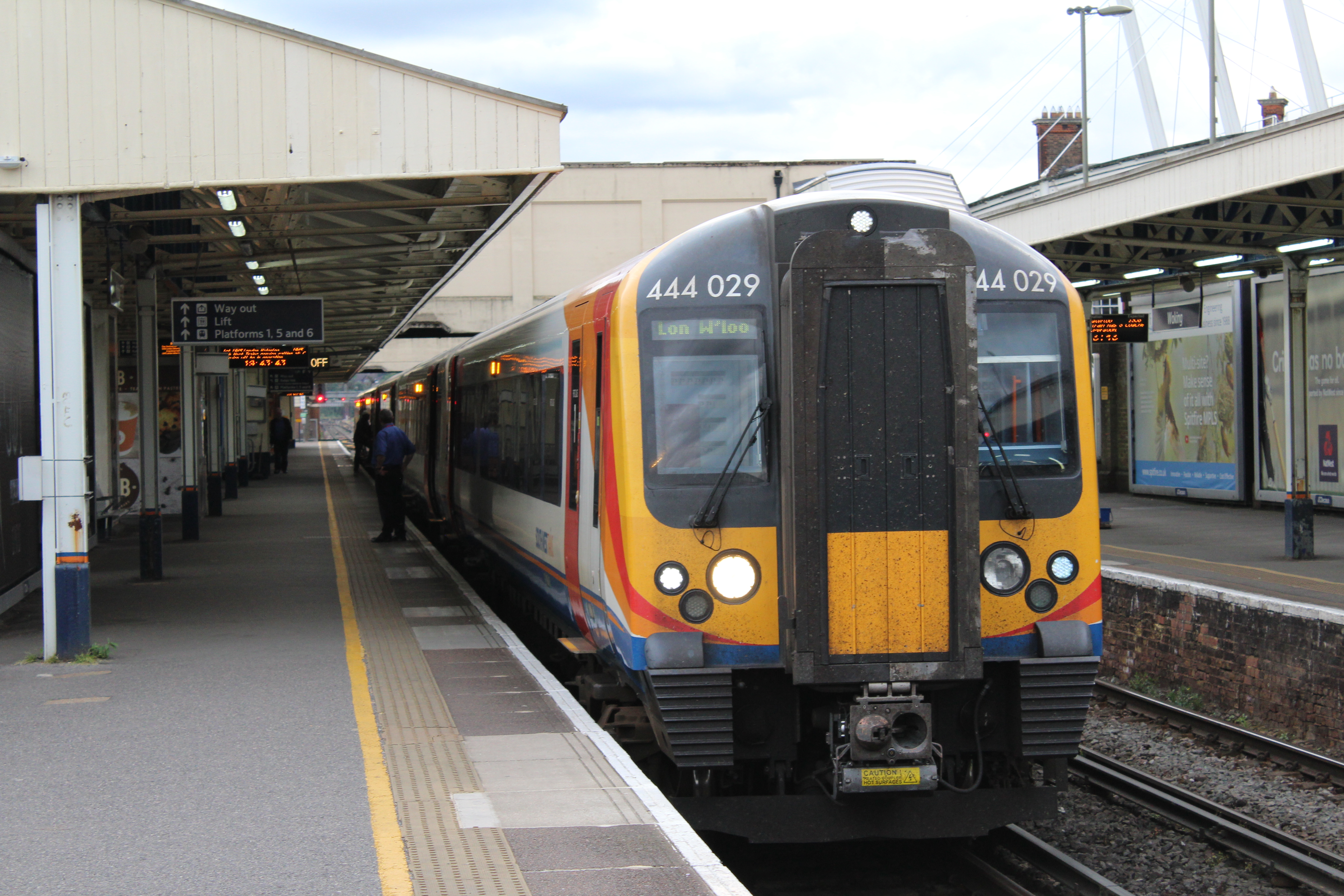
A Class 444 Desiro unit used on longer-distance services on the electrified railway lines.

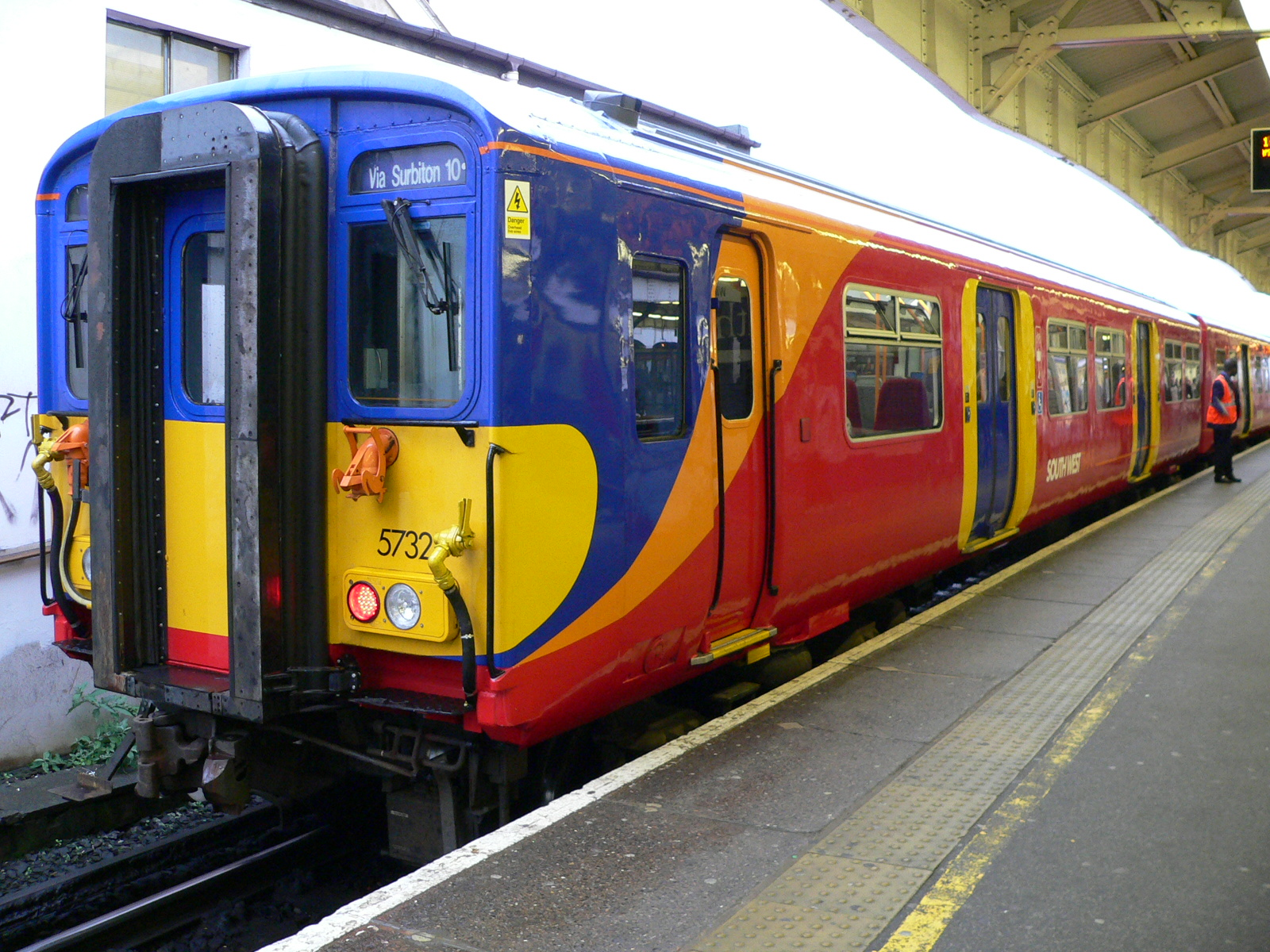
A Class 455 suburban unit at Wimbledon. These were used on inner suburban services.

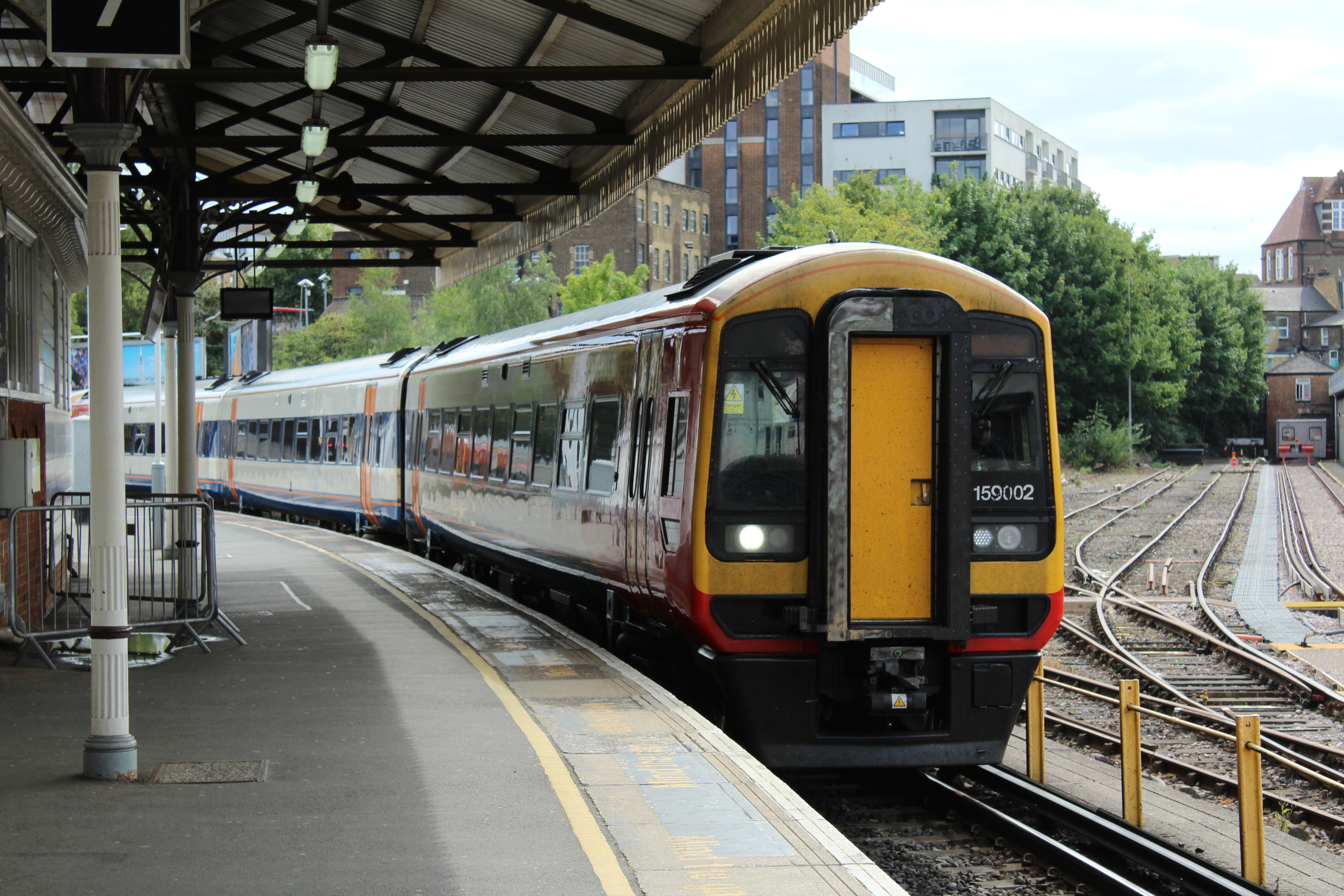
A Class 159 South Western Turbo unit at Clapham Junction. These were used for long distance West of England Mainline services to Salisbury and Exeter St Davids.

The seven main lines operated by SWT were:

- The South West Main Line (SWML) to Southampton Central, Bournemouth and Weymouth. 2 trains an hour through to Weymouth (1 fast and 1 semi-fast) and 1 train an hour to Poole (stopping) Mondays-Saturdays, with Sunday Bournemouth services extended to Poole.
- The Portsmouth Direct line via Guildford and Haslemere: leaves the main line at Woking. 4 trains per hour to Guildford, then 1 semi-fast service and 1 stopping service to Haslemere. The semi-fast service continued as a stopping service to Portsmouth. The fast services ran approximately half-hourly Mondays-Saturdays, 2 trains per hour (1 fast, 1 stopping from Guildford) on Sundays.
- The West of England Main Line to Salisbury, Yeovil Junction and Exeter St Davids: leaves the main line at Basingstoke.
- Wessex Main Line (part): Salisbury to Bristol Temple Meads. This service originated from London Waterloo and divides at Salisbury.
- Heart of Wessex Line (part): Yeovil Junction to Yeovil Pen Mill / Frome. This service originates from London Waterloo and divides at Yeovil Junction.
- London Waterloo to Portsmouth Harbour via Basingstoke and Eastleigh. Hourly service off-peak Mondays-Saturdays, merges with the Poole train on Sundays.
- London Waterloo to Reading via Staines-upon-Thames, Ascot and Wokingham.

=== Suburban services ===
Suburban services diverged from the above routes. Taken in order westwards from Waterloo, travelling down the SWML, they are:

- Waterloo–Reading line: from Clapham Junction
  - The Hounslow Loop line from Barnes to Whitton or Feltham
  - The Windsor branch from Staines-upon-Thames
  - The Chertsey loop line from Virginia Water to Weybridge
  - The Ascot to Guildford line via Aldershot
- The Mole Valley Line, from Raynes Park to Dorking via Epsom
  - The Chessington branch from Motspur Park
  - The branch to Guildford from Leatherhead
- The Kingston loop line, from New Malden (Main Line) to Twickenham (Reading Line)
  - The Shepperton branch from Teddington; normally, these services run via New Malden, some peak services run via Twickenham
- The New Guildford line, to Guildford via Cobham from Surbiton (travellers from Guildford to London can also travel via the main line through Woking)
- The Hampton Court branch, also from Surbiton
- The Alton branch, from Brookwood also serves the Mid Hants Railway, a heritage line

=== Other services ===
- Southampton local lines: Salisbury to Romsey via Southampton Central and Chandler's Ford (previously this service ran to Totton)
- Lymington branch line (Brockenhurst to Lymington Pier)
- Island Line, Isle of Wight, Ryde Pier Head to Shanklin
- Southampton Central to Portsmouth & Southsea

== Ticketing ==
=== Travelcards ===
London Travelcards were available and widely used for journeys into Greater London beyond any of the South West Trains stations. They were valid on London Buses, Tramlink, Docklands Light Railway, London Underground and national rail services within the London travelcard area. All tickets and (London) Travelcards were available on weekly, monthly and annual bases (such tickets are traditionally known as season tickets), a pre-requisite for which is a passport-sized photograph for a booking hall to issue a nationally valid railcard. All ticket pricing structures are regulated by the Office of Rail & Road.

Daily tickets fell into four categories: Peak 'Anytime', Off Peak, Super Off Peak and Advance (pre-booked, long distance). These were broken down into whether the user requires a Single, Return (valid for one calendar month) or a Day Return.

=== Smartcards ===
Oyster pay-as-you-go could be used on services within Greater London. Oyster cards holding season tickets were accepted within the London Travelcard area, in the same way as normal paper Travelcards and season tickets.

In November 2010, the DfT announced that passengers would be able to top up Oyster cards at all stations operated by South West Trains in the London Travelcard area from May 2011. SWT was the last rail company franchise to offer this facility (except at Wimbledon and Richmond stations) for passengers using suburban rail services within the London Travelcard area.

The smartcard scheme for tickets on the national rail system was extended in early 2010 to cover the lines from Weymouth to Basingstoke and from Staines to Wokingham, and on the Isle of Wight, in addition to the current trial area between Staines and Windsor. It was also announced that SWT proposed to reduce operating hours at 24 of its ticket offices.

=== Penalty fares ===
South West Trains issued penalty fares for passengers travelling by train without a valid ticket. However, the company had planned to install at least one self-service ticket machine at each of its served stations in the bid to stop fare evasion. In 2009, ticket gates were installed at Waterloo to improve revenue protection.

=== Megatrain ===
Stagecoach, SWT's parent company, sold seats on some off-peak services under the Megatrain brand from Mondays to Saturdays. This used a similar low-cost model to its Megabus service. Megatrain tickets were available on certain services expected to be lightly loaded. Tickets were generally between London Waterloo and other principal stations, and ticket-holders were assigned to a specific train.

== Performance ==
Latest performance figures released by Network Rail for period 5 (2014/15) were 88.2% (Public Performance Measure – PPM) and 88.9% (Moving Annual Average – MAA) for the 12 months up to 16 August 2014.

== Rolling stock ==
=== Electric ===
==== Desiro fleet ====
The introduction of Desiro rolling stock built by Siemens was to replace the old Class 411, Class 412, Class 421 and Class 423 slam-door trains, which were life-expired and did not meet modern health and safety requirements; a franchise commitment was to replace all slam-door stock by the end of 2005. The Desiro trains have on-board information systems and full air-conditioning. Their faster acceleration is counterbalanced by the need to dwell longer at each station, since they have fewer doors.

The Desiro stock comes in two variants – Class 450 units which have four 20 m cars and are mainly used on suburban and outer-suburban services, and Class 444 units which have five 23 m cars as well as intercity-style door layouts and are used on longer-distance services to Weymouth and Portsmouth Harbour.

==== British Rail EMUs (Class 455) ====
South West Trains operated a fleet of Class 455 metro-style commuter trains on services from London Waterloo to Shepperton, Hampton Court, Woking, Guildford, Dorking and Chessington, as well as services on the Kingston and Hounslow loops and occasionally on Windsor line services. These were built for British Rail.

A full refurbishment programme started in 2004 on the fleet of 91 four-car units, and was completed in March 2008. Modifications included a new 2+2 seating layout with high-back seats, CCTV, cycle storage, wheelchair space, doors that open further to allow for faster alighting, and additional passenger information systems. Almost all of the trains were then withdrawn in early 2026.

==== British Rail EMUs (Class 456) ====
All 24 Class 456 two-car EMUs were transferred from Southern to SWT, with the first units entering SWT service on 23 March 2014. These early 1990s-built units are compatible with the existing Class 455 fleet and are coupled with these to form ten-car trains, increasing capacity on some local services in and out of Waterloo.

==== Coradia Juniper fleet (Class 458/0 – 458/5) ====
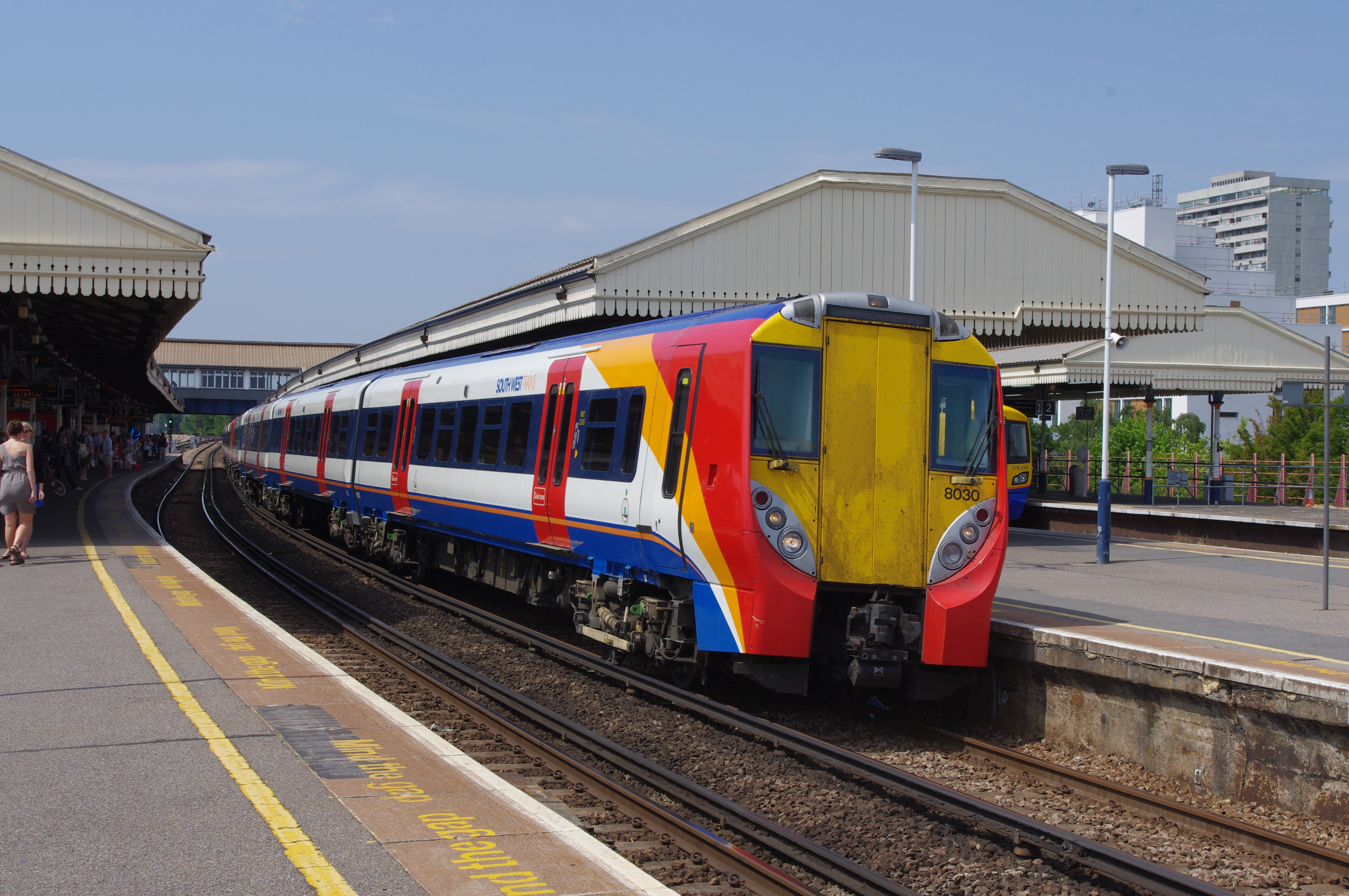
A Class 458 Juniper pre-modifications at Clapham Junction

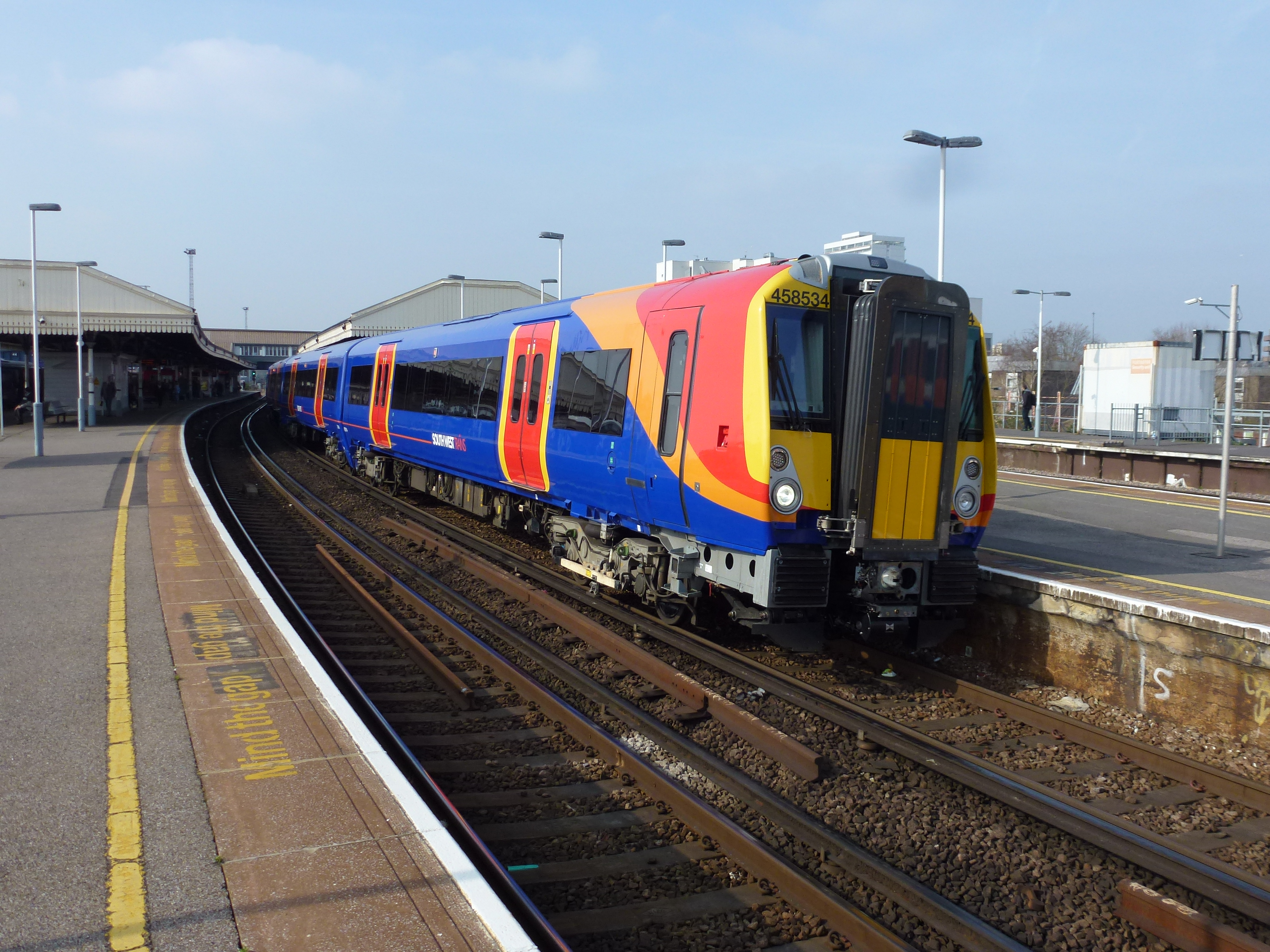
A Class 458/5 Coradia Juniper post-modifications at Clapham Junction

Thirty of these four-car units were ordered by South West Trains in 1998, to create extra capacity and to replace some of the ageing Class 411 (4-CEP) trains, which at the time were on short-term lease. Deliveries of these trains began in 1998.

The class suffered major technical problems, so in the end, none of the older trains were withdrawn from service at that time. It was six more years, in 2004, before the full fleet was in service. In 2003 and 2004, reliability was so poor that, although they were only six years old, South West Trains decided that the units should be replaced by 2005 with the newer Class 450 Desiro units. Only a handful of units were required each day to help maintain services from Waterloo to Reading, and these had been expected to cease after 31 July 2006, when the lease with the rolling stock company expired. An application by SWT to extend this by six months was refused, as the class did not meet all the requirements of disability legislation.

However, later it was decided that, on or before the start of the new franchise in February 2007, the class would be reinstated and take over all operations on the Waterloo to Reading line, indirectly covering the loss of the Class 442. They have been fitted with new, larger destination screens that comply with the disability legislation, but the trains still fall foul in some other areas, such as the height of the door-open buttons.

All 30 Class 458 trains were split up and the 120 vehicles reconfigured into 36 five-car sets, incorporating 60 extra vehicles from the mechanically similar Class 460 formerly used on Gatwick Express services. The five-car sets are now designated Class 458/5 and since 2014 have been coupled together to form ten-car trains.

The first two of the five-car sets were delivered in October 2013, and underwent testing ahead of the introduction of the first ten-car train into service in December 2013. Passenger service started in March 2014, with the work concluding in 2016, thereby rendering the Class 458/0 extinct.

=== Diesel ===
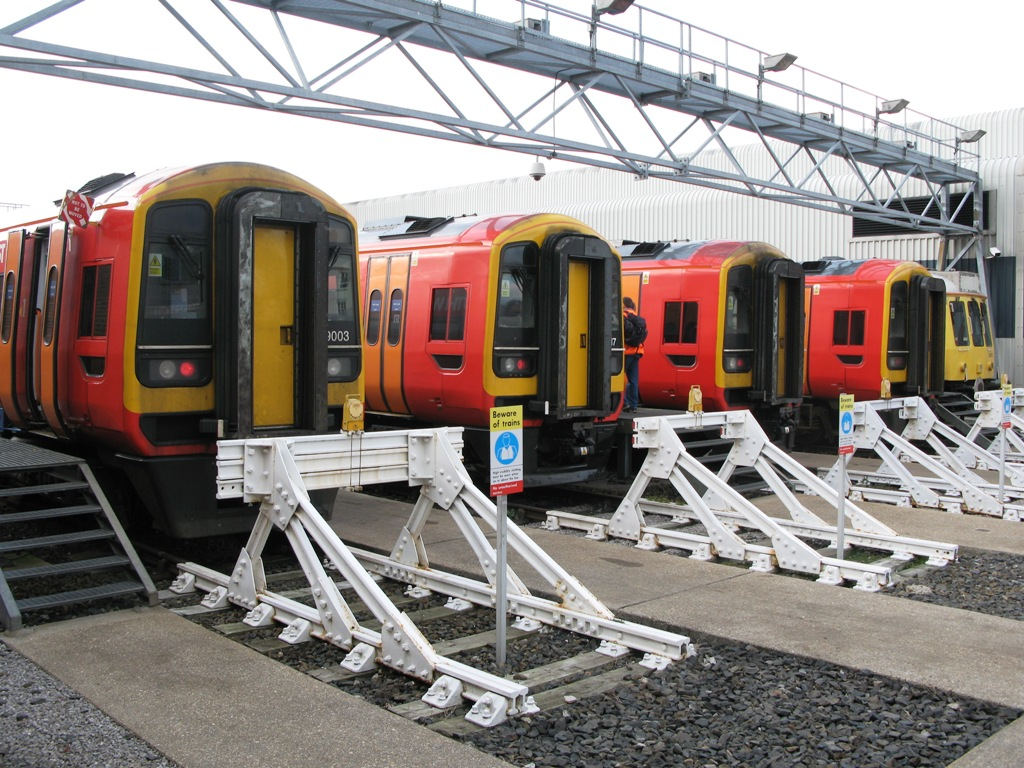
Line of 3 Class 159s, 1 Class 158 and the former route learning Class 960 at Salisbury depot

South West Trains had 11 two-car Class 158 units and 30 three-car Class 159 units (22 Class 159/0 and eight Class 159/1).

The Class 159/1 units were converted at Wabtec, Doncaster from Class 158s, received from First TransPennine Express in exchange for Class 170s. Eleven further two-car Class 158 units were received from First TransPennine Express, which were also refurbished at Wabtec.

The Class 159 has on occasion been used for railtours.

=== Locomotives ===
Although South West Trains did not operate locomotive-hauled services, until 2009 it maintained three Class 73 locomotives for recovery duties. Locomotive 73109 had been in service with SWT since the start of the franchise; the other two, 73201 and 73235, were acquired from Gatwick Express in 2005. 73235 was the only one of the three locomotives to be owned by South West Trains at the end of the Franchise.

=== Fleet at end of franchise ===
Class	Image	Type	Top speed		Carriages	Number	Routes operated	Built
Class	Image	Type	mph	km/h	Carriages	Number	Routes operated	Built
Class 73		Electro-diesel locomotive	90	145	N/A	1	Thunderbird Locomotive	1966
Class 158 Express Sprinter		DMU	90	145	2	11	London Waterloo – Salisbury / Exeter St Davids (Occasionally) / Bristol Temple Meads; Exeter St Davids – Honiton / Axminster (Weekday service); Romsey – Salisbury via Southampton Central; Brockenhurst – Lymington Pier (Weekday services)	1989–1992
Class 159 South Western Turbo		DMU	90	145	3	30	West of England / Heart of Wessex Line / Wessex Main Lines: London Waterloo – Salisbury / Bristol Temple Meads / Exeter St Davids / Yeovil Pen Mill / Frome; Portsmouth Harbour – Basingstoke (Morning Service); Portsmouth Harbour – Southampton Central (Occasionally) Yeovil Junction – Yeovil Pen Mill (Peak Hours only)	159/0: 1992–1993; 159/1: Converted 2006–2007
Class 444 Desiro		EMU	100	160	5	45	Main Line Routes: London Waterloo – Poole / Weymouth London Waterloo – Portsmouth Harbour (Shared with Class 450s Weekdays and Sundays); Limited Outer Suburban Routes	2003–2004
Class 450 Desiro		EMU	100	160	4	127	Main Line Routes: London Waterloo – Portsmouth Harbour (Shared with Class 444s weekdays and Sundays)/ Alton / Basingstoke / Poole (Occasionally) / Reading; Southampton Central – Portsmouth & Southsea; Brockenhurst – Lymington Pier (Weekend services) Outer Suburban Routes: London Waterloo – Windsor & Eton Riverside / Weybridge via Staines-upon-Thames / London Waterloo via Hounslow; Ascot – Guildford; Limited Express and Inner suburban services	2002–2006
Class 455		EMU	75	120	4	91	Inner Suburban Routes: London Waterloo – Shepperton / Hampton Court / Woking / London Waterloo via Hounslow /London Waterloo via Strawberry Hill / Dorking / Guildford via Oxshott or Epsom / Chessington South / Windsor & Eton Riverside	1982–1985; 2004–2007 (refurbished)
Class 456		EMU	75	120	2	24	Used on suburban services in conjunction with services operated by Class 455 units to make 8 & 10 coach trains. Ascot – Guildford	1990–1991
Class 458/5 Coradia Juniper		EMU	75	120	5	36	Outer Suburban Services: London Waterloo – Weybridge / Windsor & Eton Riverside via Staines upon Thames	2013–2016; (199–2002 as Class 458/0); (2000–2001 as Class 460)
Class 707 Desiro City		EMU	100	160	5	2	London Waterloo – Windsor & Eton Riverside via Staines upon Thames	2016–2017

=== Isle of Wight Fleet ===
Class	Image	Type	Top speed		Carriages	Number	Routes operated	Built
Class	Image	Type	mph	km/h	Carriages	Number	Routes operated	Built
Class 483		EMU	45	72.5	2	6	Ryde Pier Head – Shanklin	1938; 1989–1992 (refurbished)

=== Past fleet ===
Former units operated by South West Trains include:

Class	File	Type	Number	Withdrawn
Class 170 Turbostar		DMU	9	July 2007
Class 411 (4Cep)		EMU	29	May 2005
Class 412 (4Bep)		EMU	7	May 2005
Class 421 (4Cig)		EMU	34	May 2005
Class 423 (4Vep)		EMU	66	May 2005
Class 442 Wessex Electrics		EMU	24	February 2007
Class 960		DMU	1	March 2009
Class 458/0 Coradia Juniper		EMU	30	2013–2015

==== Wessex Electrics fleet ====
These Class 442 units were initially dedicated to the Weymouth line but, in the 1990s, began to be operated on the London to Portsmouth direct line also. In preparation for the Class 444 and Class 450 "Desiro" units taking over from the slam-door fleet, the Wessex Electrics were withdrawn from Portsmouth line services and were again wholly dedicated to the Weymouth line.

South West Trains announced that it would be withdrawing these units, and they last ran on 3 February 2007. This move coincided with SWT reinstating all Class 458s for the Waterloo–Reading line. As a result, the Class 444 inherited the Waterloo–Weymouth route and the Class 450 took over some Portsmouth Harbour services, while the Class 442 units went into storage at Eastleigh. From 2008 to 2017, Southern leased these trains for its Gatwick Express service and operated them on services from London Victoria to Gatwick Airport and Brighton. Eighteen Class 442 units were supposed to return to the franchise when the changeover to South Western Railway occurred, but the fleet was withdrawn in 2021 and will now be replaced by modified class 458s.

==== Turbostar fleet ====
In 2000, South West Trains acquired eight 2-car Class 170/3 units to supplement its existing Class 159 fleet. They were used on London to Salisbury services as well as a new Southampton local service, and on Reading to Basingstoke services. They were sometimes pressed into use on Waterloo-Exeter services but, as they were not fitted with end gangways for catering or selective door opening for the short platforms at some stations, this was not a regular route.

From late 2006 to mid-2007, the Class 170 units were gradually transferred to First TransPennine Express in exchange for a larger number of Class 158 units, to expand and standardise the fleet. One unit, 170392, originally built to Southern specifications but taken over by SWT soon after its construction, went to Southern and was converted to a Class 171.

==== Preserved trains ====
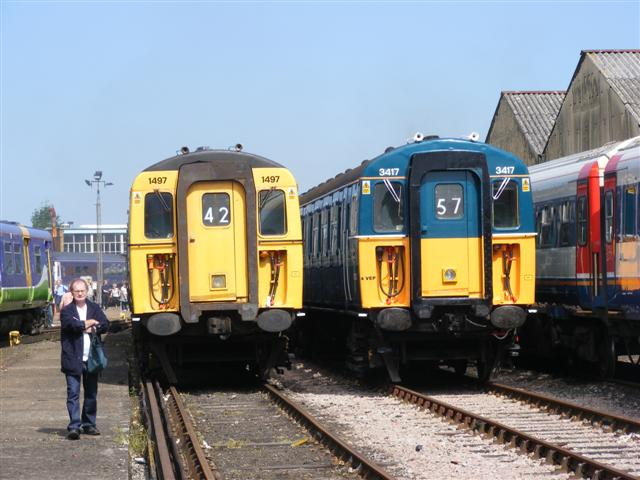
423417 on display at an Open Day at Eastleigh Works in May 2009, alongside one of the operational 3CIG units.

Of the Classes 411, 412, 421 and 423 slam-door trains, several complete former SWT units have been preserved.

- Class 411 411198 at Chinnor and Princes Risborough Railway
- Class 412 412311 and 422315 at Eden Valley Railway
- Class 412 412325 at East Kent Railway
- Class 421 421399 at Dartmoor Railway
- Class 421 421497 at Mid-Norfolk Railway
- Class 421 421498 at Epping Ongar Railway
- Class 423 423417 at Bluebell Railway, currently at Strawberry Hill.

In contrast, just two former Southern units have been preserved – one Class 421 and one Class 423. No complete units from South Eastern Trains have been preserved.

Class 121/Class 960 55028 is preserved on the Swanage Railway.

== Liveries ==
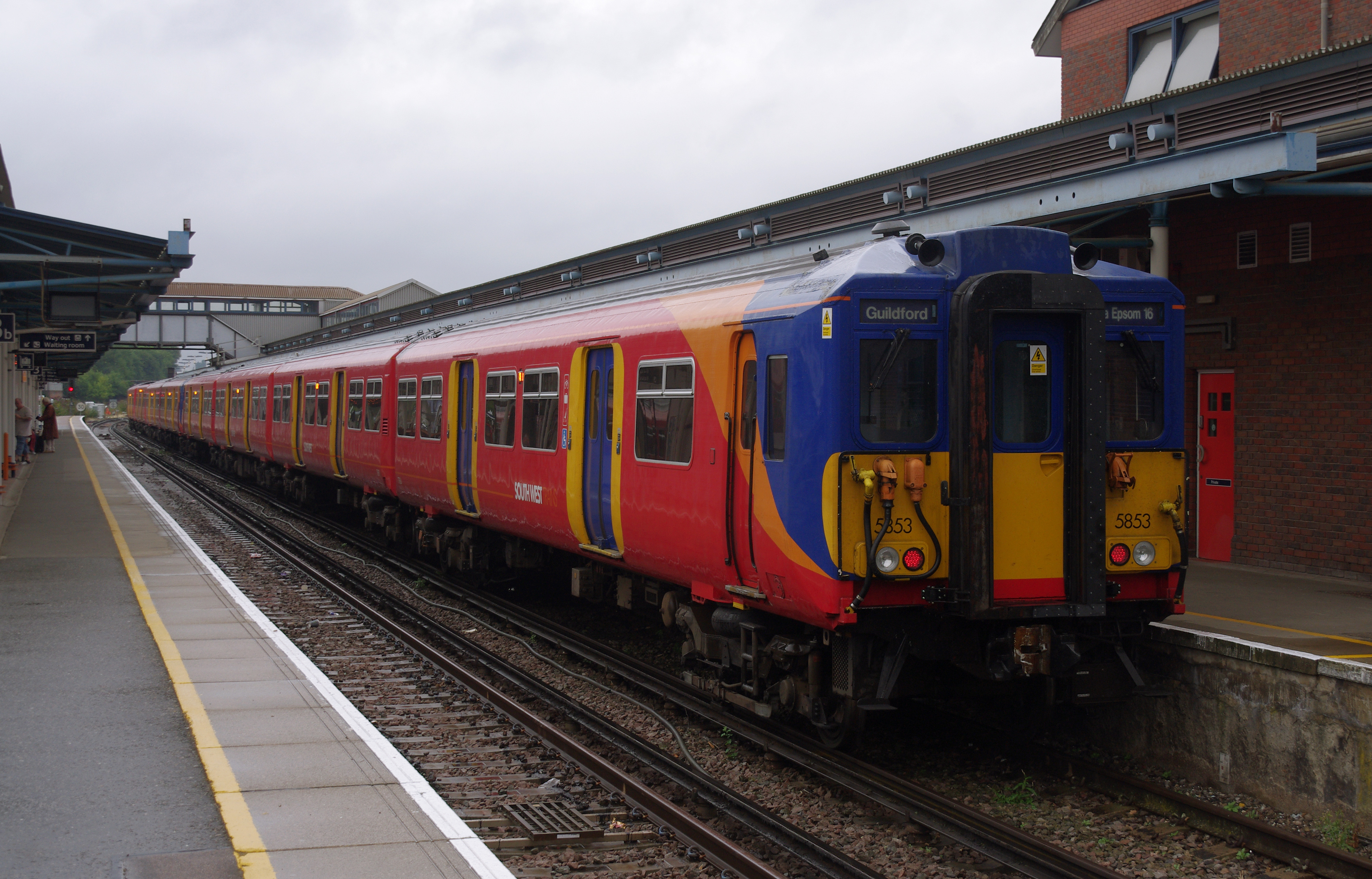
The red livery symbolised short-distance journeys, such as the Hounslow Loop Line.

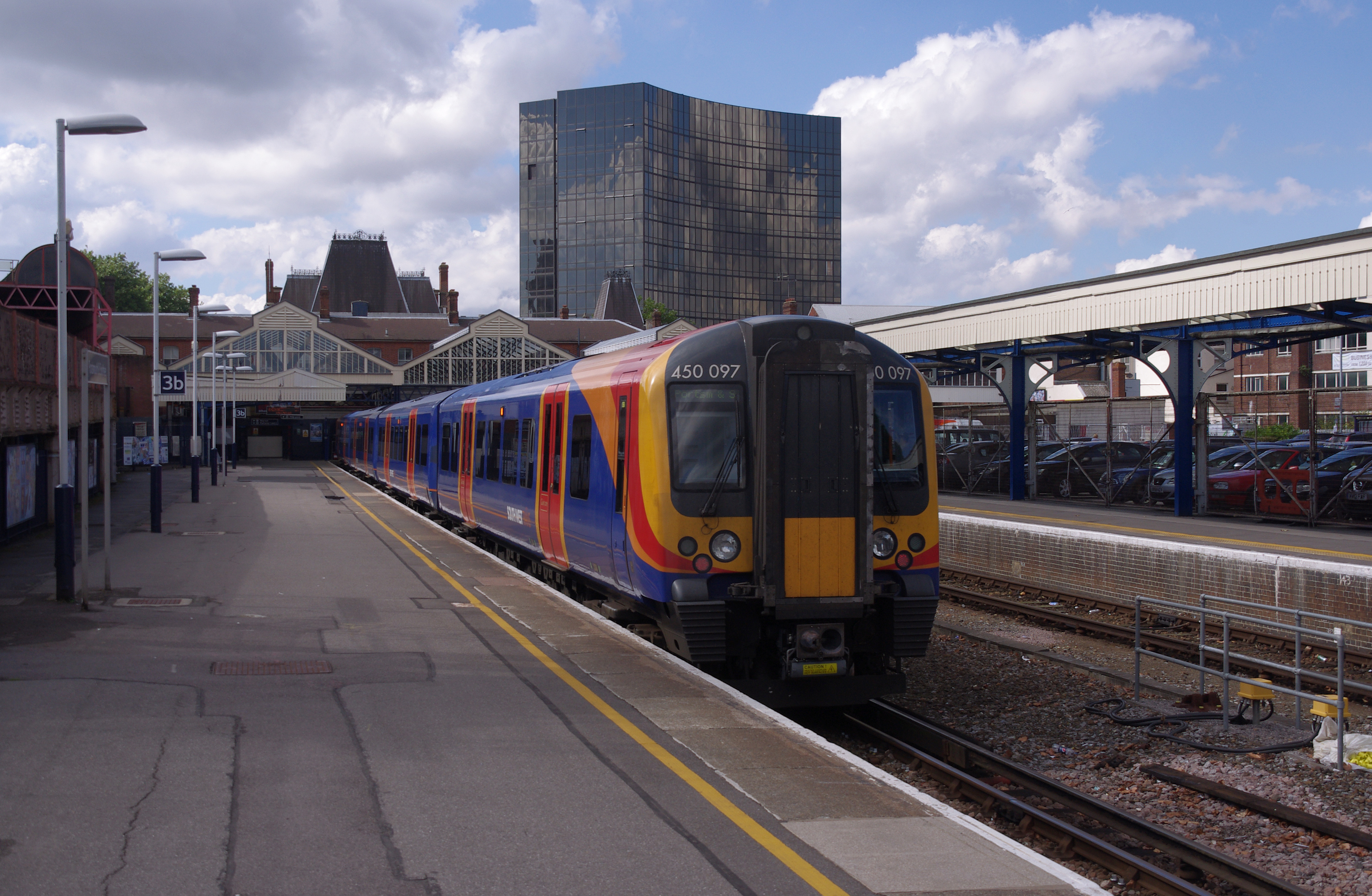
The blue symbolised medium distance services, such as Southampton Central to Portsmouth & Southsea.

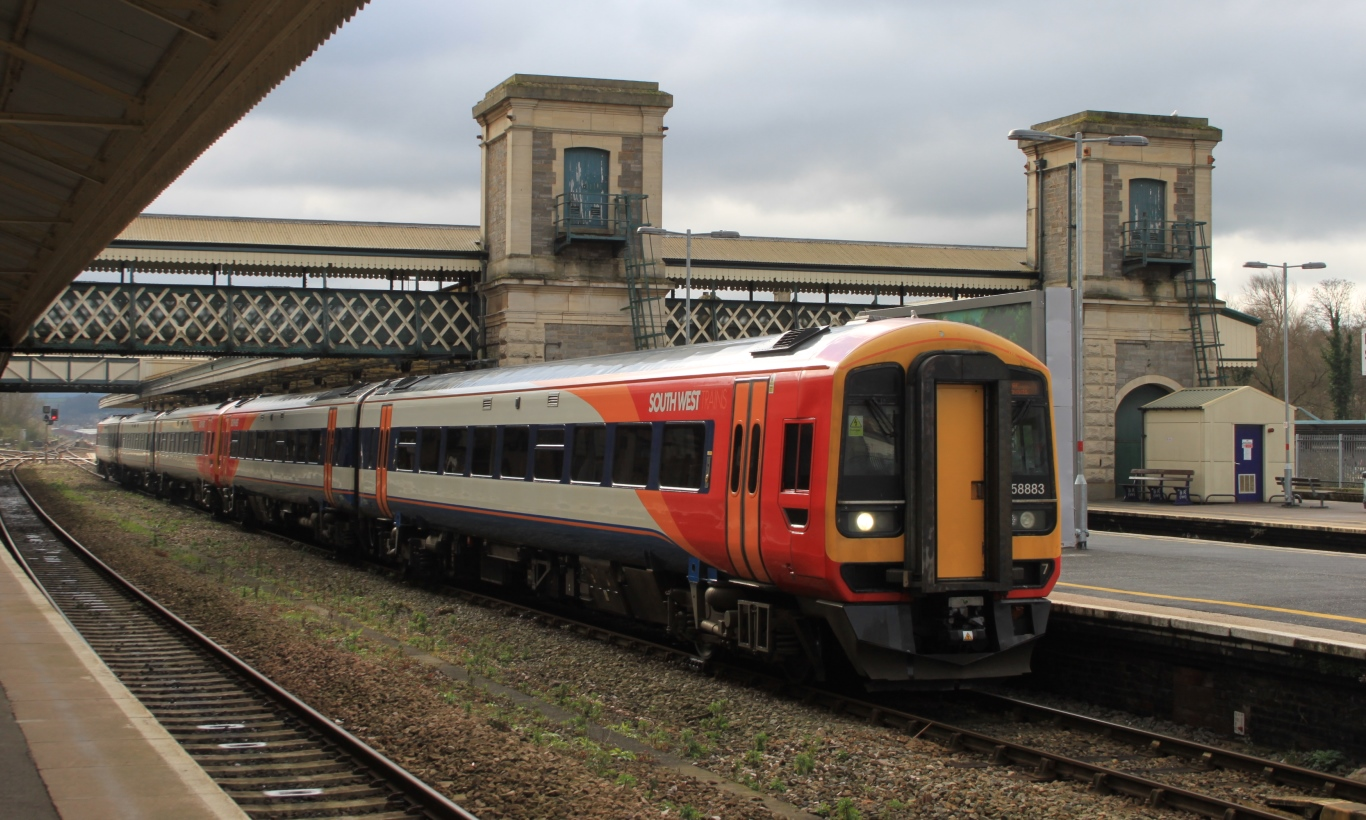
The white symbolised long-distance services, such as London Waterloo to Exeter St Davids.

== Depots ==
=== Wimbledon ===
Wimbledon Traincare depot is located between Wimbledon and Earlsfield stations, on the main line to Waterloo, next to the Wimbledon railway viaduct.

=== Bournemouth ===
Bournemouth depot is southwest of Bournemouth station, occupying the approach to the former Bournemouth West station. Until their withdrawal in February 2007, the depot was home to the Class 442 (5Wes) Wessex Electrics. The branch turns off at Branksome station where trains can be seen stopping at platform 2 and reversing into the depot.

=== Clapham ===
Clapham Junction depot provides stabling for the Desiro fleet.

=== Northam ===
Northam depot was built by Siemens in 2002 as the home depot for the Desiro fleet as part of a 20-year maintenance contract. It is located south of St Denys station and is near Southampton Football Club's St Mary's Stadium.

=== Effingham ===
Located next to Effingham Junction station, the depot is used for the berthing of MPVs (Multipurpose Vehicles). It has two pitted roads and a fuel point.

=== Salisbury ===
Salisbury depot provides servicing for South West Trains' diesel fleet.

=== Fratton ===
Fratton Traincare depot is in central Portsea Island, alongside Fratton station. It has a carriage washer and is the fuelling point for the 158s and 159s. The depot has a train shed with two pitted roads for maintenance of rolling stock. Class 444 and 450 units berth overnight. Stabling sidings and bay platforms at Portsmouth & Southsea station are co-ordinated from the depot.

=== Farnham ===
Farnham depot, in Weydon Lane, was opened by the Southern Railway at the time of the electrification of the Portsmouth and Alton lines in 1937. It was refurbished for the introduction of modern units when slam-door trains were replaced circa 2005. At the same time, disused quarry and ballast dump sidings behind the carriage shed were removed and a number of outdoor sidings were laid for overnight storage and servicing of units.

== See also ==
- Commuter rail in the United Kingdom

Preceded by Network SouthEast; As part of British Rail	Operator of South West franchise 1996–2007	Succeeded by South West Trains; South Western franchise
Preceded by Island Line; Island Line franchise	Operator of South Western franchise 2007–2017	Succeeded by South Western Railway
Preceded by South West Trains; South West franchise	Operator of South Western franchise 2007–2017	Succeeded by South Western Railway
