= Shirley Holms Halt railway station =

Former railway station in England

Coordinates: 50.7827°N 1.5698°W

Shirley Holms Halt was a railway halt in the New Forest district of Hampshire. Opened in 1860 it was closed in 1888 with opening of Sway on the South West Main Line. Said to be one of the first halts in the country, Shirley Holms Halt consisted of a short unstaffed platform. Passengers from the halt had to signal to the engine driver if they wanted to board the train.

Preceding station	Historical railways	Following station
Brockenhurst	Lymington Branch Line	Lymington Town
