= Lymington Station =

Lymington Station may refer to

- Lymington Town railway station
- Lymington Pier railway station
