= Lymington Town =

Lymington Town may refer to:

- Lymington, a town in Hampshire, England
- Lymington Town F.C.
- Lymington Town railway station
