= Ampress Works Halt railway station =

Disused railway station in Lymington, New Forest

Coordinates: 50.7717°N 1.5519°W

Ampress Works Halt
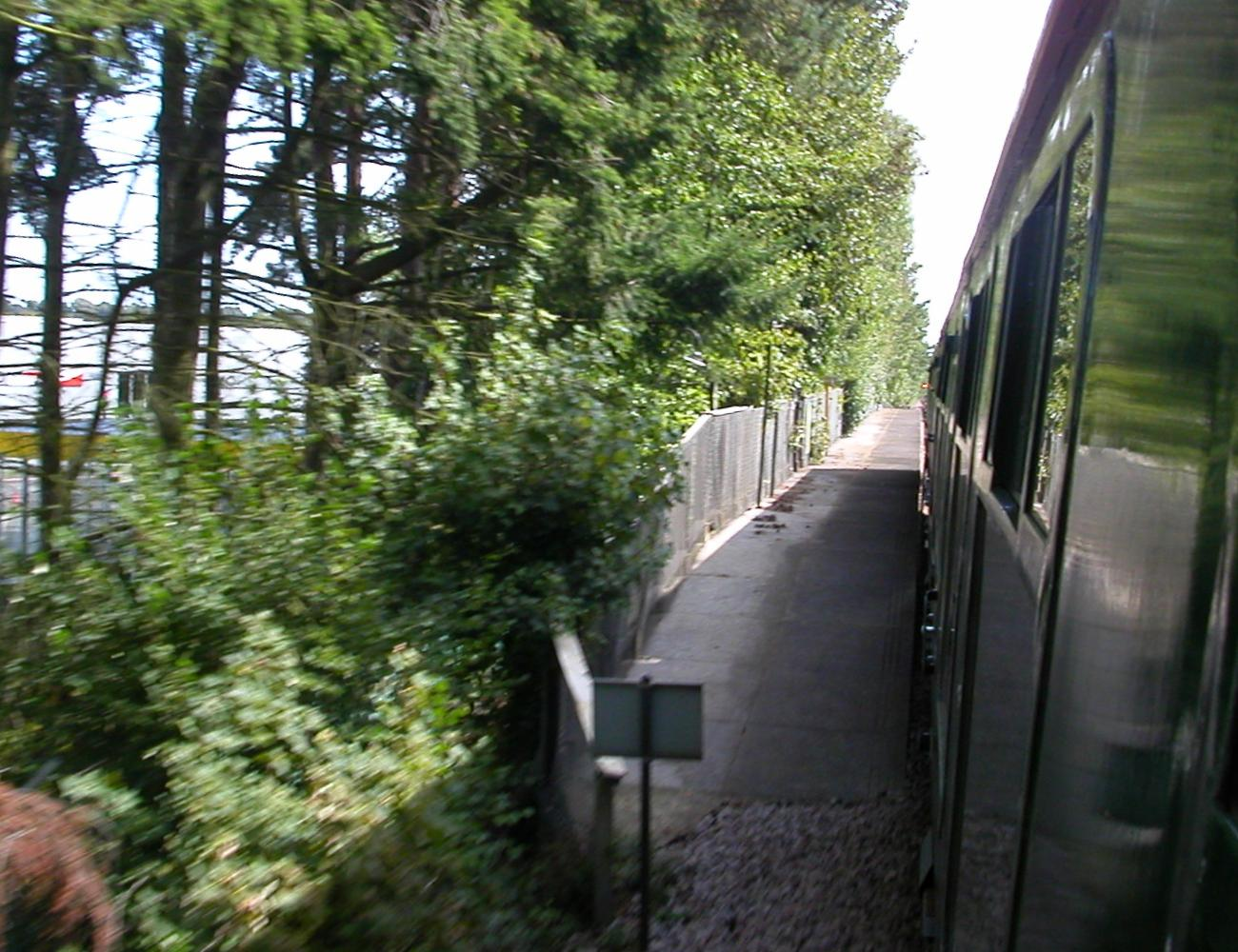
- The former station in 2006

General information
- Location: Lymington, New Forest; England
- Grid reference: SZ316969
- Platforms: 1

Other information
- Status: Disused

History
- Original company: Southern Region of British Railways

Key dates
- 1 October 1956: Station opened as Ampress Works Halt
- By September 1970: Station renamed Ampress
- 1989: Station closed
Location

Ampress Works Halt was a halt station on the Lymington Branch Line which, between 1956 and 1989, served the Wellworthy engineering works near Lymington in Hampshire, England. Sited near the bridge over the A337 Lymington to Brockenhurst road, the station closed when the engineering works ceased operation. The station never appeared in any public timetable.

== History ==
Opened by the Southern Region of British Railways in 1956, the station was served by Network SouthEast from the introduction of sectorisation until its closure. It was situated approximately 1 mile (1.6 km) from Lymington Town station near a bridge over the A337, and it was primarily intended for workers at the nearby Wellworthy factory. Constructed of concrete with chain-link fencing, it never appeared in any timetables and its demise came with the closure of the Wellworthy factory in 1989.

Preceding station	Historical railways	Following station
Brockenhurst	British Rail Southern Region Lymington Branch Line	Lymington Town

== The site today ==
Trains on the electrified Lymington branch line still pass the site. However, as of June 2006 the new Lymington New Forest Hospital is being built on part of the old Wellworthy site, and the town of Lymington has also grown northwards to surround the location. The idea of reopening the halt, which still physically exists, has been discussed.

The station's former sign now hangs on the wall of the train shed at Eastleigh Lakeside Railway at the Lakeside Country Park.

== Sources ==
- Butt, R. V. J. (October 1995). The Directory of Railway Stations: details every public and private passenger station, halt, platform and stopping place, past and present (1st ed.). Sparkford: Patrick Stephens Ltd. ISBN 978-1-85260-508-7. OCLC 60251199. OL 11956311M.
- Jowett, Alan (2000). Jowett's Nationalised Railway Atlas (1st ed.). Penryn, Cornwall: Atlantic Transport Publishers. ISBN 978-0-906899-99-1. OCLC 228266687.
- Station on navigable O.S. map. Station site is south of main road near Ampress Farm
