= Lymington Pier railway station =

Railway station in Hampshire, England

Coordinates: 50.758°N 1.529°W

Lymington Pier
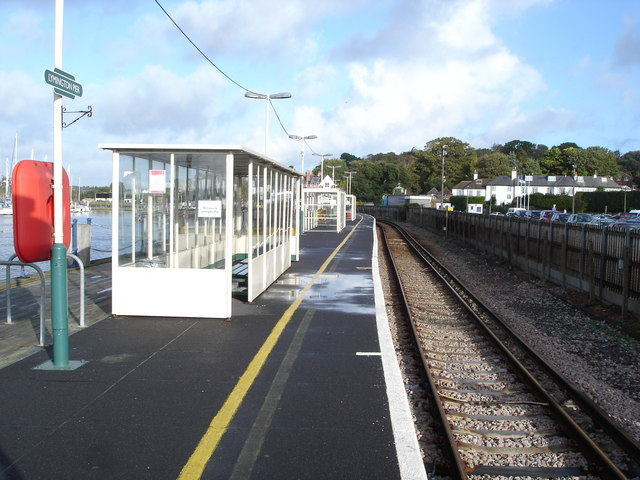

General information
- Location: Lymington, New Forest; England
- Grid reference: SZ332955
- Manager: South Western Railway
- Platforms: 1

Other information
- Station code: LYP
- Classification: DfT category F1

History
- Opened: 1 May 1884

Passengers
- 2020/21: ▼20,976
- 2021/22: ▲75,764
- 2022/23: ▲80,680
- 2023/24: ▲90,772
- 2024/25: ▲0.101 million
Location
Notes
- Passenger statistics from the Office of Rail and Road

Lymington Pier railway station serves the harbour area of Lymington in Hampshire, England. It is 98 miles 15 chains (158.0 km) measured from London Waterloo and is the terminus of the Lymington Branch Line from Brockenhurst and provides a connection with ferry services to Yarmouth on the Isle of Wight. It has one platform.

== Facilities ==
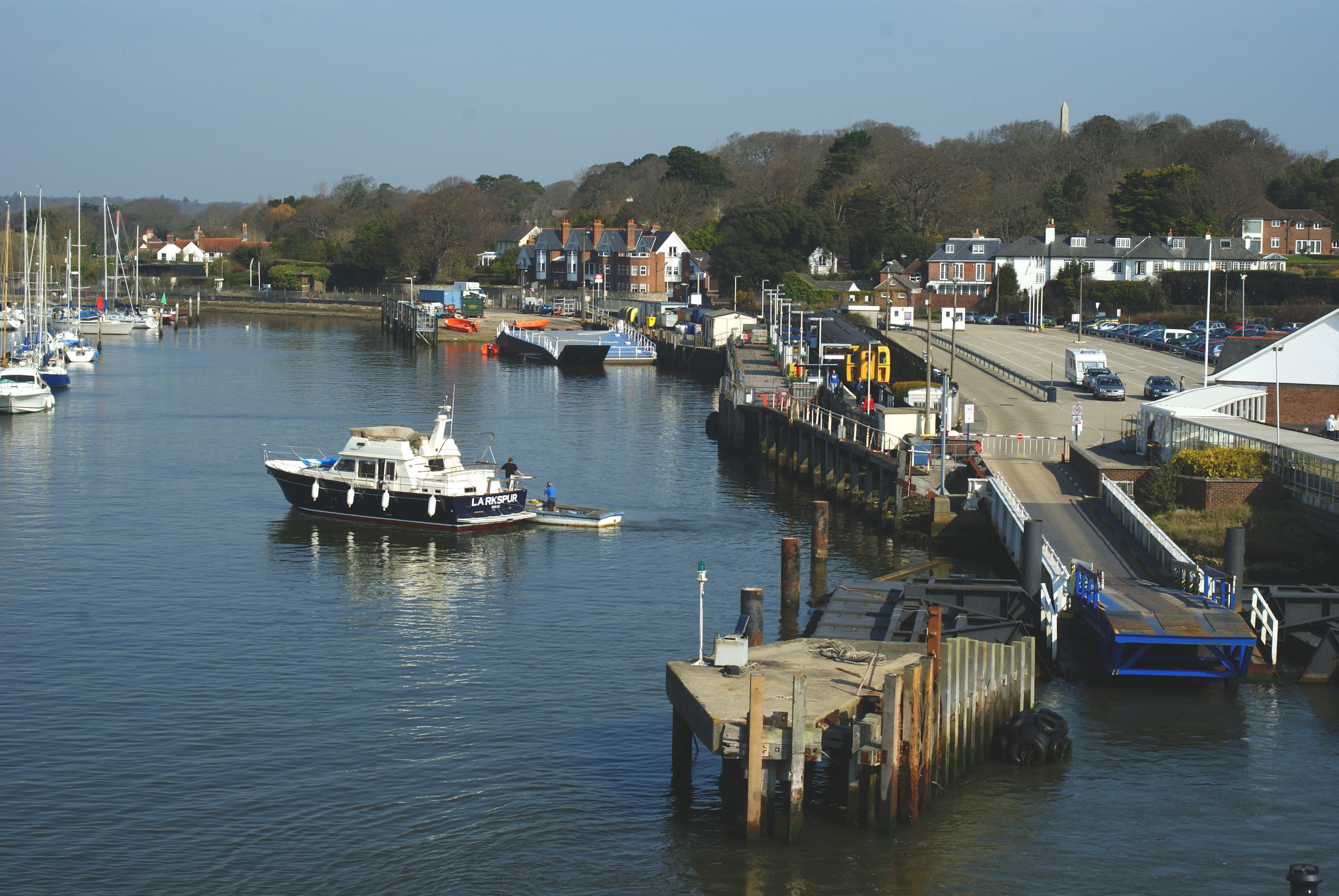
Lymington Pier, Hampshire (2010) by Peter Trimming

The station is unstaffed but has a self-service ticket machine for ticket purchases. There are no toilets at the station although there are toilets available at the nearby Wightlink ferry terminal. The station has a number of passenger shelters as well as information screens and modern help points located on the platform which has step-free access available to it.

== Services ==
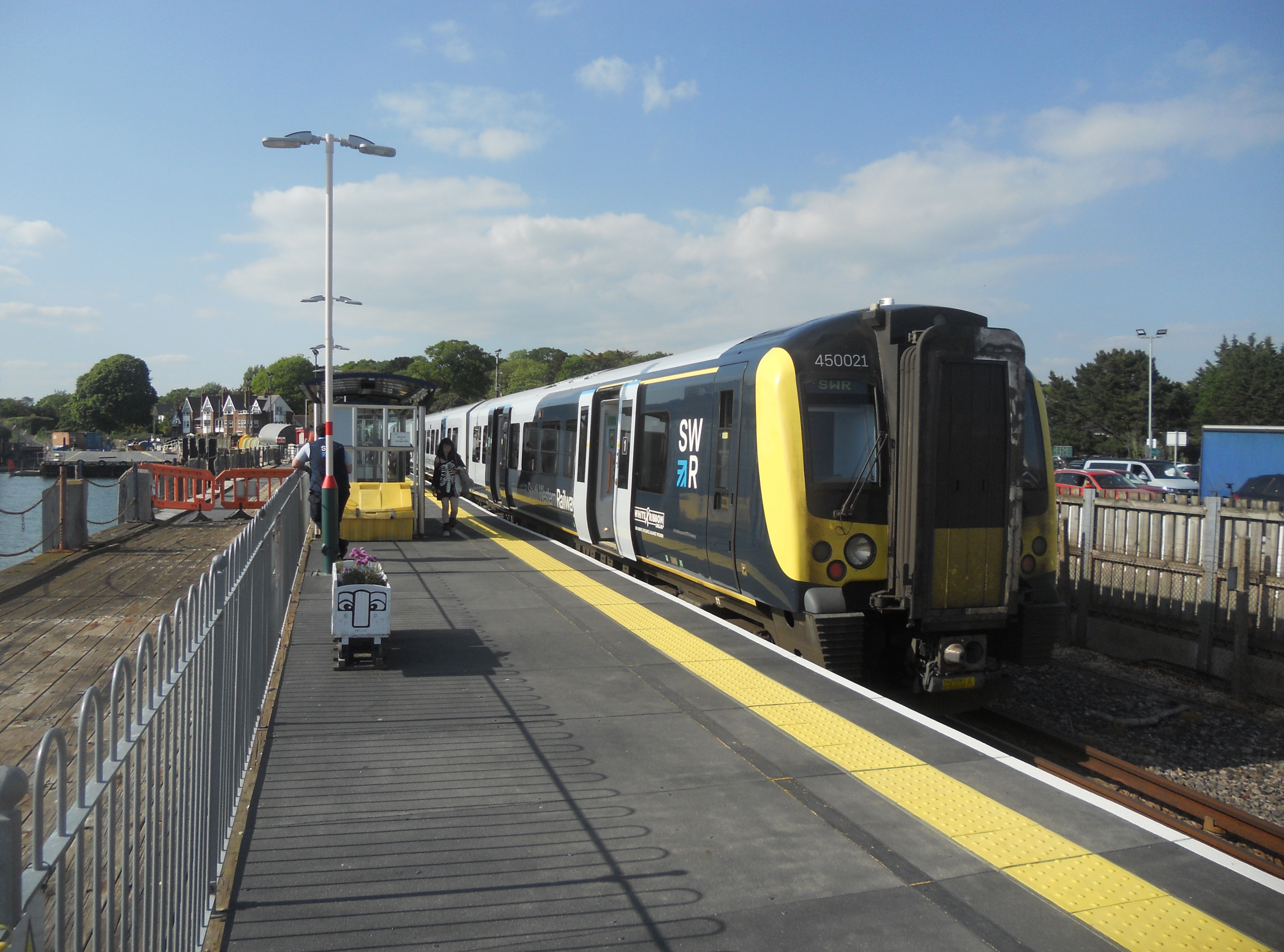
Class 450 unit stands at the platform

All services at Lymington Pier are operated by South Western Railway using Class 450 EMUs.

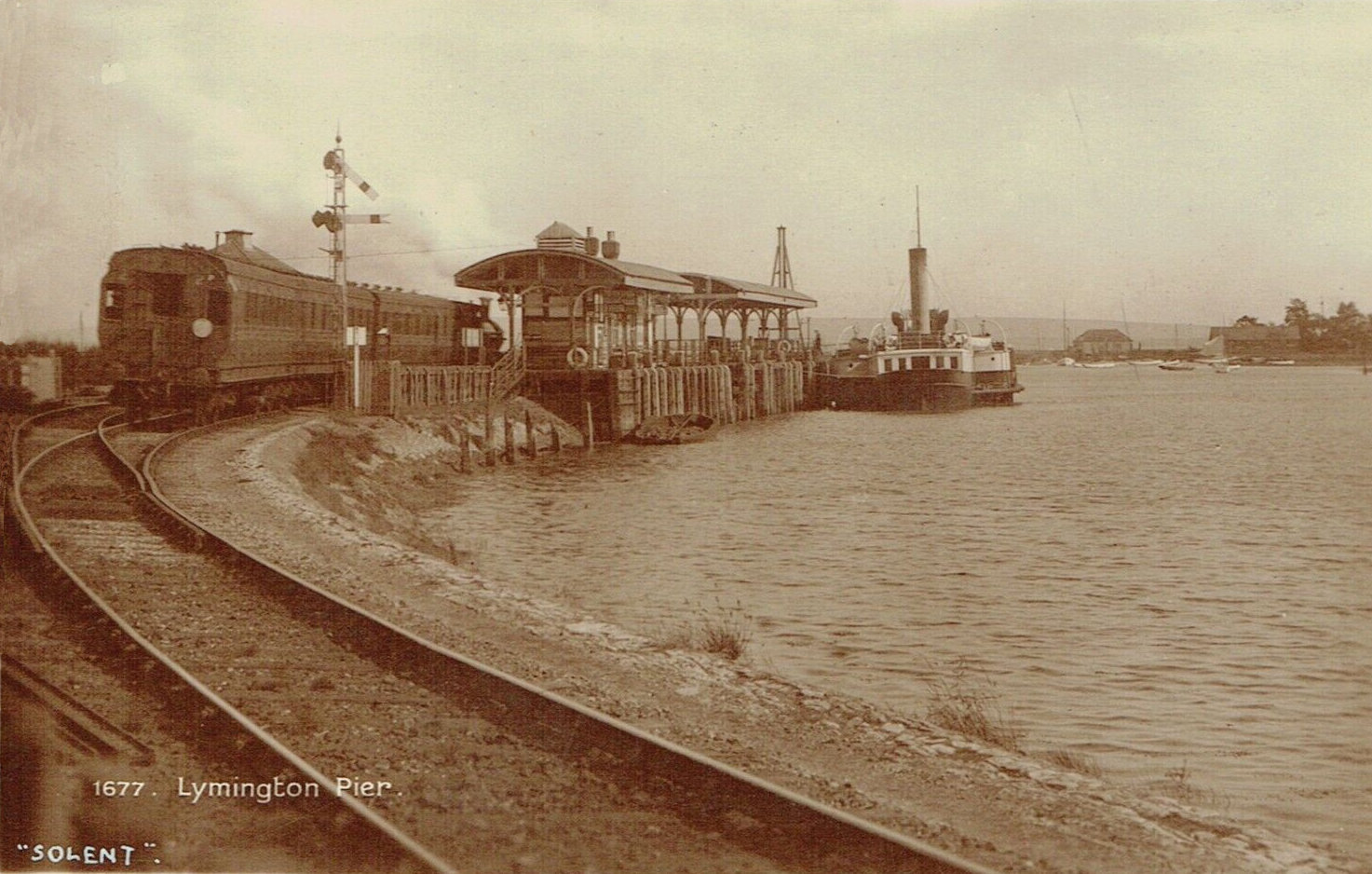
Lymington Pier showing steam train and the passenger ferry Solent with passengers from Yarmouth in the Isle of Wight (1910) postcard

The typical off-peak service in trains per hour is:

- 2 tph to Brockenhurst

Until 22 May 2010, the Lymington Branch Line was operated as a "heritage" service using restored Class 421 4CIG trains.

| Preceding station | National Rail | Following station |
|---|---|---|
| Lymington Town | South Western Railway Lymington Branch Line | Terminus |
| | Ferry services | |
| Terminus | Wightlink (Ferry) | Yarmouth |
