= Lymington branch line =

Railway line in Hampshire, England

Overview
- Status: Operational
- Owner: Network Rail
- Locale: Hampshire; South East England
- Termini: Brockenhurst; Lymington Pier

Service
- Type: Suburban rail, Heavy rail
- System: National Rail
- Operator: South Western Railway
- Rolling stock: Class 450 Desiro

Technical
- Track gauge: 1,435 mm (4 ft 8 1/2 in) standard gauge
- Operating speed: 50 miles per hour
Route map
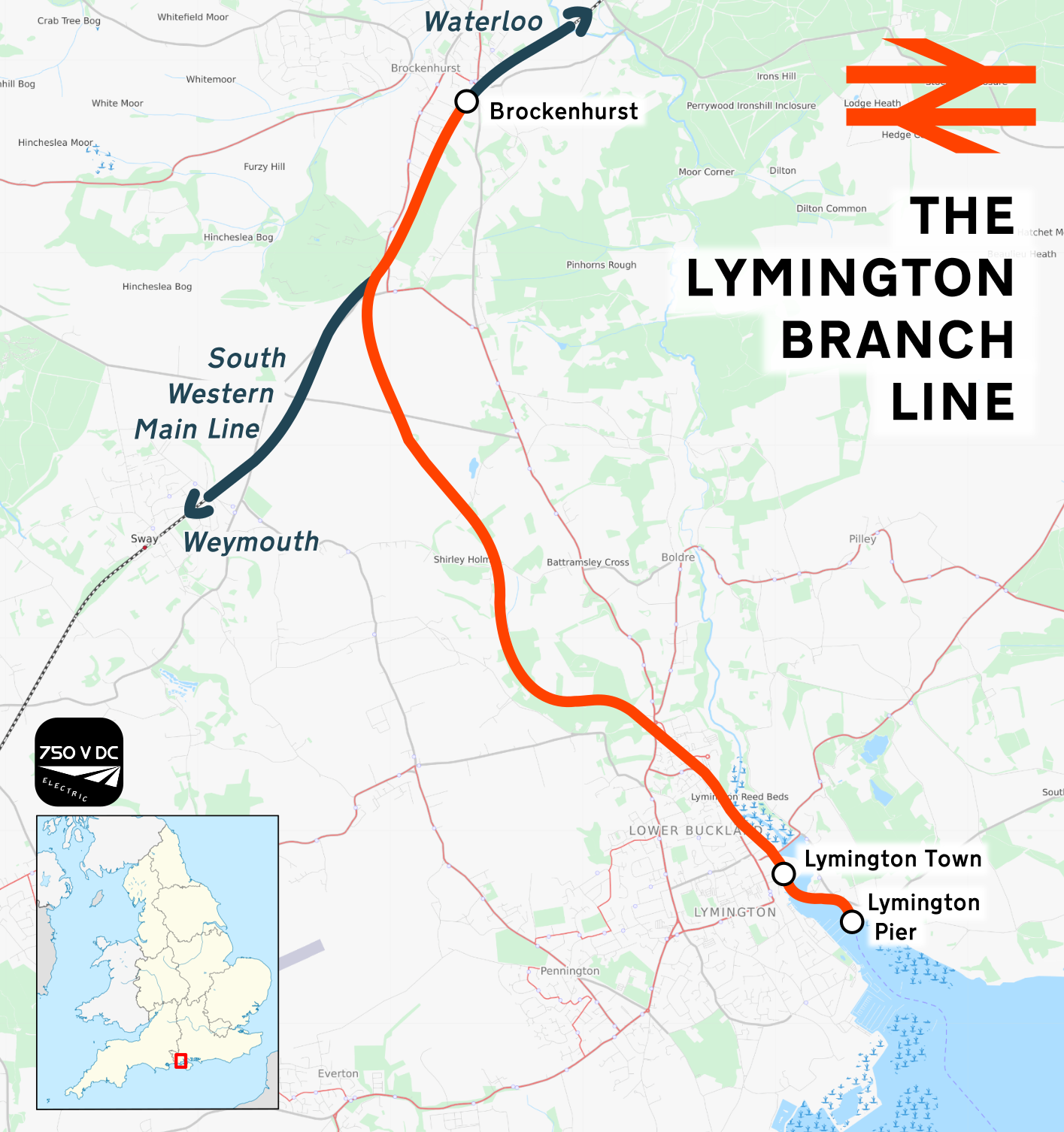
(Click to expand)

The Lymington branch line is a railway that runs from Brockenhurst to Lymington in the New Forest, England. The line is around 5.6 miles (9 km) long, and is single track throughout its length. At Lymington Pier, trains connect with Wightlink ferry services to Yarmouth, Isle of Wight. The Lymington branch line is electrified using the 750 V DC third-rail system.

The line was opened as far as Lymington in 1858. The London and South Western Railway bought out the local company in 1879, and in 1884 the LSWR opened a short extension of the line to Lymington Pier. The economy of Lymington had been in decline but the local economy improved in the twentieth century. The line was electrified in 1967. A half-hourly shuttle passenger service operates at present (2023).

== History ==
=== First attempt ===
The Southampton and Dorchester Railway opened its main line in 1847; from Southampton it ran to Brockenhurst, but then took a northerly path through Ringwood and Wimborne; the present-day main line from Brockenhurst to Poole was not ready as a through route until 1888. In 1846, during construction, the Southampton and Dorchester Railway proposed a branch line from Brockenhurst to Lymington, and it obtained authorisation by the Southampton and Dorchester Railway (Lymington and Eling Branches) Act 1847 (10 & 11 Vict. c. xcvi), of 2 July 1847. A salt works at Lymington had promised 250,000 tons of salt annually as a revenue earning goods flow. However the scarcity of investment money following the collapse of the Railway Mania meant that it proved impossible to raise funds for any construction, and the scheme did not proceed.

=== Lymington Railway Company ===
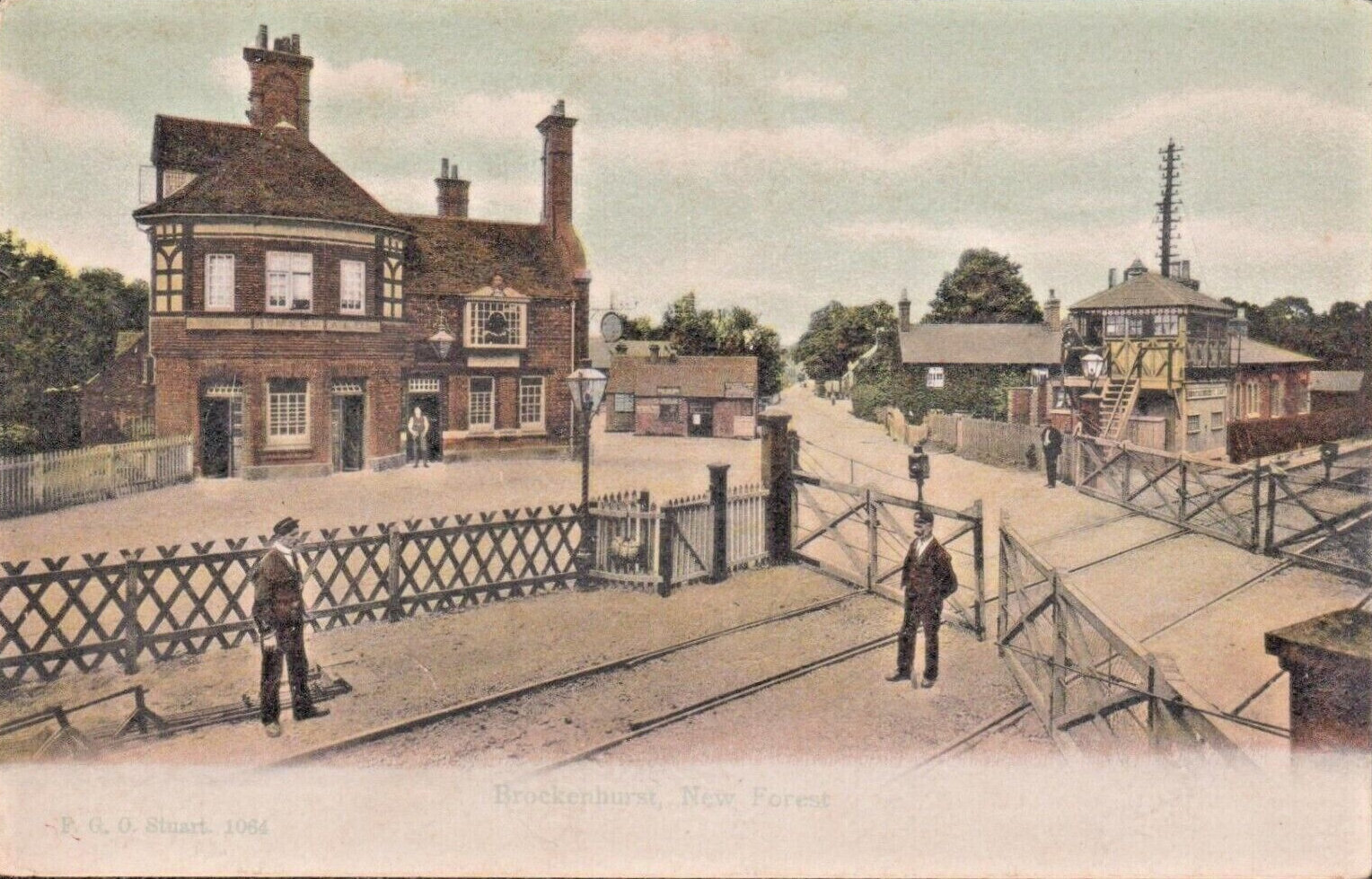
Lymington Road level crossing at Brockenhurst station

Nine years later, an independent Lymington Railway Company was promoted to build a similar line, and it was incorporated by the Lymington Railway Act 1856 (19 & 20 Vict. c. lxxi) of 7 July 1856, with share capital of £21,000. The company was authorised to purchase Lymington Town Quay and the Town Bridge, and to build a jetty. The line was to be built as far as the present-day Lymington Town station.

The line was four miles in length and it was constructed quickly, and on 8 May 1858 a celebratory train service was run for local people, probably free of charge. (Note: It would have been illegal to operate a public commercial passenger service at this stage, although this was not infrequently done by local companies.) It was well patronised. The Board of Trade inspecting officer, Colonel Yolland, made an inspection on 11 May 1858 and was satisfied. However the London and South Western Railway was to work the line, and it required some track improvements before it would start operations: the sleepers had been installed at a pitch of 43 inches (1,100 mm) and the LSWR, who would be responsible for day to day track maintenance, insisted on the standard 36 inches (910 mm). After this work was done, the line opened to passenger traffic on 12 July 1858; goods traffic probably started on 23 July 1858.

The LSWR declined to operate ferries to Isle of Wight; they had a non-competitive agreement with the London Brighton and South Coast Railway, but the Solent Sea Steam Packet Company made four return trips from Lymington to Yarmouth every weekday, as well as other daily transits. A coach operated from Yarmouth to Freshwater. A shareholders' meeting on 12 August 1858 was told by the company chairman, Alfred Mew, that the company "was more promising of success than had ever been counted on"; another director stated that the LSWR's chairman, vice-chairman and two of the directors had come down to see what the Lymington Company was doing.

Lymington Railway Act 1859
- Act of Parliament
- Parliament of the United Kingdom
- Long title: An Act for authorizing the Lymington Railway Company to acquire the Ferry across the Lymington River, and to raise further Capital; and for other Purposes.
- Citation: 22 & 23 Vict. c. xv

Dates
- Royal assent: 21 July 1859

A further act of Parliament, the Lymington Railway Act 1859 (22 & 23 Vict. c. xv), was secured on 21 July 1859 authorising £11,800 of additional capital, and acquisition of the river ferry crossing the Lymington River at Boldre, about three miles (5km) from the terminus (and not immediately adjacent to the railway).

The company's financial performance was not so rosy as forecast; in February 1861 the shareholders' meeting was told that net profit for the half year was £375. (Note: Equal to 2.2% annual on the share capital, but there were probably heavy interest payments due.) In 1859 the Portsmouth Direct line had opened, substantially shortening the distance from London to Portsmouth, and therefore to the Isle of Wight. This removed some of the advantage the Lymington route had enjoyed up to that point. In fact Lymington was in decline throughout the early life of the line, the salt industry in particular suffering because of competition from cheaper extractive action in Cheshire. Shirley Holms station was opened on 10 October 1860, but local people found Sway station, about 2 miles (3.2 km) away on the new main line to be more convenient after opening in 1888.

=== Absorbed by the LSWR ===
The line had been worked by the LSWR company from the outset, and it agreed to purchase the Lymington Railway Company's line; this was done under the terms of the South Western Railway (General) Act 1860 (23 & 24 Vict. c. clxxxv) of 6 August 1860 and took effect on 21 March 1879. The local company had paid a dividend of 3.5% in 1877. An urgent task for the LSWR after the takeover was the renewal of many of the underbridges on the line.

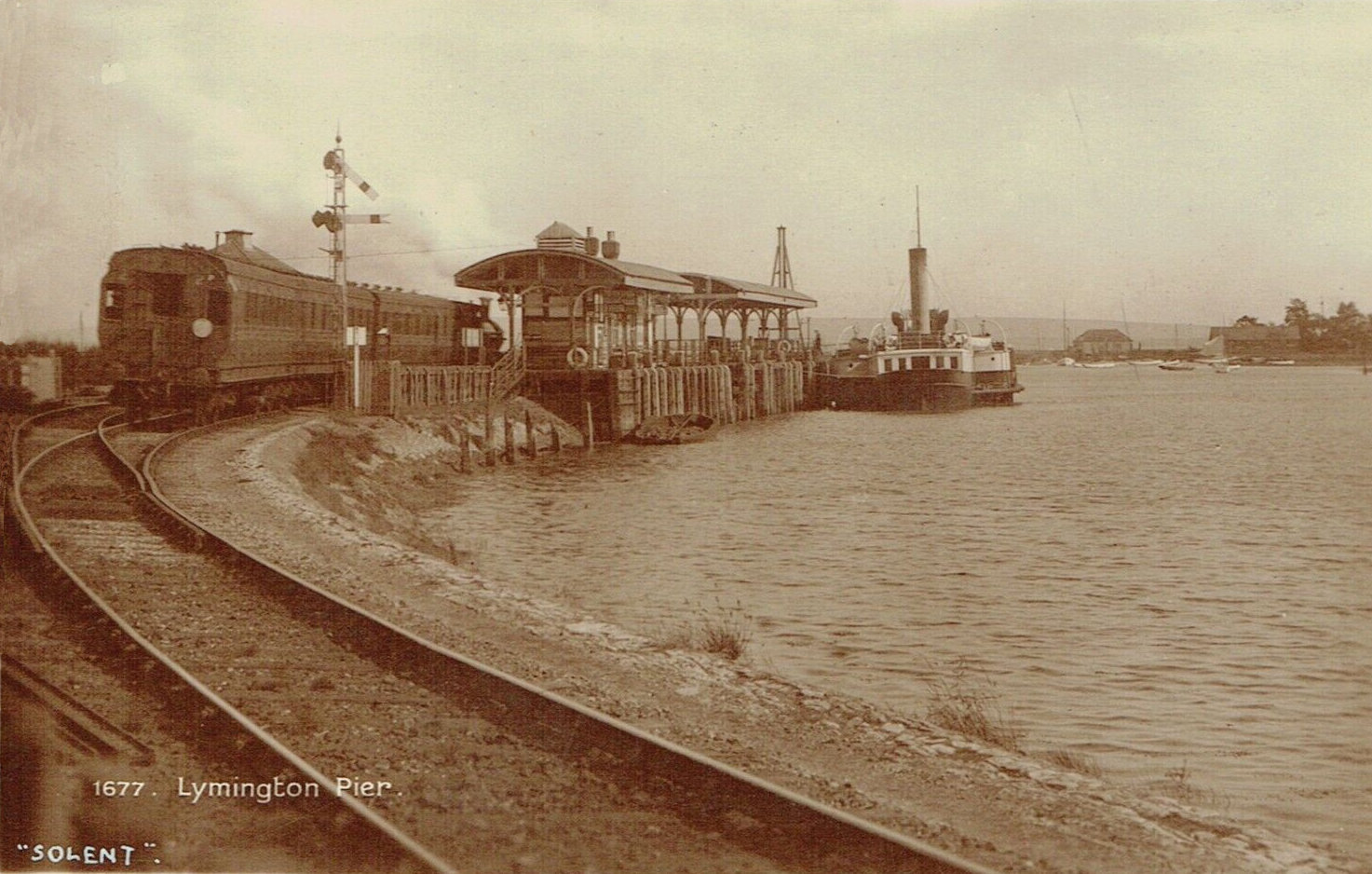
Lymington Pier railway station with paddle steamer waiting

The berth at Lymington was cramped and often congested with commercial traffic and the footway from there to the station was lengthy. Moreover at low tide the steamers could not come alongside and passengers had to be taken out to the ferries in tenders. The Freshwater, Yarmouth and Newport Railway was granted its authorising act of Parliament, the Freshwater, Yarmouth and Newport Railway Act 1880 (43 & 44 Vict. c. clxxxvi), in 1880, and this encouraged the LSWR to plan improvements to the Lymington side of the Solent. Authorisation was obtained on 22 August 1881 to extend the line for 34 chains (690m), crossing the estuary to a new Pier station, where ships could berth at any state of the tide. The extension and Pier station opened on 1 May 1884; four trains from London connected daily with steamers, and a cargo steamer operated daily in connection.

After 1 July 1884 the LSWR acquired the Solent Sea Steam Packet Company's paddleships Mayflower and Solent as well as several cargo boats, for £2,750.

The fortunes of the branch line and the ferry services had been limited for many years, in part because of the LSWR's preference for its own Isle of Wight services via Portsmouth. Now that Lymington was completely in the LSWR's hands, the line's use flourished.

=== The 20th century ===
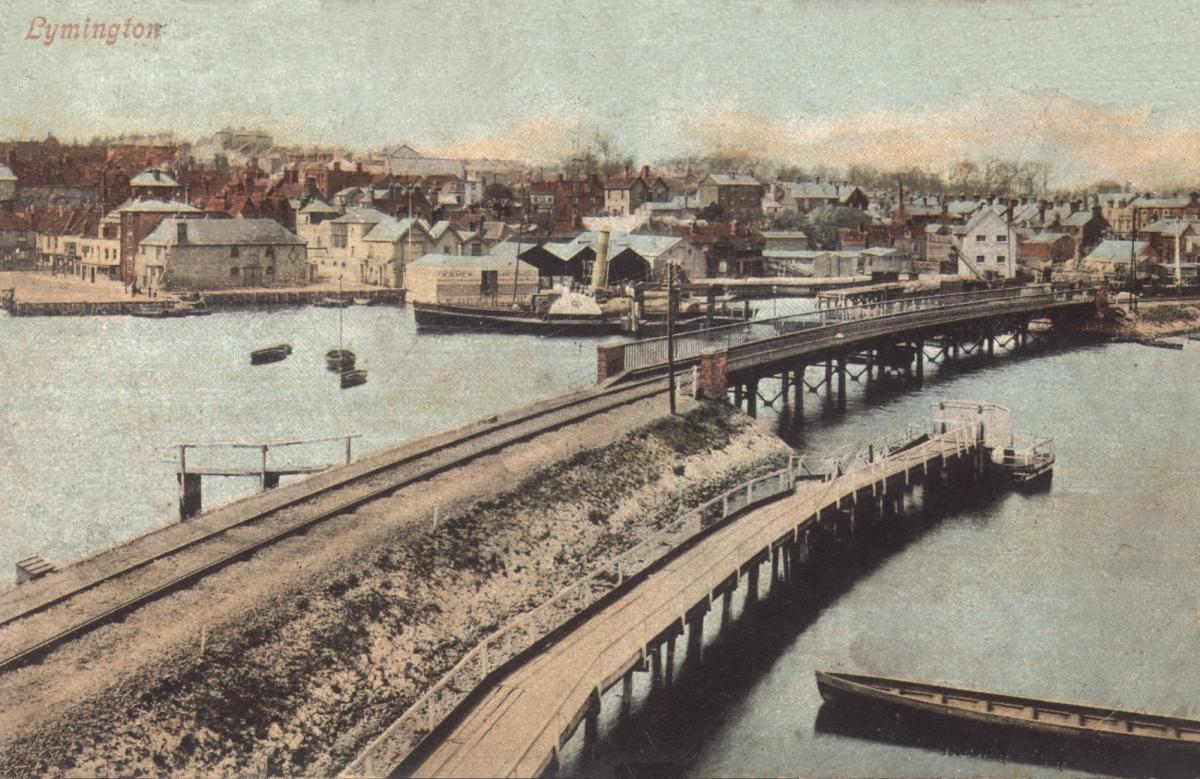
Lymington and the railway extension to Lymington Pier

Independent promoters developed a scheme to tunnel to the Isle of Wight. They floated a company named the South Western and Isle of Wight Junction Railway, incorporated by an act of Parliament, the South Western and Isle of Wight Junction Railway Act 1901 (1 Edw. 7. c. xcix) of 26 July 1901. It had authorised share capital of £600,000 to build a 2 1/2 mile (4km) Solent tunnel, and 7 3/4 miles (12km) of railway linking the Lymington branch and the Freshwater, Yarmouth and Newport Railway between Freshwater and Yarmouth. The tunnel would be operated by electric traction. Running powers were sought over the LSWR to Brockenhurst and over the FY&NR and the Isle of Wight Central Railway. The scheme required the co-operation and more particularly the financial support of the LSWR, but negotiations for a working agreement were conducted fruitlessly for several years. Some aspects of the scheme were abstractive from LSWR revenue and were obviously unwelcome. In 1921 the scheme was allowed to fade away.

The LSWR proceeded with some modernisation of its maritime fleet on the Lymington route, and on 1 May 1902 a new saloon paddler Solent was handed over. The old Mayflower of 1866 was sold in June 1905 for only £50. A cargo boat Carrier was purchased on 6 February 1906; she was a 36-ton twin-screw vessel of wide beam. She provided a large deck for motor cars, which were increasingly using the Lymington route as the easiest crossing to the Isle of Wight.

In 1938 the pier at Lymington was reconstructed and made suitable for car ferry operation; the slipway was extended at the cost of the Admiralty in 1942.

An engineering company named Wellworth had a factory alongside the line, and a halt to serve it, named Ampress Works Halt was opened on 1 October 1956; trains ceased to call there after May 1977 when the factory closed.

In Southern Railway days boat trains up to ten coaches in length were run from Waterloo to Lymington Pier, but the oridinary service was generally operated by M7 tank locomotives operating pull and push trains. After 1964 the traction was usually ex-LMS 2-6-2T or BR standard 2-6-4T locomotives.

In 1967, the Brockenhurst to Lymington Pier branch line was the last steam-hauled branch on the British Railways system. The last passenger train ran on Sunday 2 April 1967 behind LMS Ivatt Class 2 2-6-2T tank engine 41312, whistling the rhythm of Yellow Submarine all the way to Lymington Town station. Ordinarily the last train of the day terminated at Lymington Town and berthed there overnight. On the final run the locomotive ran round its train at Lymington Town and the train returned empty to Brockenhurst. This was the last ever run-round of the coaches by a steam engine on a UK branch line in regular service. Locomotive 41312 is now preserved on the Watercress Line. A three-car diesel electric multiple unit operated the branch passenger service for some time after the end of steam working.

A new car ferry terminal was opened on the south side of the Pier station in January 1976.

=== Electrification and infrastructure changes ===
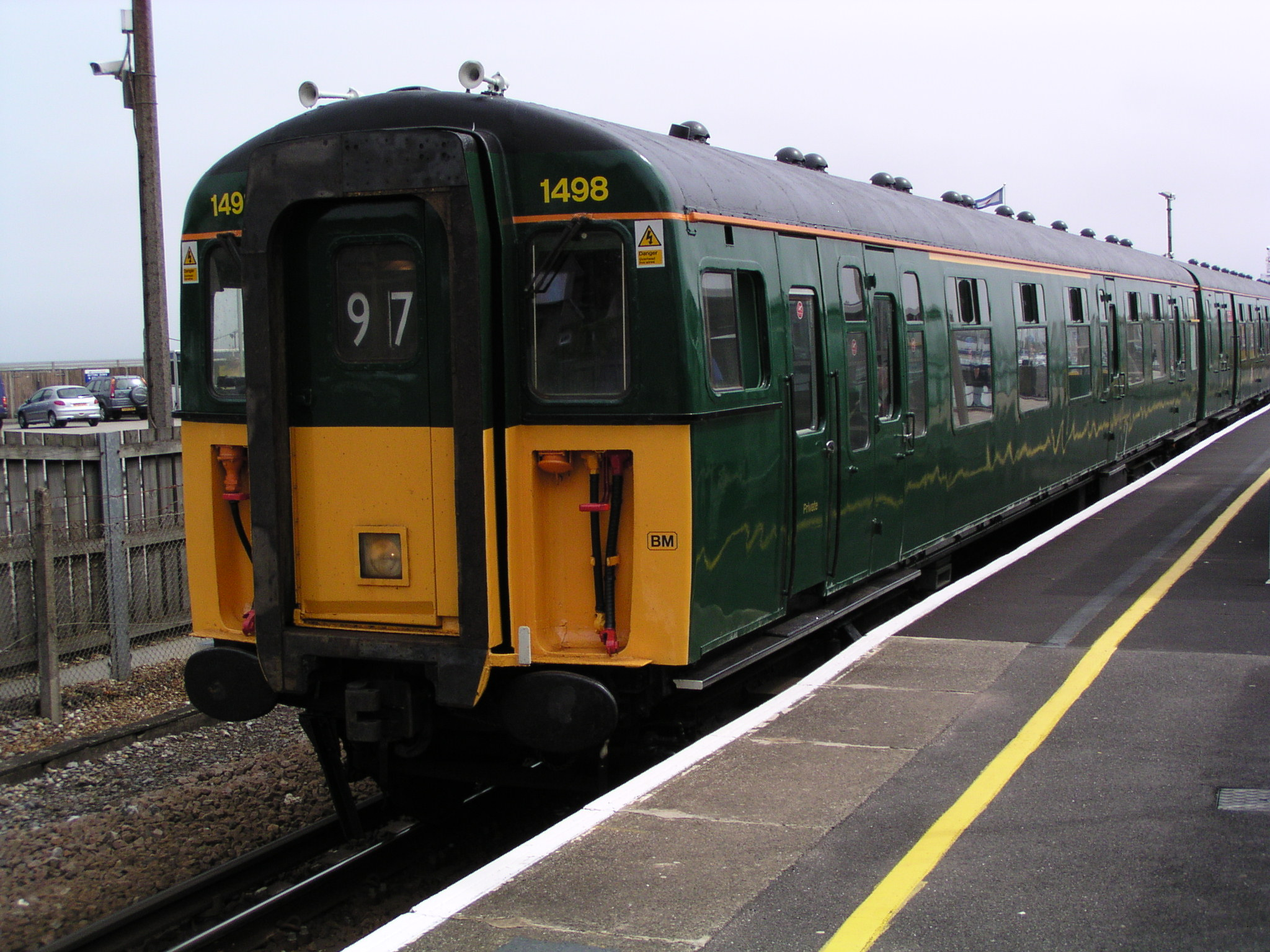
Restored 3Cig unit no. 1498 "Farringford" at Lymington Pier on 26 May 2005. This unit was repainted in 1960s-era British Railways green livery and was withdrawn on 22 May 2010.

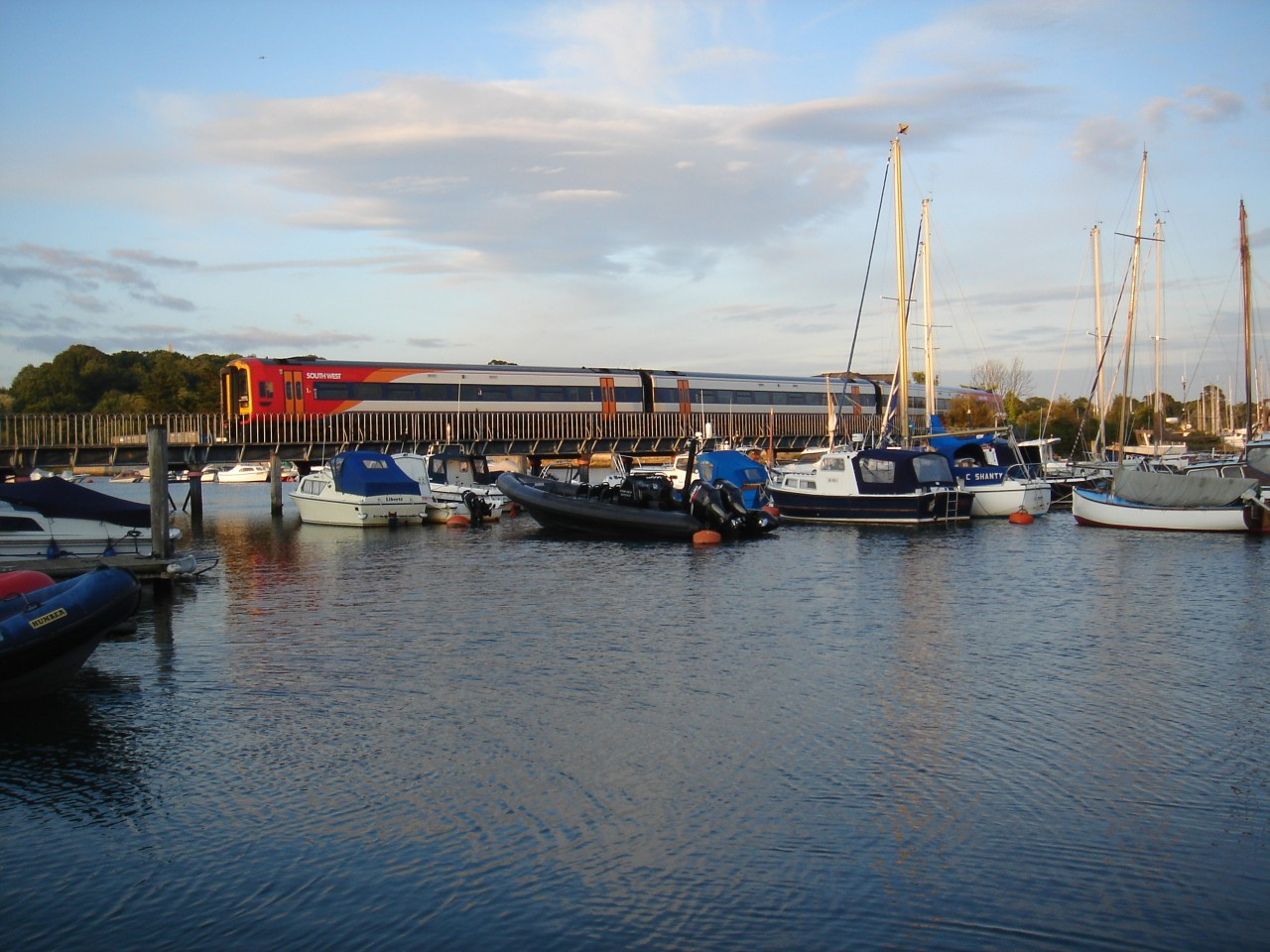
South West Trains 159008 replacing the heritage units on the Lymington branch line on 17 July 2009

The Lymington branch from Brockenhurst to Lymington was electrified on 2 January 1967. Power was supplied at 750V DC on the third rail system. An independent single branch line alongside the down main line between Brockenhurst and Lymington junction was provided when a new signal centre was opened at Brockenhurst from June 1978. The first train to use new alignment ran on 20 October 1978, after the derailment of a tamping machine prevented planned operation on the previous day.

=== Locations ===
- Brockenhurst; Southampton and Dorchester main line station; opened 1 June 1847;
- Lymington Junction;
- Shirley Holms; opened 10 October 1860; closed 6 March 1888; sometimes spelt Shirley Holmes;
- Ampress Works; opened 1 October 1956; last trains called 6 October 1989;
- Lymington Town; opened 12 July 1858; temporary station; extended about 200 yards to permanent station 19 September 1860; renamed Lymington Town1 May 1884; still open;
- Lymington Pier; opened 1 May 1884; closed 5 October 1992; reopened 22 November 1992; closed 8 January 1996; reopened 18 February 1996; still open.

== Traction ==
Early locomotives used on the line were 2-4-0WT No. 143 "Nelson" and No. 176 "Southampton". In the 1870s a Hercules class 2-4-0 named "Taurus" was used. As a shed was yet to be built at Lymington, it was stabled in the open. C14 class 2-2-0T No. 744 and a trailer worked the branch in 1907, and S14 class 0-4-0Ts worked push and pull trains in 1910 and were capable of hauling two fully laden trailers. In 1911 O2 class 0-4-4Ts returned. By about 1918 some Adams and Drummond 0-4-4Ts were converted for push-pull working; the driver, when in the control compartment of the leading coach, worked the locomotive by a system of wires and pulleys. After July 1930 this basic control system was changed to the compressed air system that had been developed on the London, Brighton and South Coast Railway, fitted to Drummond 0-4-4T engines.

The Lymington branch was the last to be worked by BR steam, which operated until 2 April 1967. Hampshire DEMUs took over for a few weeks to enable the redundant run-round loops and engine shed line to be safely lifted. Some electric trains began on 2 June 1967 and from 26 June all services were EMU worked. On 22 May 2010, the last two slam door 3CIG class EMUs were withdrawn and replaced with Class 158 DMUs Monday to Friday and Class 450 EMUs at weekends.

== LSWR buses ==
On 19 July 1905 the LSWR started a bus service from Lymington to New Milton, operated by Clarkson steam buses. A paraffin fuelled boiler was used to produce steam at 300 lbs per square inch (21 bar) to drive a 32 horsepower (24 kW) engine. In 1906 the Clarkson company fitted them with the latest type of water tube boiler. A luxurious touch was that the eighteen and twenty-seater saloons were heated in winter.

== Services ==
The only train service on this line is operated by South Western Railway; it runs every half-hour between Brockenhurst and Lymington Pier. The headcode on this service was 97.

There is no through service to any other lines.

== Rolling stock ==
Services on the line are currently operated by South Western Railway using stock based at Bournemouth depot. Previously, rolling stock had been restricted to Classes 411, 412, 421 and 423.

Following the withdrawal of slamdoor stock from the rest of the South West Trains network in 2005, it was expected that the operation of the line would have been taken over by the new Class 450 "Desiro" units. However, SWT considered that due to the self-contained nature of the branch it would be more cost effective to continue Mark 1 operation. On this basis SWT bought and refurbished two British Rail Class 421 units to exclusively operate services on the line. Work carried out on the units included the fitting of central door locking and other safety features to allow them to remain in service beyond the November 2005 deadline for the withdrawal of slam-door stock. The final two units of this type to work the line were numbered 1497 and 1498 and officially named Freshwater and Farringford respectively at a ceremony at Brockenhurst station on 12 May 2005. They were also repainted into an approximation of their original liveries. The "heritage" service commenced on 12 May 2005 and an exemption was obtained to enable the use of the 3Cig units until 2013, at which point they were considered to be life expired.

A Lymington Flyer headboard was made by Malcolm Ellis of Parkstone station, for use on the slam-door stock by local traincrew.

In Summer 2009 South West Trains announced plans to replace the heritage EMUs with more modern units; Class 158 Sprinters on weekdays and Class 450 at weekends; the latter were also used on occasion when the 3Cigs were unavailable, initially with the fourth carriage locked out of use because of the short platform at Lymington Town). This change took place on 23 May 2010, with the final 3Cig service departing from Lymington Pier on 22 May 2010.

Unit No.		Class	Type	Unit Name	Livery	Dates in Service		Disposal
New	Previous	Class	Type	Unit Name	Livery	From	To	Disposal
1199	2326	411	3Cep	Lucy	South West Trains	01/2003	06/2004	Scrapped at Immingham RFT in 07/2004.
1198	2314	411	3Cep	Linda	South West Trains	06/2004	12/2004	Preserved on Dartmoor Railway in 01/2005, then at Pontypool & Blaenavon Railway, moved to Chinnor & Princes Risborough Railway in 08/2013.
1499	1394	421	3Cig	Lisa	South West Trains	12/2004	05/2005	Preserved on Dean Forest Railway in 07/2005. Scrapped at C.F Booth, Rotherham 2013.
1497	1883	421	3Cig	Freshwater	BR Blue/Grey	05/2005	22/05/10	Preserved, for use on The Mid Norfolk Railway. Later sold to The Spa Valley Railway.
1498	1888	421	3Cig	Farringford	BR Green	05/2005	22/05/10	Preserved, for use on Epping Ongar Railway. Later sold to Quirky Nights Glamping Village in County Sligo, Ireland.
-	-	158	-	-	South West Trains	23/05/10	12/2018	No longer used on branch.
-	-	450	4Des	-	South Western Railway	23/05/10	-	In Service

Key:
In service
Preserved
Scrapped
Withdrawn
