= Lymington Town railway station =

Railway station in the Hampshire, England

Coordinates: 50.761°N 1.537°W

Lymington Town
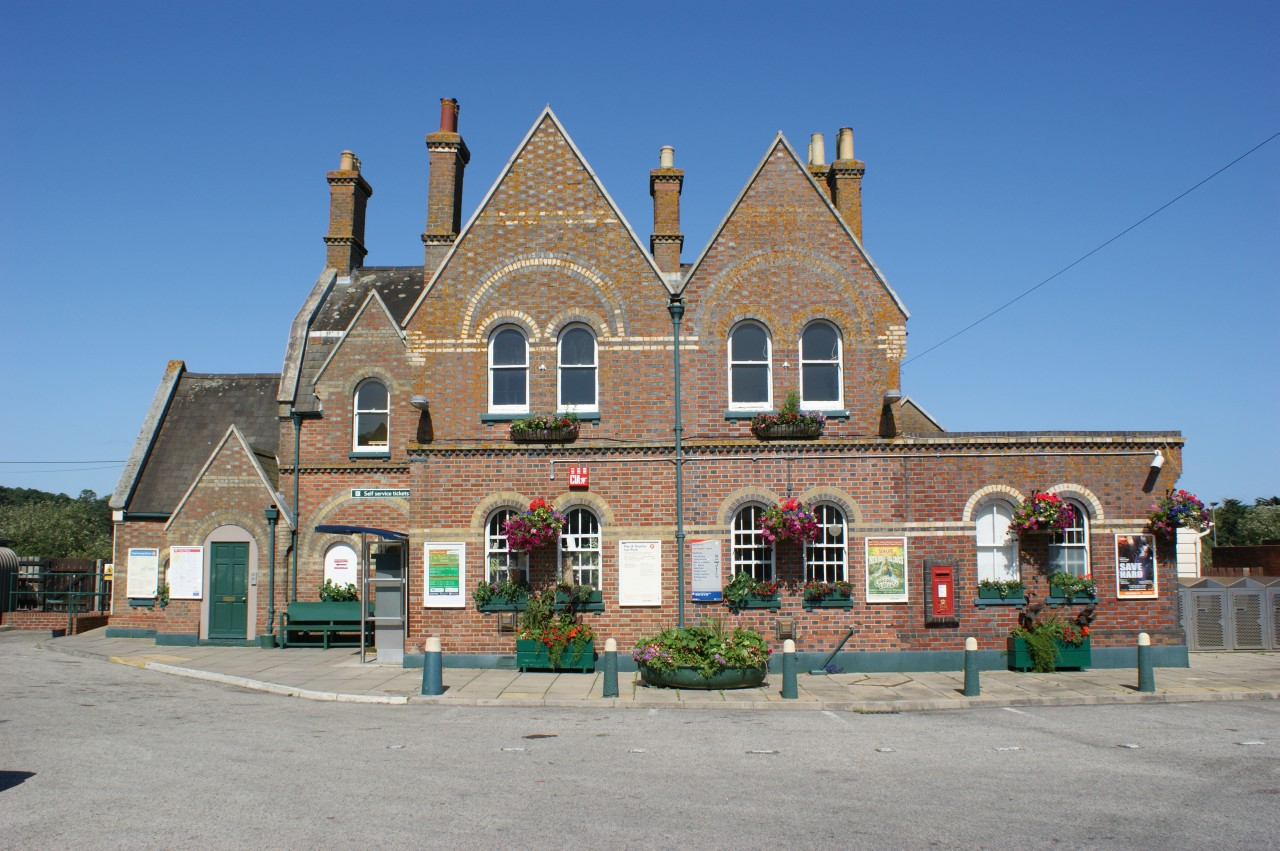

General information
- Location: Lymington, New Forest; England
- Grid reference: SZ327958
- Manager: South Western Railway
- Platforms: 1

Other information
- Station code: LYT
- Classification: DfT category E

History
- Opened: 1858

Passengers
- 2020/21: ▼73,890
- 2021/22: ▲0.200 million
- 2022/23: ▲0.214 million
- 2023/24: ▲0.231 million
- 2024/25: ▲0.242 million
Location
Notes
- Passenger statistics from the Office of Rail and Road

Lymington Town railway station serves the town of Lymington in Hampshire, England. It is 97 miles 57 chains (157.3 km) down the line from London Waterloo and is the only intermediate station on the Lymington Branch Line from Brockenhurst.

Celebrations were held at Lymington Town (as well as at Brockenhurst) in 2008 to mark the 150th anniversary of the line. The station is managed by South Western Railway, which also operates all trains serving it.

== History ==
The Lymington Railway, running between Brockenhurst and Lymington was established in 1856 and opened to a temporary station at Lymington on 12 July 1858. A permanent station was opened at Lymington Town in 1860. Three years later the company acquired a ferry to the Isle of Wight. The company was absorbed by the London and South Western Railway in 1879. Services were extended to Lymington Pier in 1884.

=== Motive Power Depot ===
The Lymington Railway built a small engine shed north of the station in 1858. This was extended in 1874, and remained open until 1966.

== Services ==
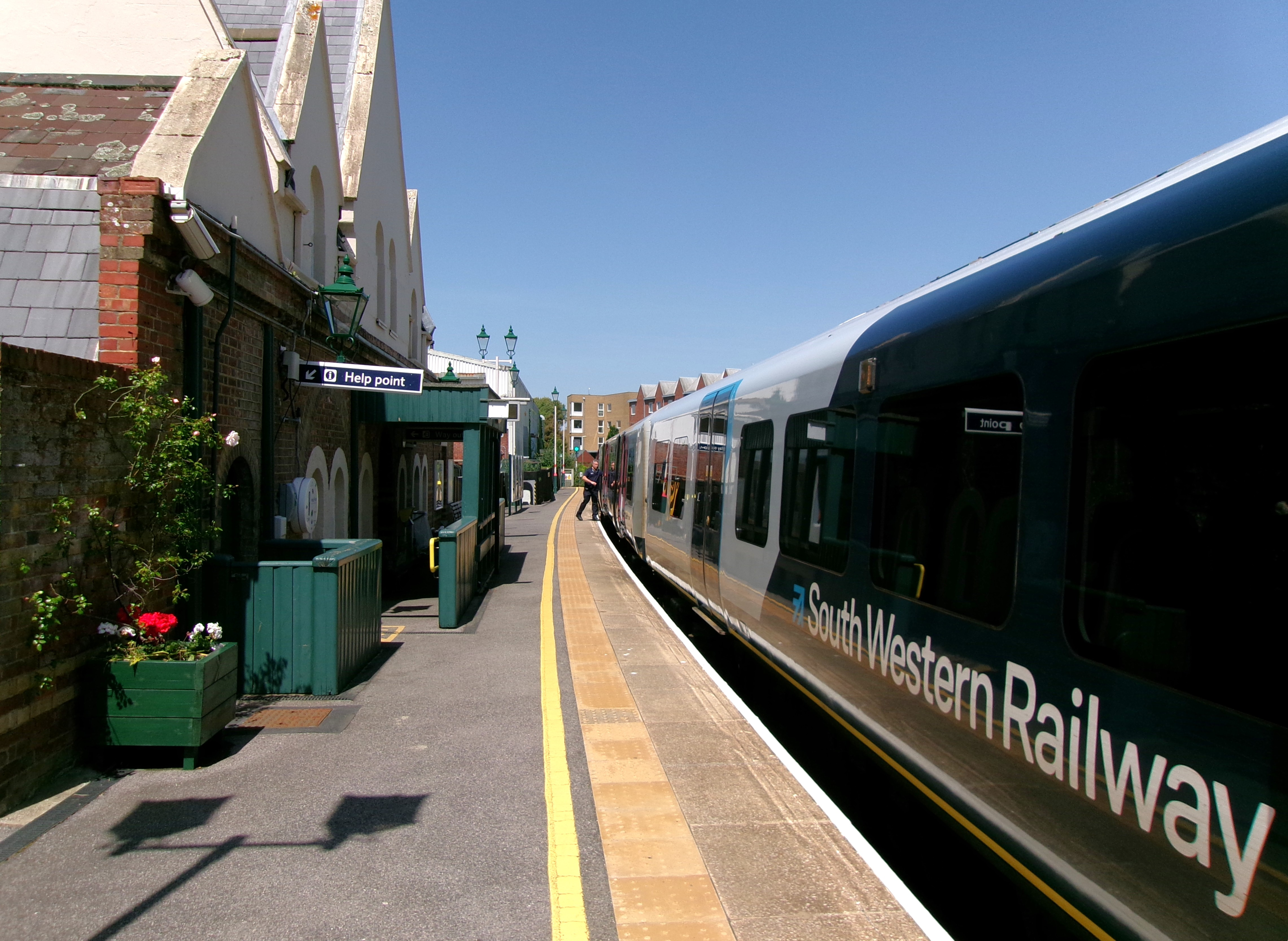
Brokenhurst-bound South Western Railway service at the station in 2026

All services at Lymington Town are operated by South Western Railway using Class 450 EMUs.

The typical off-peak service in trains per hour is:

- 2 tph to Brockenhurst
- 2 tph to Lymington Pier

Until 22 May 2010, the Lymington Branch Line was operated as a "heritage" service using restored Class 421 4Cig trains.

Preceding station	National Rail	Following station
Brockenhurst	South Western Railway; Lymington Branch Line	Lymington Pier
	Historical railways	
Ampress Works Halt	British Rail Southern Region; Lymington Branch Line	Lymington Pier
