= Brockenhurst railway station =

Railway station in Hampshire, England

Brockenhurst
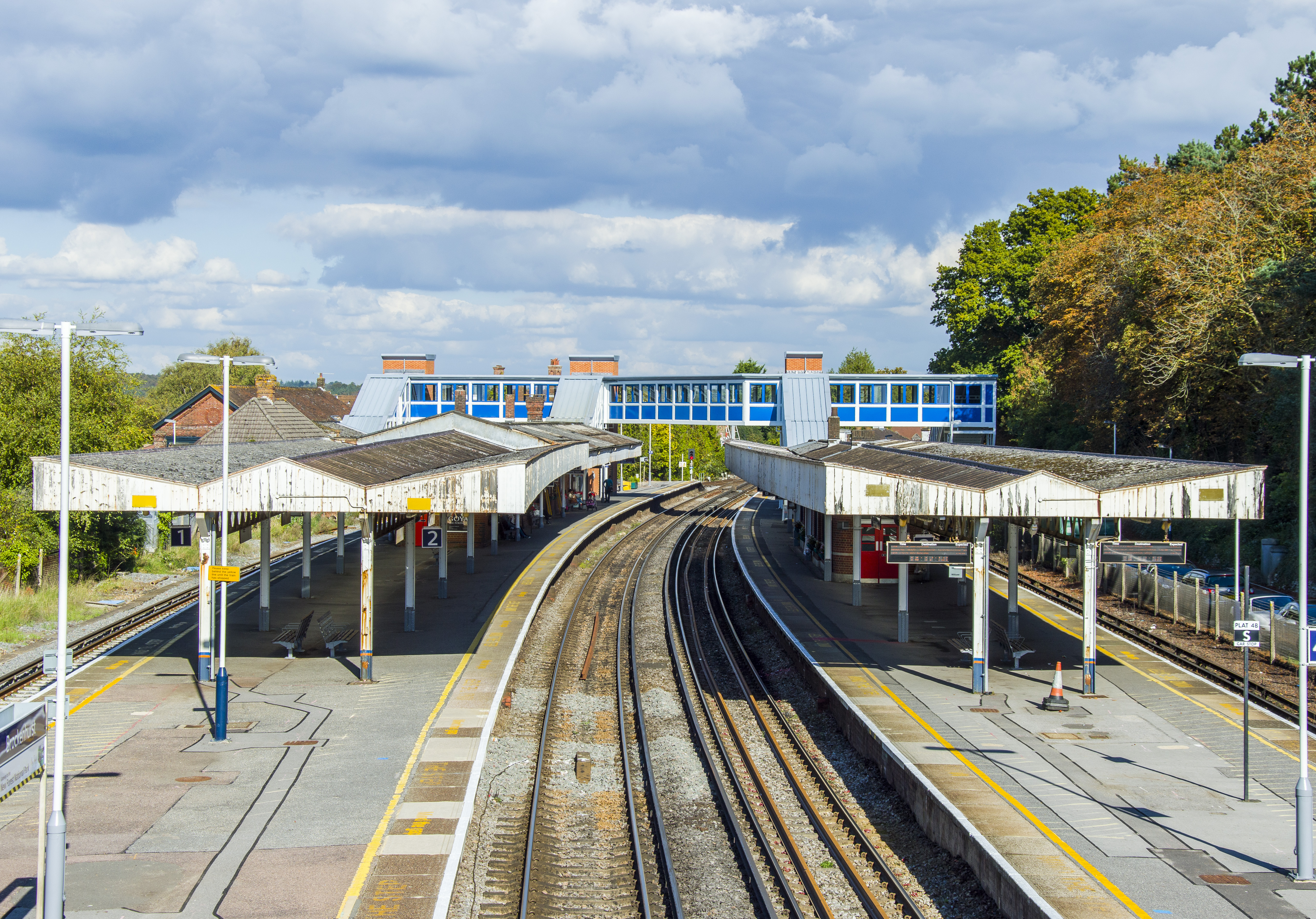
- Brockenhurst station

General information
- Location: Brockenhurst, District of New Forest; England
- Coordinates: 50°48′59″N 1°34′26″W
- Grid reference: SU301019
- Manager: South Western Railway
- Platforms: 4

Other information
- Station code: BCU
- Classification: DfT category C2

History
- Original company: Southampton and Dorchester Railway
- Pre-grouping: London and South Western Railway
- Post-grouping: Southern Railway

Key dates
- 1 June 1847: Opened

Passengers
- 2020/21: ▼0.231 million
- Interchange: ▼69,468
- 2021/22: ▲0.734 million
- Interchange: ▲0.200 million
- 2022/23: ▲0.799 million
- Interchange: ▼0.196 million
- 2023/24: ▲0.838 million
- Interchange: ▲0.217 million
- 2024/25: ▲0.986 million
- Interchange: ▲0.230 million
Location
Notes
- Passenger statistics from the Office of Rail and Road

Brockenhurst railway station serves the village of Brockenhurst, in Hampshire, England. It is located on the South West Main Line between London Waterloo and Weymouth. It is also the junction of the Lymington Branch Line with the main line. It lies 92 miles 66 chains (149.4 km) down the line from Waterloo. It is managed and served by South Western Railway, with some CrossCountry trains also calling here.

== History ==
Brockenhurst station was opened on 1 June 1847 as part of the Southampton and Dorchester Railway (nicknamed the Castleman's Corkscrew) with services running to Southampton in one direction and Dorchester via Ringwood and Wimborne Minster the other. The following year, the railway was amalgamated with the London and South Western Railway. On 12 July 1858 the Lymington Branch Line opened, beginning shuttle services between the station and Lymington, turning the station into a junction station and leading to its name being changed between 1876 and 1888 to Brockenhurst Junction to emphasise this.

On 5 March 1888, the direct line from Brockenhurst via Sway to Bournemouth and Poole and bypassing the longer 'Corkscrew', opened to traffic. This massively increased the number of trains passing through the station for both routes and enhancing its status as an interchange, especially after the downgrading of the 'corkscrew' in 1893 to that of a branch line. Brockenhurst station, along with the L&SWR was taken over by Southern Railway in 1923 and under their ownership, the station was extended in 1936 to include two new platforms. Services over the old Southampton and Dorchester line via Ringwood fell victim to the Beeching Axe, ceasing in May 1964. The track through the station was electrified in 1967 and the station saw minor changes as part of British Rail's Network SouthEast region.

The station was used as a filming location for the 1974 film Brief Encounter, a poorly-received remake of the well-known 1945 film of the same name. The station represented Winchester railway station in the film, and the running in boards were altered to reflect this.

In 2014, the station received £4.6 million of government grants as part of the Access for All initiative to replace the footbridge at Brockenhurst with a new bridge complete with lift shafts. Step-free access to platforms 1 and 2 was previously by a rotating turntable bridge across the tracks while step-free access to platforms 3 and 4 was across the track bed itself.

== Station layout ==
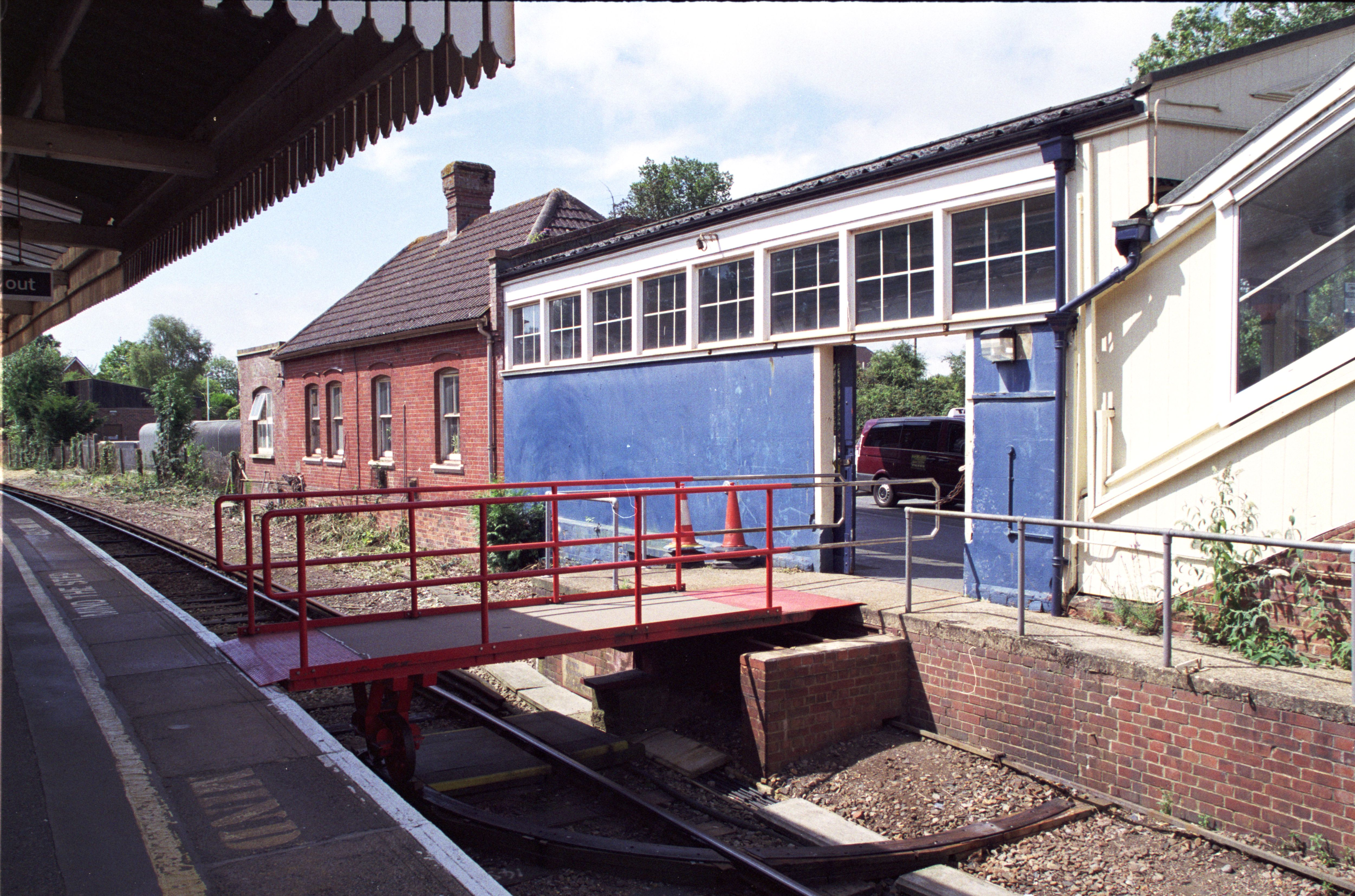
The platform swing bridge

The station consists of four platforms, arranged in two island platforms, with a ticket office housed in the main building nearest platform 1 on the side closest to the village. The platforms, ticket office and car park are all connected by footbridge, with the ticket office at one end and the car park and bicycle hire point at the other end of the walkway.

- Platform 1 – Up loop platform used by stopping services from Poole where it is overtaken by the express services from Weymouth and CrossCountry services from Bournemouth on platform 2.
- Platform 2 – for through services towards Southampton, Winchester and London Waterloo.
- Platform 3 – for through services towards Bournemouth, Poole and Weymouth.
- Platform 4 – Down loop platform for Lymington services

A signal box and level crossing is located at the northern end of the station.

== Service ==
The station is served primarily by South Western Railway services between Weymouth and London Waterloo. In addition, CrossCountry operate one train per hour from Bournemouth to Manchester Piccadilly, via Reading and Birmingham New Street.

The typical off-peak service in trains per hour (tph) is:

- 2 tph to London Waterloo
- 1 tph to Weymouth
- 1 tph to Weymouth and Poole, dividing at Bournemouth
- 1 tph to Bournemouth, calling at all stations, operated by South Western
- 1 tph to Bournemouth, running fast to Bournemouth, operated by CrossCountry
- 1 tph to Winchester
- 2 tph to Lymington Pier.
- 1 tph to Manchester Piccadilly

During peak hours, some services to/from Weymouth do not call here; instead, the station is served by a stopping portion to/from Poole, which divides from or attaches to the Weymouth portion at Southampton Central.

On Sundays, the services between Winchester and Bournemouth do not run; trains to Weymouth and Poole do not divide at Bournemouth and run only to Poole.

Preceding station	National Rail	Following station
Beaulieu Road or Totton or Southampton Central	South Western Railway; South West Main Line	Sway or New Milton or Bournemouth
Terminus	South Western Railway; Lymington branch line	Lymington Town
Southampton Central	CrossCountry; Bournemouth–Manchester	Bournemouth
	Historical railways	
Terminus	British Rail; Southern Region; Southampton and Dorchester Railway	Holmsley

== Connections ==
Local bus routes serve the bus stop located outside the ticket hall. There is a year-round Morebus (New Forest Breezer) 86 service to Lymington in the south and Lyndhurst to the north. In the summer time, this is supplemented by the seasonal New Forest Tour green, red and blue routes to Lymington, Beaulieu, Hythe and Lyndhurst, to Lyndhurst, Ashurst, Fordingbridge, Ringwood and Burley, and to Burley, New Milton, Barton on Sea, Milford on Sea and Lymington.

== Awards ==
The station was the winner of the 2009 National Rail Award for best medium-sized station; the judges stated that they "were impressed by the standard of customer service, station presentation, initiative and innovation they observed, all of which ensure that the station provides a smooth, efficient and pleasant departure and arrival point for the travelling customer."

The station was also winner of a National Cycling Award, for a system which informs passengers where cycle spaces are on approaching trains, allowing them to speed-up boarding and form partnerships with local bike-hire firms.

== Gallery ==
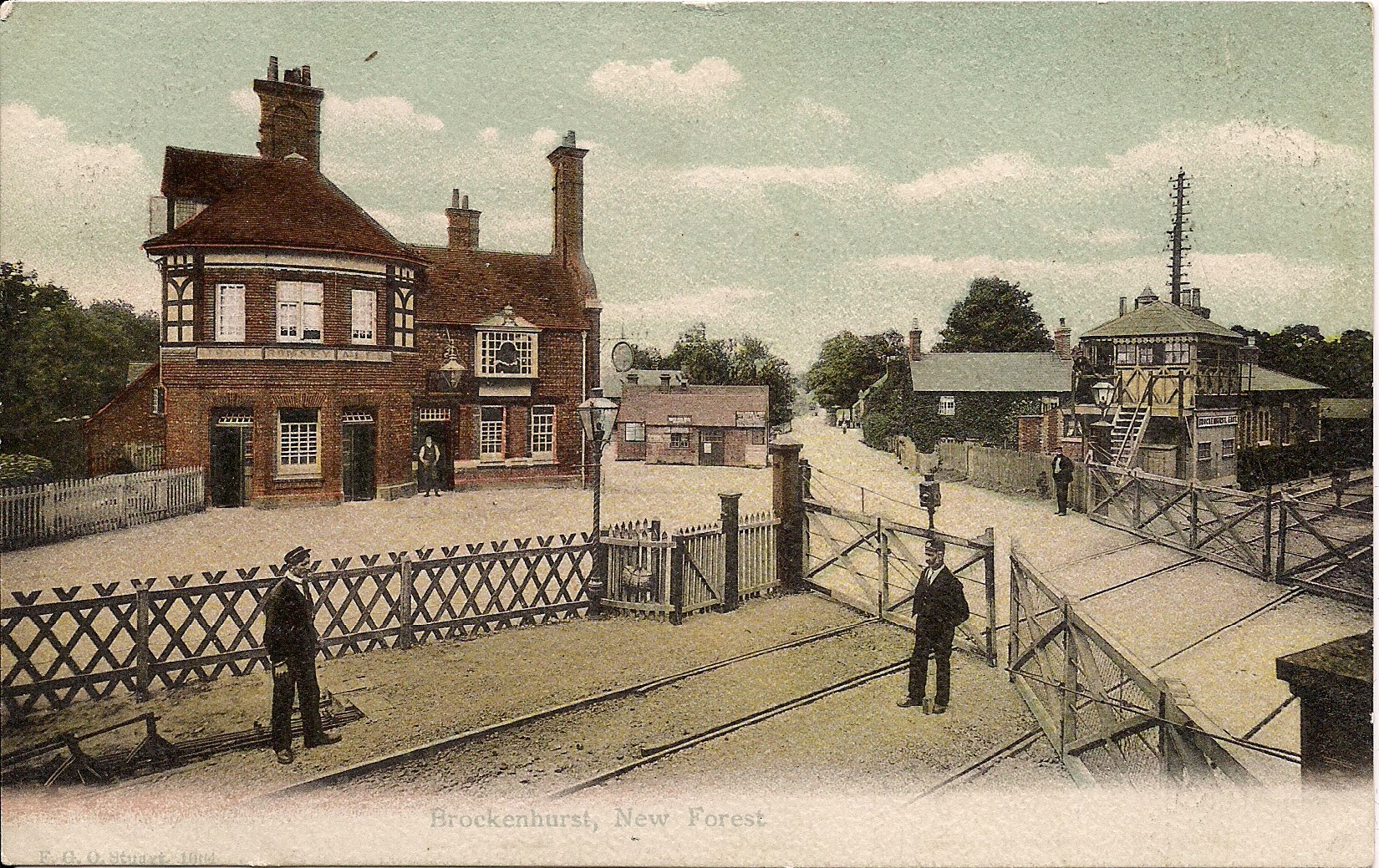
View from station in 1906, showing the level crossing and signal box

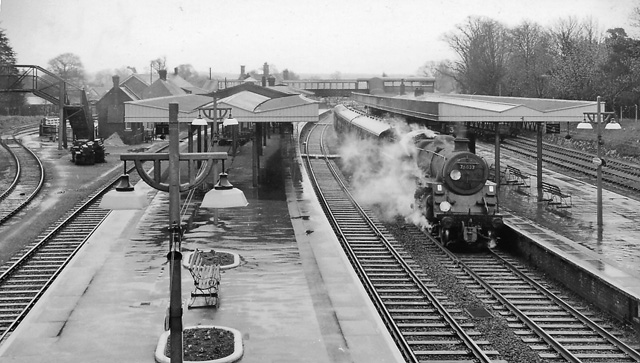
The station as it was in 1963; platforms 1 and 2 are on the left, with platforms 3 and 4 on the right

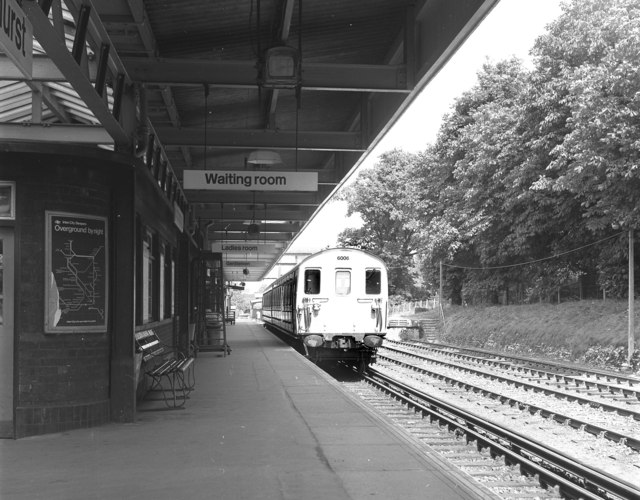
A Class 414 electric multiple unit at platform 4 in 1973

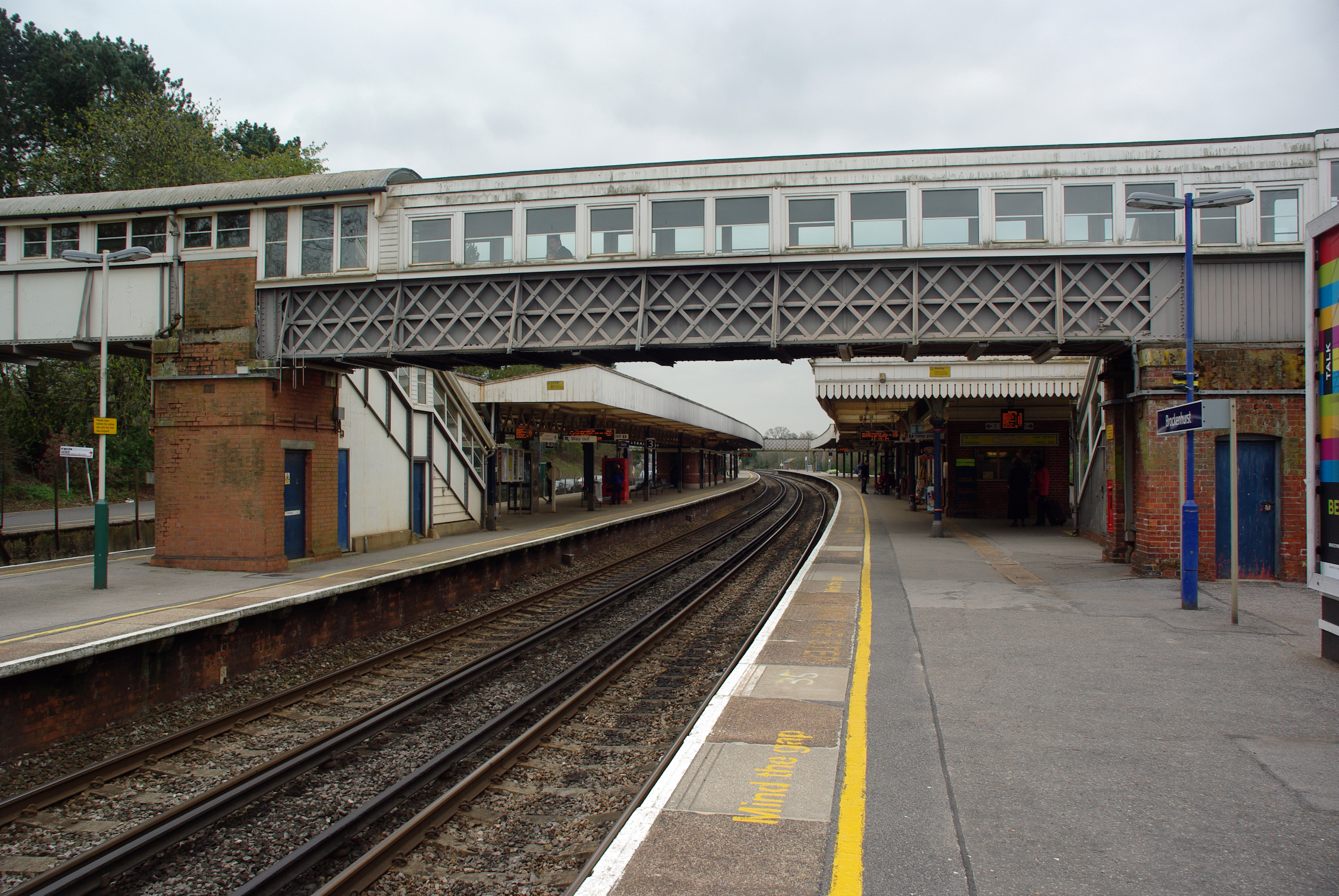
Former footbridge in 2010, now replaced by a modern accessible structure with lifts
