= Horsley railway station =

Railway station in Surrey, England

Horsley
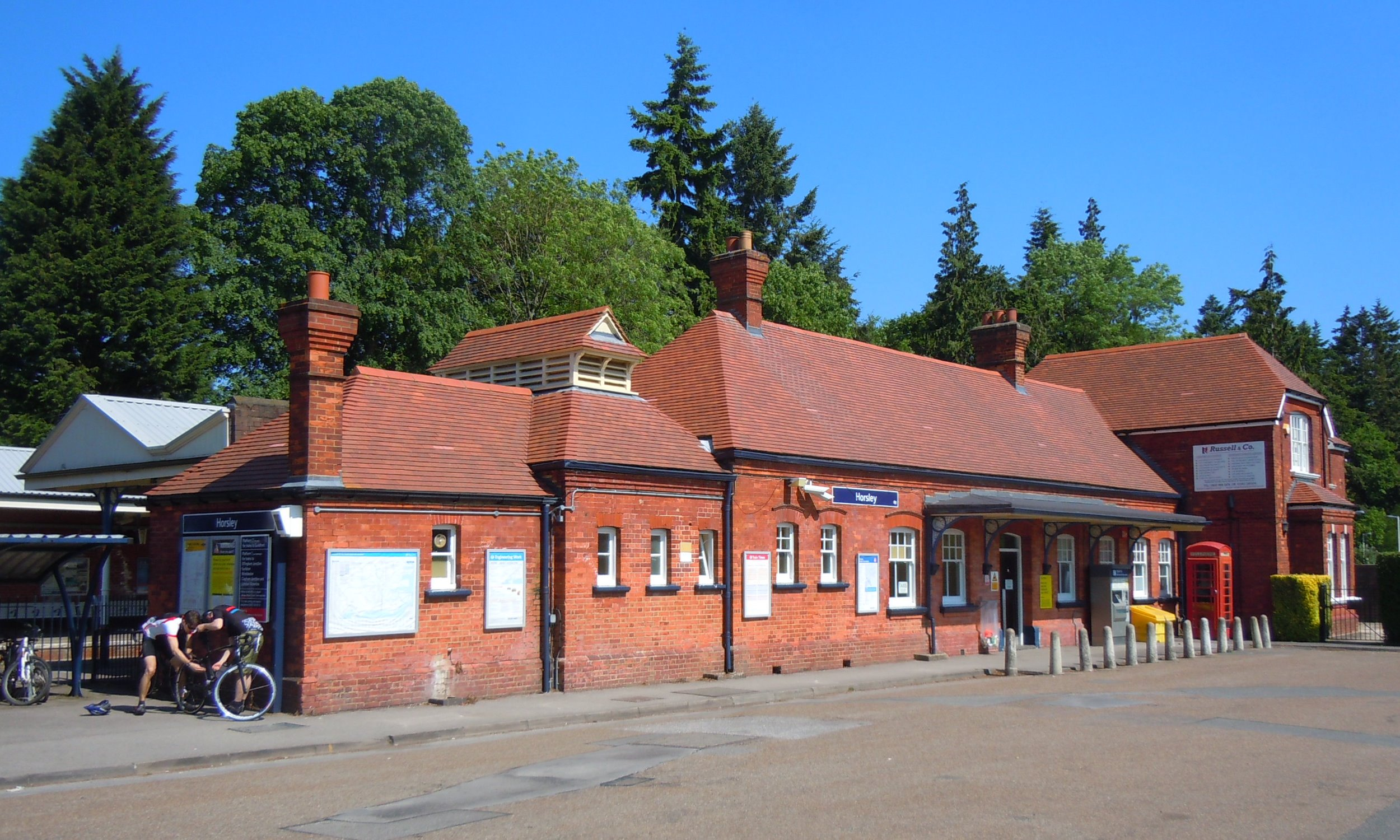

General information
- Location: East Horsley, Guildford; England
- Coordinates: 51°16′44″N 0°26′06″W
- Grid reference: TQ092545
- Managed by: South Western Railway
- Platforms: 2

Other information
- Station code: HSY
- Classification: DfT category D

History
- Original company: London and South Western Railway
- Pre-grouping: London and South Western Railway
- Post-grouping: Southern Railway

Key dates
- 2 February 1885: Opened as Horsley and Ockham and Ripley
- December 1914: Renamed Horsley

Passengers
- 2020/21: ▼54,926
- 2021/22: ▲0.199 million
- 2022/23: ▲0.279 million
- 2023/24: ▲0.321 million
- 2024/25: ▲0.349 million
Location
Notes
- Passenger statistics from the Office of Rail and Road

Horsley railway station is located in the village of East Horsley in Surrey, England. It is 22 miles 16 chains (35.7 km) down the line from London Waterloo, and also serves the village of West Horsley, as well as the nearby villages of Ockham and Ripley.

The station is managed by South Western Railway, who provide the majority of train services; Southern also provide some peak period services. It is situated on the New Guildford Line between London (to the northeast) and Guildford (to the southwest) via Cobham, although some trains operate via Epsom rather than Cobham.

== History ==
The railway lines connecting Hampton Court Junction (near Surbiton) and Leatherhead with Guildford via Effingham Junction were proposed in 1880 and authorised to be constructed by the London and South Western Railway. They opened on 2 February 1885. One of the stations between Effingham Junction and Guildford which opened the same day was Horsley and Ockham and Ripley; the name was simplified to Horsley in December 1914, but some timetables showed it as "Horsley for East Horsley, West Horsley, Ockham and Ripley".

== Services ==
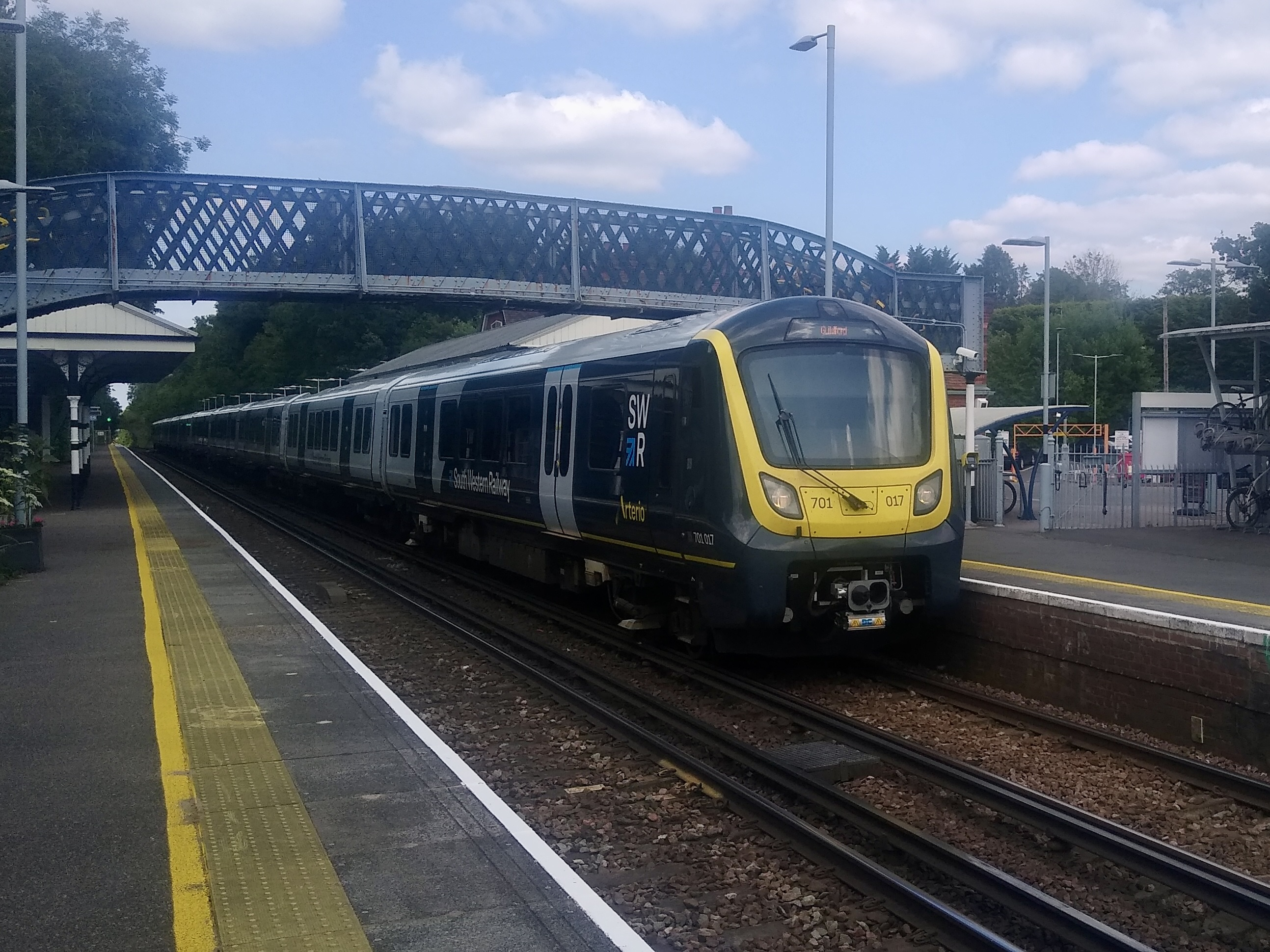
A South Western Railway service to Guildford, formed of a Class 701 EMU

All services at Horsley are operated by South Western Railway using Class 450 and Class 701 EMUs.

The typical off-peak service in trains per hour is:

- 3 tph to London Waterloo (2 of these run via Cobham and 1 runs via Epsom)
- 3 tph to Guildford

Additional services run via Epsom during the peak hours, increasing the service to 4 tph in each direction.

Preceding station	National Rail	Following station
Effingham Junction	South Western Railway New Guildford Line	Clandon

== Accidents and incidents ==
- On 4 January 2019, a 51-year-old male passenger was fatally stabbed on board a South Western Railway service from Guildford to London Waterloo, as it was travelling between London Road and Clandon stations in Surrey. The train was stopped at Horsley to allow emergency services to deal with the incident. The station was closed and cordoned off by the emergency services as a result, to allow a murder inquiry to take place. The suspect in the stabbing, Darren Pencille, left the train at Clandon and was arrested the following day; he was found guilty of murder and sentenced to life imprisonment.
