= Clandon railway station =

Railway station in Surrey, England

Clandon
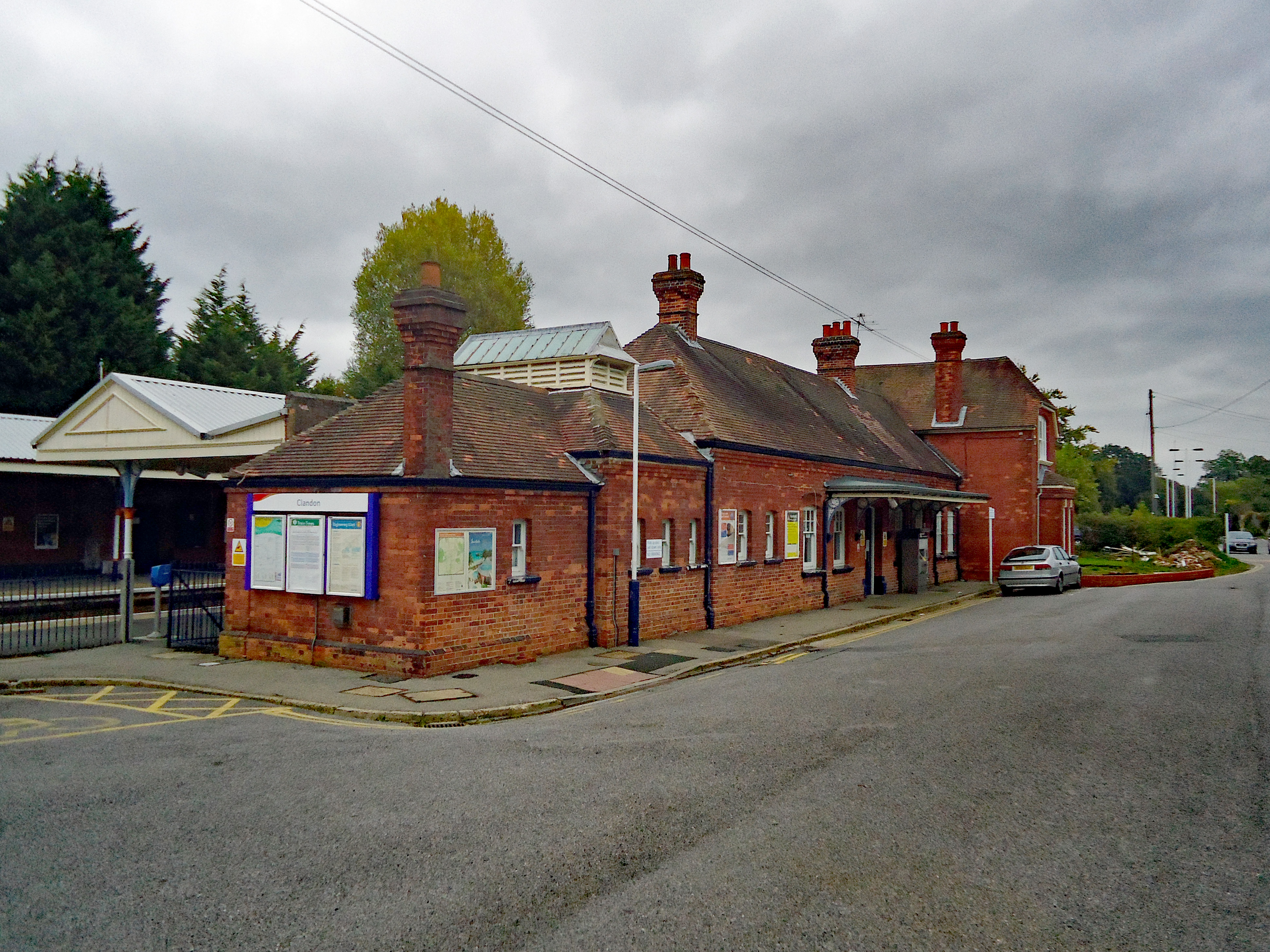
- Clandon railway station

General information
- Location: West Clandon, Guildford; England
- Coordinates: 51°15′50″N 0°30′11″W
- Grid reference: TQ045527
- Managed by: South Western Railway
- Platforms: 2

Other information
- Station code: CLA
- Classification: DfT category E

History
- Opened: 1885

Passengers
- 2020/21: ▼31,444
- 2021/22: ▲93,054
- 2022/23: ▲0.119 million
- 2023/24: ▲0.150 million
- 2024/25: ▲0.166 million
Location
Notes
- Passenger statistics from the Office of Rail and Road

Clandon railway station is located in the village of West Clandon in Surrey, England. It is 25 miles 26 chains (40.8 km) down the line from London Waterloo.

The station is managed by South Western Railway, who provide the majority of train services; Southern also provide some peak period services.

It is situated on the New Guildford Line between Waterloo and Guildford via Cobham or Epsom.

== Services ==
All services at Clandon are operated by South Western Railway using Class 450 and Class 701 EMUs.

The typical off-peak service in trains per hour is:

- 3 tph to London Waterloo (2 of these run via Cobham and 1 runs via Epsom)
- 3 tph to Guildford

Additional services run via Epsom during the peak hours, increasing the service to 4 tph in each direction.

Preceding station	National Rail	Following station
Horsley	South Western Railway New Guildford Line	London Road (Guildford)

== Accidents and incidents ==
- On 4 January 2019, a 51-year-old male passenger was fatally stabbed on board a South Western Railway service from Guildford to London Waterloo, as it was travelling between London Road and Clandon stations. The train was stopped at the next station along the line, Horsley, to allow emergency services to deal with the incident. The suspect in the stabbing exited the train at Clandon and was arrested the following day. The suspect, Darren Pencille, was subsequently found guilty of murder and sentenced to life imprisonment.
