= London Road (Guildford) railway station =

Railway station in Surrey, England

London Road (Guildford)
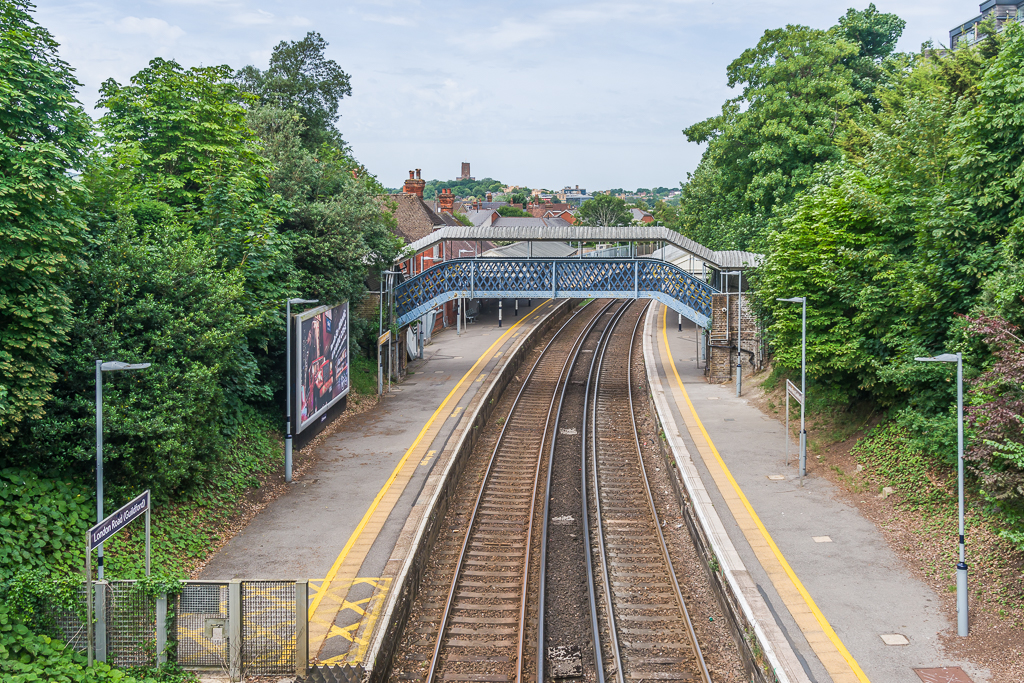
- The station from the east in 2026

General information
- Location: Guildford, Guildford; England
- Coordinates: 51°14′27″N 0°33′55″W
- Grid reference: TQ002500
- Manager: South Western Railway
- Platforms: 2

Other information
- Station code: LRD
- Classification: DfT category D

History
- Opened: 1885

Passengers
- 2020/21: ▼0.203 million
- 2021/22: ▲0.584 million
- 2022/23: ▲0.721 million
- 2023/24: ▲0.802 million
- 2024/25: ▲0.869 million
Location
Notes
- Passenger statistics from the Office of Rail and Road

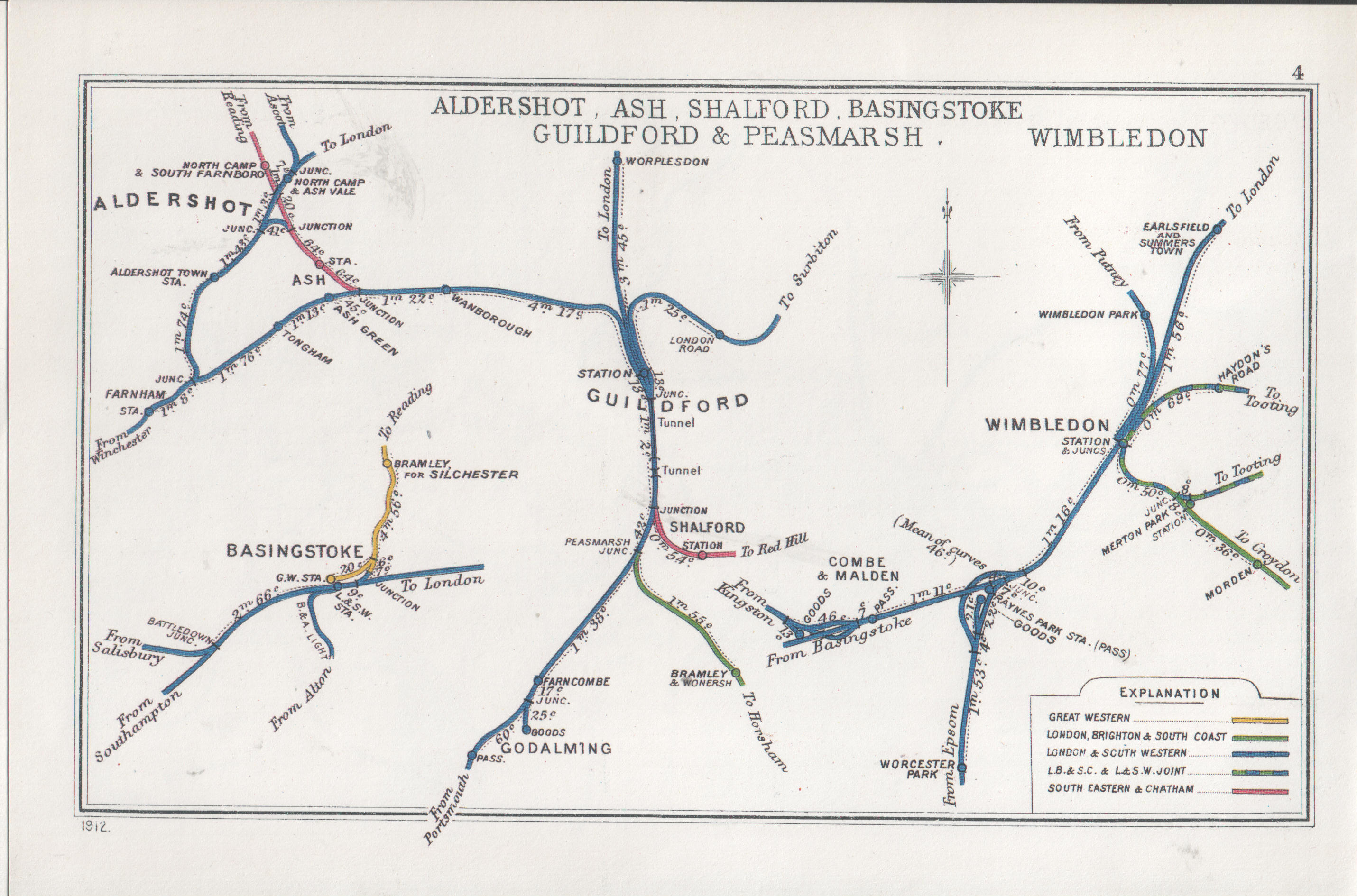
A 1912 Railway Clearing House map of lines around London Road (Guildford) railway station

London Road (Guildford) railway station is in the east of the town centre of Guildford in Surrey, England, close to the suburbs of Merrow and Burpham. It is 28 miles 47 chains (46.0 km) down the line from London Waterloo.

It is on the New Guildford Line between Waterloo and Guildford via Cobham or Epsom. The station is managed by South Western Railway, which also provides all train services.

The parenthesised Guildford is to avoid confusing the station with the similarly named London Road (Brighton). The name was previously changed to "London Road, Guildford" from "London Road" in 1923 when operation of the line was taken over from the London and South Western Railway by the Southern Railway, which then ran all the railways in South East England.

== Platform layout ==
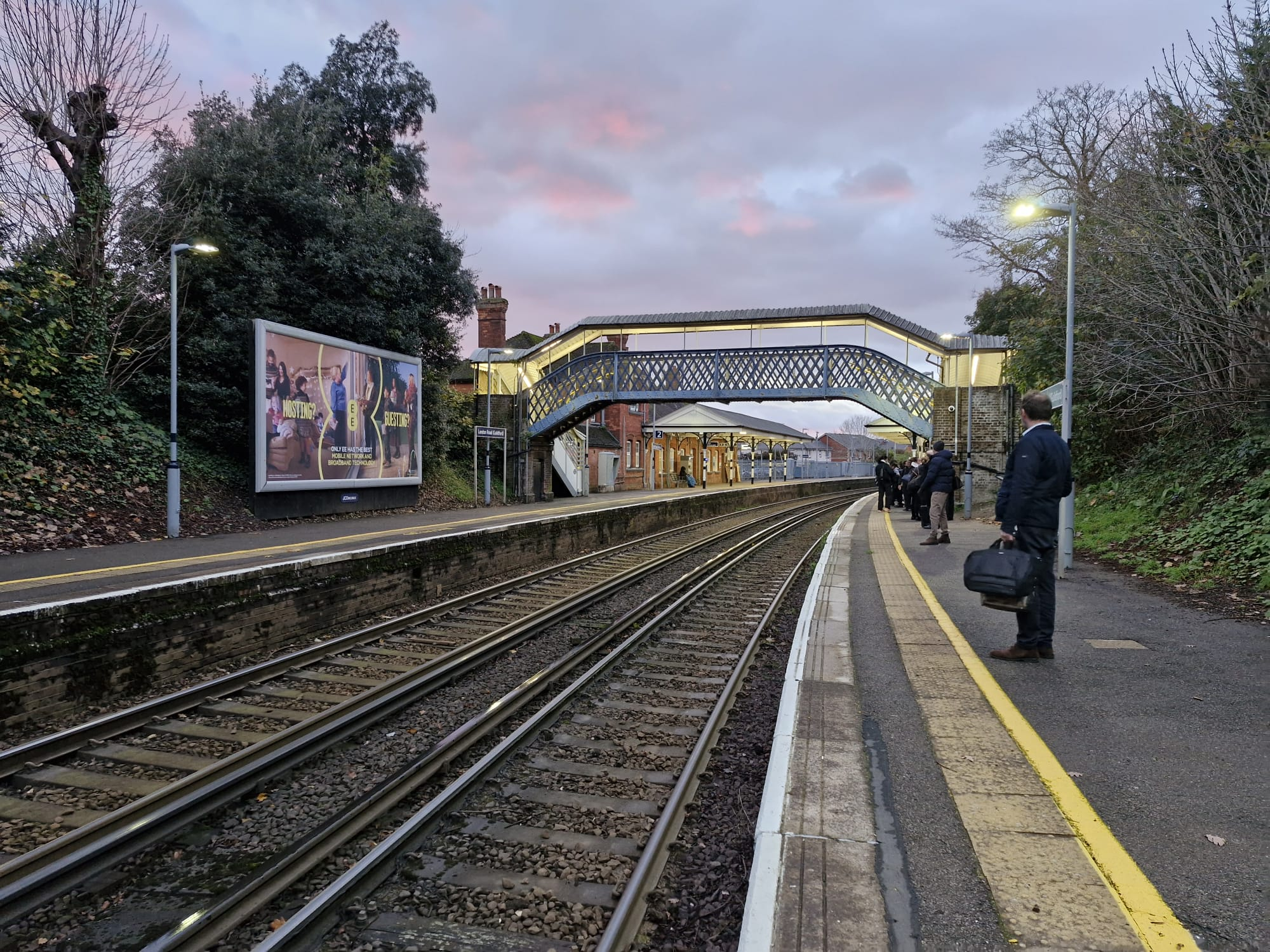
London Road (Guildford), November 2025

Platform 1 - Up trains to London Waterloo via Cobham and Epsom.
Platform 2 - Down trains to Guildford

(There is a footbridge, without a lift, connecting the two platforms together. There are two entrances, one off London Road and one off York Road which is step-free)

== Facilities ==
London Road has two waiting rooms (one on each platform), a ticket office on the down side, open Monday to Saturday mornings. Other facilities include a toilet, a few smart card readers, and two ticket machines. There is also a car park with bicycle storage.

== Services ==
All services at London Road are operated by South Western Railway using a mix of Class 450, and Class 701 EMUs. The typical off-peak service in trains per hour is:

- 3 tph to London Waterloo (2 of these run via Cobham and 1 runs via Epsom)
- 3 tph to Guildford

Additional services run via Cobham in the morning peak hours increasing the number of services to 3 tph via Cobham.

Additional services run via Epsom in peak hours increasing the number of services to 2 tph via Epsom.

On Sundays and bank-holidays, there is a reduced service from the station.

Preceding station	National Rail	Following station
Clandon	South Western Railway New Guildford Line, Mole Valley Line	Guildford

== Accidents and incidents ==
On 4 January 2019, Lee Pomeroy, a 51-year-old male passenger, was fatally stabbed on board a South Western Railway service from Guildford to London Waterloo, as it was travelling between London Road and Clandon stations. The train, formed of a pair of Class 455 electric multiple units, was stopped at the next station along the line, Horsley, to allow emergency services to deal with the incident. Both Pomeroy and the suspect, Darren Pencille, had boarded the train at London Road. Pencille, who had exited the train at Clandon, was arrested the following day. He was subsequently found guilty of murder and sentenced to life imprisonment.
