= Clandon =

Places called Clandon in Surrey, England:

- East Clandon
- West Clandon
- Clandon Park, 18th century Palladian mansion in West Clandon
- Clandon railway station
