= Oxshott railway station =

Railway station in Surrey, England

Oxshott
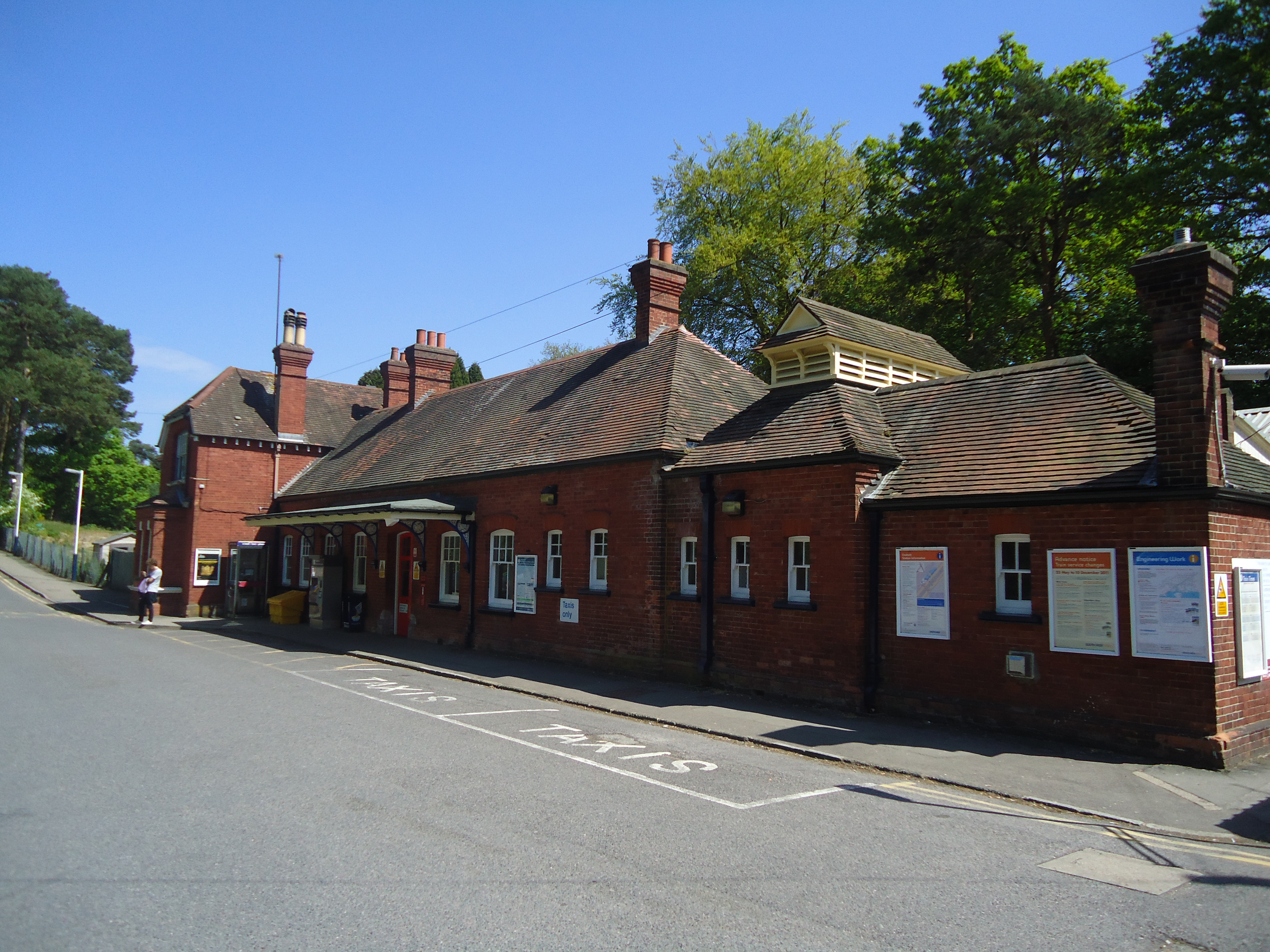

General information
- Location: Oxshott, Elmbridge; England
- Coordinates: 51°20′10″N 0°21′43″W
- Grid reference: TQ141609
- Managed by: South Western Railway
- Platforms: 2

Other information
- Station code: OXS
- Classification: DfT category D

History
- Opened: 1885

Passengers
- 2020/21: ▼88,364
- 2021/22: ▲0.274 million
- 2022/23: ▲0.345 million
- 2023/24: ▲0.407 million
- 2024/25: ▲0.449 million
Location
Notes
- Passenger statistics from the Office of Rail and Road

Oxshott railway station serves the village of Oxshott, in Surrey, England. It is 16 miles 79 chains (27.3 km) down the line from London Waterloo. The station, and all trains serving it, are operated by South Western Railway.

The station is on the New Guildford Line, and is served by trains from Waterloo to Guildford via Cobham.

== History ==
The station opened on 2 February 1885 as Oxshott and Fairmile. At that time the village was, as Fairmile remains, just a hamlet without place of worship. The brickfields here were served by a short siding from the station. These supplied bricks for many London buildings in the late 19th and early 20th centuries.

== Incidents ==
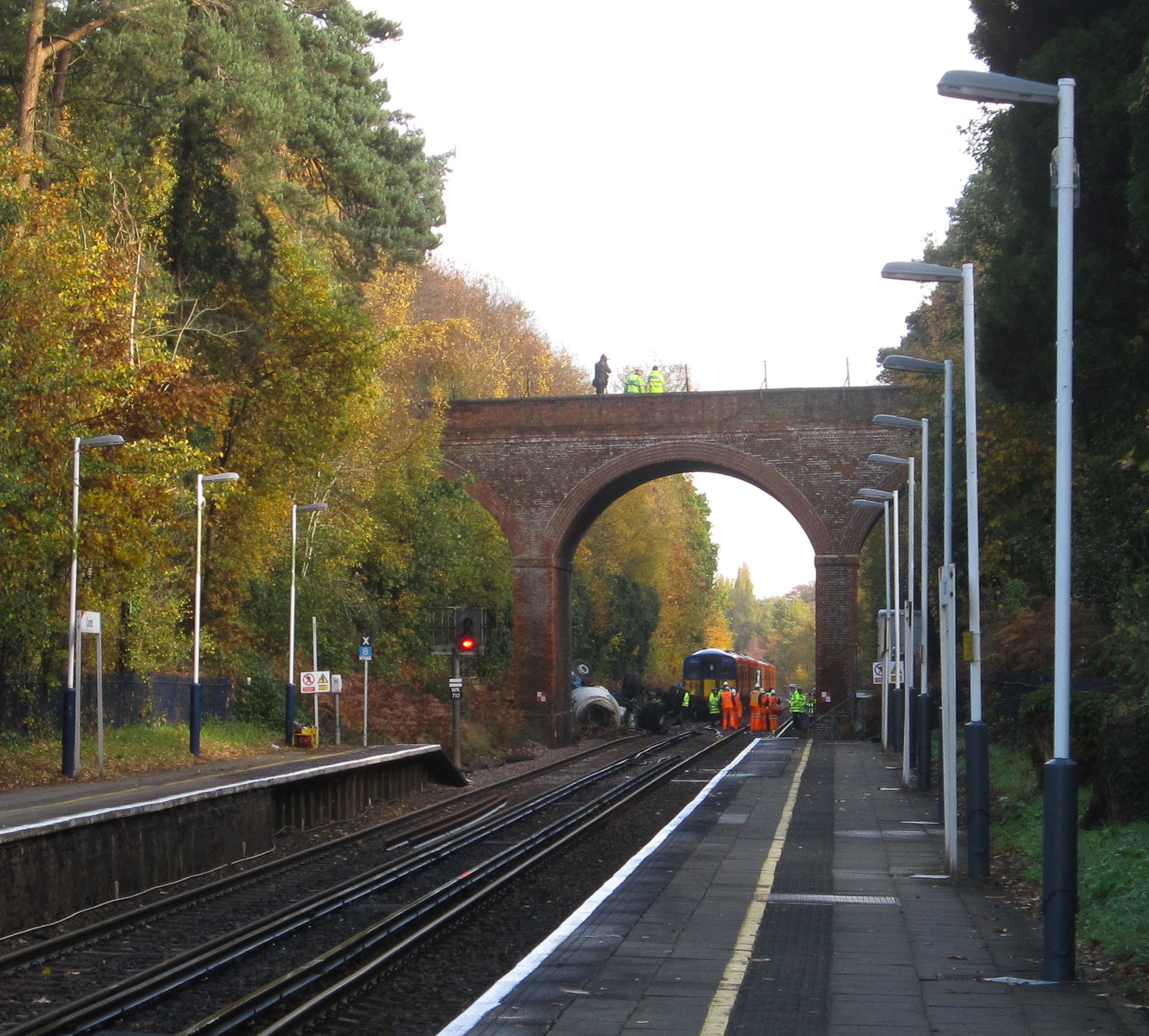
The aftermath of the accident, showing the A244 road bridge, from which the lorry fell, viewed from the station platform, looking towards Claygate.

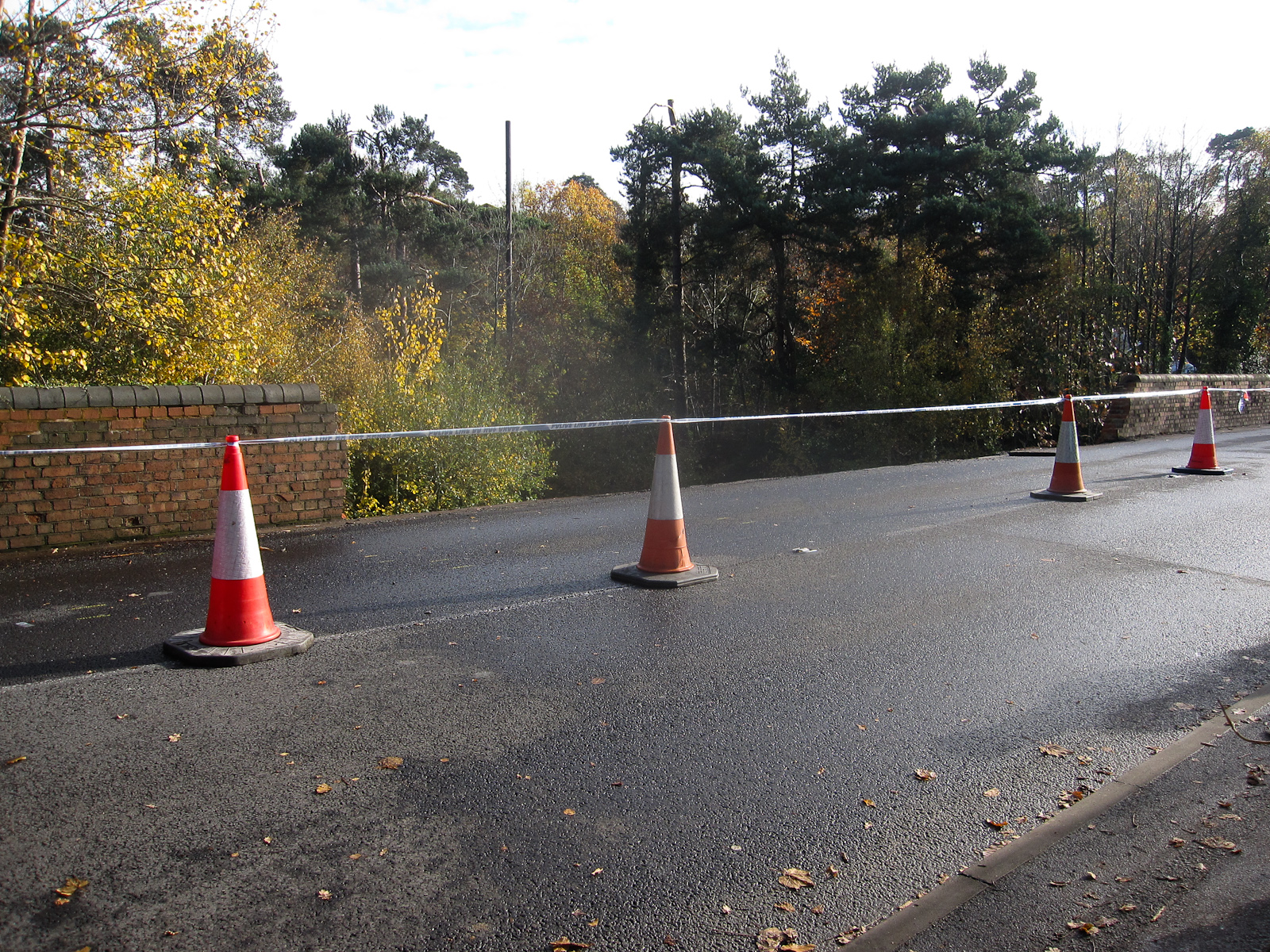
The damage done to the bridge in the incident.

On 5 November 2010, at about 3:30 pm, a concrete mixer lorry fell off the bridge over the railway 50 metres north-east of the station, and landed on carriages of a train accelerating away from the station. No one was killed. Witnesses stated that the rear of the lorry crashed through the parapet of the bridge and dragged the whole vehicle over the side of the bridge. The eight-carriage train, operated by South West Trains, was working the 15:05 Guildford to London Waterloo. The train was formed of two Class 455 electric multiple units. The lorry, loaded with concrete and weighing 24 tonnes, landed on the sixth carriage, severely crushing the end of the roof. Further damage was sustained by the fifth, seventh and eighth carriages, with the last of these being derailed at its trailing bogie, although the train remained upright. British Transport Police reported that six people on board the train sustained minor injuries, whilst the driver of the lorry had sustained more serious injuries. This was later revised to two serious and five minor injuries. The Class 455 electric multiple unit involved has since been fully repaired using a rebuilt carriage from a Class 210 diesel multiple unit and returned to service in July 2013.

== Services ==
All services at Oxshott are operated by South Western Railway using Class 450 and Class 701 EMUs.

The typical off-peak service in trains per hour is:

- 2 tph to London Waterloo via Wimbledon
- 2 tph to Guildford

On Sundays, the service is reduced to hourly in each direction.

Preceding station	National Rail	Following station
Claygate	South Western Railway New Guildford Line	Cobham & Stoke d'Abernon
