= West Clandon =

Village and parish in Surrey, England

Coordinates: 51°15′41″N 0°30′29″W

- Village
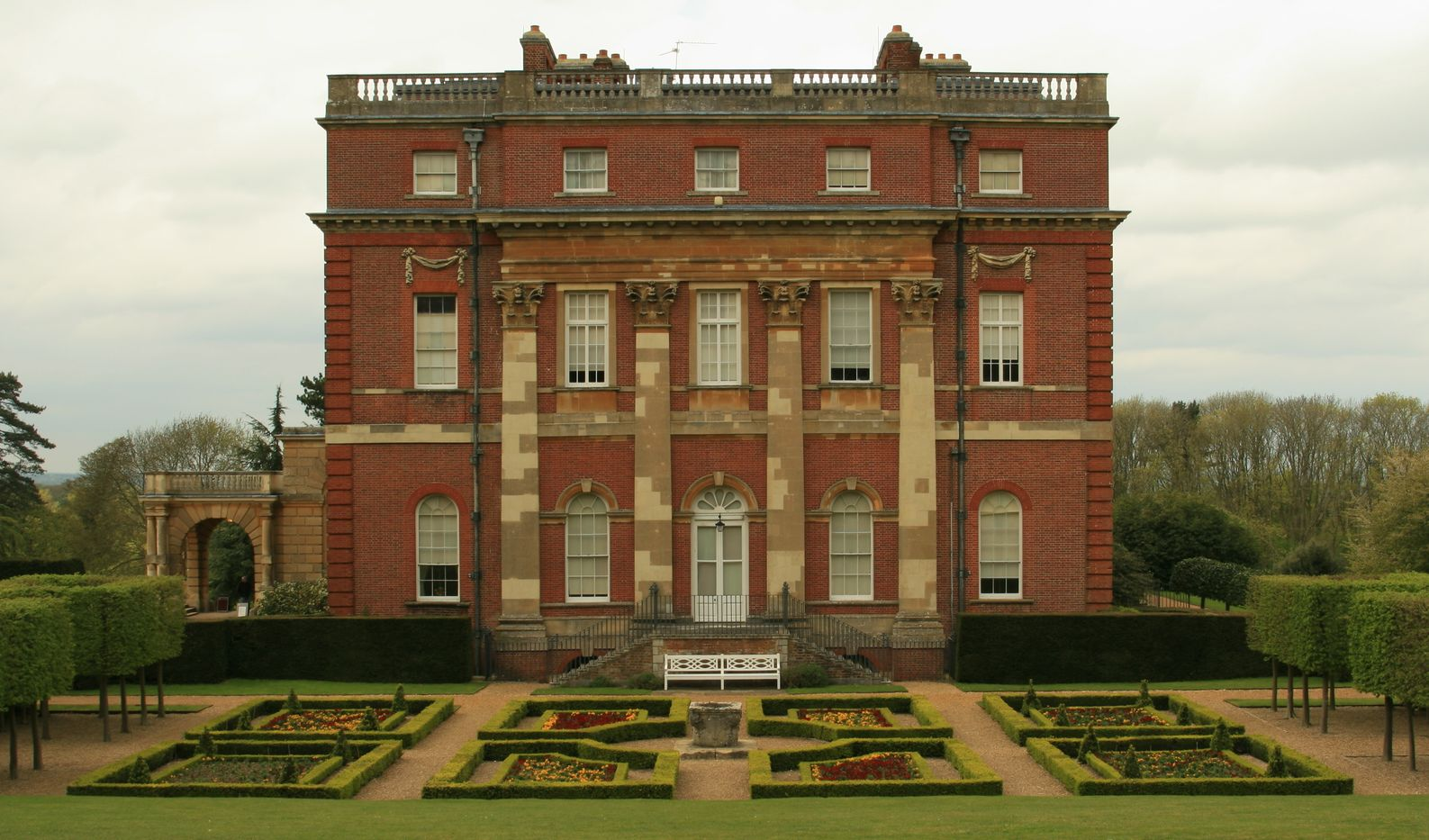
- Clandon Park House pictured before the 2015 fire.

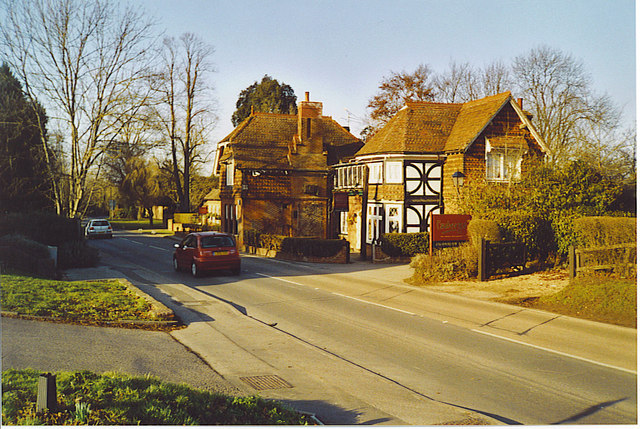
- The Onslow Arms

- Location within Surrey
- Area: 9.57 km^{2} (3.69 sq mi)
- Population: 1,363 (Civil Parish 2011)
  - Density: 142/km^{2} (370/sq mi)
- OS grid reference: TQ041524
- District: Guildford
- Shire county: Surrey
- Region: South East
- Country: England
- Sovereign state: United Kingdom
- Post town: Guildford
- Postcode district: GU4
- Dialling code: 01483
- Police: Surrey
- Fire: Surrey
- Ambulance: South East Coast
- UK Parliament: Guildford

West Clandon is a village in Surrey, England, within 1 mile (1.6 km) of the A3. It is situated 1 mile (1.6 km) north west of the much smaller separate village of East Clandon.

West Clandon is served by Clandon railway station which runs stopping services via Cobham and Stoke d'Abernon as well as via Epsom to London Waterloo in one direction, and to Guildford in the other. Woking railway station is about 5 miles (8.0 km) away (although there is no direct rail link) and offers more destinations and a fast service to London.

== History and landmarks ==
West Clandon appears in Domesday Book undivided as Clanedun held by Hugo (Hugh) from Edward de Salisbury. Its domesday assets were: 2½ hides; 1 church (replaced approximately one century later), 1 mill worth 3s, 2½ ploughs, woodland worth 5 hogs. It rendered £3 per year to its overlords.

Clandon House, a Palladian architecture mansion, is in the village. Owned by The National Trust, it was largely destroyed by a fire in April 2015.

Clandon Park is not part of the National Trust. The park is a 1,000 acres (400 ha) agricultural estate that is the seat of the earls of Onslow and is currently owned and managed by Rupert Onslow, 8th Earl. George Duncumbe owned it from 1615 until 1642 on its gradual sale to Sir Richard Onslow, a mild Roundhead (Parliamentarian), starting with the large lodge in the park in 1642, and a series of transactions with the Onslow family, begun in 1650, was finally concluded in 1711 by the transference of the manor to Sir Richard. Until the late 20th century the Earl was the largest private landowner in the county.

=== Church ===
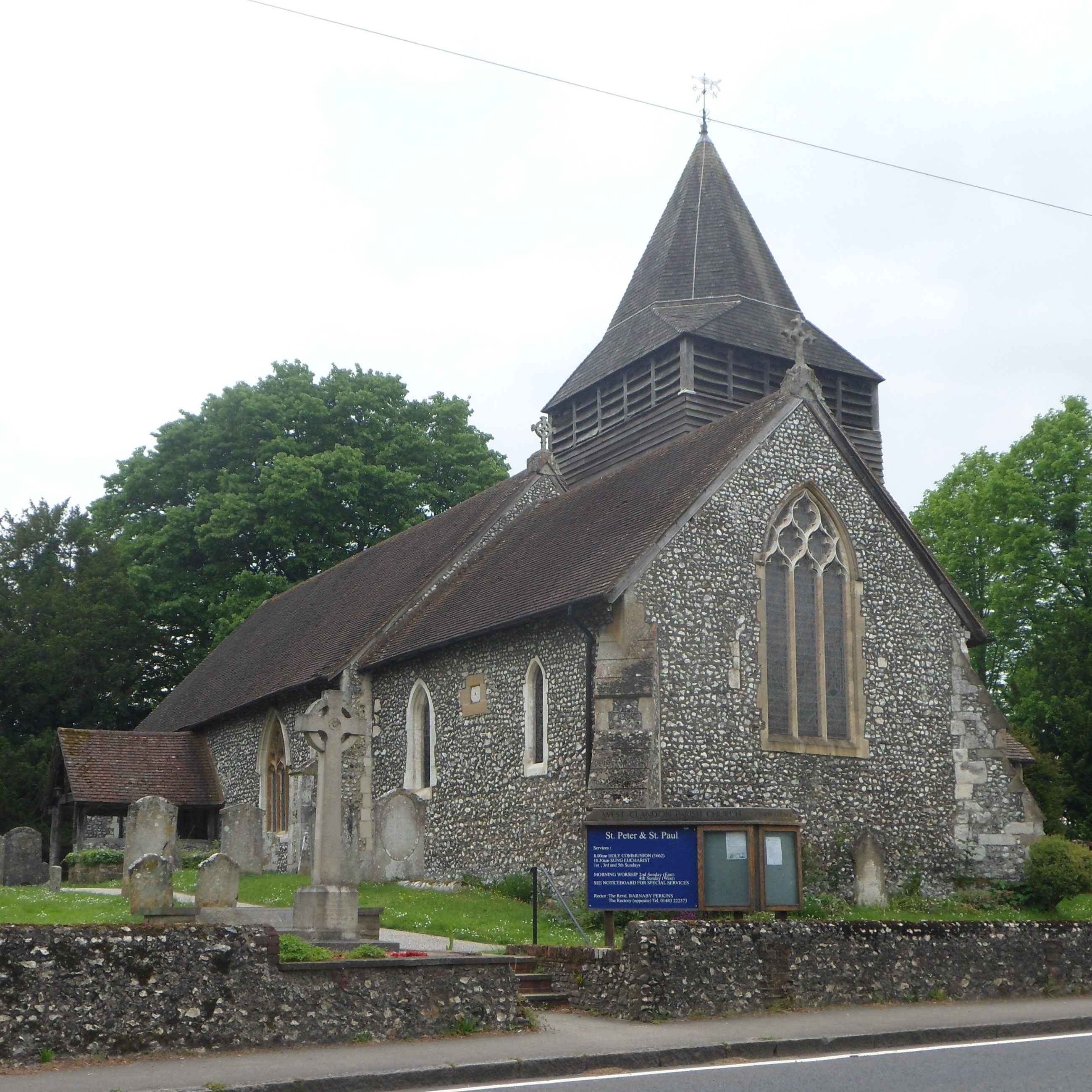
St Peter and St Paul's Church

The largely late 12th century church, dedicated to St Peter and St Paul, has later medieval roofs. There is a canonical sundial on the south wall. In the chancel are preserved, in a glass case, some medieval panels of oak; probably late 13th or early 14th-century date; the figures upon them are St. Peter and St. Paul on either side of Saint Thomas of Canterbury; the two apostles bear their respective emblems, the keys and the sword; the martyred archbishop between them has his right hand raised in benediction, while the left holds the cross staff; there are traces of gold on the nimbus of each saint, and the figures are coarsely outlined in black. Much of the pewing in the western part of the nave is nicely carved in dark wood imported from abroad by a former Earl of Onslow.

The tower had six bells all by Thomas Lester, 1741, but the third, fourth, and fifth were re-cast by Mears and Stainbank in 1875. One was inscribed in capitals 'At proper times my voice II raies, unto my bennifactor praise.' In 1913, these bells were destroyed by fire and six new bells by Mears and Stainbank were installed in 1914. In 1932, Mears and Stainbank added two new trebles and replaced the 1914 treble with a new bell, to give the present ring of eight.

The communion plate includes an Elizabethan cup and cover paten of the date 1569; also another paten of 1712 given by Sir Richard Onslow.

The registers begin in the unusually early year of 1536.

The church is a Grade II* listed building.

== Amenities ==
The only shops within the parish bounds are the Clandon Park gift shop and the Garden Centre. The village has two pubs: The Onslow Arms and The Bull's Head, as well as a British Legion.

== Folklore ==
Legend has it that a dragon once blocked the route to West Clandon. In commemoration there is a dragon cut into the chalk face of an old quarry. The legend was recorded in the Gentleman's Magazine in 1796, where it was recounted that the dragon infested one of the back lanes of the village. A soldier killed the dragon with the help of his dog, in return for being pardoned for desertion. The modern village sign depicts the battle between the dog and the dragon.

Nearby villages include Ockham as well as East and West Horsley. Local towns are Woking and Guildford.

== Demography and housing ==
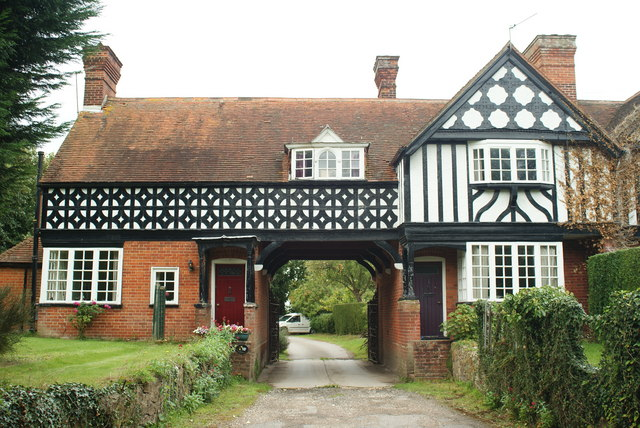
Mock tudor homes in the village

2011 census homes
Output area	Detached	Semi- detached	Terraced	Flats and apartments	Caravans/temporary/ mobile homes	Shared between households
(civil parish)	326	122	17	42	1	0

The average level of accommodation in the region composed of detached houses was 28%, the average that was apartments was 22.6%.

2011 census key statistics
Output area	Population	Households	% owned outright	% owned with a loan	Hectares
(civil parish)	1,363	508	44.1%	28.3%	957

The proportion of households in the civil parish who owned their home outright compares to the regional average of 35.1%. The proportion who owned their home with a loan compares to the regional average of 32.5%. The remaining % is made up of rented dwellings (plus a negligible % of households living rent-free).
