= New Guildford line =

Railway line in South East England

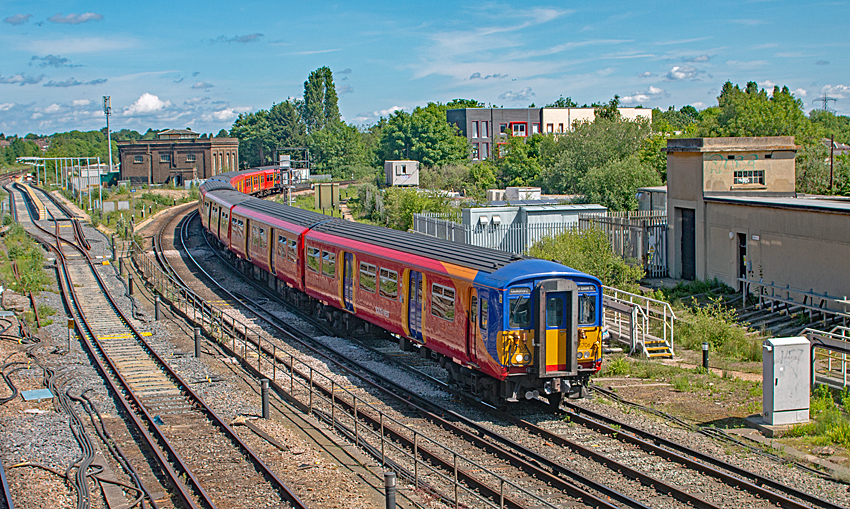
- South West Trains Class 455 arriving at Guildford from the New Line in 2017

Overview
- Status: Operational
- Owner: Network Rail
- Locale: Surrey, South East England
- Termini: Hampton Court Junction; Guildford

Service
- Type: Suburban rail, Heavy rail
- System: National Rail
- Operator(s): South Western Railway
- Rolling stock: Class 450; Class 701

History
- Opened: 1885

Technical
- Track gauge: 1,435 mm (4 ft 8 1/2 in) standard gauge
- Electrification: Third rail, 750 V DC

The New Guildford line, presently operated by South Western Railway, is a commuter line between London Waterloo and Guildford. It branches off the South West Main Line at Hampton Court Junction, just south-west of Surbiton. On timetables, trains on this route are advertised as going to Guildford via Cobham.

Rush hour services provide two (inbound) morning services and one (outbound) evening service non-stop between Surbiton and Waterloo. Off-peak services run twice per hour (once on Sundays) and are slower, stopping at all intermediate stations except between Surbiton and Wimbledon.

A nominally independent company, the Guildford, Kingston and London Railway, proposed a line broadly similar to the present-day route, but joining to the District Railway at Putney Bridge. That scheme failed when the London and South Western Railway (LSWR) agreed to build the present route, including a branch from Effingham Junction to Leatherhead. It opened in 1885. The short section from Hampton Court Junction to Claygate was electrified in 1916, and from Claygate to Guildford in 1925.

== History ==
=== Predecessor schemes ===
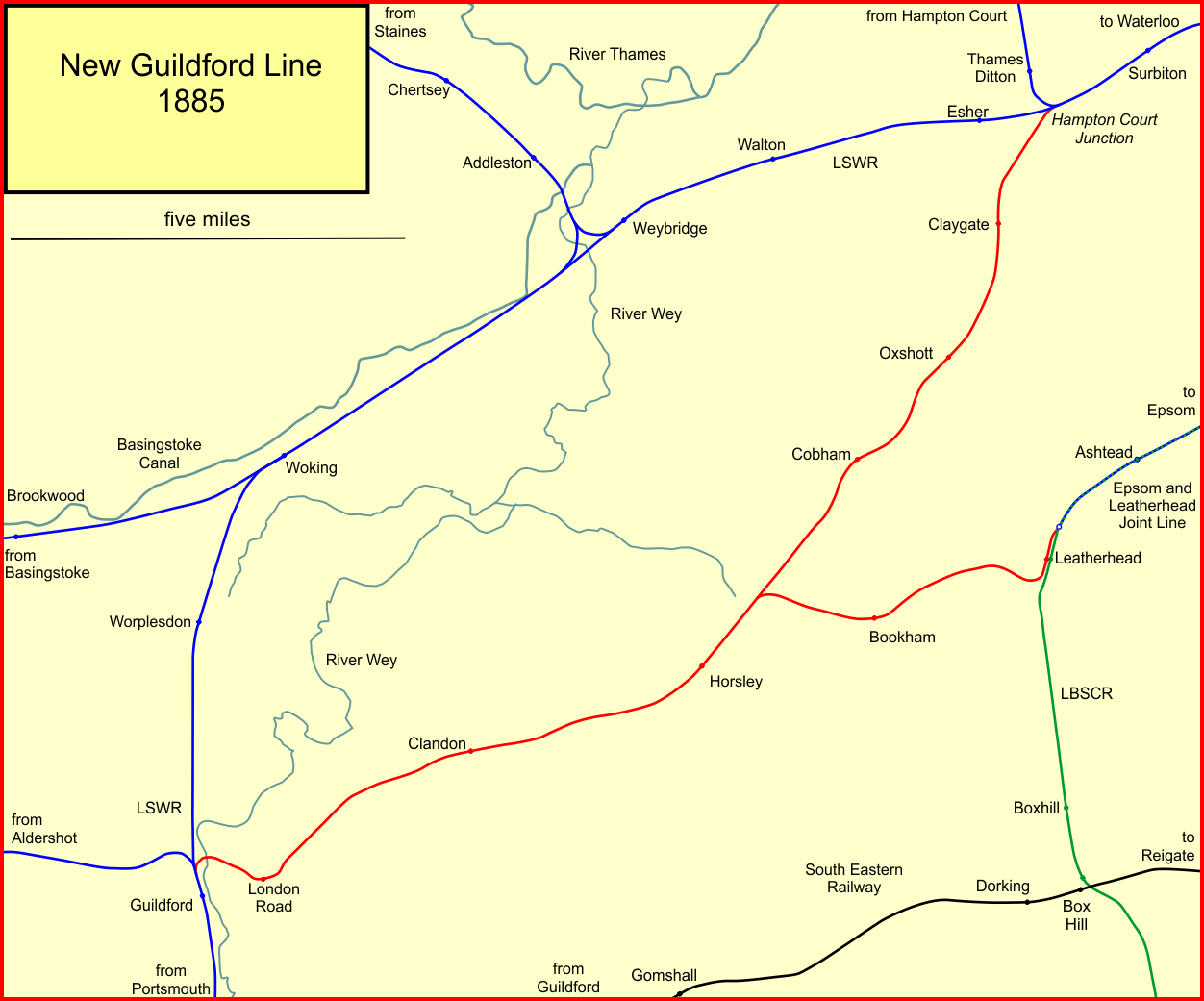
System map of the New Guildford Line

Guildford was first served by an LSWR branch line from Woking, which opened 1845. The London, Brighton and South Coast Railway penetrated from the east as far as Epsom in 1847, and the LSWR reached the town with its own line in 1859. In that year the Epsom and Leatherhead Railway opened: independent at first, it became jointly owned and operated by the LSWR and the LBSCR together. There remained a large area between the LSWR main line and the Guildford branch on the one hand, and Leatherhead and other places on the east side. There were numerous schemes to fill the gap with a railway line, in many cases using Cobham as the focus. In most cases the promoters were unable to raise sufficient support among investors.

=== Guildford, Kingston and London Railway ===
In 1880 a more ambitious scheme still was put forward: it was called the Guildford, Kingston and London Railway (GK&LR). It was to be a 25-mile (40 km) line reaching Guildford from Fulham, nowadays Putney Bridge station, on the District line, and then a terminus of the Metropolitan District Railway. It would run via Kingston and Surbiton, with branches in the Cobham area to Ashtead and to Bookham. The branches brought the total proposed extent to 31 miles (50 km). The scheme must obviously have had the connivance of the Metropolitan District Railway, although that company denied direct involvement.

The GK&LR was to have its own Surbiton station alongside the LSWR station, but also make a connection to the LSWR there. It hoped to have running powers back along the Metropolitan District Railway to South Kensington, High Street Kensington, and Addison Road (later renamed Kensington Olympia). The plan was to extend existing MDR passenger train services to Guildford. At Guildford it would have an independent station, but the line would continue into the LSWR station, and have running powers to Peasmarsh Junction, where it could connect to the LBSCR to Horsham. Moreover it would have a spur towards Ash on the South Eastern Railway line to Reading, with potential access to the LSWR Alton line. The LSWR objected strongly to these proposals, and in defence it proposed its own line from Hampton Court Junction to Guildford.

=== Comparison with the LSWR scheme ===
People in the Cobham area had long complained about the failure of the LSWR – seen as an unresponsive monopoly – to connect their town to the railway network. A public meeting was held there on 6 January 1881, to gauge support for the schemes. Negative views were expressed about the GK&LR scheme: it would cost about £1 3/4 million, partly due to the incorporation of lengthy tunnelling east of Kingston, yet it would be built to serve a sparsely populated district. It required an impractical junction with the Metropolitan District Railway, needing passengers to continue to central London over the already congested Inner Circle line by trains stopping at each station. Most significantly, while the District Railway supposedly backed the GK&LR, it had made no commitment or assistance of any kind.

=== Failure of the GK&LR ===
Both these schemes went to the 1881 session of Parliament. Two incompatible proposals spelt great difficulty for both proponents. The GKLR supporters were made to look amateurish in Parliament, when they repeatedly expressed themselves ignorant of likely business volumes. Finally on 30 May 1881 they agreed to a compromise. The GKLR agreed to limit its proposal to the Fulham to Surbiton section, to be worked jointly by the GKLR and the LSWR. The LSWR would build its Hampton Court Junction to Guildford line. The GKLR changed its (proposed) title to the Kingston and London Railway. The South Western Railway Act 1881 (44 & 45 Vict. c. ccix) and the Kingston and London Railway Act 1881 (44 & 45 Vict. c. ccxii) were authorised on 22 August 1881.

It was necessary now for the LSWR to obtain powers to take a 50% share in the Kingston and London Railway; this was authorised by the London and South-Western and District Railway Companies (Kingston and London Railway) Act 1882 (45 & 46 Vict. c. ccxlviii). There was a joint committee of LSWR and Metropolitan District Railway representatives. The Corporation of Kingston was displeased to be excluded from the process, and for the LSWR (for which it held negative feelings) to be in charge. The 1882 act included powers for junctions from the new line Surbiton, Norbiton and Putney, and to make a spur to a new LSWR terminal at Pelham Street, Kensington.

The construction of the Kingston and London Railway would cost £650,000, to be shared equally between the LSWR and the K&LR shareholders. The K&LR quickly found it impossible to generate the necessary share subscriptions. An extension of time was obtained in the South Western and District Railways Act 1884 (47 & 48 Vict. c. cclix), but in October 1885 it was decided that it was impossible to continue. The residual Putney Bridge to East Putney section of the K&LR was therefore included in the South Western Railway Act 1886 (49 & 50 Vict. c. cx). This was simply a crossing of the River Thames, and it was incorporated into the Wimbledon and West Metropolitan Junction scheme, authorised in that act. The remainder of the K&LR was abandoned by virtue of the same act.

The Leatherhead branch was not included in the South Western Railway Act 1881 due to sensitivities over the line crossing Bookham Common, but was instead authorised in the South-western Railway Act 1882 (45 & 46 Vict. c. ccxi), this time with tunnelling to protect the common.

=== Construction and opening ===
The lines were constructed by Lucas and Aird. The company had already signed a contract with the GKLR, which was transferred to the LSWR. Since the LSWR scheme did not include the section between Hampton Court Junction and Putney, the new agreement awarded the builders a right to compensation for the costs that they had incurred in preparing to build the northern part of the GKLR line. Many of the bridges on the line were built using bricks from the Littlefield Brickfields near Oxshott.

The New Guildford line and Bookham branch line opened on 2 February 1885, with intermediate stations at Claygate, Oxshott, Cobham and Stoke d'Abernon, Horsley, Clandon and London Road (Guildford). The initial passenger service between London Waterloo and Guildford was six trains per day (tpd) via Cobham, and five tpd via Bookham. Typical journey times were around 1 hour 25 minutes via Cobham and 1 hour 30 minutes via Bookham. From the outset, LSWR tickets from Guildford to London were valid on all three of the company's routes (via Woking, Cobham and Bookham).

Landowners in the area served by the railway began to sell parts of their estates for housebuilding. Development of Lord Foley's land at Claygate began as soon as the line opened. (Note: The population of Claygate increased from 750 in 1881 to 2,800 in 1914.) Larger houses were built between Cobham and Oxshott, where the 200-acre (81 ha) Fairmile estate was auctioned in 1886. Development of the north-eastern suburbs of Guildford began in 1885 on land previously owned by Lord Onslow. (Note: The landowners also benefited from selling the land for the new railway to the LSWR: The Earl of Lovelace, received a profit of £8,000 in 1883 (equivalent to £0.8 million in 2023) for the site of Horsley station, and Lord Onslow was paid £52,000 (£5.23 million in 2023) for land in the Guildford area.)

=== Early 20th century ===
Although the South West Main Line had been widened to four tracks between Surbiton and Hampton Court Junction in 1883, the junction with the New Guildford line was arranged so that trains from Cobham were required to cross the path of those travelling westwards on the main line. The conflicting movements were eliminated with the construction of a diveunder at the junction, which opened on 21 October 1908. Authorised by the South Western Railway Act 1906, the total cost of the scheme was £12,611 (equivalent to £1.26 million in 2023). The works included the construction of a new, 70 ch-long (1,400 m) up line, allowing northbound trains from Cobham to pass beneath the main line.

In 1913, the LSWR announced that it would electrify much of its suburban network using the third-rail system. The project would initially focus on the lines via Hounslow and Kingston, but the company's three routes to Guildford (via Woking, Cobham and Bookham) were to be part of the second phase. Nevertheless, a short section of the New Guildford line between Hampton Court Junction and Claygate was electrified as part of the first stage, allowing an electric semi-fast service to operate between London and Surbiton. Half-hourly electric train services between Waterloo and Claygate began running on 20 November 1916, calling at all intermediate stations except Vauxhall, Earlsfield and Raynes Park. For much of the day, the hourly steam-hauled service from Guildford via Cobham terminated at Claygate, where passengers were required to transfer to the electric services to reach Waterloo, although through trains continued to operate at peak times. The electric Claygate trains were withdrawn in July 1919 and the stock was redeployed to strengthen services running via Kingston. The LSWR board approved the extension of electrification to Guildford via Cobham in March 1922, but equipment suppliers and installers were unable to guarantee prices for the work and so the scheme did not proceed.

Under the Railways Act 1921, the LSWR became part of the Southern Railway (SR) on 1 January 1923. On 6 December that year, the SR authorised the electrification of 67 track miles in west Surrey, including the lines to Guildford via Cobham and Bookham. (Note: The electrification scheme authorised in December 1923 had a total cost of £833,000 (equivalent to £41.68 million in 2023) and also included the line from Leatherhead to Dorking.) Four new substations, fed from the Durnsford Road power station in Wimbledon, were installed on the New Guildford line. (Note: The substations at Effingham Junction and Guildford both contained two 1250kW converters; those at Oxshott and Clandon had one 1250kW each.) The platforms at most stations (except Horsley, Clandon and London Road (Guildford)) were lengthened to 520 ft (160 m) to accommodate the 8-car trains that were to be used at peak times. Electrified berthing sidings were provided at Guildford and a seven-road carriage shed was built on the site of the former steam locomotive shed at Effingham Junction. (Note: The new carriage shed at Effingham Junction had seven roads, which were capable of accommodating eight-car units, except for the centre road, which could only hold a four-car unit. Construction of the shed began on 26 March 1925, but it had not been completed by the time public electric trains began running on 12 July.) A new signal box was constructed at Effingham Junction, opening on 11 July 1925, replacing the original box opened in 1885. A bay platform at Guildford (now Platform 1) was also built to accommodate terminating electric trains.

A formal ceremony to inaugurate the new services between London Waterloo and Guildford took place on 9 July 1925 and the first public electric trains ran three days later. The initial service between London Waterloo and Guildford was three trains per hour (tph) via Cobham and one tph via Epsom. From 1 December 1925, the services running via Cobham ran non-stop along the fast tracks of the South West Main Line between Waterloo and Surbiton. The new trains were popular and, in the four years to 1929, passenger numbers on the newly electrified routes increased by 25% and ticket receipts rose by 38%.

When the SR was formed in 1923, it had inherited two stations at Leatherhead, one that had been built by the LB&SCR and one by the LSWR. Electric trains to-and-from Bookham could only access the LSWR station, and so a new junction was created at the south end of the LB&SCR station. The former LSWR station closed on 9 July 1927, leaving the former LB&SCR facility to handle all trains serving Leatherhead. The new track layout enabled the launch of electric train services between London Victoria and Effingham Junction via Bookham on 3 March 1929.

Housebuilding along the lines continued in the first half of the 20th century. The Crown estate, which owned land in Oxshott, began to release plots to developers in the 1920s. New housing estates were built at Hinchley Wood, where the construction of the station was financed by the local landowner. The new station, which opened on 20 October 1930, consisted of an island platform, built where the lines diverged to approach Hampton Court Junction. The platforms at Horsley, Clandon and London Road (Guildford) were lengthened to 520 ft (160 m) in the late 1930s to allow a wider range of rolling stock to operate longer trains during peak periods.

=== Late 20th century ===
Resignalling of the line, including the installation of colour light signals, took place in the late 1960s and early 1970s. The signal boxes at Horsley and Clandon closed with control of their areas transferred to Guildford Panel Box in April 1966. (Note: The signal box at London Road (Guildford) was initially retained after the April 1966 resignalling to control the sidings at the station.) Three years later, the boxes at Bookham and Effingham Junction closed, with the lines south of Cobham and Bookham coming under the control of Guildford Panel Box. The north end of the line was transferred to the control of Surbiton Panel Box in March 1970, and the section from Oxshott to Cobham followed in September 1972. The signal box at Leatherhead was closed in August 1990 as part of the Waterloo Area Resignalling Scheme and, in April 1998, Surbiton Panel Box closed with its functions transferred to a new signalling centre at Woking.

In the early 1980s, British Rail considered singling the Bookham branch line as an economy measure, but decided not to pursue the scheme in July 1986. The carriage shed at Effingham Junction ceased to be used to stable stock in 1993.

New service patterns were introduced in the early 1990s, with the introduction of half-hourly Thameslink trains between Luton and Guildford. The new service ran fast from Leatherhead to Guildford calling only at Effingham Junction. For the first year, the existing all-stations Waterloo-Effingham Junction trains continued to run, but were withdrawn outside of peak times in May 1991, with a Bookham call added to the Thameslink services instead. Bookham residents protested the loss of their hourly, direct, off-peak trains to London, which were reinstated in May 1994. In the same month the Thameslink services to Guildford were withdrawn due to low patronage.

== Stations and locations ==
=== Main line ===
- Hampton Court Junction;
- Hinchley Wood; opened 20 October 1930
- Claygate, opened 2 February 1885
- Oxshott; opened 2 February 1885
- Cobham & Stoke d’Abernon; opened 2 February 1885
- Effingham Junction; opened 2 July 1888
- Horsley; opened 2 February 1885; still open
- Clandon & Ripley; opened 2 February 1885; renamed Clandon 1910
- London Road; opened 2 February 1885; renamed London Road, Guildford 9 July 1923
- Guildford; LSWR main line station; opened 5 May 1845

=== Leatherhead branch ===
- Leatherhead; LSWR station opened 4 March 1867; closed 10 July 1927, when trains were diverted to the former LBSCR station, still open
- Bookham; opened 2 February 1885
- Effingham Junction; above.

== Passenger rolling stock ==
The first electric multiple units to run on the New Guildford line were used to operate Waterloo–Claygate services between 1916 and 1919. The three-car units had both first- and third-class seating, and were created by converting existing steam-hauled carriages. (Note: The 84 electric multiple units created for the LSWR electrification schemes of the 1910s were maintained at Wimbledon depot and were numbered E1 to E84. In each unit, the centre car was unpowered and the driving cars were both equipped with two 275 hp motors.) When the remainder of the New Guildford line was electrified in 1923–1925, 26 new three-car units were constructed to allow the new services to operate. The units were designed to be compatible with those created for the LSWR electrification schemes of the 1910s, with which they interworked. At the same time, 13 unpowered two-car units were formed by converting steam-hauled carriages originally built by the LB&SCR. The two-car units could be coupled between a pair of three-car units, allowing peak services to be run with eight cars. (Note: The 26 new electric multiple units constructed for the 1923–1925 electrification of the New Guildford line had a total length of 181 feet 8 inches (55.37 m). The Southern Railway (SR) had initially intended to construct units that were 193 feet 8 inches (59.03 m) long, to match those being built for the electrification of the lines between London Victoria, Holborn Viaduct, Dartford and Orpington. However, Herbert Jones, the SR Chief Electrical Engineer, insisted that the units be shorter, citing concerns over the strength of the bridges on the New Guildford line.)

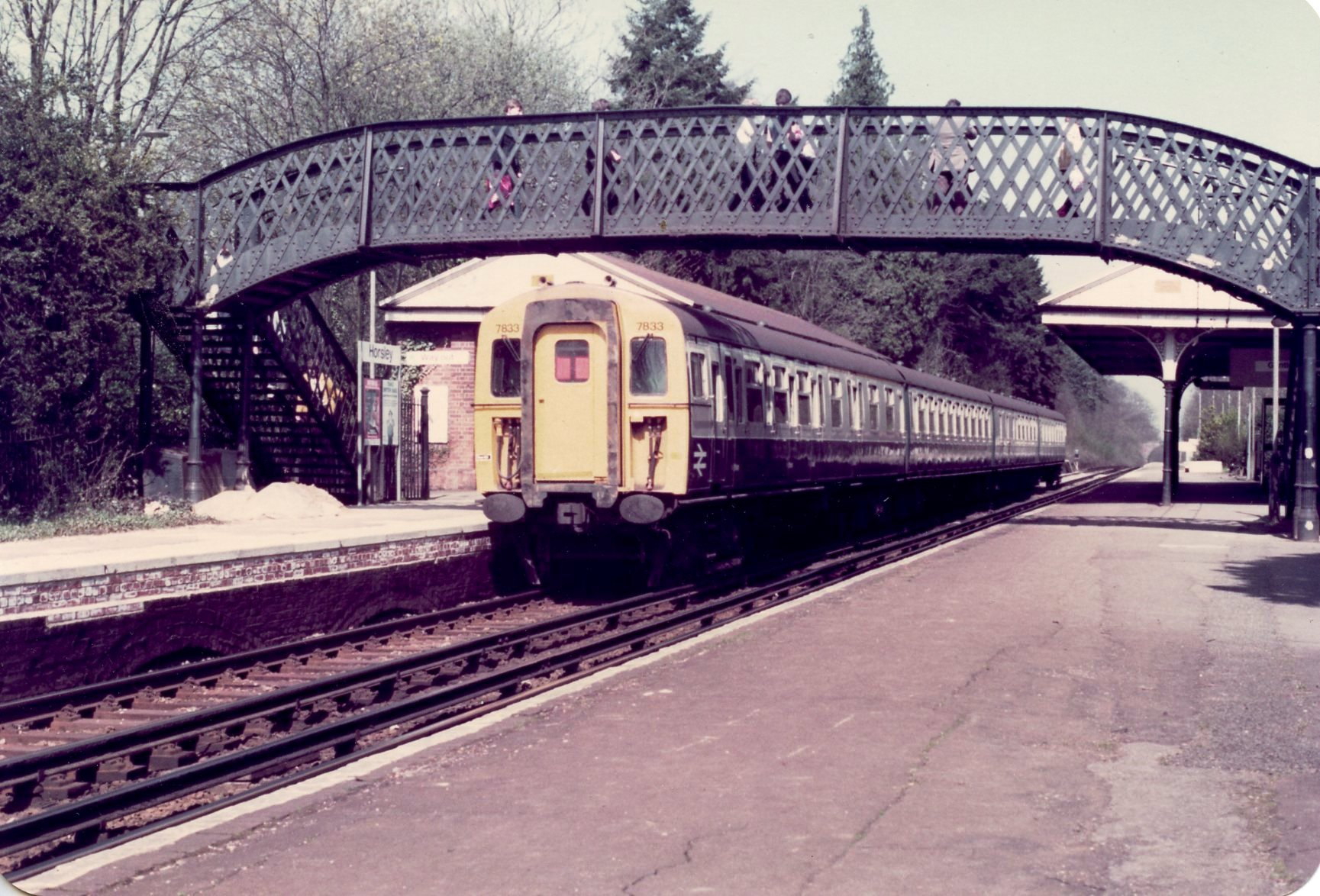
A Class 423 (4-VEP) at Horsley in 1983

First class was removed from the three-car trains running on New Guildford line on 6 October 1941, as a wartime measure, following an announcement by Frederick Leathers, the Minister of War Transport. During the 1940s, the units were lengthened to four cars and were classified, along with new-build four-car units, as 4-SUBs. In 1952, the New Guildford line was the first line on which Class 415s (originally called 4-EPBs) were used, initially running on Waterloo–Guildford via Cobham services. For 20 years, these trains operated the majority of passenger services, until they were briefly replaced by 4-SUBs in May 1973. The 4-SUBs were in turn replaced by Class 423 (4-VEPs) that October, reintroducing first class accommodation to the line for the first time since the Second World War. The new trains were unpopular with regular commuters, as the first-class accommodation reduced the number of standard-class seats available by around 25%.

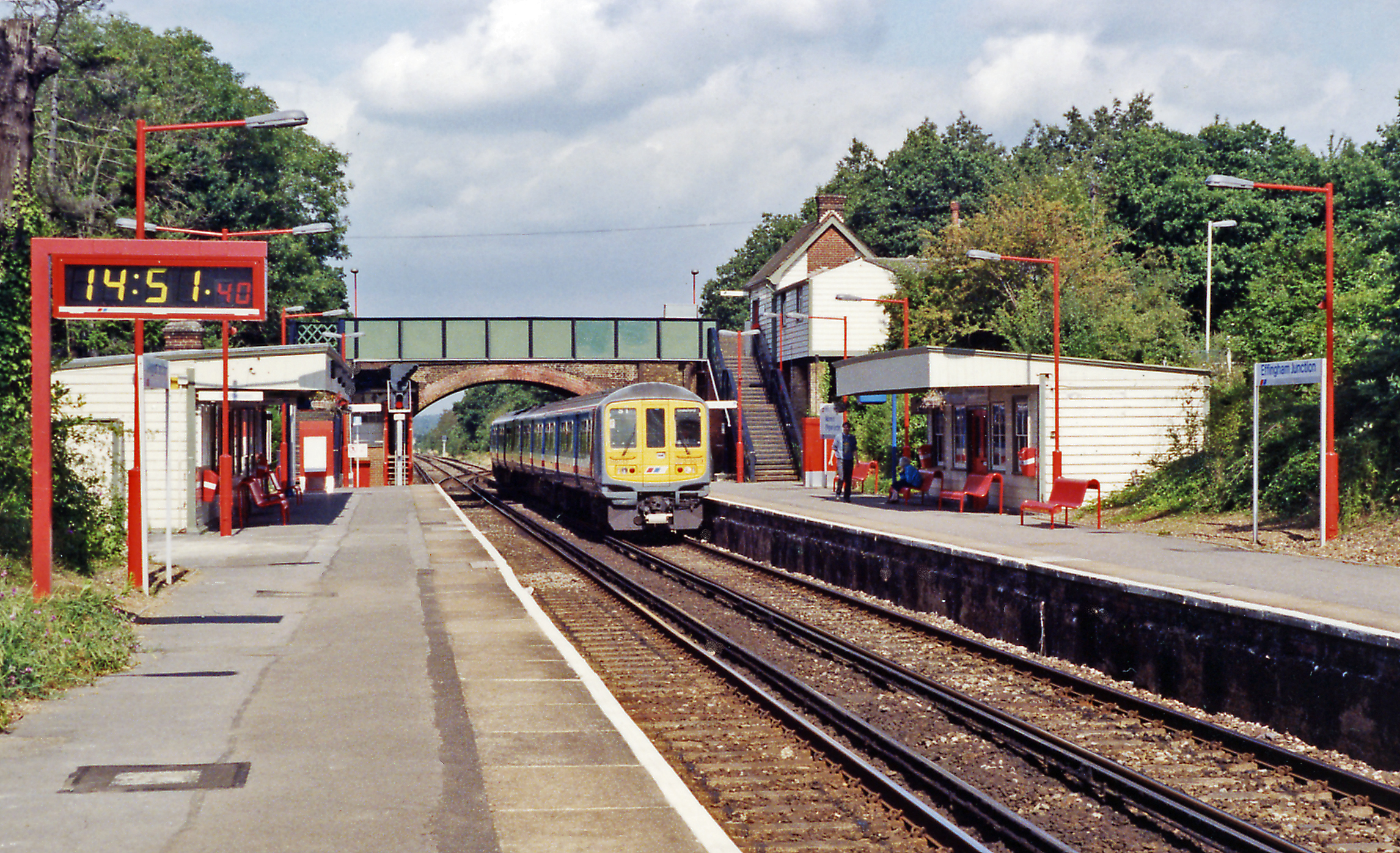
A Class 319 at Effingham Junction operating a Thameslink service to Guildford in 1991

Class 508 electric multiple units were introduced to the New Guildford line in 1979. Class 455s arrived in mid-May 1983, initially operating services between Waterloo and Effingham Junction via Bookham. As these units began to enter squadron service, the Class 508s were progressively transferred to operate Merseyrail services in North West England. The final Class 508 units were relocated to the Liverpool area in December 1984. Class 319s operated the Luton–Guildford Thameslink service between 1990 and 1994.

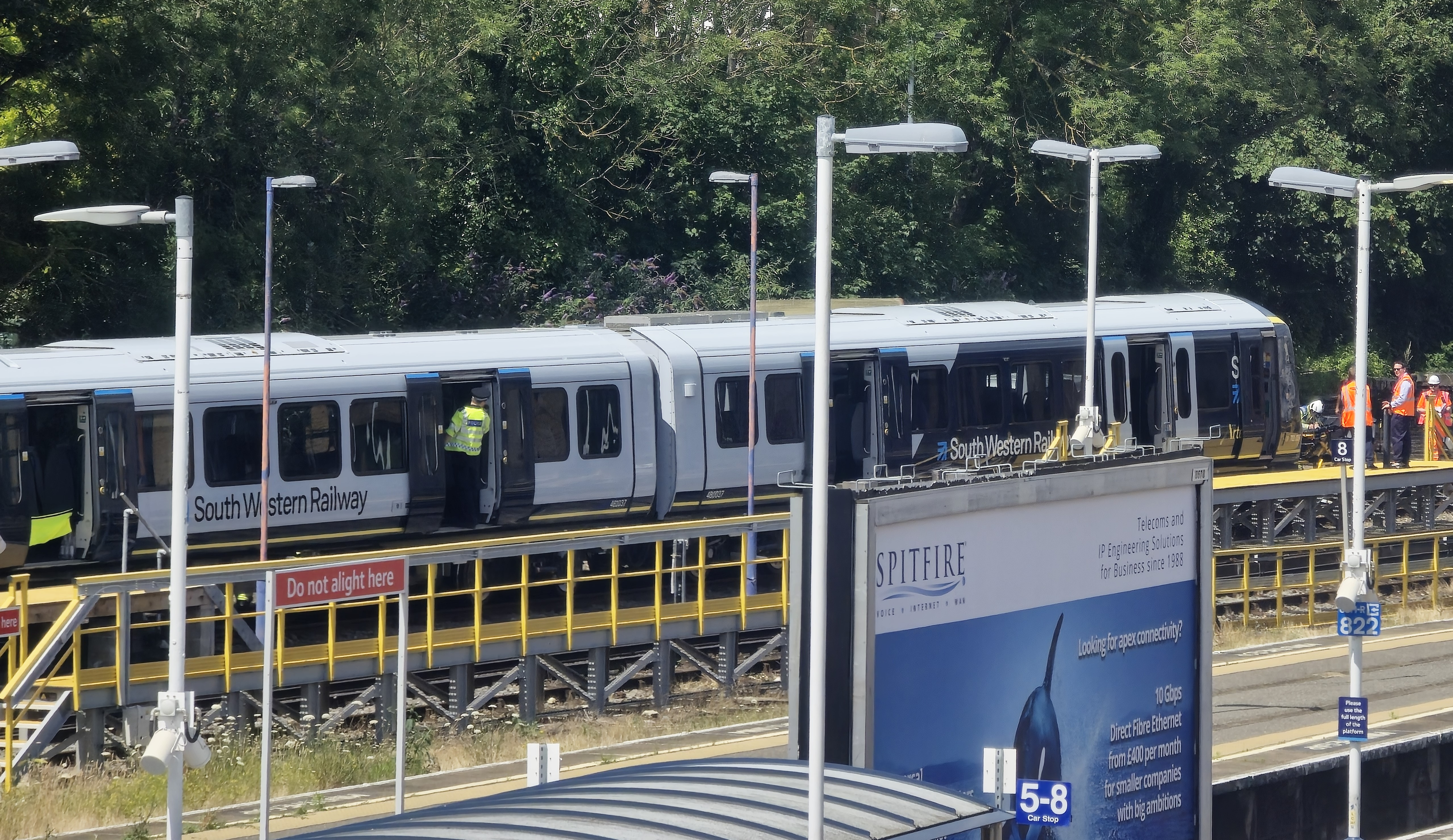
A Class 701 at Guildford sidings during testing on 11 July 2024

The first Class 701 in passenger service arrived at Guildford at 16:02 on 4 June 2024 and departed at 16:28 to London Waterloo via Leatherhead.

== Freight ==
When the New Guildford and Bookham branch lines opened in 1885, public freight yards were provided at Claygate, Oxshott, Cobham, Bookham, Horsley, Clandon and London Road stations. There was also a public goods siding at Merrow, accessible from Merrow Lane, alongside a private siding for the use of the Earl of Onslow. A private siding and enclosed coal depot was also constructed by the LSWR for the Earl of Lovelace at Horsley. No goods facilities were ever provided at Hinchley Wood.

In 1959, a goods service ran three days a week between Surbiton and Guildford, generally hauled by SR U, SR Q1 or LSWR 700 class steam locomotives. A Leatherhead–Guildford service also operated, hauled by an SR Q or an LB&SCR C2x engine. In 1961, a return goods train was timetabled to run on the New Guildford line six days per week, Monday–Saturday, but David Fereday Glenn, a railway historian, reports that the services often only ran on Tuesdays, Thursdays and Saturdays. He notes that in the early 1960s, freight services were the only trains that were regularly hauled by steam locomotives, for which SR U1 and LB&SCR C2x class engines were typically used. By 1964, the regular goods service had been reduced to a Surbiton–Cobham train running once a week on Tuesdays only. A Q1 class locomotive is recorded hauling a Surbiton–Guildford coal train along the line in 1965.

The first public goods yard on the lines to close, in September 1959, was at Oxshott station, and a car park was built in its place. Public freight services to the siding at Merrow were withdrawn on 16 March 1960, although the private facility was used by Surrey County Council until 25 June the following year. The yards at Clandon and Claygate were closed in 1963, and the site at Claygate goods yard was used for a car park extension. A small housing estate was built on the site of the former yard at Horsley, which closed in May 1964. Freight facilities were withdrawn in May 1965 at Bookham and Cobham, and the final yard on the lines, at London Road (Guildford) closed in January 1969.

== Accidents and incidents ==
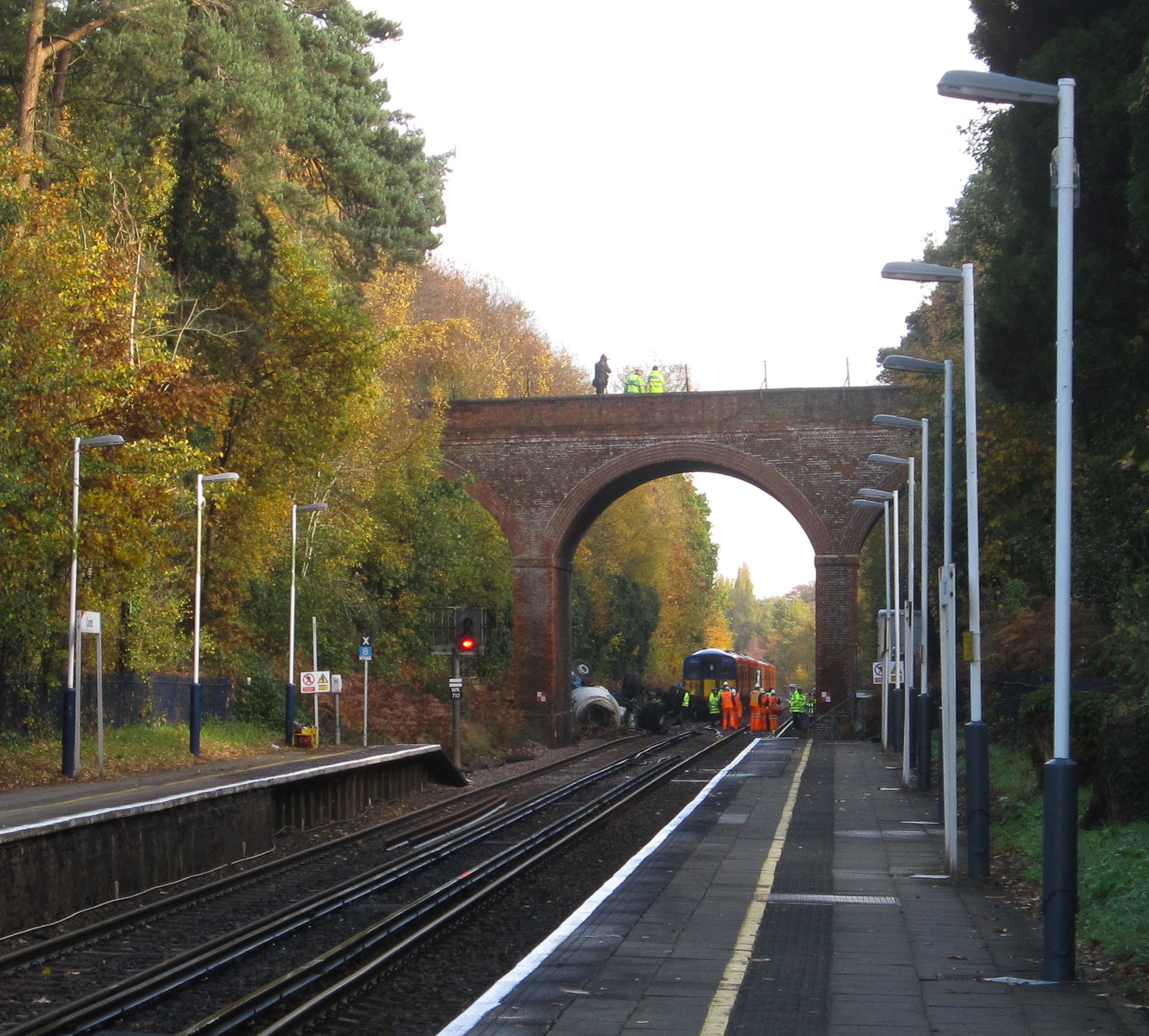
The scene of the Oxshott rail accident looking north from Oxshott station on 6 November 2010

- 25 August 1902: An Adams 0-4-2 locomotive, hauling an express passenger train from Portsmouth to London, derailed between Claygate and Hampton Court Junction.
- 16, 23 and 31 July 1925: Three separate trains collided with the buffer stop at Guildford station, shortly after the introduction of electric passenger services. A report by G. L. Hall, issued the following month, blamed the accidents on the drivers' lack of experience with the brake equipment of the new trains.
- 18 September 1953: A train ran through the buffer stop at Guildford station and crashed through the wall of the stationmaster's office. Three members of railway staff were hospitalised, including a relief assistant stationmaster, who later died of his injuries.
- 15 September 1968: Slyfield railway bridge, over the River Mole between Cobham and Effingham Junction, was severely damaged during the Great Flood of 1968. A temporary bridge was constructed to allow passenger trains to run the full length of the line from 23 September. A new concrete bridge, on the site of the original, was opened on 1 February 1970.
- 5 November 2010 Oxshott rail accident: A cement mixer lorry crashed through a bridge parapet and fell onto a Class 455 unit passing below. The train was working a service to London Waterloo and had left Oxshott station shortly before the accident. One carriage was crushed and three others were damaged. The lorry driver and six passengers were injured.
- 7 July 2017: An underfloor equipment case beneath one of the carriages of a Class 455 unit exploded at Guildford station as it departed for Waterloo via Cobham.
- 4 January 2019: A man was stabbed in the neck by another passenger between London Road (Guildford) and Clandon stations. The attacker disembarked at Clandon, but the train continued to Horsley, where emergency services were called and the victim died.

== Bibliography ==
- Brown, David (2009). Development of the London Suburban Network and Its Trains. Southern Electric. Vol. 1. Crowthorne: Capital Transport Publishing. ISBN 978-1-85-414330-3.
- Brown, David (2010). Main Line Electrification, the War Years and British Railways. Southern Electric. Vol. 2. Crowthorne: Capital Transport Publishing. ISBN 978-1-85-414340-2.
- Faulkner, J.N.; Williams, R.A. (1988). The LSWR in the 20th Century. Newton Abbot: David & Charles. ISBN 978-0-71-538927-0.
- Fereday Glenn, David (1989). The Last Days of Steam in Surrey and Sussex. Gloucester: Alan Sutton. ISBN 978-0-86-299531-7.
- Field, Marion (2022). The story of Guildford (2nd ed.). Andover: Phillimore. ISBN 978-0-75-099899-4.
- Glover, John (2001). Southern Electric. Hersham: Ian Allan Ltd. ISBN 978-0-71-102807-4.
- Gough, Terry (2002). Surrey: The West of the County Past and Present. Rediscovering Railways. Kettering: Past and Present Publishing Ltd. ISBN 978-1-85-895213-0.
- Hay, Peter (1986). Steaming through Surrey. Midhurst: Middleton Press. ISBN 978-0-90-652039-0.
- Hayes, Oliver (2015). How the Steam Railways Came to Surrey. Epsom: Bretwalda Books. ISBN 978-1-91-044029-2.
- Jackson, Alan A. (1999). The Railway in Surrey. Penryn: Atlantic Transport Publishers. ISBN 978-0-90-689990-8.
- Marsden, Colin J. (1983). Southern Electric Multiple Units. Shepperton: Ian Allen Ltd. ISBN 978-0-71-101253-0.
- Marsden, Colin J. (2008). The DC Electrics. Hersham: Ian Allan Ltd. ISBN 978-0-86-093615-2.
- Mitchell, Vic; Smith, Keith (1990). Branch Lines around Effingham Junction. Midhurst: Middleton Press. ISBN 978-0-90-652074-1.
- Moody, G.T. (1979) [1957]. Southern Electric (5th ed.). Shepperton: Ian Allan Ltd. ISBN 978-0-71-100924-0.
- Quick, Michael (2023) [2001]. Railway Passenger Stations in Great Britain (PDF) (5.05 ed.). London: Railway and Canal Historical Society.
- Williams, R. A. (1973). The London & South Western Railway. Vol. 2: Growth and Consolidation. Newton Abbot: David & Charles. ISBN 978-0-71-535940-2.
