= Cobham & Stoke d'Abernon railway station =

Railway station in Surrey, England

Coordinates: 51°19′04″N 0°23′24″W

Cobham & Stoke d'Abernon
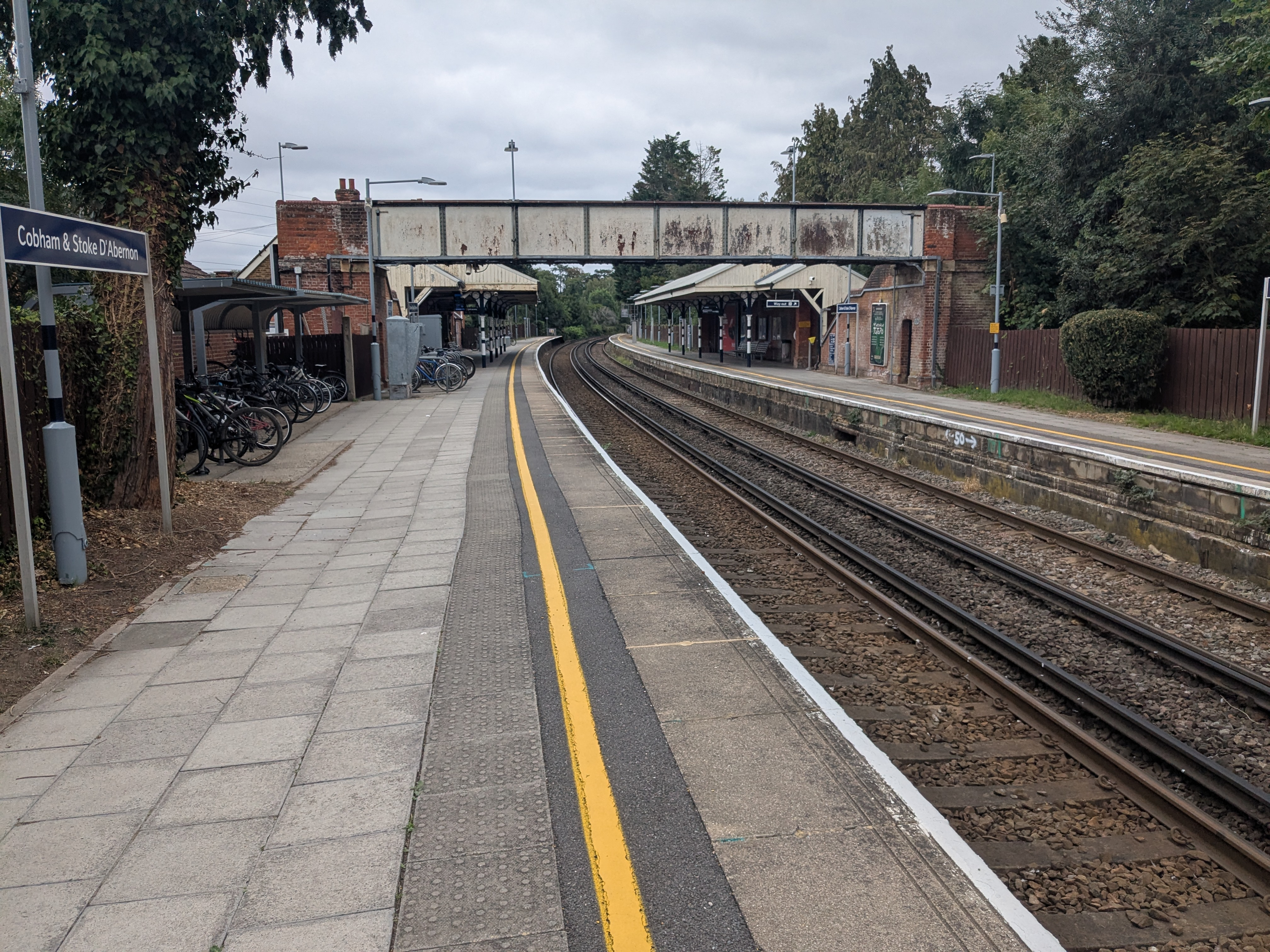
- The platforms at Cobham & Stoke D'Abernon station in August 2025

General information
- Location: Stoke d'Abernon, Elmbridge; England
- Grid reference: TQ123588
- Managed by: South Western Railway
- Platforms: 2

Other information
- Station code: CSD
- Classification: DfT category D

History
- Opened: 1885

Passengers
- 2020/21: ▼86,406
- 2021/22: ▲0.291 million
- 2022/23: ▲0.389 million
- 2023/24: ▲0.454 million
- 2024/25: ▲0.509 million
Location
Notes
- Passenger statistics from the Office of Rail and Road

Cobham & Stoke d'Abernon railway station is in the village of Stoke d'Abernon in Surrey, England and also serves the nearby town of Cobham. It is 18 miles 63 chains (30.2 km) down the line from London Waterloo.

The station, and all trains serving it, are operated by South Western Railway. It is on the New Guildford Line, and is served by trains between Waterloo and Guildford.

== History ==
The station opened in 1885.

== Services ==
Services are operated by Class 450 and Class 701 EMUs.

The typical off-peak service in trains per hour is:

- 2 tph to London Waterloo via Wimbledon
- 2 tph to Guildford

On Sundays, the service is reduced to hourly in each direction.

Preceding station	National Rail	Following station
Oxshott	South Western Railway New Guildford Line	Effingham Junction
