= Guildford railway station =

Railway station in Surrey, England

Coordinates: 51.237°N 0.580°W

Guildford
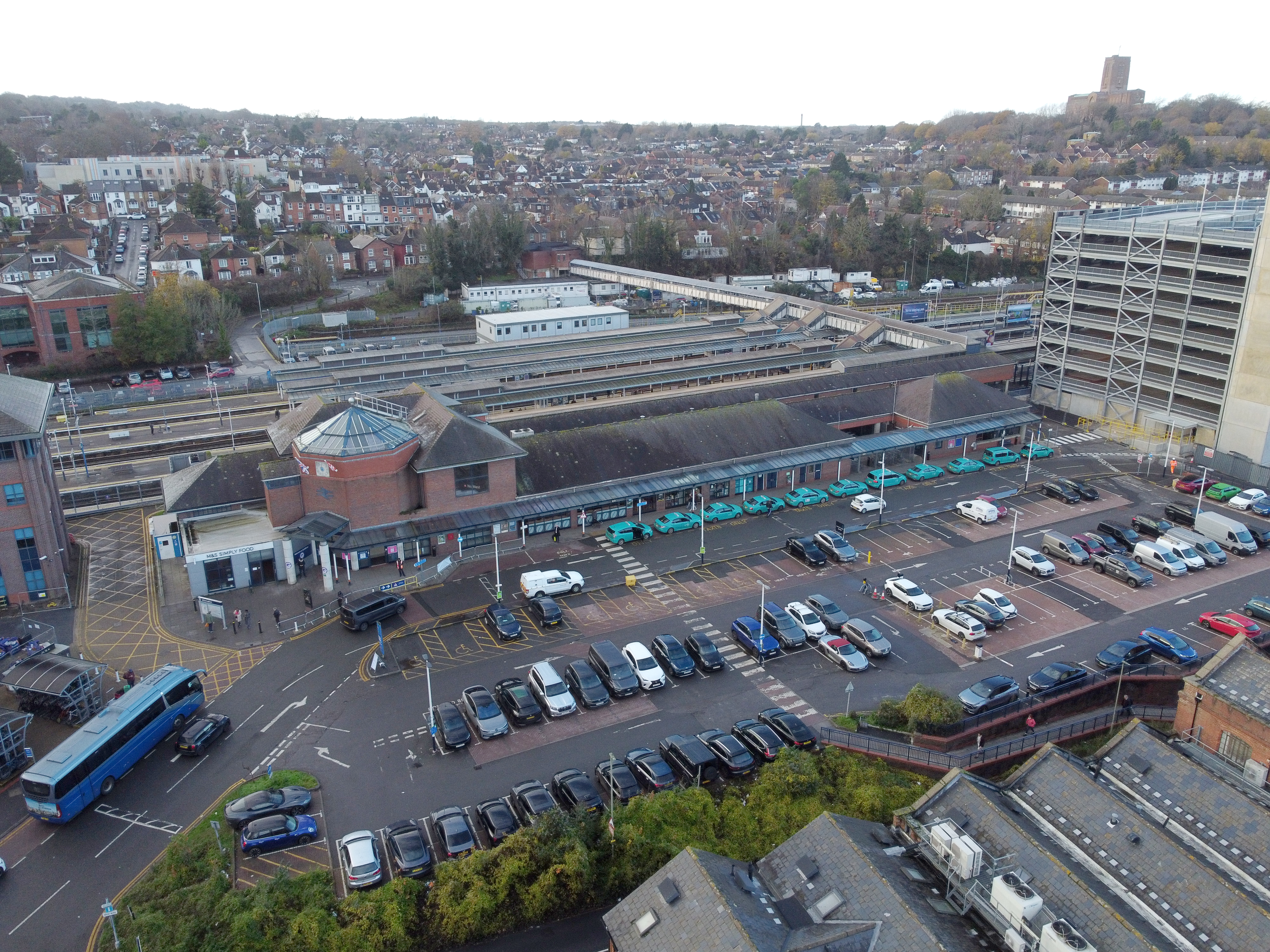

General information
- Location: Guildford, Borough of Guildford; England
- Grid reference: SU991496
- Manager: Network Rail
- Platforms: 8 (7 in use)

Other information
- Station code: GLD
- Classification: DfT category B

History
- Opened: 5 May 1845

Passengers
- 2020/21: ▼1.489 million
- Interchange: ▼0.185 million
- 2021/22: ▲4.284 million
- Interchange: ▲0.515 million
- 2022/23: ▲5.285 million
- Interchange: ▲0.681 million
- 2023/24: ▲5.884 million
- Interchange: ▲0.771 million
- 2024/25: ▲6.373 million
- Interchange: ▲0.892 million
Location
Notes
- Passenger statistics from the Office of Rail and Road

Guildford railway station is at one of three main railway junctions on the Portsmouth Direct Line and serves the town of Guildford, in Surrey, England. It is 30 miles 27 chains (30.34 mi; 48.8 km) down the line from London Waterloo via Woking.

It provides an interchange station for two other railway lines: the North Downs Line northwards towards Reading, which has a connection to Aldershot, and eastwards to Redhill; and the New Guildford Line, the alternative route to London Waterloo, via Cobham or Epsom.

Guildford station is the larger, more frequently and more diversely served of the two stations in Guildford town centre, the other being London Road (Guildford) on the New Guildford Line.

== History ==
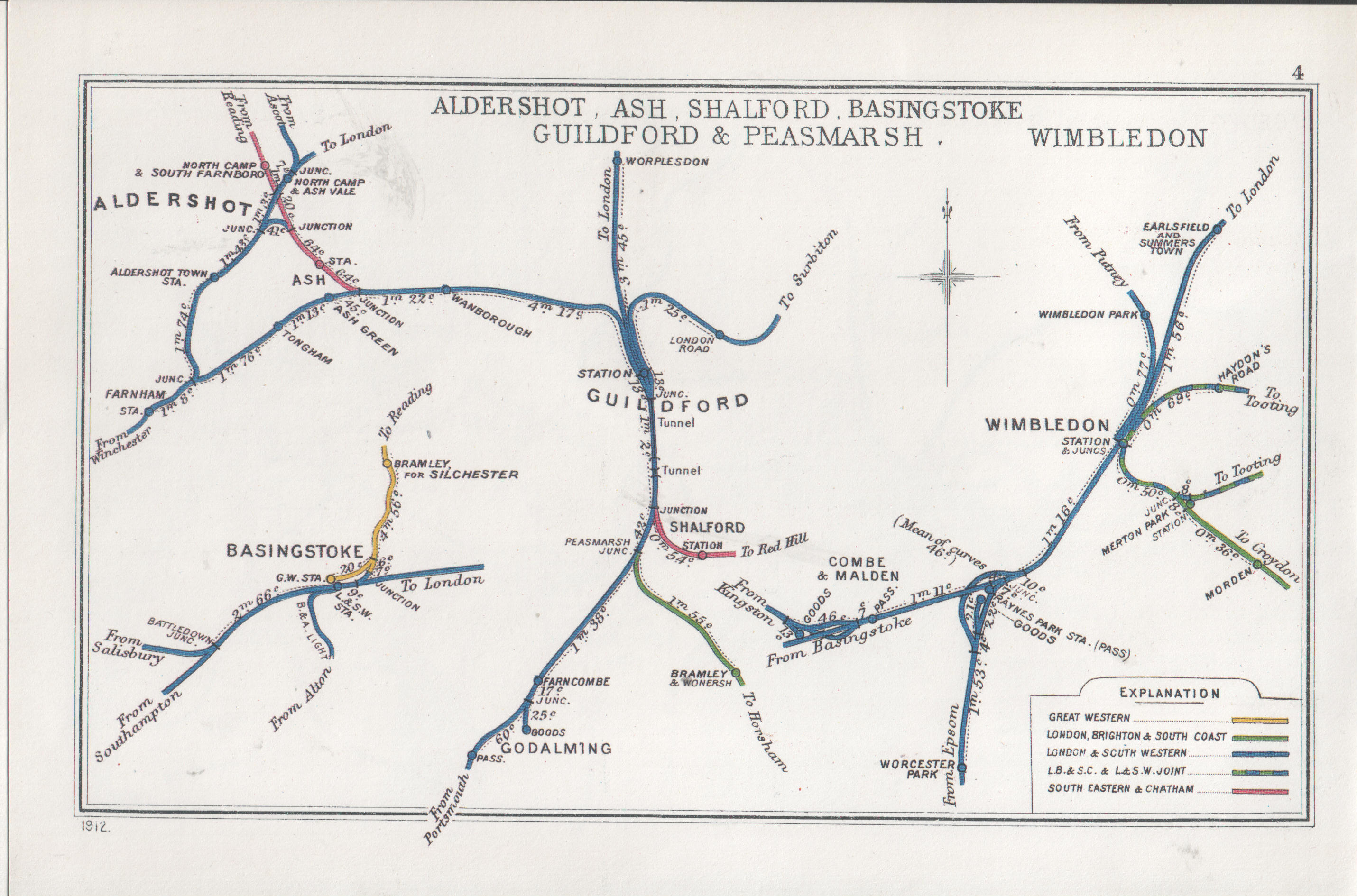
A 1912 Railway Clearing House map of lines around Guildford railway station

The station was opened by the London and South Western Railway (LSWR) on 5 May 1845, but was substantially enlarged and rebuilt in 1880.

The Reading, Guildford and Reigate Railway opened its services on 4 July 1849, and was operated by the South Eastern Railway. LSWR services to Farnham via Tongham began on 8 October 1849 and the New Guildford Line to Leatherhead and Epsom Downs on 2 February 1885. On the latter line is the other Guildford station, London Road. The line to it describes a curve around the town on an embankment, crossing the River Wey by a high bridge.

Guildford station was also the northern terminus of the former Cranleigh Line, which was opened 2 October 1865 by the London Brighton and South Coast Railway and closed almost one hundred years later on 12 June 1965. This line ran to Horsham by way of Cranleigh, Rudgwick and Christ's Hospital.

Prior to the COVID-19 pandemic, CrossCountry trains terminated, once a day, at Guildford, on their service from Newcastle-upon-Tyne.

=== Accidents and incidents ===
- On 8 November 1952, an electric multiple unit suffered a brake malfunction approaching the station. It overran signals and collided with a stationary steam locomotive. Two people were killed and 37 were injured.
- On 28 July 1971, a parcels train was derailed at the station.
- On 7 July 2017, an explosion occurred in an underframe equipment case of unit 455901 at Guildford station. Debris was thrown up to 230 feet (70 m) away with fragments, described as "quite sizeable" by the Rail Accident Investigation Branch, scattered across platforms and an adjacent car park. No injuries occurred. The cause of the explosion was a faulty capacitor which had been fitted when the unit's electrical equipment was upgraded.

=== Motive Power Depot ===
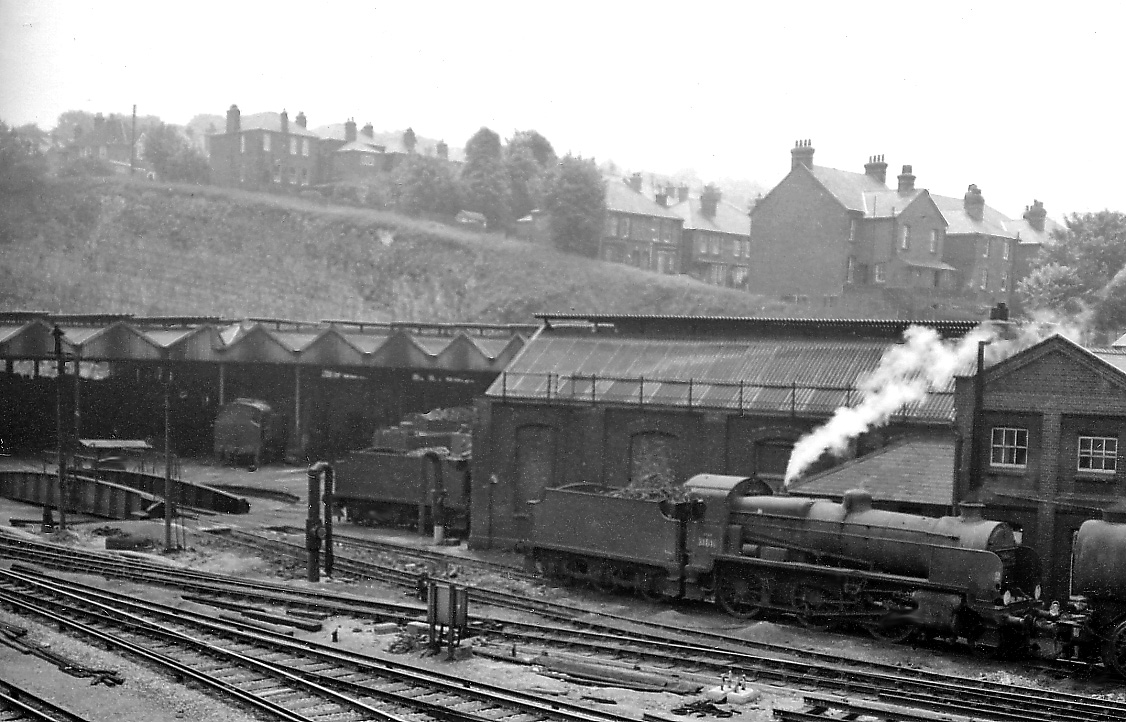
Guildford Locomotive Depot in 1965

Guildford station was the site of an important motive power depot opened by the LSWR in 1845. The original building was demolished in 1887 to make room for the enlargement of the station, and was replaced by a semi-roundhouse which was substantially enlarged in 1897. This was closed and demolished in 1967. The Farnham Road multi-storey car park was built on the site in 1988.

=== Airtrack ===
Guildford station was to have been the southern terminus for the proposed Heathrow Airtrack rail service. The project, promoted by BAA, envisaged the construction of a spur from the Waterloo to Reading Line to Heathrow Airport, creating direct rail links from the airport to Guildford, Waterloo, Woking and Reading. Airtrack was planned to open in 2015, subject to government approval. In April 2011, BAA announced that it was abandoning the project, citing the unavailability of government subsidy and other priorities for Heathrow, such as linking to Crossrail and High Speed 2.

== Platform layout ==
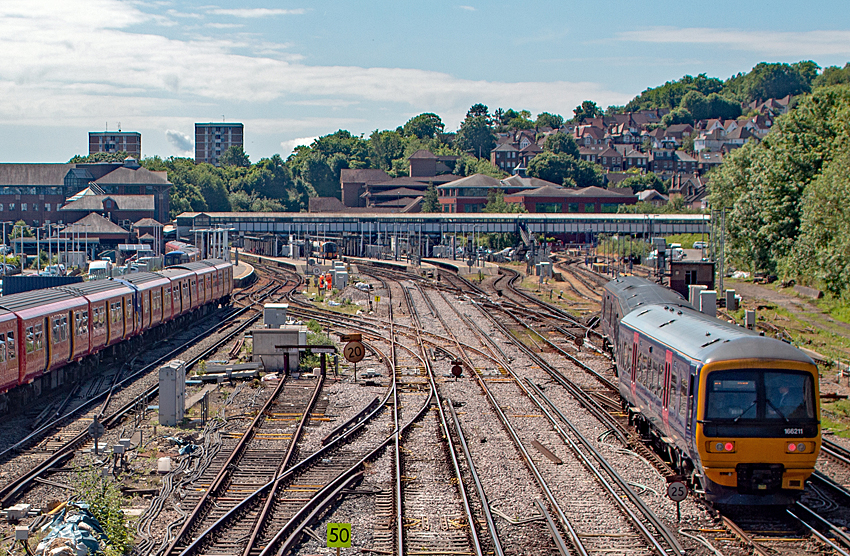
Guildford station viewed from the north

The main station buildings are on the down side. At the end of the down side platform is a bay for the New Guildford Line. There are now three islands with seven platform faces plus the bay linked by both a long footbridge and a subway. Platforms 6 and 7 are opposite sides of the same line; these were used for unloading mail and parcels until the mid-1990s. The station was completely rebuilt (except for the platforms) by British Rail in the late 1980s.

- Platform 1 – Bay platform for stopping services to London Waterloo via Epsom or Cobham
- Platform 2 – Stopping services to London Waterloo via Cobham, with a small number of services to Portsmouth & Southsea
- Platform 3 – Stopping services to London Waterloo via Epsom or Woking, with a small number of weekday services; otherwise Sundays only.
- Platform 4 – Fast and stopping services towards Portsmouth; semi-fast services to Gatwick Airport
- Platform 5 – Fast services to London Waterloo
- Platform 6 – Stopping services to Redhill/Reading and services to Ascot or Farnham via Aldershot depart from either this platform or platform 8
- Platform 7 – Platform not in use
- Platform 8 – Services to Reading and Gatwick Airport. Services to Ascot via Aldershot depart from either this platform or platform 6.

Platforms 6 and 7 are on opposite sides of the same single line. Automatic train doors only open on the platform 6 side. Today, doors are not opened on platform 7 due to the live rail being on that side, hence rendering that platform disused. Platforms 2 to 8 are signalled for bi-directional working – trains may approach from either direction.

== Services ==
Guildford is served regularly by trains operated by South Western Railway and Great Western Railway.

The typical off-peak service in trains per hour is:

- 3 tph to London Waterloo via Woking (fast)
- 2 tph to London Waterloo via Cobham (stopping)
- 1 tph to London Waterloo via Epsom (stopping)
- 1 tph to Haslemere (stopping)
- 2 tph to Portsmouth Harbour (1 fast, 1 stopping)
- 2 tph to Farnham
- 2 tph to Reading
- 2 tph to Gatwick Airport

In the peak there are additional services including one morning weekday non stop between Guildford and London Waterloo; as well as in the evening several non stop services between London Waterloo and Guildford using the New Guildford line.

Services at Guildford are operated using a mixture of rolling stock including Classes 444, 450, and 701 electric multiple units, and Class 165 and 166 diesel multiple units.

During engineering works around Basingstoke, CrossCountry trains between Manchester Piccadilly and Bournemouth divert via, and call at, Guildford.

Preceding station	National Rail	Following station
Worplesdon	South Western Railway Portsmouth Direct line	Farncombe
Woking	South Western Railway Portsmouth Direct line	Godalming
London Road (Guildford)	South Western Railway New Guildford line	Terminus
Terminus	South Western Railway Ascot to Guildford Line	Wanborough
Shalford	Great Western Railway North Downs Line	Ash
Shalford	Great Western Railway North Downs Line	Wanborough Limited Service
	Disused railways	
Terminus	Network SouthEast Thameslink	Effingham Junction
Terminus	London, Brighton and South Coast Railway Horsham and Guildford Direct Railway	Bramley & Wonersh Line and station closed
