= British Rail Class 701 =

British electric passenger train

British Rail Class 701 Arterio
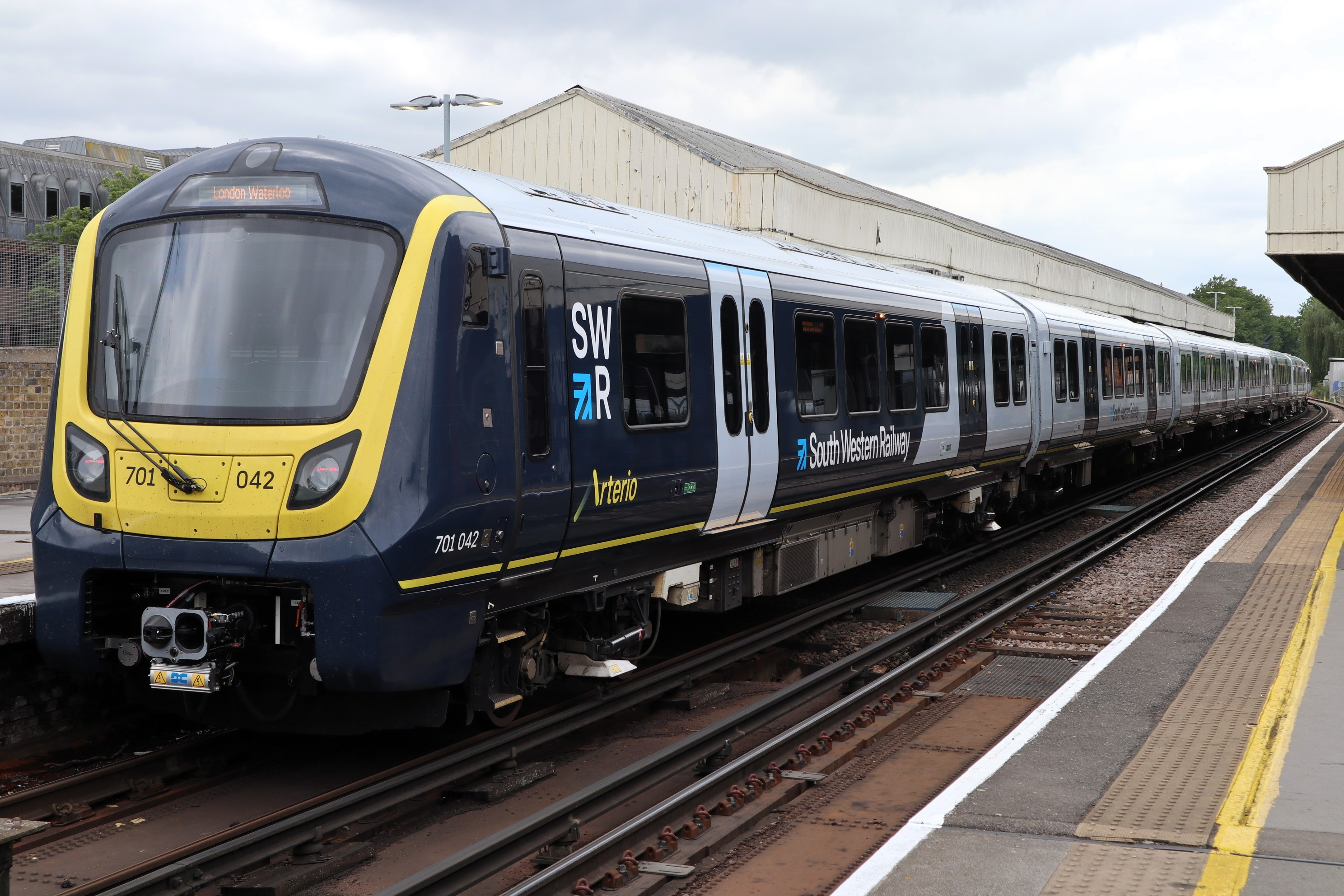
- Class 701 at Kingston

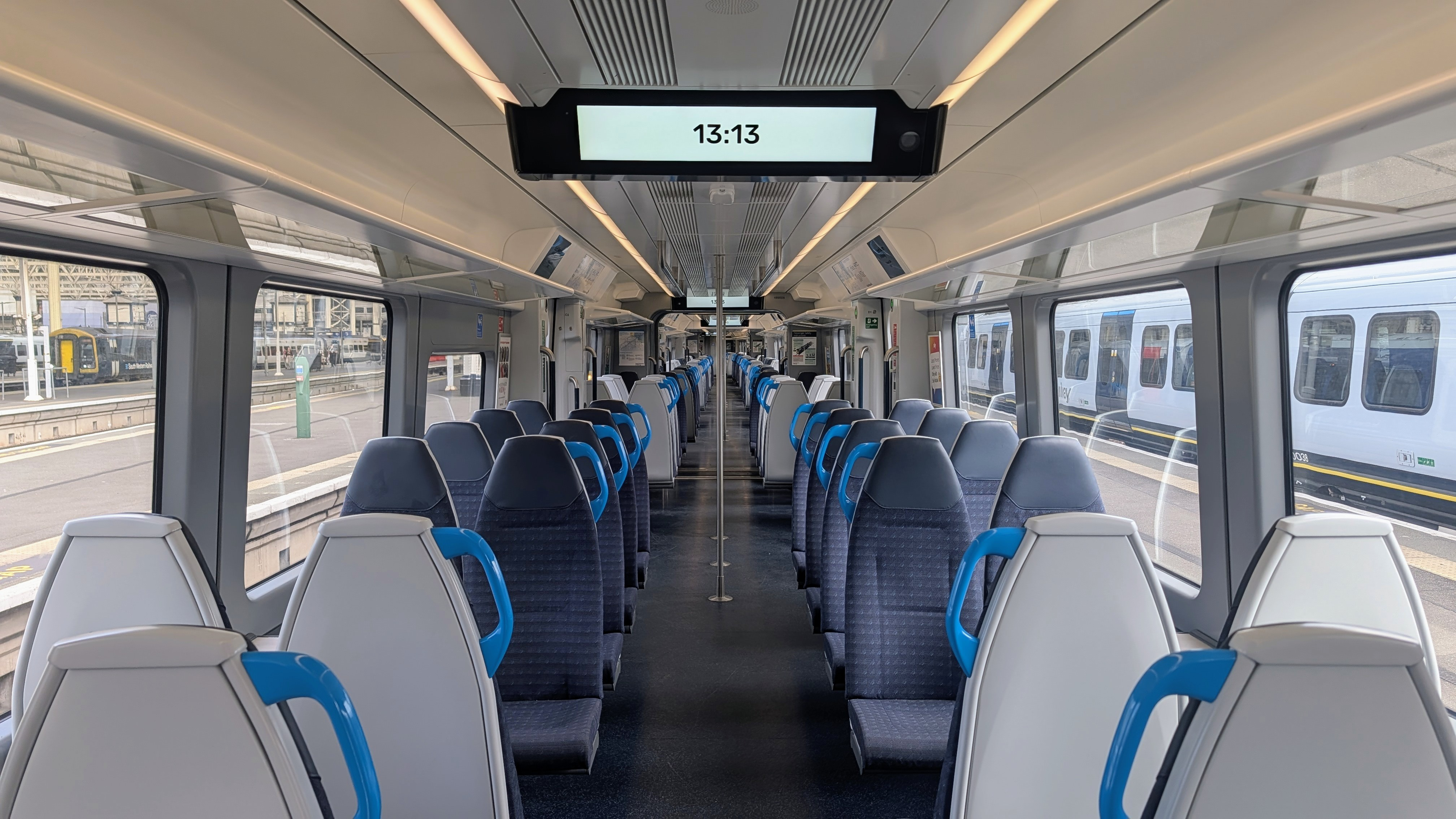
- Interior of a Class 701
- In service: 9 January 2024 – present
- Manufacturers: Bombardier Transportation; Alstom
- Built at: Derby Litchurch Lane Works
- Family name: Aventra
- Replaced: Class 455; Class 458; Class 707
- Constructed: 2019–2024
- Number built: 90
- Number in service: 30 (as of December 2025)
- Formation: 10 cars per 701/0 unit; 5 cars per 701/5 unit; (See § Fleet details)
- Fleet numbers: 701/0: 701001–701060; 701/5: 701501–701530
- Capacity: 701/0: 556 seats; plus 746 standees; 701/5: 274 seats; plus 361 standees
- Operator: South Western Railway
- Depots: Feltham; Wimbledon
- Lines served: Waterloo to Windsor; Waterloo to Reading; South West London suburban

Specifications
- Doors: Double-leaf sliding plug (2 per side per car)
- Maximum speed: 100 mph (160 km/h)
- Traction system: MITRAC IGBT–VVVF
- Traction motors: 701/0: 16 × 250 kW (340 hp); 701/5: 8 × 250 kW (340 hp)
- Power output: 701/0: 4,000 kW (5,400 hp); 701/5: 2,000 kW (2,700 hp)
- Acceleration: Maximum current: Starting: 0.96 m/s^{2} (3.1 ft/s^{2}); Reduced current: Starting: 0.7 m/s^{2} (2.3 ft/s^{2})
- Deceleration: 0.9 m/s^{2} (3.0 ft/s^{2})
- Electric systems: 750 V DC third rail
- Current collection: Contact shoe
- UIC classification: 701/0: 2′Bo′+Bo′2′+2′2′+Bo′2′+2′Bo′+2′Bo′+Bo′2′+2′2′+2′Bo′+Bo′2′; 701/5: 2′Bo′+Bo′2′+2′2′+2′Bo′+Bo′2
- Bogies: Flexx B5000
- Braking systems: Electro-pneumatic (disc) and rheostatic/regenerative
- Safety systems: AWS; TPWS; ETCS; ABDO; ASDO
- Coupling system: Dellner
- Multiple working: Within subclass /5 only
- Track gauge: 1,435 mm (4 ft 8 1/2 in) standard gauge

The British Rail Class 701 Arterio is a class of electric multiple unit passenger train built by Bombardier Transportation and Alstom at Derby Litchurch Lane Works. Built on the Aventra platform, they are operated by South Western Railway, and operate services between Waterloo and Windsor, Reading, Staines and South West London suburban lines.

Ordered in 2017, the trains were originally due to enter service from mid-2019, but were subject to several delays which prevented this. SWR began their phased entry into service from January 2024. They have allowed the withdrawal of South Western Railway's (SWR's) fleets of Class 455 and 458/5 units, and will allow the withdrawal of the 458/4 units.

== History ==
=== Background ===
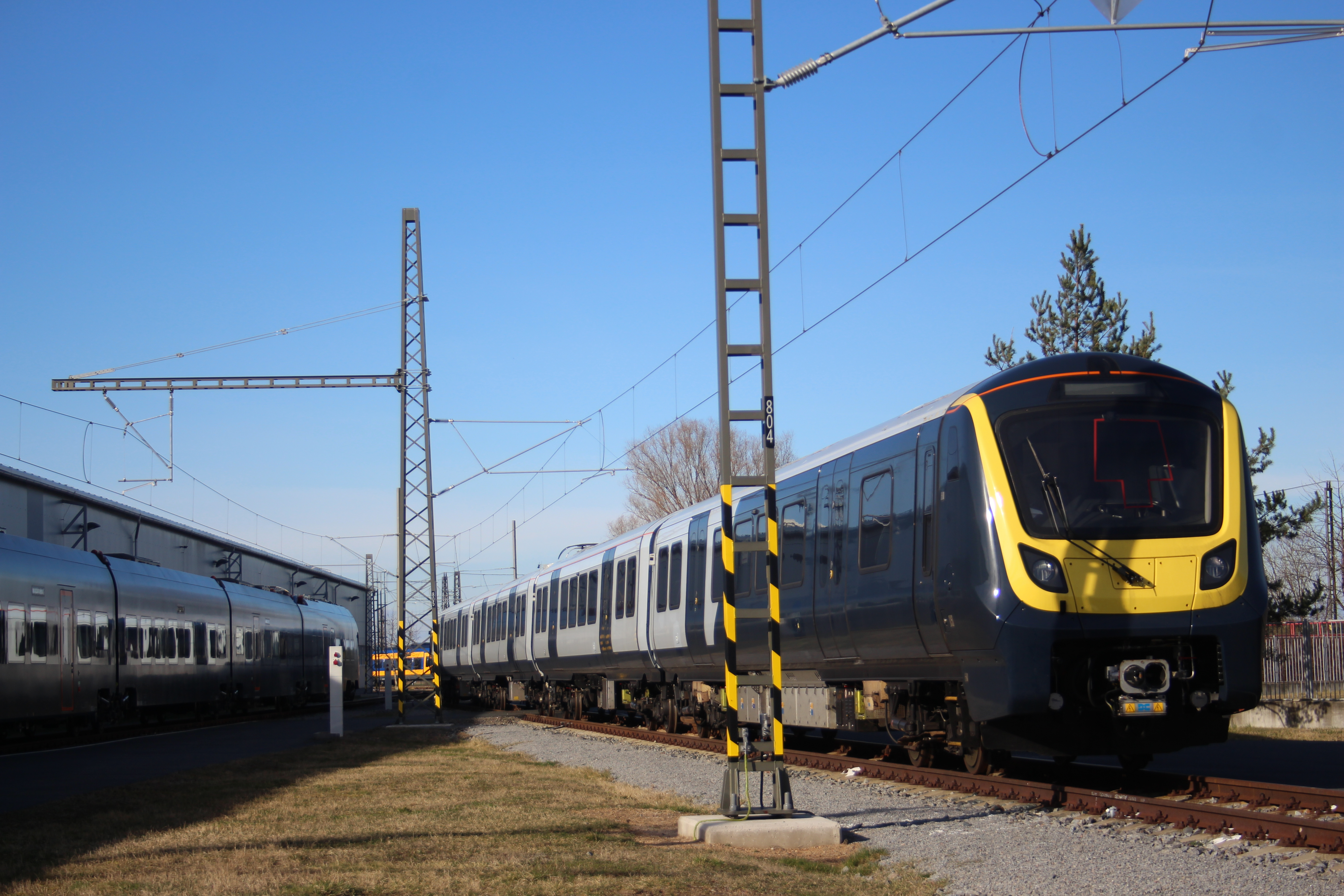
An unbranded 701/5 at Velim railway test circuit in 2020

In 2014, rail franchise operator South West Trains (SWT) ordered 30 Class 707 trains from Siemens Mobility, to allow some services to be extended to ten-cars and replace older rolling stock. A further order of trains was expected in future, to allow the suburban fleet to be replaced.

In March 2017, South Western Railway (SWR) was awarded the South Western franchise with a commitment to introduce 750 new carriages. In June 2017, SWR awarded a contract to Bombardier Transportation for 90 Aventra DC EMUs, with 60 ten-car and 30 five-car trains to be introduced from mid 2019 at a cost of £895 million. There was an option to purchase a further five ten-car units if required by October 2020. The units are maintained at Wimbledon depot and the new Feltham depot.

It was planned that the new trains would replace all of SWR's suburban fleets, which at the time of the order comprised Classes 455, 456, 458, and 707. At the time that the trains were ordered, buying a fleet of new trains was cheaper than the leasing rates for existing trains. Despite the Class 707s being brand new, they would also be replaced, as their leasing cost was around £300k more expensive.

The new trains would increase peak capacity on suburban routes into London Waterloo by 46%, as well as including improvements over existing suburban trains such as air-conditioning, an open gangway design and toilets. Original plans called for the rollout of the full fleet to take two years after the first units entered service.

=== Construction and delays ===
Following a brief halt to production in March 2020 as a result of the COVID-19 pandemic, the first completed ten-car unit (number 701002) was delivered to Eastleigh Works on 10 June 2020 so that the testing and certification processes could commence. At this point entry into service was already more than five months late. By June 2021, only 19 units had been delivered, none of which had been formally accepted by SWR.

In January 2022, SWR announced that continued delays to the Class 701 introduction had "created a challenging situation" on its suburban network, and that it was still waiting for Alstom (which acquired Bombardier Transportation in January 2021) to "supply a train that performs to specification". This caused SWR to extend the lease on its remaining 12 Class 707 units until late 2022, which in turn delayed their planned transfer to Southeastern. The Class 456 fleet was withdrawn without replacement in January 2022 following cuts to service levels.

In January 2022, Railway industry journalist Roger Ford observed that the programme met the "ultimate standard for lateness", given that none of the finished units had yet been accepted by SWR and at least 280 vehicles had not yet even been built—while the original contract specified that the entire fleet was to be in service by the end of 2021. He noted that the delay was, in part, due to "endemic software issues" that had affected the introduction of all Aventra fleets to date. Other issues include complaints from driver's union ASLEF that the cab environment in the production units differs unacceptably from the standard previously agreed with SWR, and a high level of manufacturing defects in the finished vehicles.

SWR's Business Plan for 2022–2023, published in July 2022, acknowledged that "continuing problems ... have prevented the start of driver training and delayed the programme of train acceptance", and included a commitment to "introduce the new Arterio fleet as soon as possible". This will involve SWR agreeing on new roll-out milestones for the project with the Department for Transport.

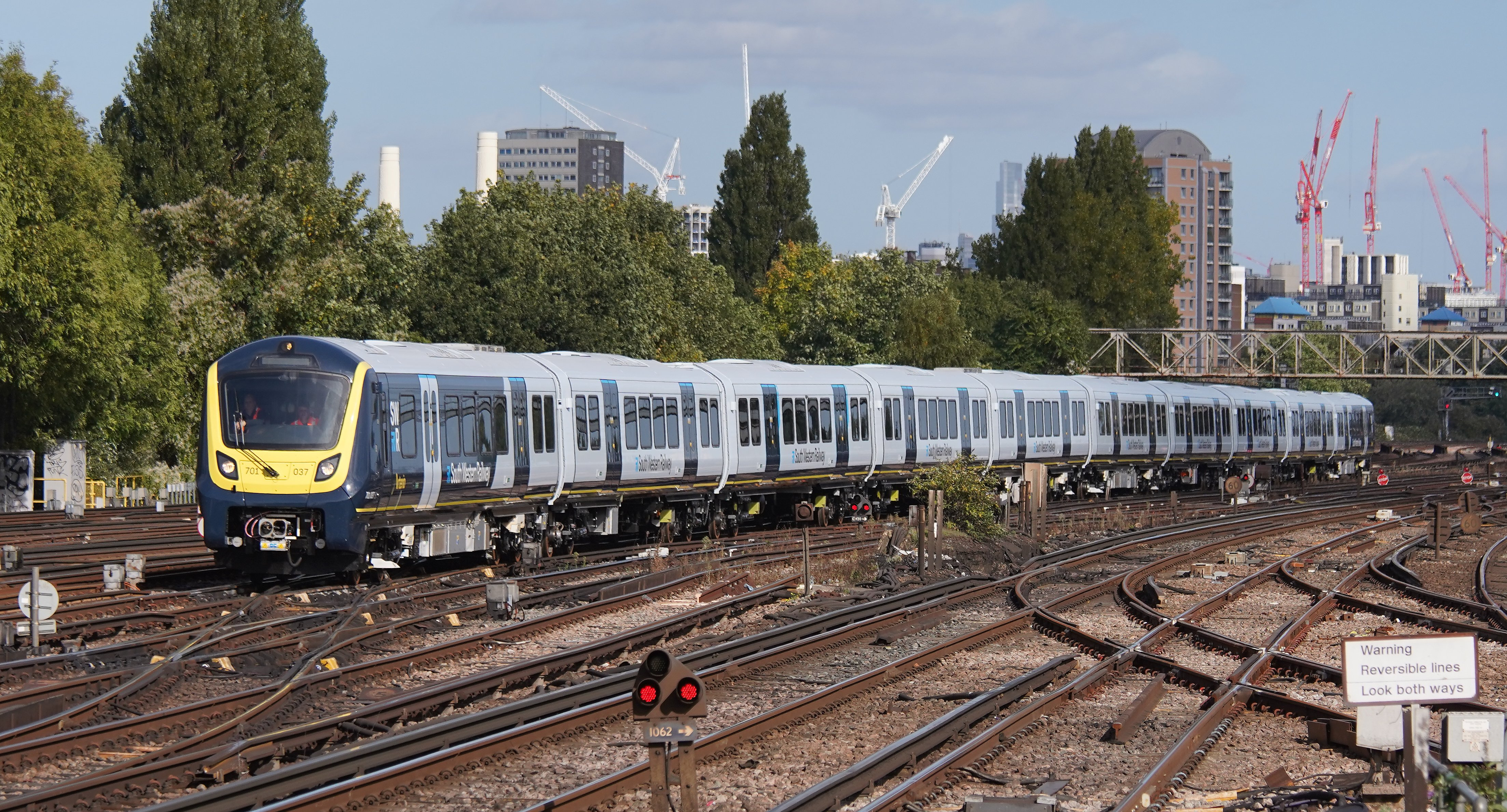
SWR-branded Class 701/0 approaching Clapham Junction

A further update in December 2022 stated that 24 finished units had been accepted, as well as repeating the commitment to introduce the fleet into service "as early in [2023] as possible". A concurrent statement from the Department for Transport indicated that work to finalise a service-standard software package for the trains was still underway and that driver training had not yet commenced.

In May 2023 it was announced that entry into service was planned for December 2023. In June 2023 it was reported that 42 finished units had been accepted and that training for depot drivers had begun, and in July it was confirmed that they were planned to be introduced in 2023. In December 2023 it was reported that 50 finished units had been accepted and that training for mainline driver was being prepared.

In December 2023 the National Union of Rail, Maritime and Transport Workers (RMT) published an update to members advising that they recommended SWR suspend any plans for entry into service or training until "several key areas" are amended to make them suitable for the union and its members. RMT formally rejected the updates to the role of the guard and implementation of driver-only operation on the new rolling stock.

=== Entry into service ===
In late December 2023, it was reported that SWR had reached an agreement with the unions allowing for a "Soft Launch" of the Class 701 fleet. The first unit entered service on 9 January 2024 between London Waterloo and Windsor & Eton Riverside. Since then 2-3 services have run each day using some of the trains, mostly between London Waterloo and Windsor & Eton Riverside. Full entry into service is expected to take 24 months.

In February 2024, it was reported that 71 units had been accepted, and that the entire fleet is planned to be in service in 2025 following the completion of driver training. However, by April 2024 it was further reported that the number of accepted units had dropped to 70, although construction of the fleet of 90 had been completed.

On 30 September 2024, the Class 701 began revenue service on the Shepperton Branch Line. On 28 November 2024, SWR announced that ten additional Class 701 trains will be entering service by June 2025.

In April 2025, it was announced that once the whole fleet was in service, guards would be responsible for closing the doors at stations. The decision was attributed to reported safety concerns around visualising the entire platform clearly under different light conditions. Station modifications are also planned, with SWR saying it is committed to driver-only operation in the future. By December 2025, 30 trains were in service, with Class 455 trains withdrawn at the end of the year. By the end of summer 2026, SWR plans to have 75% of the fleet in service.

== Features ==
The Class 701 features regenerative braking, wide gangways between coaches, wide doors for ease and efficiency of boarding and alighting, 2+2 seating arrangement throughout, Wi-Fi, at-seat USB charging points, real-time passenger information screens, air conditioning, and bicycle spaces (three for each five coaches).

The trains also have Universal Accessible Toilets (UATs) - one toilet in each five coaches, and for the first time in Britain, they are bioreactor Controlled Emission Toilets (CETs), rather than the "conventional" CETs of other British trains. By releasing onboard-treated wastewater, the waste tanks last longer before being emptied.

Each five-car train has 274 seats with room for 361 standing passengers, while a ten-car set will seat 556 passengers with space for 746 standing. The trains also feature external door cameras, and monitors within the cab, to allow for driver-controlled operation (where the driver is responsible for the opening and closing of passenger doors).

== Fleet details ==
The order was initially split into two separate classes, with five-car units placed in Class 705 and ten-car units placed in Class 711, but this was later changed to place ten-car units in Class 701 subclass /0 and five-car units in subclass /5.

Subclass	Operator	Qty.	Year built	Cars per unit	Unit nos.	Formation
701/0	South Western Railway	60	2019–2024	10	701001–701060	DM-(P)M-TLW-M-EM-EM-M-TLW-(P)M-DM
701/5	South Western Railway	30	2019–2024	5	701501–701530	DM-M-TLW-(P)M-DM

=== Illustration ===
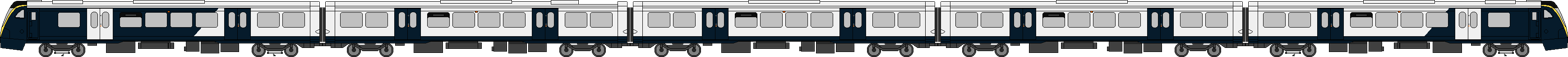
Illustration of South Western Railway Class 701/5 unit

=== Named units ===
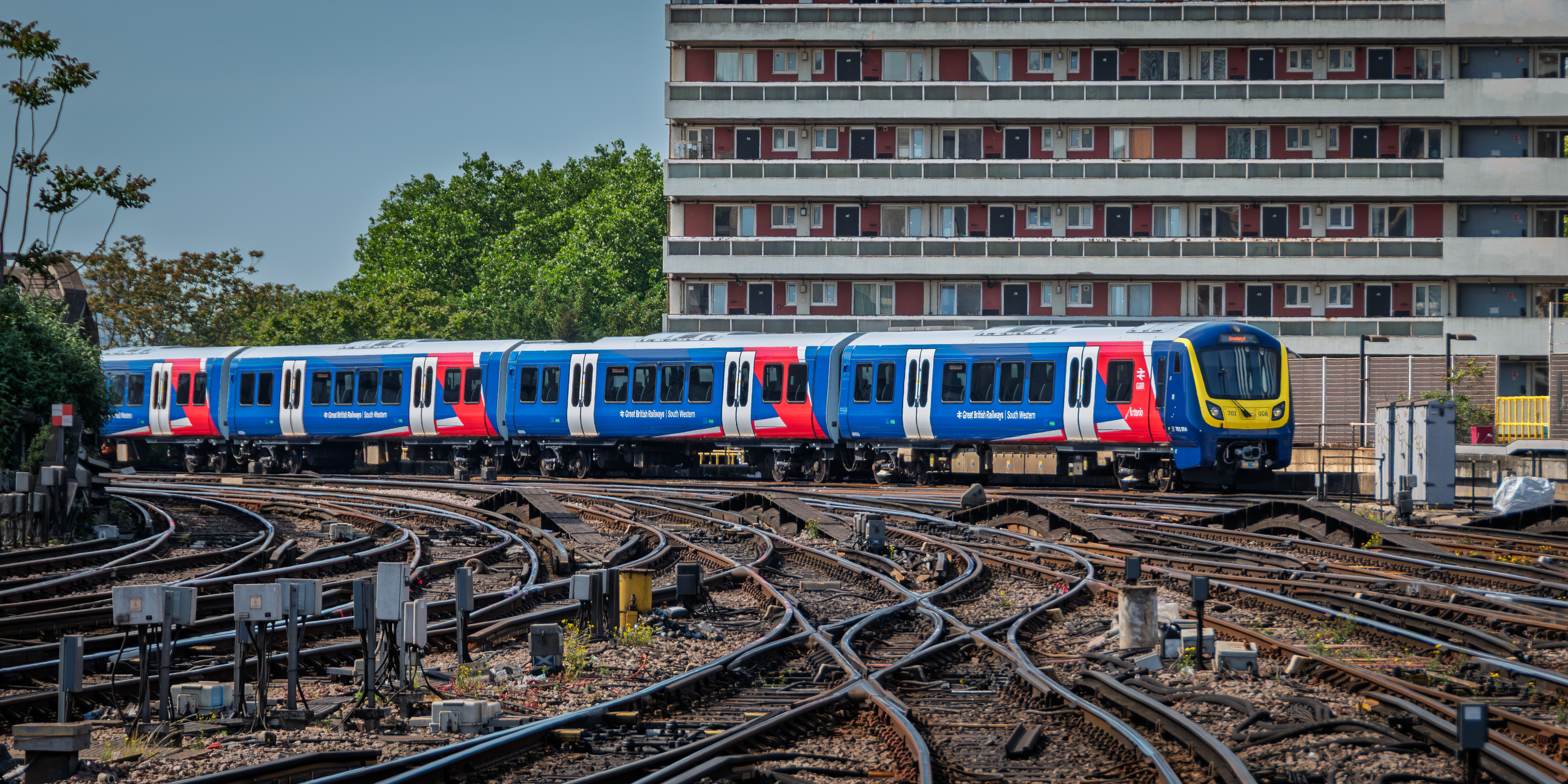
A Class 701 in Great British Railways livery approaching London Waterloo station

The following units have received special liveries or names.

South Western Railway Class 701 units with special names or liveries
Unit number	Name	Notes
Named trains
701021	Phoenix	Named after Aldershot Town F.C. winning the FA Trophy
701031	Nighthawk	Named after English cricketer, Stuart Broad
701035	Jockey	Ascot, Epsom, Sandown Park, Kempton Park racecourses
701036	Red Rose	England rugby union
701039	Ace	Wimbledon tennis championships
701043	Thames Racer	Oxford and Cambridge university boat race
701060	Legoland Locomotive	Legoland Windsor Resort
Special liveries
701006		Great British Railways logos. To mark South Western Railway becoming the first operator to be nationalised
701060	Legoland	To mark Legoland Windsor Resort's 30th anniversary in 2026.
