= Mascolo =

Mascolo is a surname. Notable people with the surname include:

- Anna Chiara Mascolo (born 2001), Italian swimmer
- Anthony Mascolo (born 1957), British hairdresser and creative director of TIGI
- Benjamin Mascolo (born 1993), Italian singer and actor
- Bruno Mascolo (born 1996), Italian basketball player
- Cecilia Mascolo, Italian computer scientist
- Dionys Mascolo (1916−1997), French writer
- Gianni Mascolo (1940–2016), Italian singer
- Joseph Mascolo (1929−2016), American musician and dramatic actor
- Luigi Mascolo (born 1927), Italian priest
- Saverio Mascolo (born 1966), Italian scientist
- Toni Mascolo (1942–2017), British hairdresser and businessman, co-founder of Toni & Guy
