= Effingham, Surrey =

Village and parish in Surrey, England

Coordinates: 51°16′18″N 0°24′01″W

Effingham
- Village
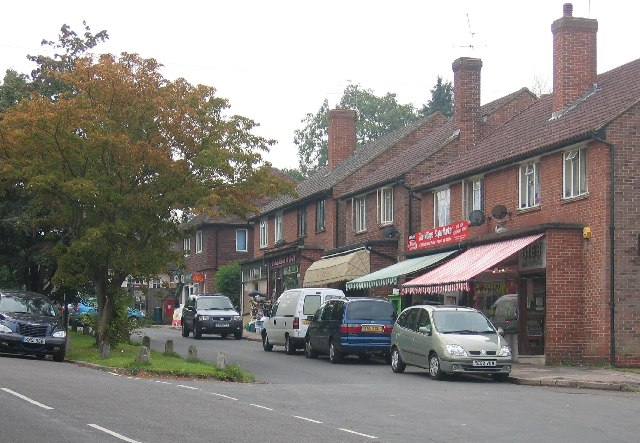
- Village shops on The Street

- Location within Surrey
- Area: 11.98 km^{2} (4.63 sq mi)
- Population: 2,711 (Civil Parish 2011)
  - Density: 226/km^{2} (590/sq mi)
- OS grid reference: TQ1153
- District: Guildford
- Shire county: Surrey
- Region: South East
- Country: England
- Sovereign state: United Kingdom
- Post town: Leatherhead
- Postcode district: KT24
- Dialling code: 01372
- Police: Surrey
- Fire: Surrey
- Ambulance: South East Coast
- UK Parliament: Guildford

Effingham is a village in the Borough of Guildford in Surrey, reaching from the gently sloping northern plain to the crest of the North Downs and with a medieval parish church. The village was the home of notable figures, such as Barnes Wallis, who is buried here and Toni Mascolo. The M25 motorway is 4 miles (6.4 km) north-west of the middle of the village, which consists of new build homes and green space in the Metropolitan Green Belt.

An eponymous Junction railway station is 50 m (160 ft) north of its boundary in East Horsley, where a branch of the Sutton and Mole Valley Lines joins the New Guildford Line, which has services terminating at London Waterloo.

== History ==
=== Late Stone Age ===
Long before Effingham was named by the Saxons, a prehistoric track now called the North Downs Way or Pilgrims' Way was an important prehistoric thoroughfare in Britain. Part of this ancient road forms the southern boundary of Effingham parish. It was used by early traders of flint and stone implements and there is evidence of Stone Age flint mining in the neighbouring village of Horsley.

=== Roman times ===
A Roman coin featuring Emperor Tiberius (r. AD 14–37) and his mother Livia was found in Effingham in 1970 by Dr Sutton in land being prepared as rugby fields in King George V Playing Fields. It is not known whether the coin was dropped on the land by a passing Roman or arrived in chalk from nearby Horsley used as foundations for the rugby pitches.

In 1802 General Oliver de Lancy, Lord of the Manor of Effingham East Court, found a small camp of irregular form near Mare House, Dunley Hill in the south of Effingham parish. It is believed to be of Roman origin but was lost after the land was enclosed under the Effingham East Court Inclosure Act 1802 (42 Geo. 3. c. 76 Pr.) and became arable.

=== Anglo-Saxon period ===
Around c. AD 493, a Saxon noble called Aeffing built his "ham" or house in the area now known as Effingham. A charter of AD 727 granted 20 dwellings in Bookham and Effingham to the Benedictine monastery at Chertsey.

Effingham lay within the Saxon administrative district of Effingham.

Effingham appears in the Domesday Book of 1086 as Epingeham. It was held by Osuuold (Oswald) from Chertsey Abbey and Richard Fitz Gilbert. Its Domesday assets were: 4½ ploughs, 5 acres (2.0 ha) of meadow, herbage and pannage worth 18 hogs. It rendered £8.

=== Medieval period to 18th century ===
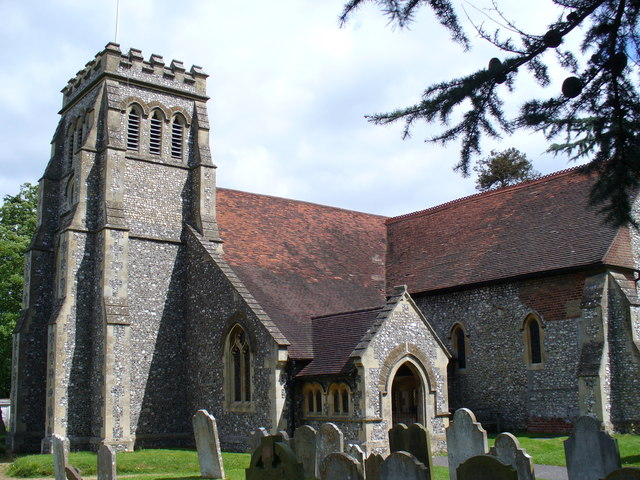
St Lawrence's church is by and large of 1888 but has a chancel of the 14th century and south transept built in 1250.

By the 14th century, the main manor house stood on the site of a Regency mansion which is the clubhouse to Effingham Golf Course, then owned by Sir John Poultney, four times Lord Mayor of the City of London

By 1545, King Henry VIII was hunting on what is now Effingham Golf Course whilst staying at Hampton Court nearby. The manor house and lands were then owned by Lord William Howard (the Lord High Admiral, and later 1st Baron Howard of Effingham) and it was his son the 2nd Baron Howard of Effingham (later 1st Earl of Nottingham) who commanded the English fleet against the Spanish Armada.

The Regency mansion, now the clubhouse, contains a large, intricately carved oak fireplace in the Armada room, dated 1591, which is believed to have been made with timbers from one of Lord Howard of Effingham's ships.

=== 19th century ===
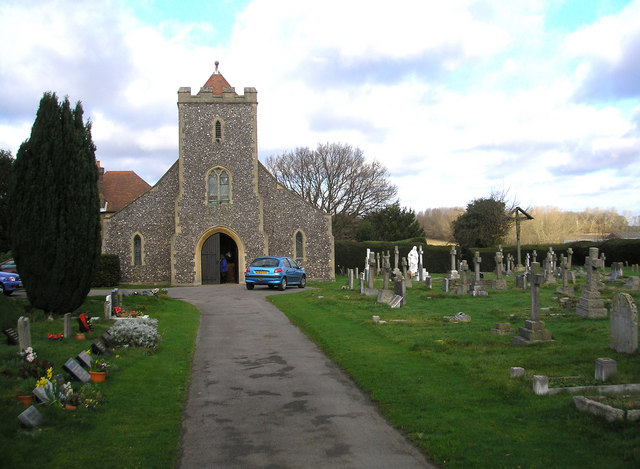
The Roman Catholic church of Our Lady of Sorrows was built in 1913 largely by George Pauling

The house and lands which is now Effingham Golf Club passed through many hands until in 1815 the house and 358 acres (1.45 km^{2}) of land came into the possession of Sir Thomas Hussey Apreece. It was in 1927 when the Surrey Land and Development company negotiated a lease for a group of people wishing to build a golf course. Effingham Manor Golf Club was formed with the artisan golfers using as a clubhouse what are now greenkeepers' cottages near the third tee area. The club has one of the largest man-made lakes in the county which is used to water the golf course during droughts.

The clubhouse, previously the Manor House, is Georgian in style and was reconstructed by David Burnsall in about 1770. Beside the clubhouse is a cedar tree dated to c.1600 which gives rise to the club emblem. The course, designed by Harry S. Colt, is used to hold the qualifying rounds for the Open.

In 1870–72, John Marius Wilson's Imperial Gazetteer of England and Wales described Effingham as:

"a village, a parish, and a hundred in Surrey. The village stands 3¾ miles SW of Leatherhead r. station, and 4¼ NW by W of Dorking; has a post office under Leatherhead; was formerly a place of some importance, said to have contained sixteen churches; and gives the title of Earl to the Howards of Grange. The parish, with the village, is in Dorking district, and comprises 3,148 acres (1,274 ha). Real property, £4,094. Pop., 633. Houses, 122. The property is much subdivided. Effingham Hall is the seat of the Stringers. The living is a vicarage in the diocese of Winchester. Value, £370.* Patron, Andrew Cuthell, Esq. The church is ancient, has stalls, and is good. There is a Wesleyan chapel..."

George Pauling made a name and fortune in connection with the expansion of the railways throughout southern and central Africa under his great friend and confidant, Sir Cecil Rhodes. At the latter's request, Pauling accepted the portfolio of Mines and Public Works for Rhodesia and a member of the Executive Council, holding office from 1894 to 1896. The Lodge and surrounding land, including what is now the KGV playing fields, Pauling bought and spent a "large sum of money in adding to it and spoiling it". In 1912, George Pauling was granted the privilege of a Private Oratory in The Lodge by the then Pope, Pius X. Two dozen local Catholics worshipped there on Sundays and the Chapel became a church the year later. The other church he built in England was to the Sacred Heart at St Ives in 1902.

=== 20th century ===
Sir Barnes Wallis lived most of his adult life here. He is best known as the inventor of the bouncing bomb which breached the Eder and Möhne dams in Germany during the Second World War. He also designed airships including the R100 and applied the geodetic construction methods to aeroplanes.

Wallis lived with his wife Molly in the village for 49 years. Their home south of the village centre in Beech Avenue was called White Hill House but is now renamed Little Court and looks over Effingham Golf Club's 17th fairway. It is believed that early bouncing bomb experiments were carried out in his garden using the family washtub and his children's marbles.

Barnes Wallis joined the governing body of St Lawrence Church, which is a Grade II* listed church in 1932 and served as their secretary for eight years until 1940. In 1946 Barnes Wallis became an Effingham Parish Councillor and served as Chairman of Effingham Parish Council for 10 years. He was also the Chairman of Effingham Housing Association which helped the poor and elderly of the village with housing.

Knighted in 1968, Sir Barnes Wallis was instrumental in the founding days of the KGV playing fields at Effingham. He was Chairman of the KGV Management Committee and negotiated the landscaping of the "bowl" cricket ground. As a fanatical cricket fan, he was keen to see a first-class ground in his village; the County Council wanted to improve the line of the adjacent A246 Guildford road and Wallis persuaded them to cut and fill the sloping playing field to achieve the current superb flat cricket ground. At one stage it was the back-up ground to The Oval. He was the first Chairman of the Effingham Housing Association, a charity which built homes for local people; the most recent development, Barnes Wallis Close, was opened by two members of his family in 2002.

In 1967 on Barnes Wallis' 80th birthday the village presented him with an album about the history of Effingham in recognition of his national and village contributions.

Sir Barnes Wallis died on 30 October 1979 and was buried four days later in St Lawrence Churchyard, a few yards from KGV fields. Two weeks after the funeral, on 17 November, a memorial service was held for him at St. Lawrence Church and on noon that day an Avro Vulcan bomber from 617 Squadron flew overhead as a mark of respect.

On 3 July 1944 a V1 flying bomb fell on Beech Avenue and hit close to a house called Orchard Walls which was damaged.

On 10 July another V1 flying bomb scored a direct hit on a cottage called "Little Thatch". It killed the owner and injured his wife and child. This was the only civilian casualty of World War II in the village. The cottage was rebuilt and renamed Phoenix Cottage which survives to this day on Effingham Common Road.

The Royal Army Service Corps were stationed in Effingham with Canadian soldiers encamped and headquartered in High Barn, Beech Avenue, close to where Barnes Wallis lived.

== Landmarks ==
Among Effingham's architecturally imposing or recognised buildings is an early work by wide-reaching architect Sir Edwin Lutyens, the Red House built in 1893 for Susan Muir-Mackenzie, a mutual friend of Gertrude Jekyll who laid out its garden and orchard. The house later became Corpus Domini Convent and was converted to apartments in 2008.

== Amenities ==
A well-served small village in commerce but less so in public transport, dwarfed by its neighbours Great Bookham and Little Bookham, it is known for its railway station (which is north of the village), large common, generous sports park (called the KGV playing fields), St Teresa's School (private girls' prep school) and the Howard of Effingham School.

A Wealth of the Nation report in 2002 found that Effingham had the second-highest proportion of adults with a savings account in the UK.

About half of housing scales slopes south of the A246 (between Little Bookham and East Horsley) at the top of the small High Street "The Street". The village was founded by the church as a spring line settlement, at the foot of the North Downs. Two parallel roads, The Street and Church Street reflect this by their steep gradient. At the bottom wells exist, whereas towards the top, layers of permeable topsoil underlain with chalk and limestone prevent reaching water.

== Sport ==
As well as the golf club, the village is home to Effingham Cricket Club and Effingham and Leatherhead Rugby Club.

In 2012 Howard of Effingham school became the first school from the south of England to qualify to play at Wembley Stadium in rugby league's Champion Schools tournament.

== Demography and housing ==
2011 Census Homes
Output area	Detached	Semi-detached	Terraced	Flats and apartments	Caravans/temporary/mobile homes	shared between households
(Civil Parish)	676	224	74	74	6	0

The average level of accommodation in the region composed of detached houses was 28%, the average that was apartments was 22.6%.

2011 Census Key Statistics
Output area	Population	Households	% Owned outright	% Owned with a loan	hectares
(Civil Parish)	2,711	1,054	46.6%	37.7%	1,198

The proportion of households in the civil parish who owned their home outright compares to the regional average of 35.1%. The proportion who owned their home with a loan compares to the regional average of 32.5%. The remaining % is made up of rented dwellings (plus a negligible % of households living rent-free).

== In popular culture ==
Effingham featured in the 1971 comedy film She'll Follow You Anywhere.

== Notable people ==
- Julian Bailey (b. 1961), former Formula 1 and Le Mans racing driver and former 'Stig' on Top Gear (TV series)
- Sally James (b. 1950), former actress and Tiswas presenter
- Alice Litman (2002–2022), transgender woman
- Toni Mascolo (1942–2017), co-founder of Toni & Guy
- Admiral Sir Francis Turner (1912–1991), lived at Effingham with his family until his death in 1991.
- Barnes Wallis (resident 1930–1979), inventor of the Bouncing Bomb; buried in St Lawrence Church graveyard

== See also ==
- List of places of worship in Guildford (borough)
