= Effingham Junction Carriage Holding Sidings =

Train stabling point in Effingham, Surrey

Location
- Location: Effingham, Surrey
- Coordinates: 51.2897°N 0.4217°W
- OS grid: TQ100466

Characteristics
- Owner: Network Rail
- Type: Diesel-electric

Effingham Junction Carriage Holding Sidings is located in Effingham, Surrey, on the New Guildford Line and is near Effingham Junction station.

== History ==
In 1983, Class 416, Class 423 and Class 508 EMUs could be seen.

== Present ==
It is a stabling point for Class 73 locomotives.
