= Emma Ross =

English model and actress

- Born: Emma Katherine Ross
- Other name: Em Kathy
- Citizenship: British
- Occupations: Fashion model; actress
- Years active: 2013–present
- Modeling information
- Height: 5 ft 8 in (173 cm)
- Hair color: Auburn/red
- Eye color: Blue
- Website: emmarossmodel.co.uk

Emma Katherine Ross is an English model and actress from Greater Manchester, who was spotted by Richard Weston while employed as a support worker, initially signed to a modelling agency and is currently self represented. She is known for her work at Paris Fashion Week and also her ongoing working relationship with knitwear designer Linda Marveng.

== Career ==
Emma Ross started modelling on a casual basis before going full-time. In October 2016, she was front cover of Professional Jeweller magazine, modelling for Birmingham-based Hockley Mint. Her debut advertising campaign for the Fibre Company in 2017 caught the attention of designer Linda Marveng, who invited her to model knitwear originals. At this time, Emma was engaged by Toni & Guy for hair demos of their label.m salon products, also walking twice for them in Manchester, wearing Henry Holland. In 2018, she was chosen for the cover of 'Mount Mercy' by New York Times bestseller Helena Newbury. She also continued her association with Linda Marveng by shooting campaigns with her in Oslo. In 2019, Ross walked at Paris Fashion Week for Oxford Fashion Studio, modelling Tigers Eye, Babel and Balloon, and Syeda Amera. Also this year, she modelled Revival4Vintage and was front cover of Elisabeth Murphy's Liverpool saga 'To Give And To Take'. In 2020, Ross was selected for front cover of 'The Song of Peterloo' by Carolyn O'Brien, also this year becoming an industry-leader in offering virtual photoshoots from her UK-base to international clients.
