= Effingham Junction railway station =

Railway station in Surrey, England

Coordinates: 51°17′28″N 0°25′12″W

Effingham Junction
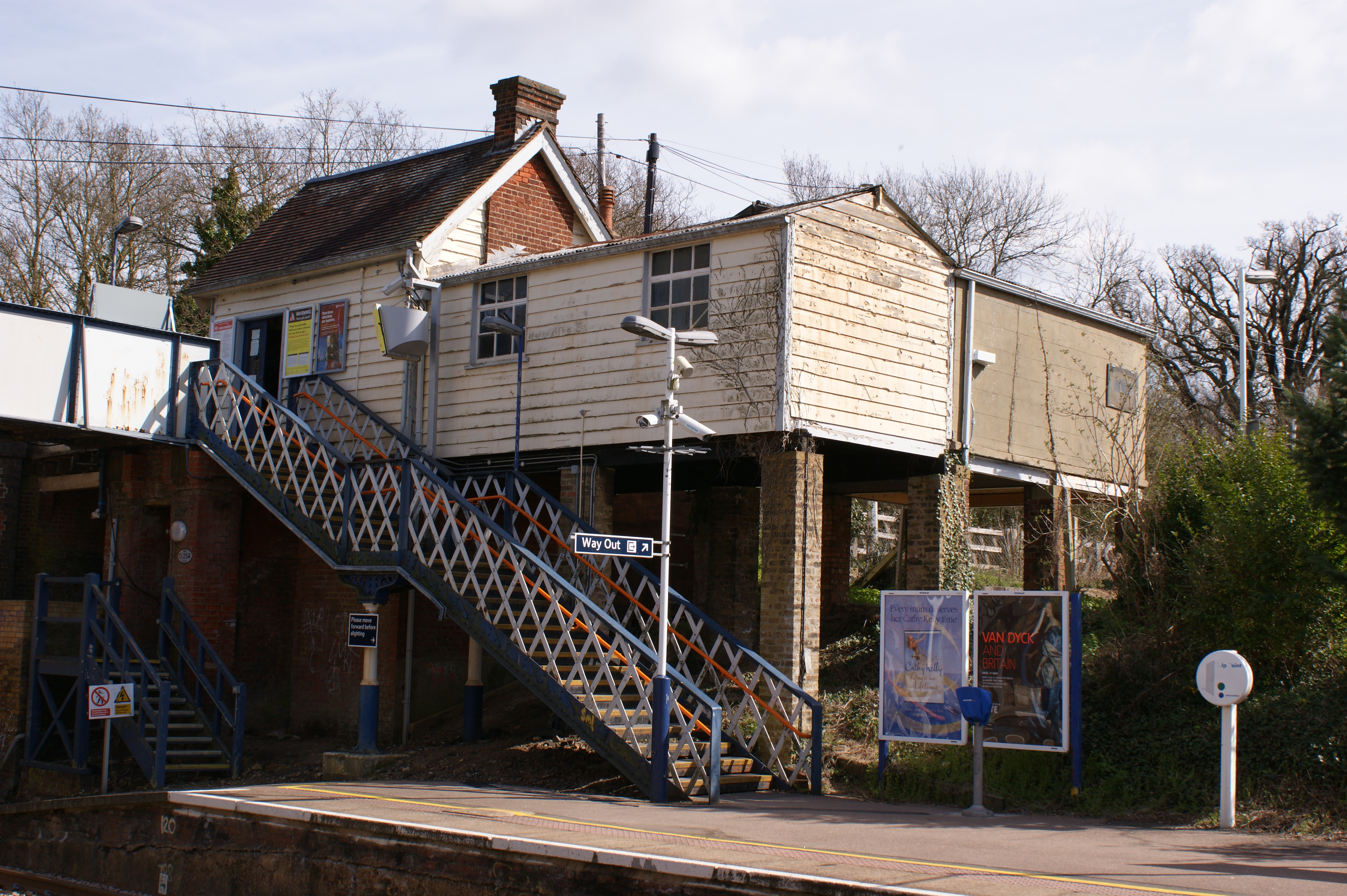

General information
- Location: Effingham, Borough of Guildford; England
- Grid reference: TQ102558
- Managed by: South Western Railway
- Platforms: 2

Other information
- Station code: EFF
- Classification: DfT category D

History
- Opened: 1888

Passengers
- 2020/21: ▼47,852
- Interchange: ▼2,232
- 2021/22: ▲0.150 million
- Interchange: ▲6,366
- 2022/23: ▲0.185 million
- Interchange: ▲10,515
- 2023/24: ▲0.211 million
- Interchange: ▲12,918
- 2024/25: ▲0.243 million
- Interchange: ▲13,969
Location
Notes
- Passenger statistics from the Office of Rail and Road

Effingham Junction railway station is just north of the far northern border of the village of Effingham, closer to the centre of East Horsley, homes of which it borders, in Surrey, England. Although the station takes its name from the former settlement, and the immediate vicinity has itself become known as Effingham Junction, it is actually in the latter. Effingham Junction is at the junction of the New Guildford Line, from London Waterloo to Guildford, and the line from Leatherhead, which carries trains from Waterloo via Epsom. It is 21 miles 10 chains (34.0 km) down the line from Waterloo.

== History ==
The London and South Western Railway opened the station on 2 July 1888, three years after completing the two routes that serve it. Both routes were subsequently electrified by the Southern Railway in 1925 and for many years it served as the terminus for trains from the Epsom direction, with a seven-road carriage shed south of the station provided by the SR to allow empty EMU sets to be reversed and stabled clear of the main running lines. This still stands, though it ceased to be used for carriage storage in 1993 – it is now used by Colas Rail as a maintenance base for Network Rail MPVs and track machines.

The station is managed and primarily serviced by South Western Railway, though Southern also provided some peak period services. The latter are a holdover from the British Rail-era timetables of the 1970s and 1980s, when the Epsom line had regular services to London Victoria as well as to Waterloo. It was also served in the late 1980s/early 1990s by Thameslink services between Luton and Guildford via Herne Hill and West Croydon, but these ended in 1994 shortly before the privatisation of the UK railway network. The station features in the 1956 British Transport Films "A Day of One's Own".

== Facilities ==
The station has a ticket office which is open during weekday and Saturday mornings only. At other times, there are self-service ticket machines available for ticket purchases. There are also toilets at the station which are open when the station is staffed. Both platforms have covered seating areas, information screens and help points.

There is a chargeable car park and large bicycle storage facility located at the station. Step-free access is available to the Guildford bound platform only.

== Services ==
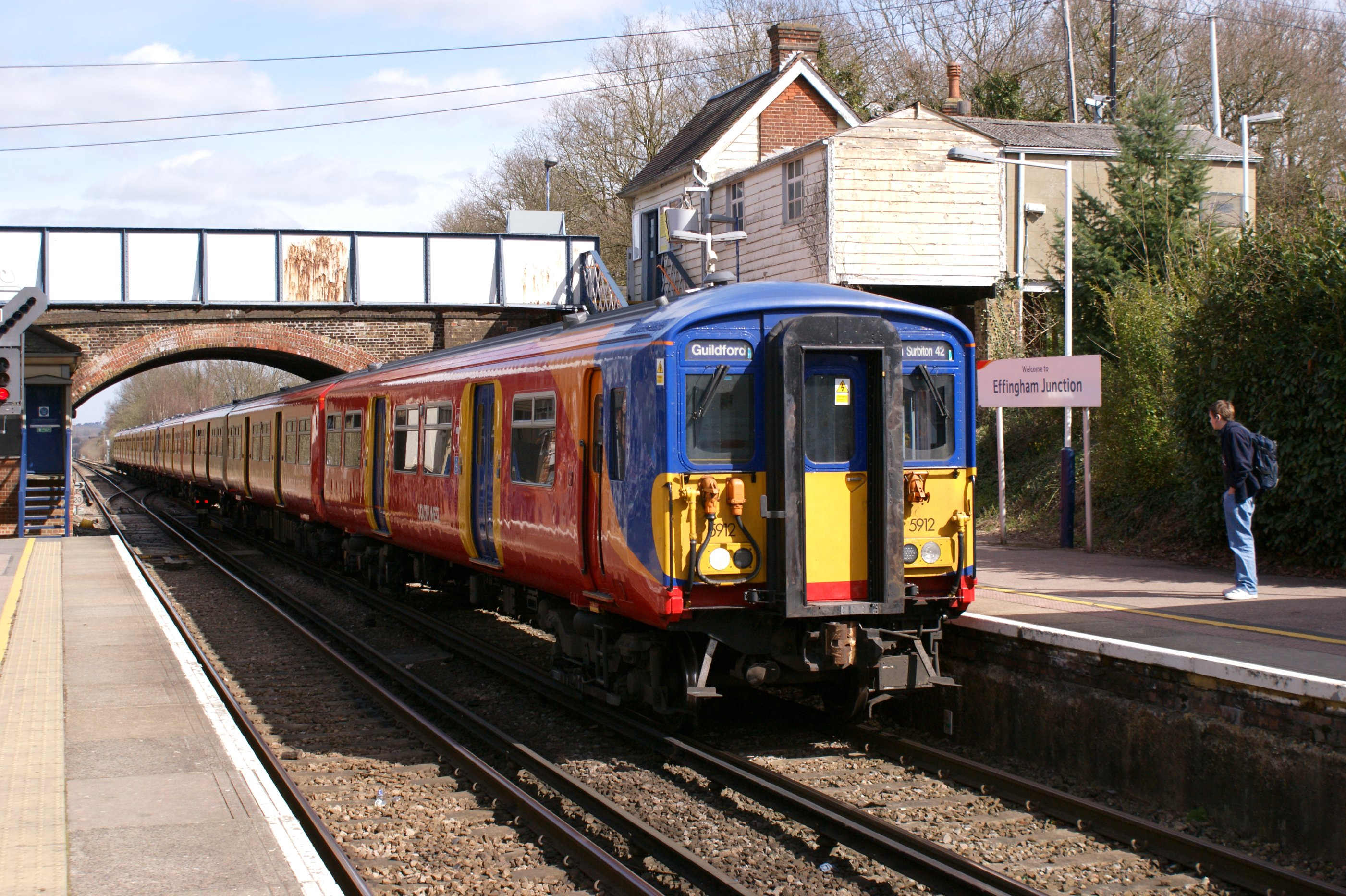
Class 455 calls at the station

All services at Effingham Junction are operated by South Western Railway using Class 450 and Class 701 EMUs.

The typical off-peak service in trains per hour is:

- 3 tph to London Waterloo (2 of these run via Cobham and 1 runs via Epsom)
- 3 tph to Guildford

Additional services run via Epsom during the peak hours, increasing the service to 4 tph in each direction.

Preceding station	National Rail	Following station
Cobham & Stoke d'Abernon	South Western Railway New Guildford Line	Horsley
Bookham	South Western Railway Mole Valley Line	Horsley
	Disused railways	
Guildford	Network SouthEast Thameslink	Leatherhead

== See also ==
- Effingham Junction Traincare depot
- Effingham Junction Carriage Holding Sidings

== Literature ==
- Body, G. (1984), PSL Field Guides - Railways of the Southern Region, Patrick Stephens Ltd, Cambridge, ISBN 0-85059-664-5
