= Anthony Mascolo =

English hairdresser

- Born: 27 April 1957 (age 69); London, England
- Occupations: Editor-in-chief, INFRINGE; Creative director of TIGI
- Known for: 3-time winner of "British Hairdresser of the Year"
- Spouse: Pat Mascolo
- Children: 3
- Parent(s): Francesco and Maria Mascolo
- Relatives: Toni Mascolo (brother)
- Website: http://www.infringe.com http://www.tigiprofessional.com

Anthony Mascolo (born 27 April 1957) is a hairdresser and international creative director of TIGI, a hair care product business. He has won the title "British Hairdresser of the Year" three times.

== Early years ==
Mascolo was born in London, the son of Italian immigrants, Francesco and Maria Mascolo, the youngest of five brothers, four of whom were to become hairdressers. By the time he left school he was a competent and fully qualified hairdresser. His first job was in the family's Toni & Guy salon in South London, where his father and brother Bruno also worked. Anthony specialised in hairdressing for photographic shoots, and became a photographer himself.

== TIGI ==
In 2002 when TIGI demerged from its parent company Toni & Guy, Anthony became international creative director. With his wife Pat he opened Bed Head Photographic Studios, in Battersea, London, and founded the TIGI international creative team, and was joined by Nick Irwin and Akos Bodi, as European creative director and European education director respectively. Within three years they opened the TIGI Creative Academy in London.

In April 2009 TIGI's global operation was acquired by Unilever. Mascolo has been retained as a creative consultant.

== Personal life ==
Anthony married his wife Pat in 1986. They have 3 children: Georgina, Alexandra, and Joshua. His favourite pastime is skiing.
