= British Rail Class 444 =

British electric passenger train

British Rail Class 444 Desiro
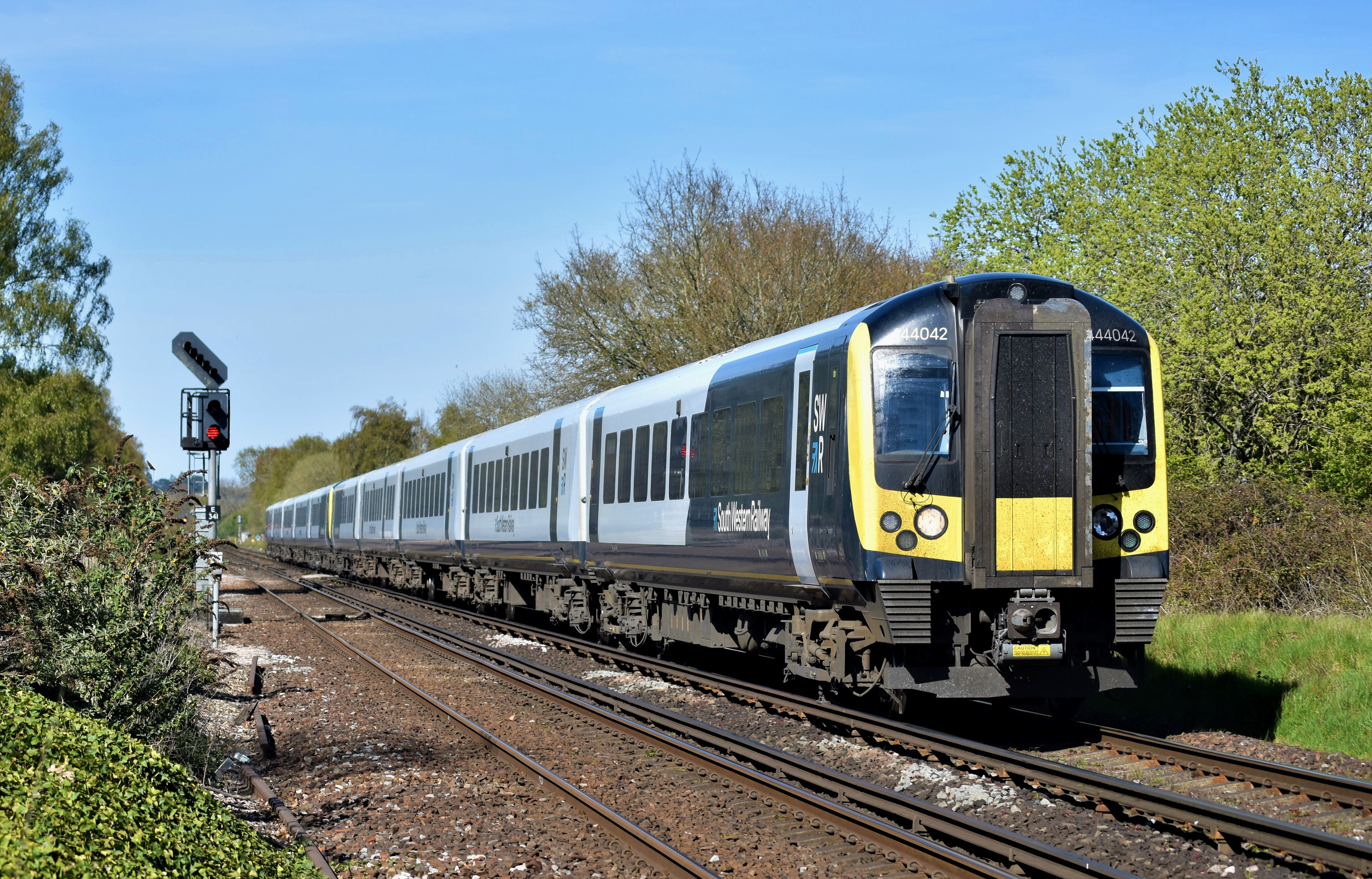
- A pair of South Western Railway Class 444s near Southampton Airport Parkway in 2021

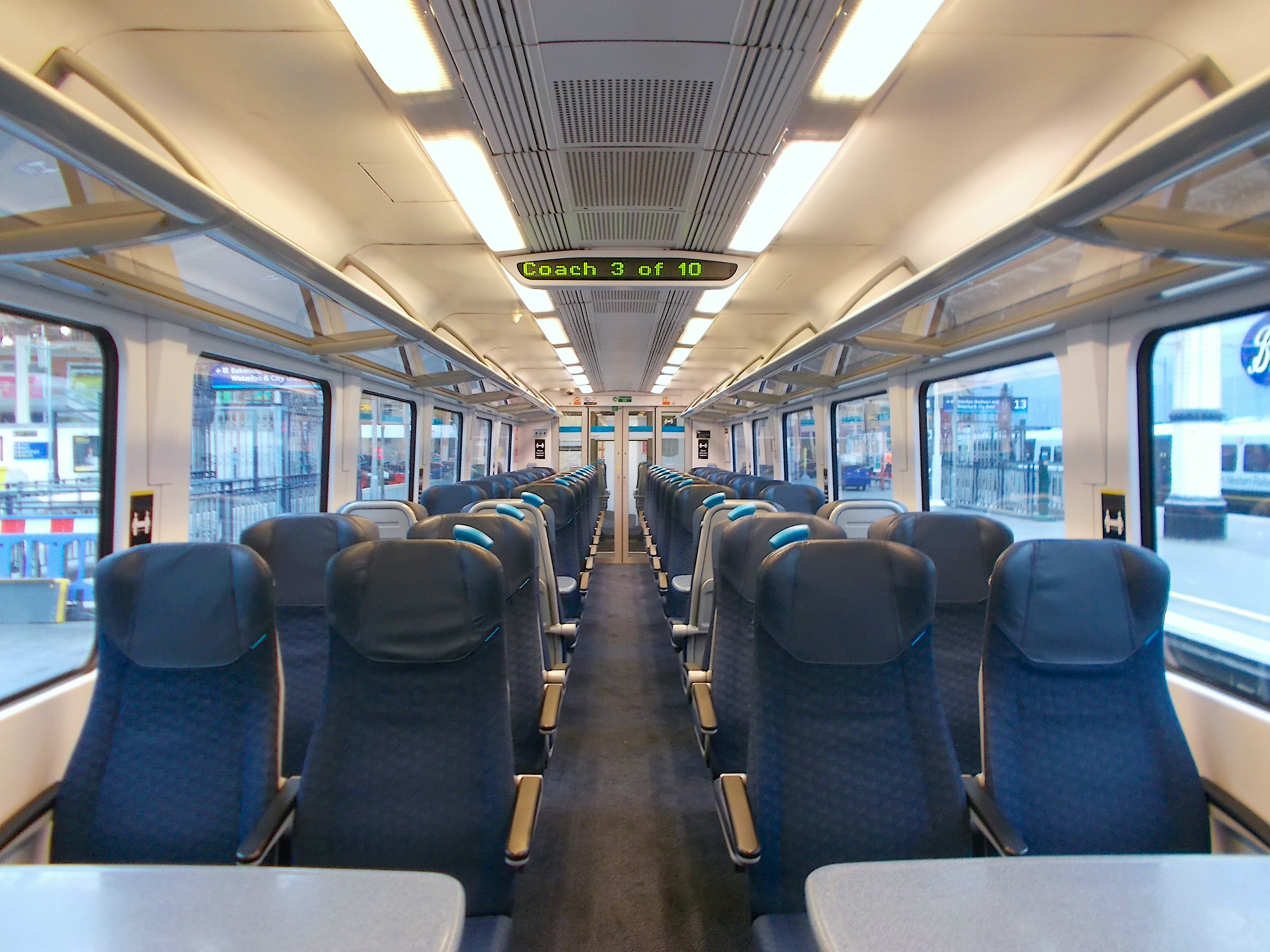
- Refurbished standard-class saloon
- In service: 21 April 2004 – present
- Manufacturer: Siemens Transportation Systems
- Assembly: Siemens SGP Verkehrstechnik
- Built at: Vienna, Austria
- Family name: Desiro
- Replaced: Class 411; Class 412; Class 421; Class 423; Class 442
- Constructed: 2002–2004
- Refurbished: 2017–2020
- Number built: 45
- Formation: 5 cars per unit: DMOS-TOSL-TOSL-(P)TOSLW-DMOC
- Fleet numbers: 444001–444045
- Capacity: As built: 334 seats (35 first-class, 299 standard); As refurbished: 359 seats (32 first-class, 327 standard)
- Owner: Angel Trains
- Operator: South Western Railway
- Depot: Northam

Specifications
- Car body construction: Aluminium
- Train length: approx. 119 m (390 ft 5 in)
- Car length: 23.57 m (77 ft 4 in)
- Width: 2.796 m (9 ft 2.1 in)
- Floor height: 1.157 m (3 ft 9.6 in)
- Doors: Single leaf Sliding plug
- Wheel diameter: 850–786 mm (33.46–30.94 in) (new–worn)
- Wheelbase: Bogies: 2.600 m (8 ft 6.4 in)
- Maximum speed: 100 mph (160 km/h)
- Weight: Total: 227 tonnes (223 long tons; 250 short tons)
- Traction system: Siemens SIBAS IGBT
- Traction motors: 8 × Siemens 1TB2016-0GB02 asynchronous three-phase AC
- Power output: 1,500 kW (2,000 hp) (at wheel)
- Tractive effort: Starting: 200 kN (45,000 lb_{f})
- Acceleration: approx. 1 m/s^{2} (3.3 ft/s^{2})
- Electric systems: 750 V DC third rail
- Current collection: Contact shoe
- UIC classification: Bo′Bo′+2′2′+2′2′+2′2′+Bo′Bo′
- Bogies: Siemens SGP SF5000
- Minimum turning radius: 120 m (393 ft 8 in)
- Braking systems: Electro-pneumatic (disc) and regenerative
- Safety systems: AWS; TPWS
- Coupling system: Dellner 12
- Multiple working: Within class, and with Class 450
- Track gauge: 1,435 mm (4 ft 8 1/2 in) standard gauge

The British Rail Class 444 Desiro is a third-rail electric multiple-unit passenger train built by Siemens Transportation Systems in Austria between 2002 and 2004. The Class 444 currently operate on express passenger services for South Western Railway.

The class first entered service with South West Trains in 2004.

== Description ==
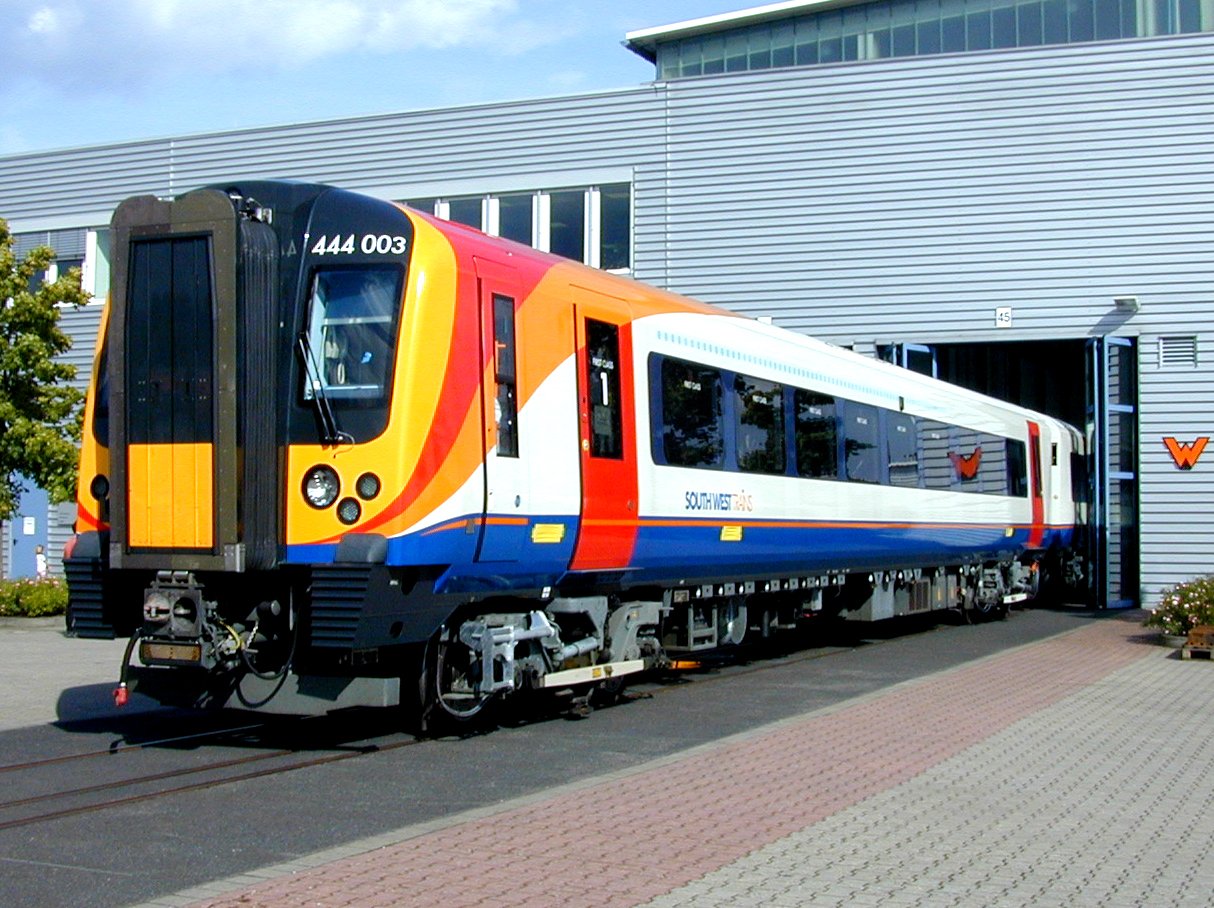
Class 444 unit at the Siemens Wildenrath test centre in 2004.

At the start of the 21st century, as part of its franchise agreement, South West Trains was required to replace the slam-door rolling stock of Classes 411, 412, 421 and 423, which were over 40 years old and did not meet modern health and safety standards, with new trains by 2005. In April 2001 an order was placed with Siemens for 785 vehicles. This was originally to be split as 100 four-car Class 450/0 outer-suburban units, 32 five-car Class 450/2 inner-suburban units, and 45 five-car Class 444 express units.

The Class 444 fleet was built at Siemens' Vienna plant. Before being shipped to Britain via the Channel Tunnel, the trains were extensively tested at Siemens' Wegberg-Wildenrath Test and Validation Centre in Germany. This was an attempt to reduce the time taken for new trains to enter service, by ironing out any problems beforehand. Many other designs of new train, such as the Alstom-built Class 458 units, had been plagued by problems and poor reliability. The Desiro fleet entered service faster than its competitors, but still suffered teething problems.

Each unit is formed of five cars; a driving motor car at each end and three intermediate trailers. One trailer in each unit is provided with two wheelchair spaces and a universally-accessible toilet. The units have end-gangways, allowing passengers to move between units when used in multiple. Trains are limited to a ten-car length (i.e. two units), as longer trains cannot be accommodated in stations. At some stations with particularly short platforms (for example Shawford, in Hampshire), even a single unit of five cars is too long for the platform. Passengers used to have to board and alight via a single door opened by the guard, however, since the introduction of automatic selective door operation (ASDO) in early 2015, the computer system works out how many cars to release the doors on. Each five-car unit has a first-class section taking up just over half of one car at one end. All seats have BS 1363 230 V mains sockets providing AC power for laptops or mobile phone chargers.

The fleet was originally painted in a mixture of SWT's express livery of white, with a blue window band, and red/orange swishes at the cab ends. In the late 2010s, trains were repainted in the South Western Railway livery following the change of franchise. This is predominantly light grey with darker grey sections towards the cabs, and doors painted in the opposing shade of grey to the bodywork in that area.

Like all new-build third-rail rolling stock in the UK, one car in each unit is fitted with a recess for a pantograph that allows for a future conversion to AC overhead power. In March 2012, the Class 444, 450 and 458 fleets were fitted with regenerative braking. A new variable-stiffness hydraulic bush has been fitted to the whole Class 444 fleet so as to reduce track damage and thus infrastructure maintenance costs. This work was completed by the end of 2013.

Both the Class 444 and 450 fleets are maintained at the purpose-built Northam Traincare Facility in Southampton, which is equipped to perform both preventative and corrective maintenance, deep-cleaning, and overhauls on up to eight units simultaneously.

== Operations ==
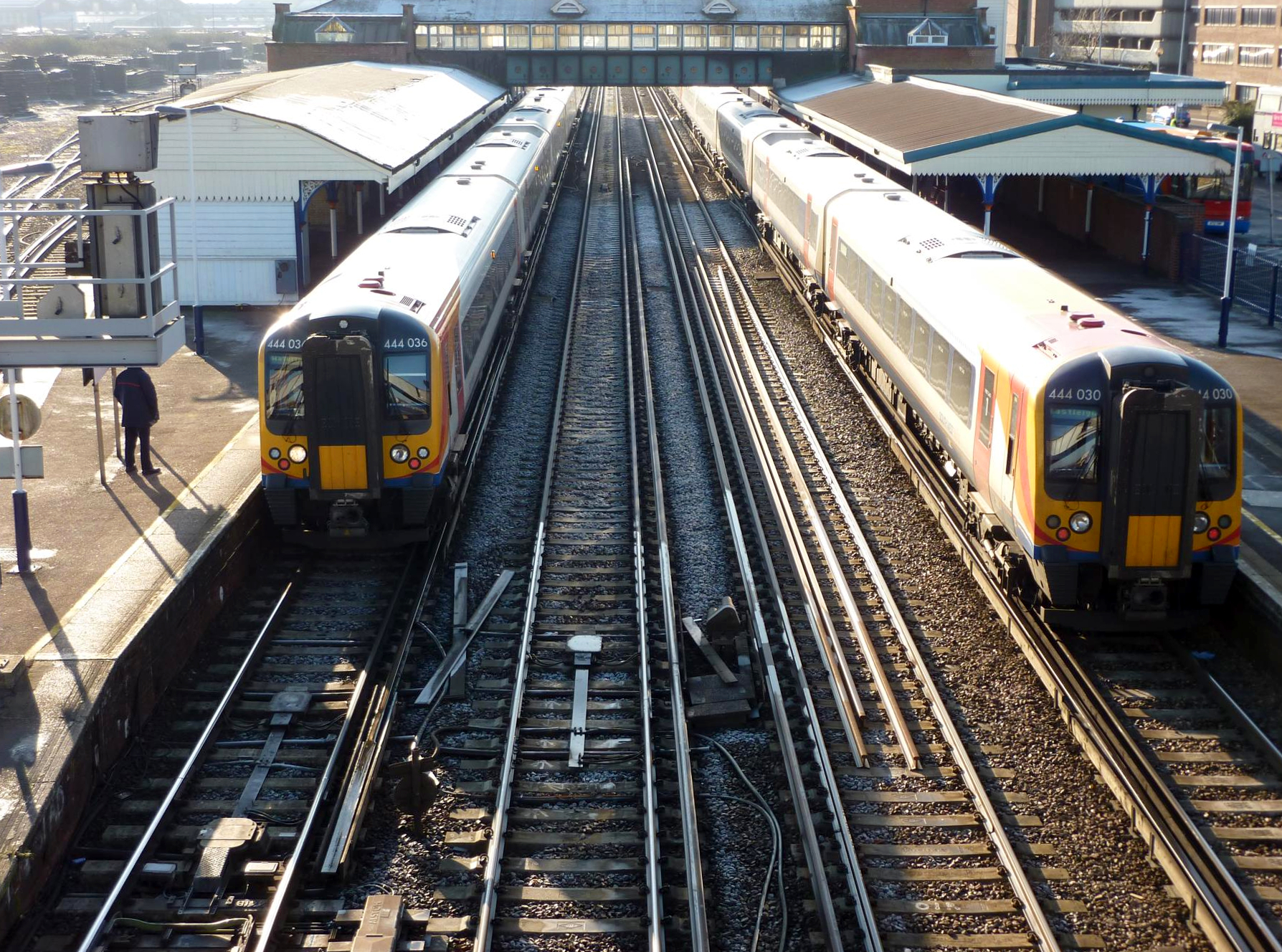
Two Class 444s of South West Trains at Eastleigh in 2010

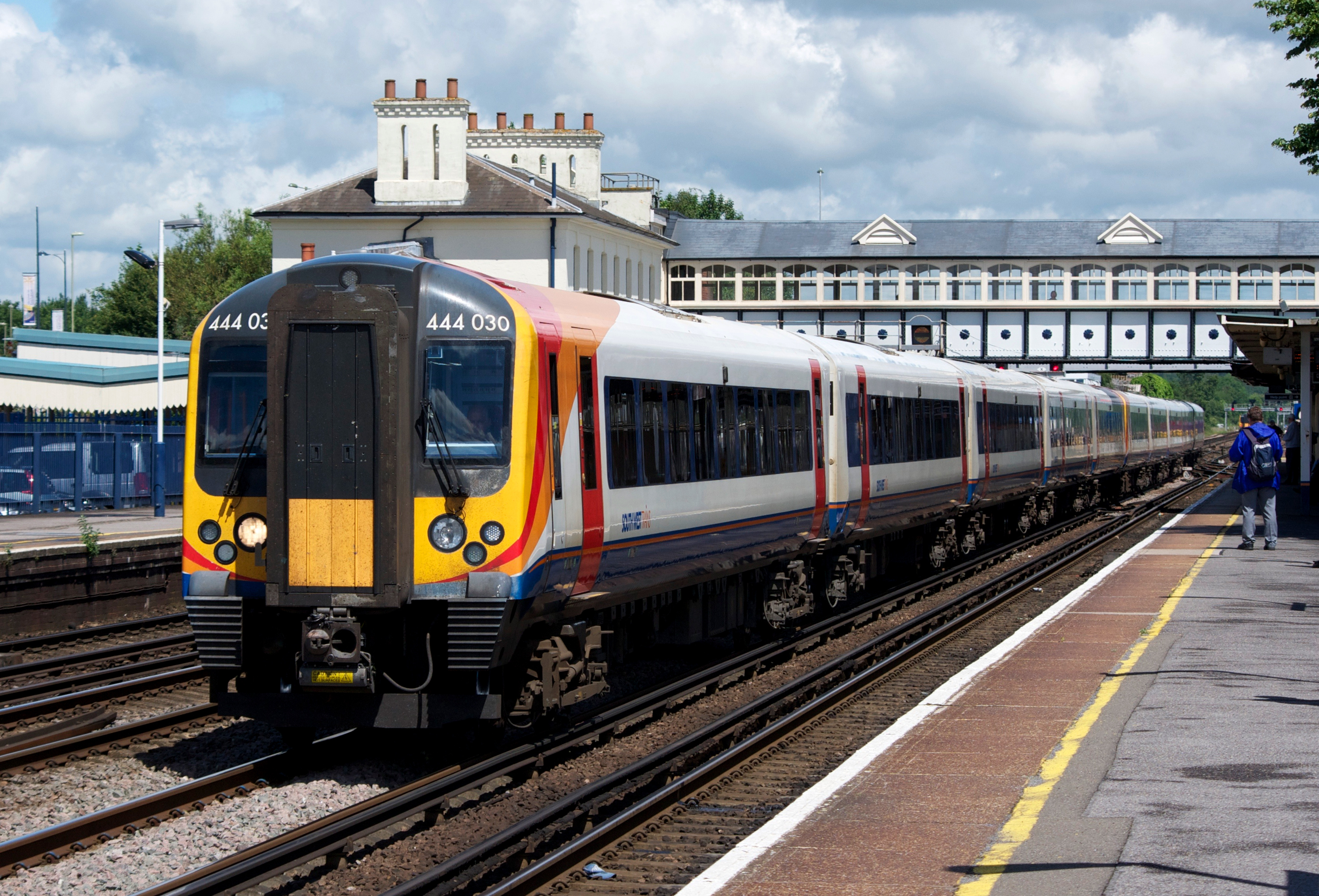
A pair of South West Trains Class 444s pass through Eastleigh on a midday service to Weymouth in 2014

The first Class 444 units entered service with SWT (South West Trains) in early 2004. As part of the launch, unit no. 444018 was named The Fab 444 at a ceremony at London Waterloo.

The units were introduced on services from London Waterloo to Portsmouth Harbour via the Portsmouth Direct Line. They were also used on some services on the South West Main Line to Southampton Central, Bournemouth, Weymouth and on limited outer suburban services to Alton and Basingstoke. This allowed the withdrawal of the final 411 units by mid-2004, and inroads were made to the 421 and 423 fleets.

It was originally hoped that the final slam-door trains would be withdrawn by the end of 2004. In the event, some were allowed to remain operational until May 2005, as the last replacement Desiros came into service. Initially, the Class 444s were used mainly on Portsmouth direct services, allowing the Class 442 units to be used on the Weymouth line. The Class 444 units were also used regularly on Sunday-only Bournemouth stopping services, Waterloo to Southampton services and the Brockenhurst to Wareham shuttle service. Previous power limitations meant that the trains were not permitted to run west of Poole; these restrictions have since been lifted.

During 2007, the Class 444 units replaced the Class 442 on the Weymouth line. Some Class 442 workings were taken over by Class 444 units as early as November 2006; the final Class 442 was withdrawn in February 2007. Class 444 units transferred to the Weymouth line were replaced on Portsmouth services by Class 450 Desiros which became available after the reintroduction of the Class 458 units on the Waterloo to Reading line. The decision to transfer many Class 444 units to the Weymouth line was not popular. Portsmouth line passengers protested over the use of Class 450 on some services, while there were complaints that the Class 444 were inferior to the units they replaced on the Weymouth line.

Class 444s are currently used on the following services:

- Waterloo to Basingstoke (peak services)
- Waterloo to Portsmouth Harbour via Guildford (shared with Class 450)
- Waterloo to Portsmouth Harbour via Basingstoke and Fareham (shared with Class 450)
- Waterloo to Weymouth / Poole

En route, usually taking place at Bournemouth, two units operating in a pair divide into two individual services, with the front half of the former 10-car train operating to Weymouth, and the rear half of the service operates to Poole. The inverse happens on the return to London, where both units join back together, to operate semi-fast via Brockenhurst, Southampton, Winchester, Basingstoke, Woking, and Clapham.

In 2010, the Class 444 was awarded the "Golden Spanner 2010" as Britain's most reliable trains by Modern Railways. During a twelve month period, SWT's fleet set a new reliability record of almost 89,000 kilometres per technical delay.

=== Mid-life Refurbishment ===
South Western Railway conducted a refurbishment programme under its contract from 2017 to 2020. All 45 units were deep-cleaned, and each seat cover in both standard and first class were replaced. Each pair of seats were given a plug socket, and the guard office and onboard shop were been removed to provide extra seats. First class was reduced from a full carriage of 35 seats to 3/4 of a carriage housing 32 seats, and the 2+1 seating was replaced with 2+2 seating. Leather seats and new tables provide facilities for wireless charging on board.

== Fleet details ==
Class	Operator	Qty.	Year built	Cars per unit	Unit nos.
444	South Western Railway	45	2002–2004	5	444001–444045

=== Interiors ===
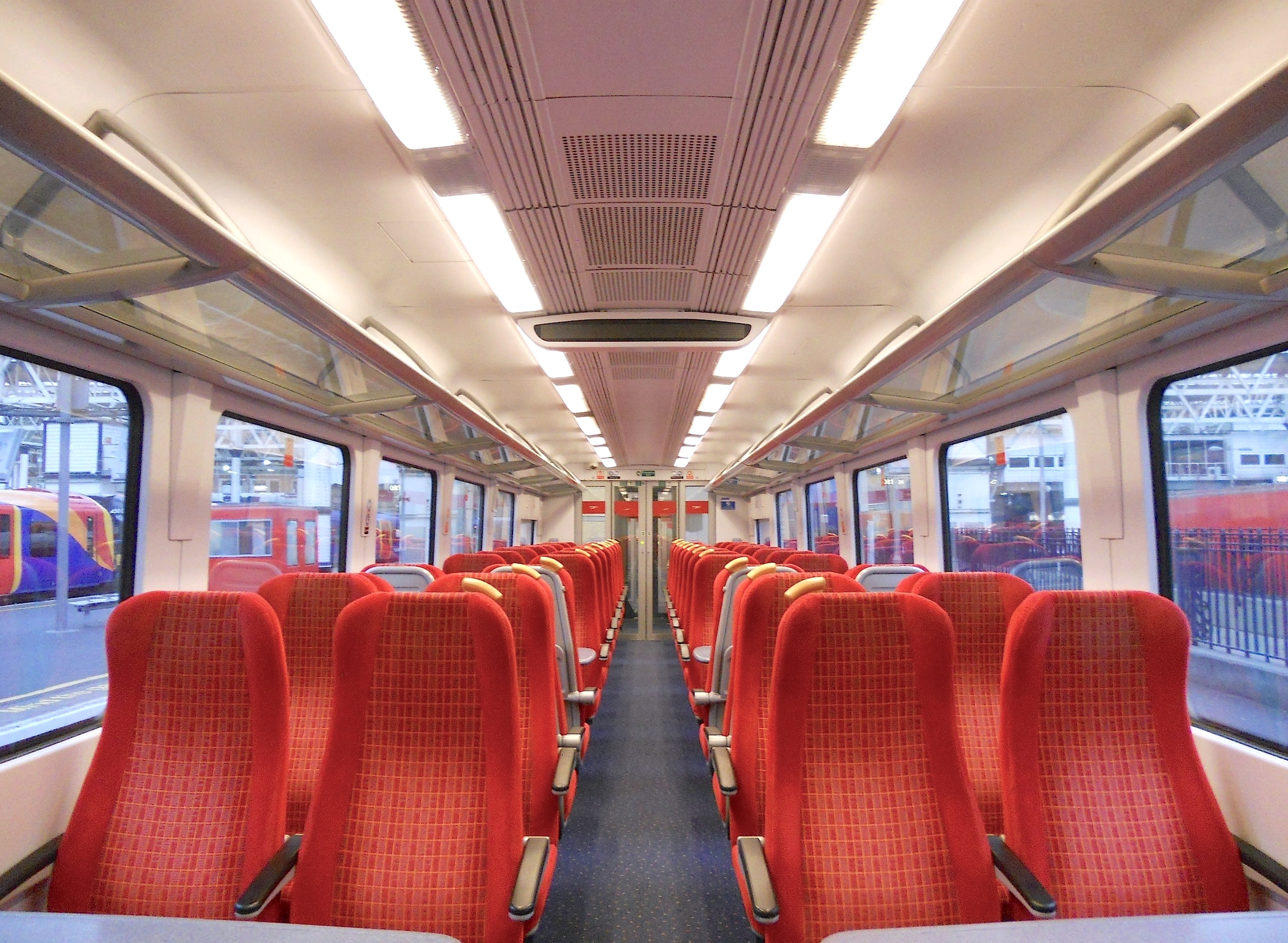
Original standard-class interior in 2012

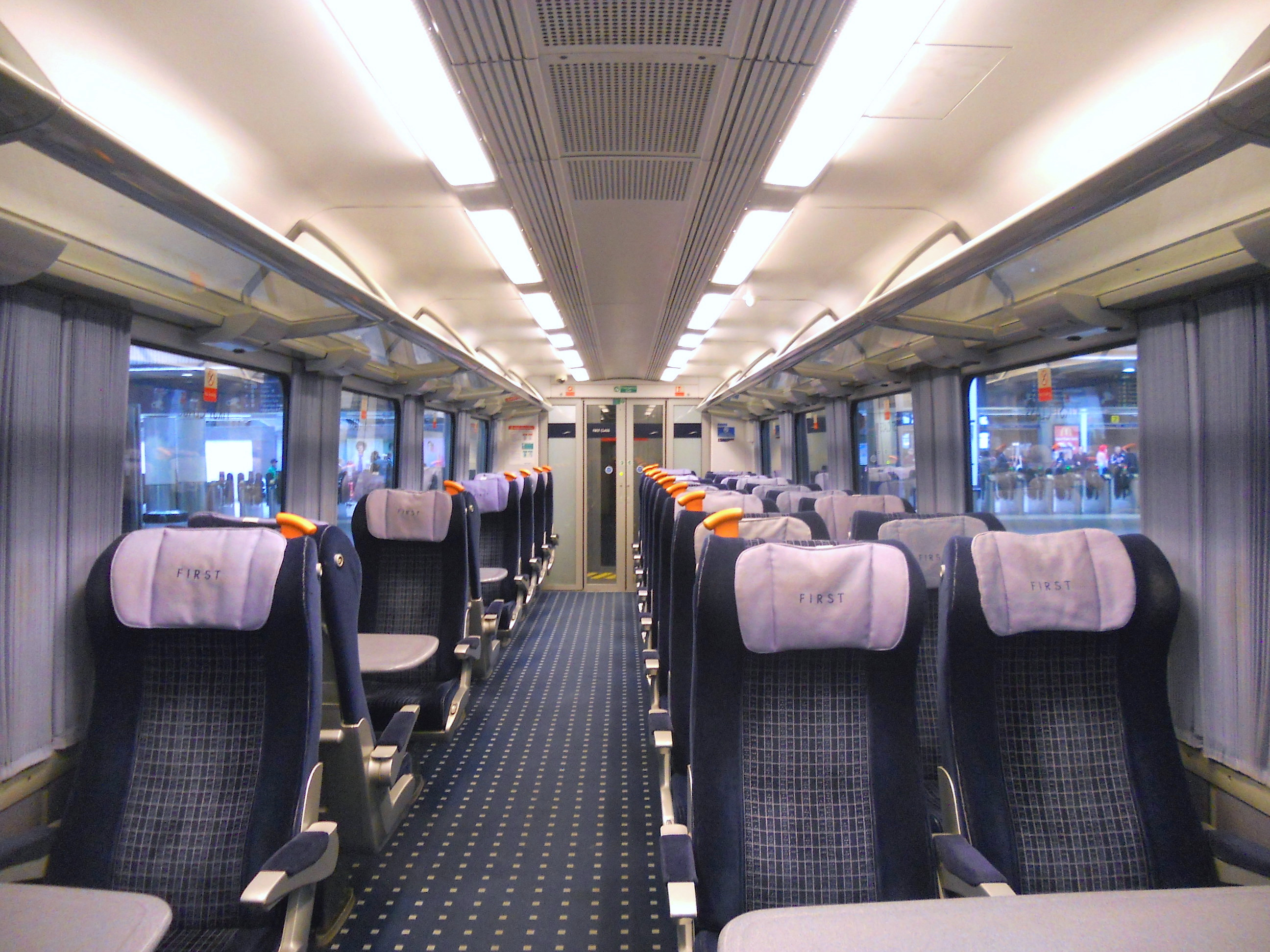
Original first-class interior in 2015

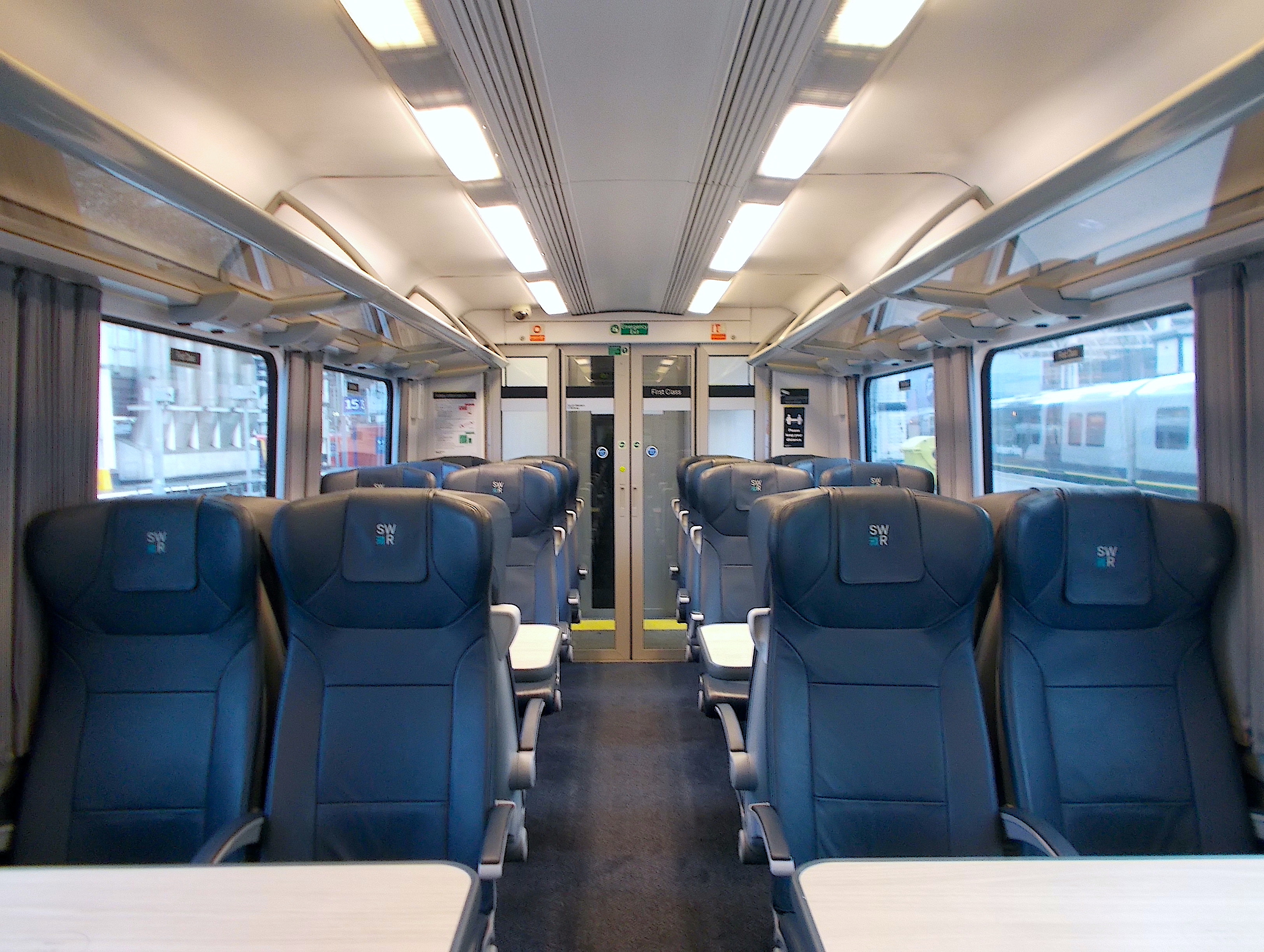
Refurbished first-class interior in 2021

=== Illustration ===
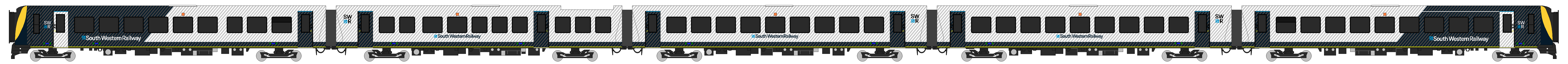
Illustration of a Class 444 unit in South Western Railway livery, used from 2017 onwards

=== Named units ===
The following units have received names:

- 444001: Naomi House (de-named)
- 444012: Destination Weymouth
- 444018: FAB444
- 444023: The Alex Wardle Foundation
- 444040: The D-Day Story Portsmouth 80 Anniversary

=== Special Liveries ===
In 2019, 444019 was painted in a Pride livery to celebrate diversity in the company and its customers.
