= Plastic Pig =

Plastic Pig may refer to:

- British Rail Class 442
- Reliant Robin#In popular culture
