= Effingham Junction Traincare depot =

Coordinates: 51.291°N 0.42°W

Effingham Junction Traincare depot stables Class 455 electric multiple units operated by South Western Railway. It is mainly a train shed, but it is classed as a depot. Freight trains are also stabled here occasionally.

== Location ==
The depot is right by Effingham Junction railway station.
