= Northam Traincare Facility =

Traction maintenance depot in Southampton, England

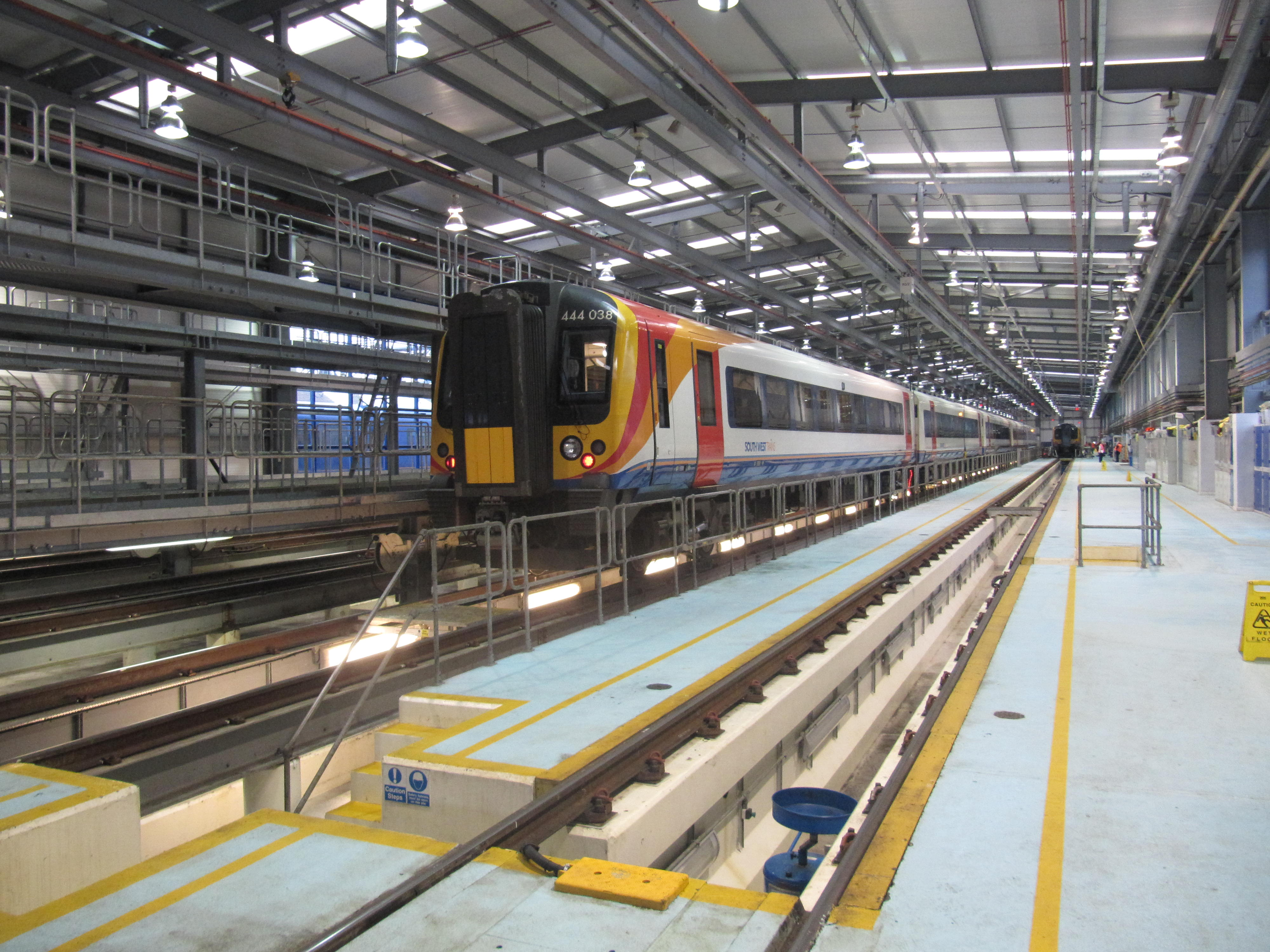
- A South West Trains Class 444 inside the facility in 2010
- Interactive map of Northam Traincare Facility

Location
- Location: Northam, Southampton, Hampshire, England
- Coordinates: 50°54′43″N 1°23′29″W
- OS grid: SU428127

Characteristics
- Owner: Siemens Mobility
- Depot code: NT
- Type: EMU

History
- Opened: 2002

Northam Traincare Facility, also known as Northam Carriage Servicing Depot, is an electric traction maintenance depot in the suburb of Northam in Southampton, England. The depot is situated on the South West Main Line and is south of St Denys station at Northam Junction. Two tracks on the formation of the branch to the Eastern Docks are used as the depot headshunt and extra berthing sidings. It is the principal maintenance facility for the Class 444 and 450s operated by South Western Railway.

== History ==
The depot was opened in 2003 and was the first of Siemens' purpose-built depots in the UK.

== Facilities ==
The depot consists of three main buildings; the core maintenance facility, a wheel lathe and a train wash.

== Present ==
As of 2019, stabling is provided for South Western Railway Class 444s and Class 450 Desiros.
