= British Rail Class 450 =

British electric passenger train

British Rail Class 450 Desiro
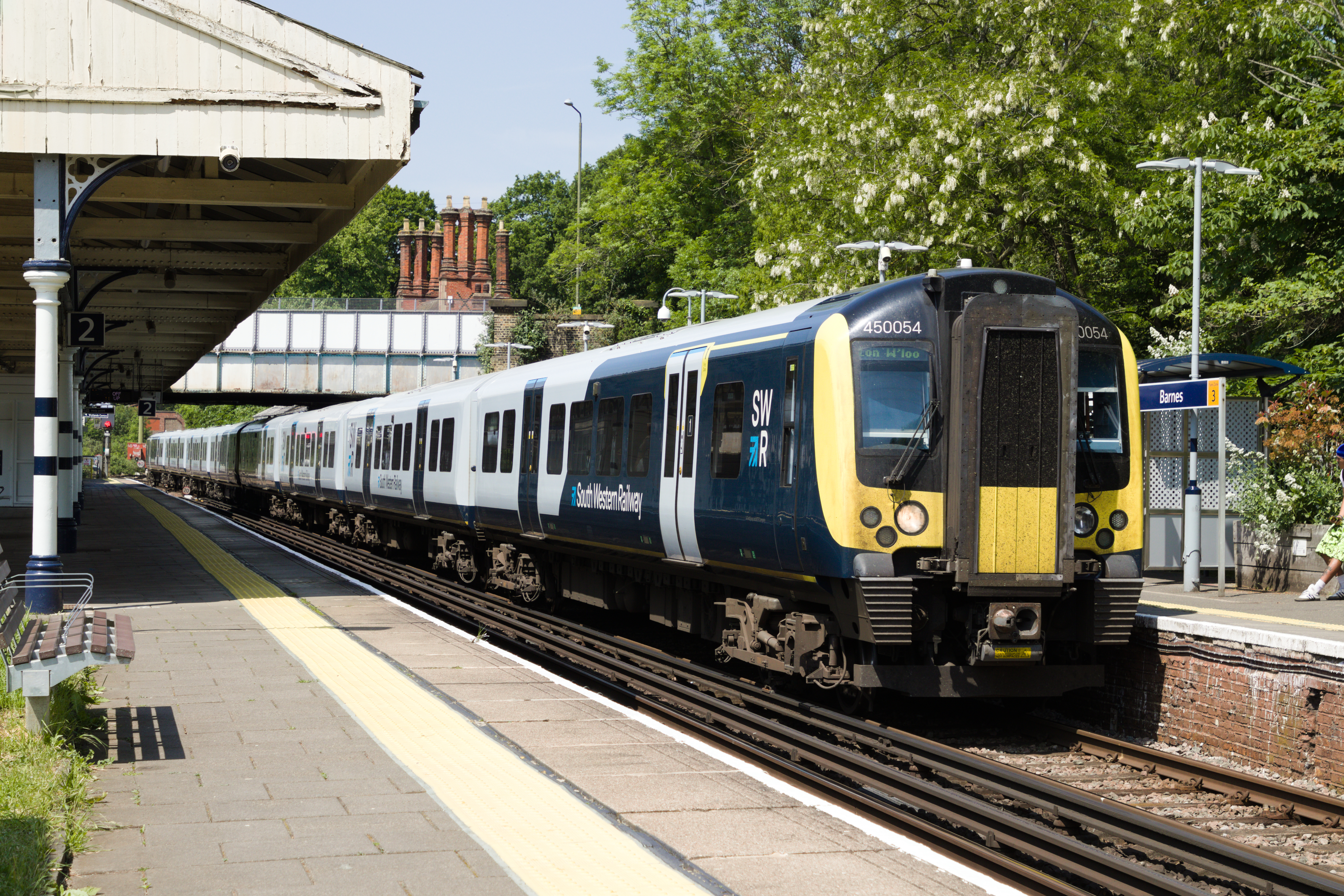
- A South Western Railway Class 450 at Barnes in 2023

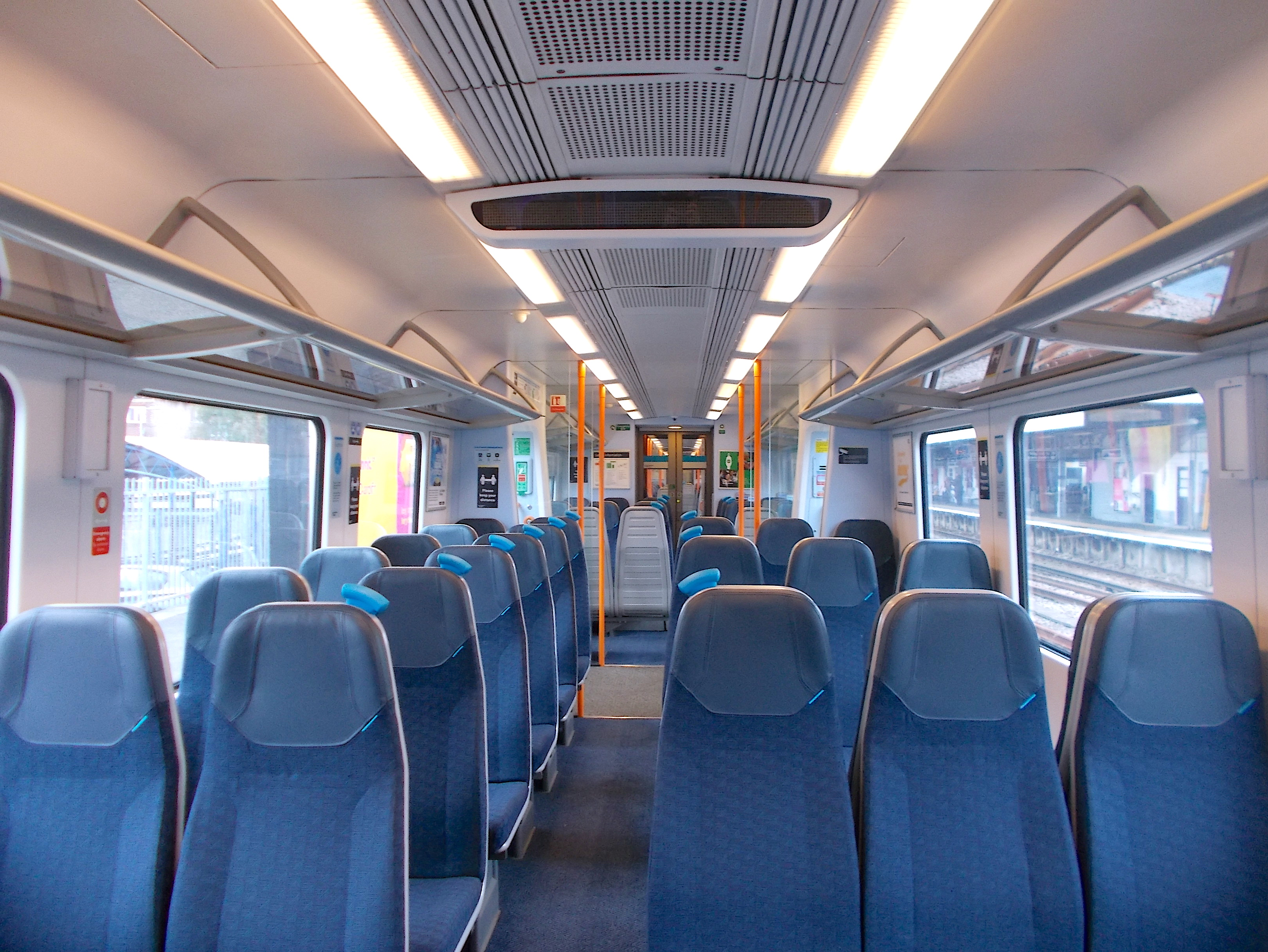
- Refurbished standard-class saloon
- In service: 5 October 2003 – present
- Manufacturer: Siemens Transportation Systems
- Built at: Vienna, Austria; Uerdingen, Germany
- Family name: Desiro
- Replaced: Class 411; Class 412; Class 421; Class 423
- Constructed: 2002–2006
- Refurbished: 2017–2020
- Number built: 127
- Formation: 4 cars per unit: DMOC-TOSL-TOSLW-DMOC
- Fleet numbers: 450001–450127
- Capacity: As built: 264 seats (24 first-class, 240 standard); As refurbished: 285 seats (16 first-class, 269 standard)
- Owner: Angel Trains
- Operator: South Western Railway
- Depot: Northam

Specifications
- Car body construction: Aluminium
- Train length: 81.60 m (267 ft 9 in)
- Car length: 20.34 m (66 ft 9 in)
- Width: 2.796 m (9 ft 2.1 in)
- Floor height: 1.157 m (3 ft 9.6 in)
- Doors: Bi-parting Sliding plug
- Wheel diameter: 850–786 mm (33.46–30.94 in) (new–worn)
- Wheelbase: Bogies: 2.600 m (8 ft 6.4 in)
- Maximum speed: 100 mph (160 km/h)
- Weight: 175.71 tonnes (172.93 long tons; 193.69 short tons)
- Traction system: Siemens SIBAS IGBT
- Traction motors: 8 × Siemens 1TB2016-0GB02 asynchronous three-phase AC
- Power output: 1,500 kW (2,000 hp) (at wheel)
- Tractive effort: Starting: 200 kN (45,000 lb_{f})
- Acceleration: approx. 1 m/s^{2} (3.3 ft/s^{2})
- Electric systems: 750 V DC third rail
- Current collection: Contact shoe
- UIC classification: Bo′Bo′+2′2′+2′2′+Bo′Bo′
- Bogies: Siemens SGP SF5000
- Minimum turning radius: 120 m (393 ft 8 in)
- Braking systems: Electro-pneumatic (disc) and regenerative
- Safety systems: AWS; TPWS
- Coupling system: Dellner 12
- Multiple working: Within class, and with Class 444
- Track gauge: 1,435 mm (4 ft 8 1/2 in) standard gauge

The British Rail Class 450 Desiro is a type of third-rail DC electric multiple unit (EMU) passenger train that entered service during 2003. Used for outer-suburban services, the units were built with both first- and standard-class accommodation. They have a maximum speed of 100 mph (160 km/h).

The Desiro UK family also includes units of Classes 185, 350, 360, 380 and 444.

Along with the Class 444 Desiro, the Class 450 units are operated by South Western Railway.

== Introduction ==
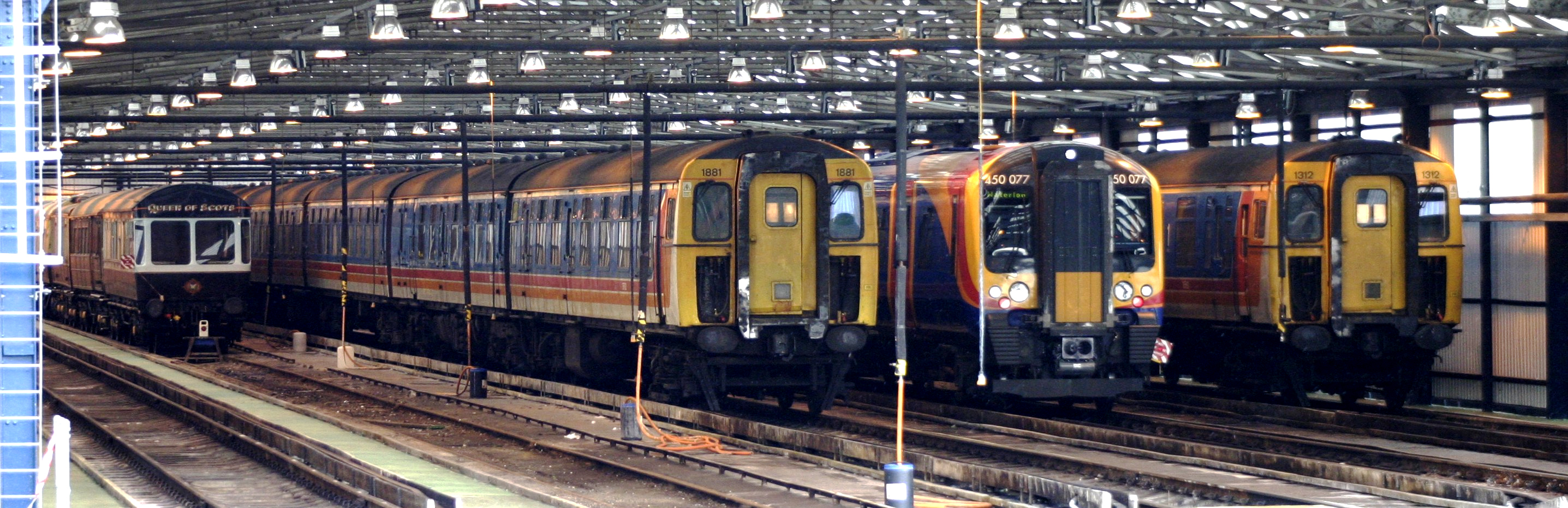
A Class 450 unit between two Class 421s at Clapham Junction depot in February 2005, less than three months before the latter were withdrawn.

In April 2001, 785 vehicles were ordered by South West Trains in order to complete the replacement of its slam-door rolling stock, in accordance with its franchise commitment to do so by 2005, as the slam-door trains, many of which were more than 40 years old, did not meet modern health and safety requirements.

The first Class 450 units began arriving into the UK from Germany in December 2002, units 450007 and 450008, being hauled from Calais-Fréthun to Bournemouth via Dollands Moor and Wembley.

Introduction to service was delayed by the required power supply upgrades capable of powering the new trains, which feature air conditioning, a feature not present in the slam-door trains they replaced. In the December 2004 timetable change, the Class 450 Desiro began serving most intended routes, although introduction was delayed until June 2005 in some areas. The units are leased by Angel Trains to South Western Railway.

Sixty-eight new vehicles were ordered by South West Trains as a replacement to the growth order which was diverted to form the similar Class 350 range of electric multiple units.

== Operations ==
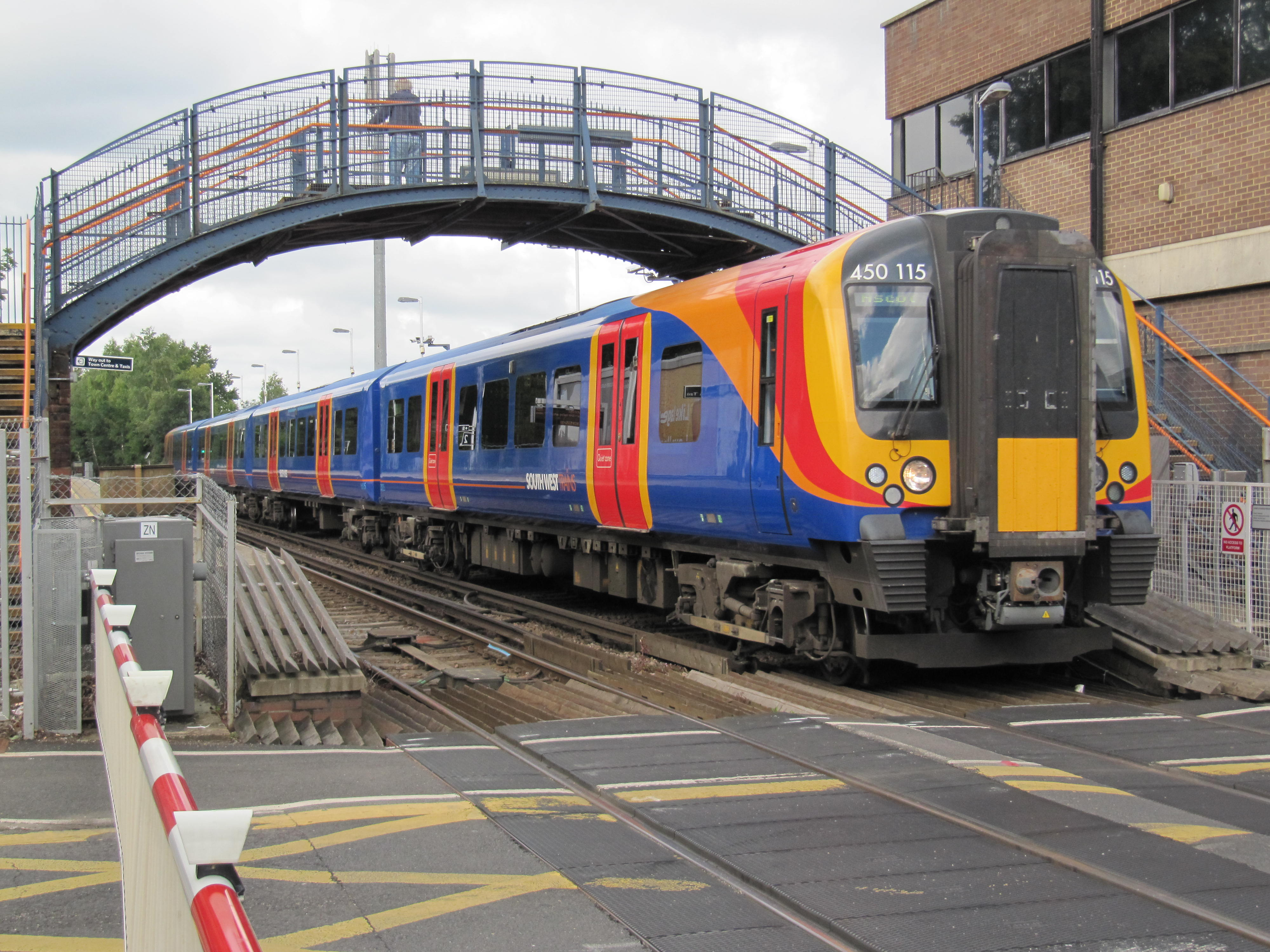
South West Trains Class 450 unit at Camberley in 2011

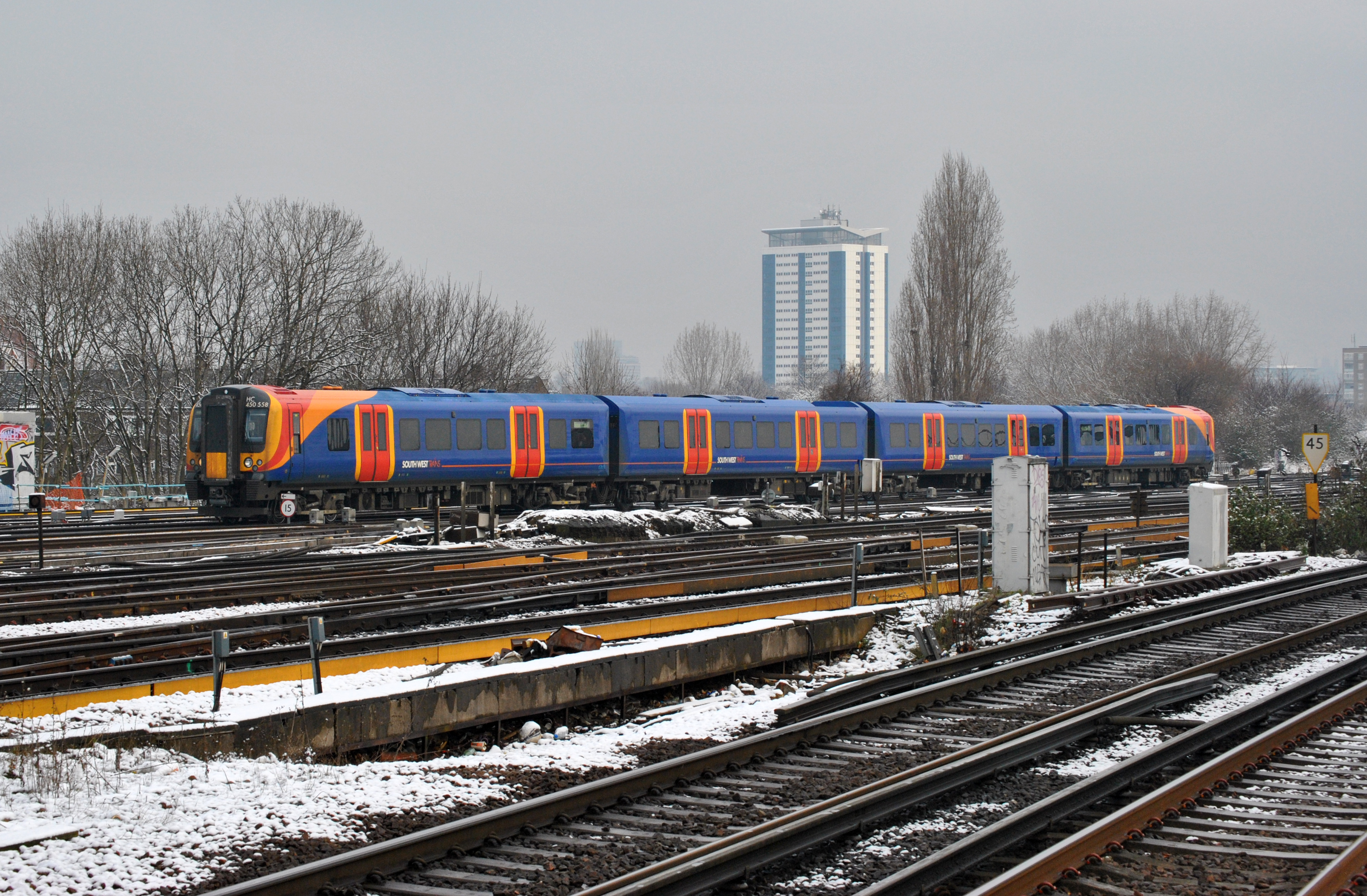
South West Trains Class 450 unit near Clapham Junction in 2012

Class 450 units operate suburban, outer-suburban, and regional services from London Waterloo. They are used on all SWR lines except the non-electrified West of England Main Line and Eastleigh to Romsey Line.

On occasion Class 450 units are also used on the Portsmouth Direct Line for services between Waterloo and Portsmouth Harbour, in place of the intended Class 444. The difference in comfort – particularly the higher-density 2+3 seating arrangement used on the Class 450 fleet – has prompted complaints from some passengers affected by the substitution.

Both the Class 444 and 450 fleets are maintained at the purpose-built Northam Traincare Facility in Southampton, which is equipped to perform both preventative and corrective maintenance, deep-cleaning, and overhauls on up to eight units simultaneously.

In March 2012, the Class 450 fleet, along with the Class 458 and 444 fleets, was fitted with regenerative braking.

=== Class 450/2 and more orders ===
Originally, SWT's order with Siemens was for 100 four-car sets (the current 450/0) and 32 five-car sets, intended as Class 450/2 for inner-suburban use. The Strategic Rail Authority, however, did not agree to the terms required, such as the lengthening of platforms and changes to railway infrastructure. As a result, the 32 five-car sets were cancelled and the 160 vehicles redistributed; an extra 10 four-car sets were added to the SWT order, while the remaining 120 vehicles were then ordered as 30 four-car sets of the dual-voltage Class 350 for Silverlink and Central Trains.

Subsequently, SWT received further 17 four-car sets, bringing the total number of Class 450 units up to 127. These trains were delivered in 2006, not long after the last of the first order was delivered.

=== Class 450/5 modifications ===
In January 2008, 28 Class 450/0 sets were modified and re-numbered in the Class 450/5 series, for use on services between Waterloo and Windsor, the Hounslow Loop Line, as well as between Waterloo and Weybridge. They had their first-class seating removed and replaced with 2+3 formation standard-class seating, and some other seats were removed to provide more standing capacity; extra handrails were also provided. The numbers modified are 450043 to 450070, which have become 450543 to 450570 respectively and displayed the letters HC (denoting 'High Capacity') above the unit number on the front of the sets. The modifications were carried out at the Bournemouth Traincare Depot.

In anticipation of the Class 458/5 modifications for use on the Windsor Lines, the 450/5 sub class had the First Class reinstated, and they are now used generally across the SWR routes. These trains retained their 4505xx number as the standard seating configuration remained different but as they completed their SWR interior refurbishment during late 2019 they were returned to their original numbers.

== Refresh ==
Between 2017 and 2020 First MTR South Western Railway, carried out a refurbishment programme on its Class 450 fleet. As part of this, every unit was deep cleaned with carpets and seat covers replaced and every two seats in standard class have had a plug socket fitted. The 24 first class seats carried in the centre of one of the intermediate trailers were replaced with standard-class rows, while new first-class areas of eight seats each were installed immediately adjacent to each driver's cab. These areas feature leather seats and tables with wireless charging facilities. As part of this work, subclass /5 high-capacity units were similarly refurbished, and returned to their original numbers, meaning that all Class 450s once again share a common layout.

== Accidents and incidents ==
On 6 November 2017, unit 450025 was derailed near Wimbledon. Four people were injured; over 300 passengers were evacuated from the train. The accident was caused by track spread (an increase in the distance between rails), and occurred on a 120-metre (131 yd) stretch of line that had not been inspected or maintained for many years because of a misunderstanding between Network Rail and London Underground as to which company was responsible for its upkeep.

On 4 March 2024, unit 450092 was derailed between Woking and Surbiton stations when it struck an obstruction on the line whilst travelling at a speed of 90 mph (140 km/h). No-one was injured and the train was safely evacuated.

== Fleet details ==
Class	Operator	Qty.	Year built	Cars per unit	Unit nos.
450	South Western Railway	127	2002–2006	4	450001–450127

=== Interiors ===
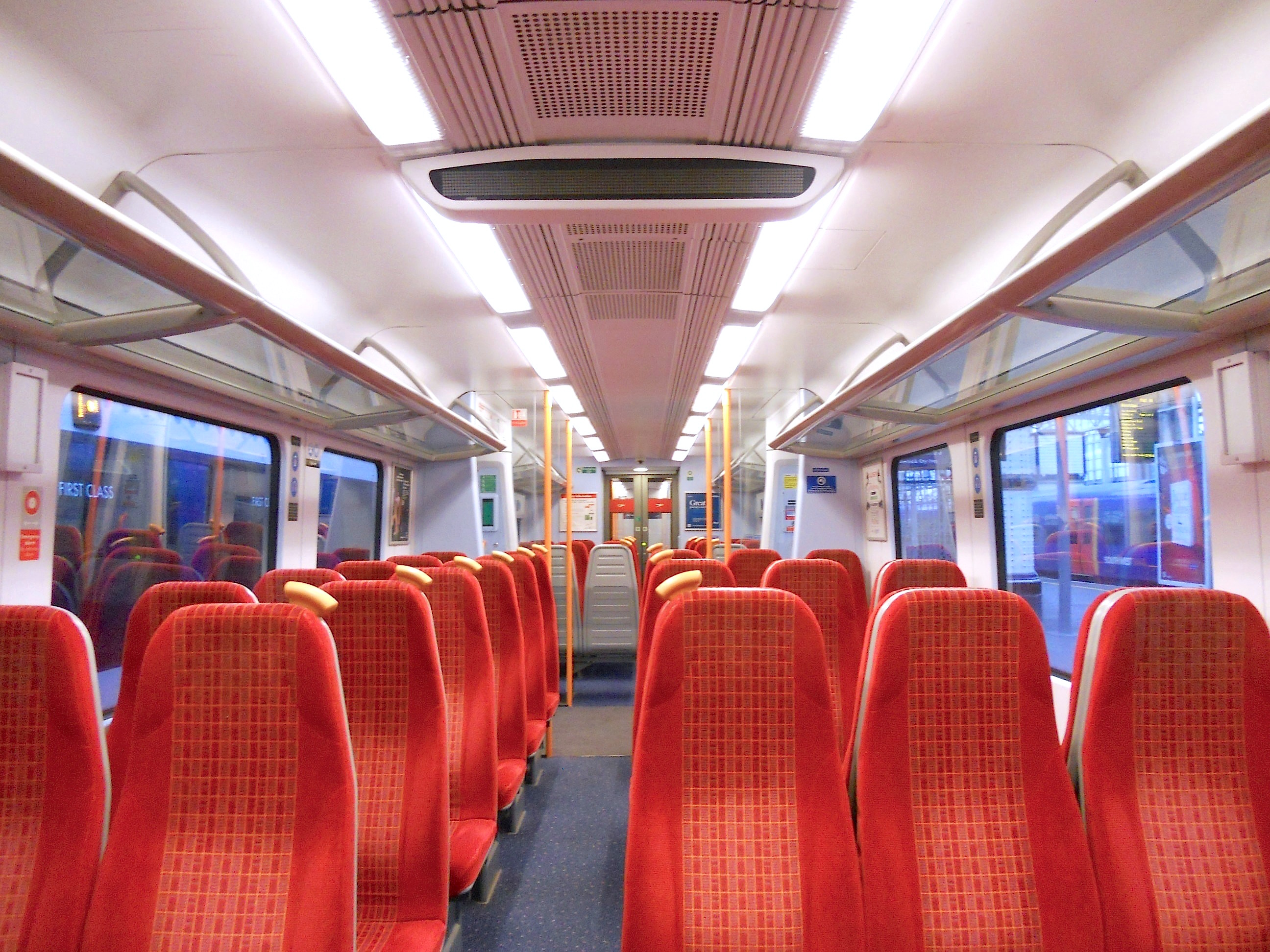
Original standard-class interior in 2012

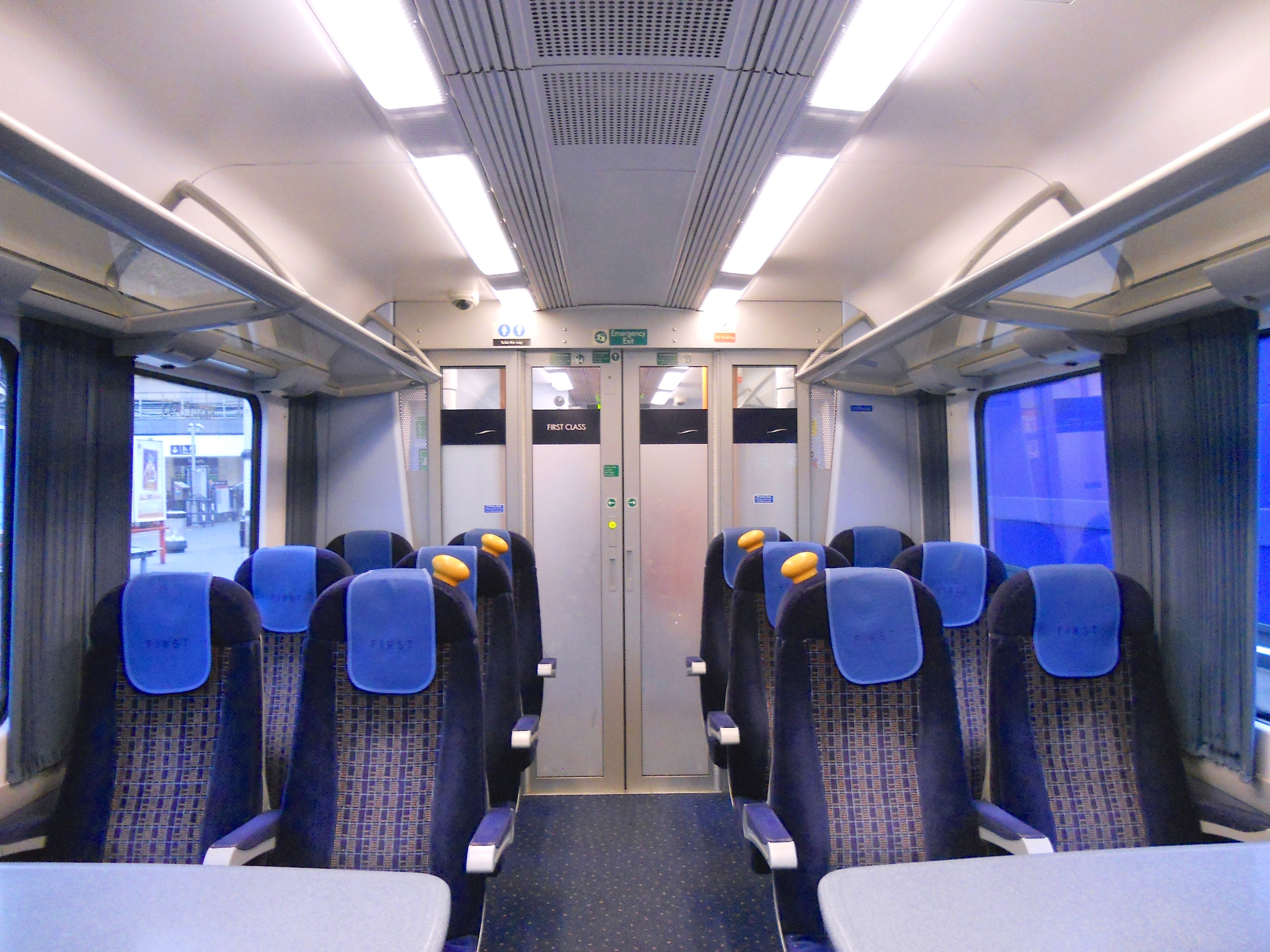
Original first-class interior in 2013

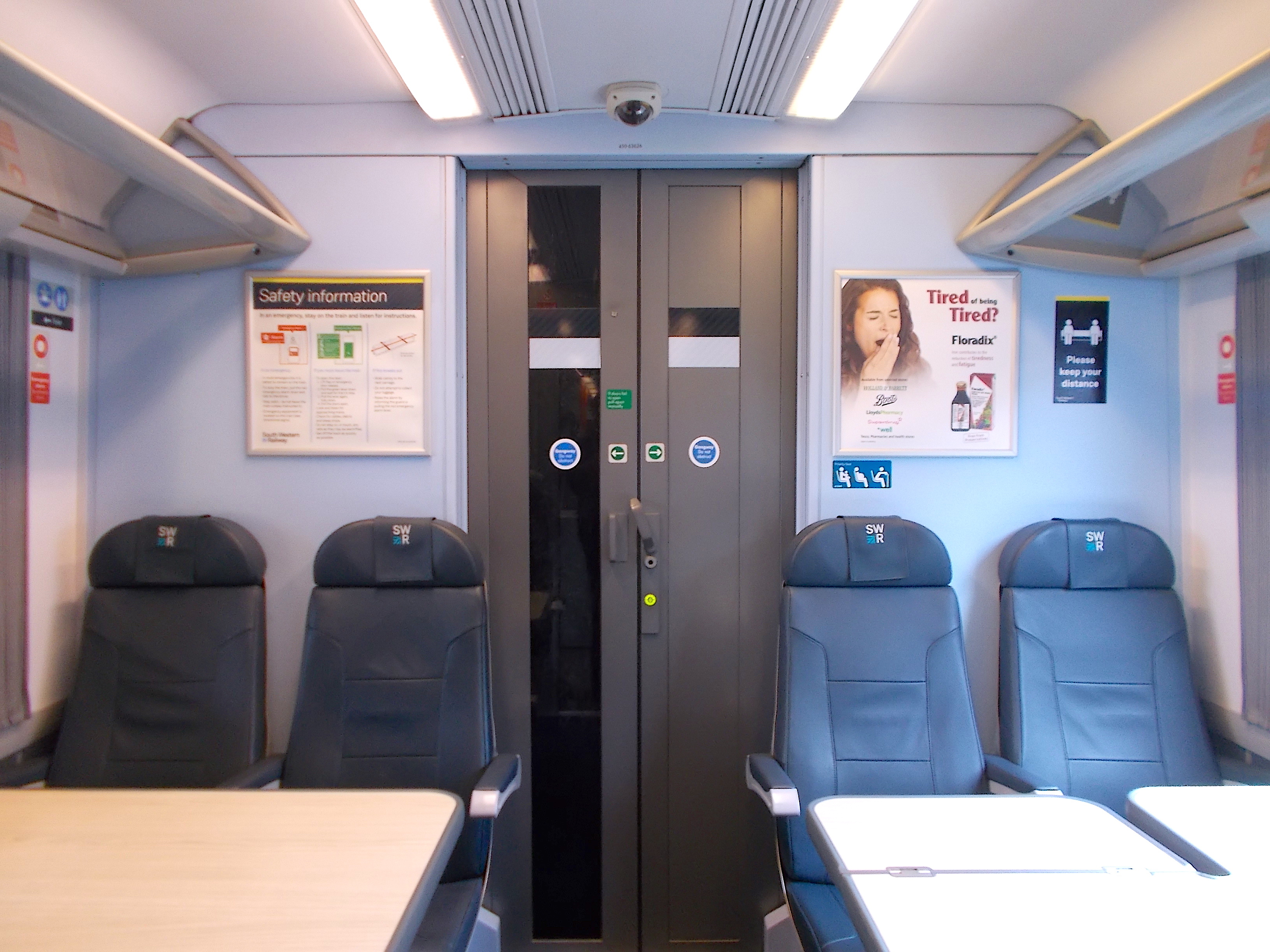
Refurbished first-class interior in 2020

=== Illustration ===
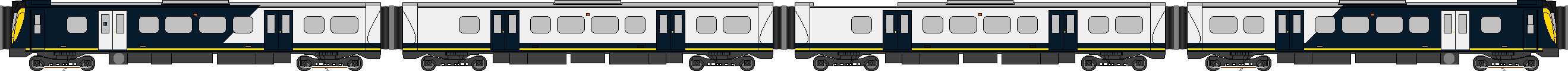
Illustration of a South Western Railway Class 450 unit

=== Named units ===
Some units have been named:

- 450014 - King Athelstan
- 450015 - Desiro
- 450042 - Treloar College
- 450056 - Hotshot
- 450067 - Key Workers - Special livery
- 450100 - Transport Benevolent Fund CIO
- 450114 - Fairbridge Investing in the Future (de-named)
- 450127 - Dave Gunson
