= Saverio Mascolo =

Italian information engineer

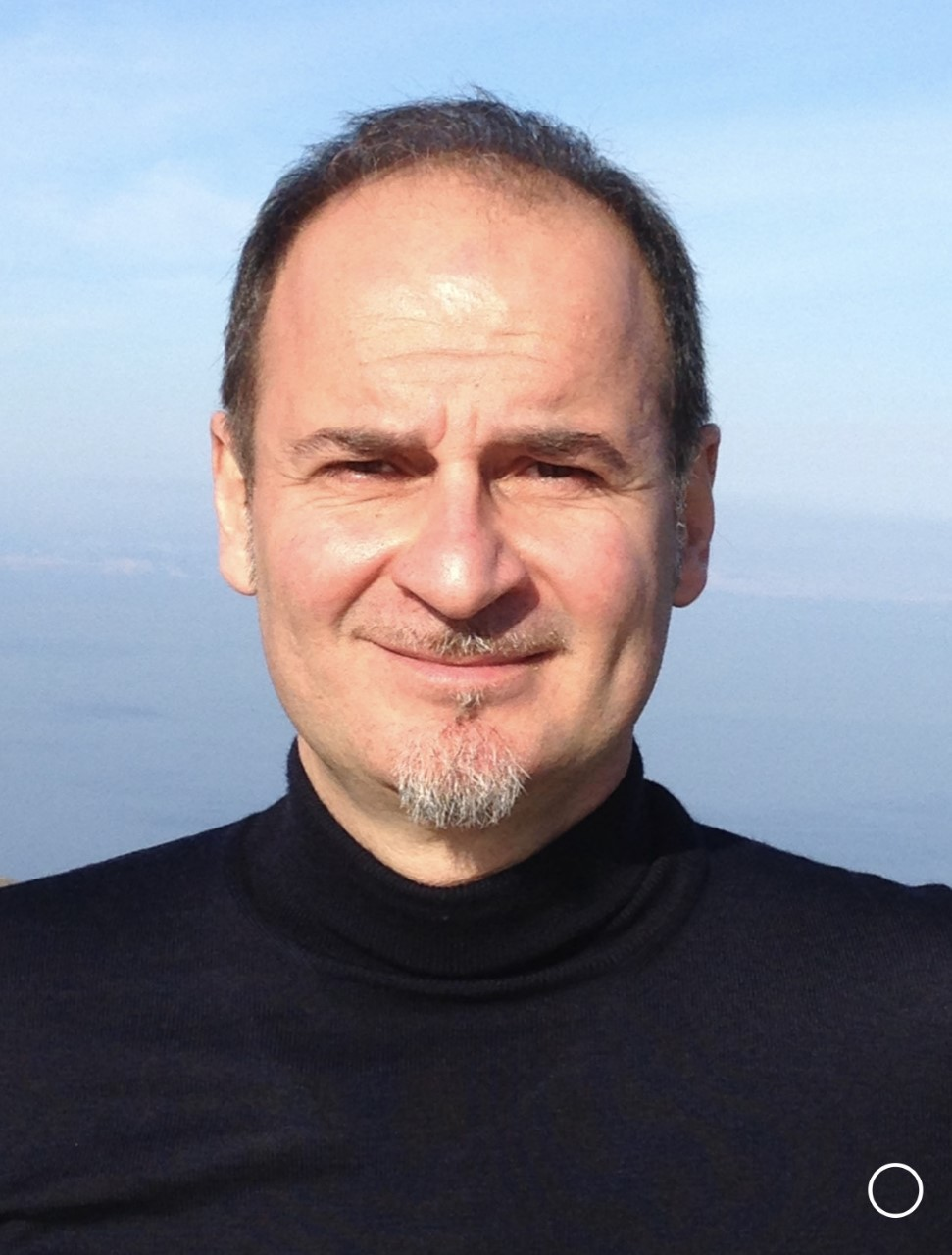
- Born: March 1, 1966 (age 60); Bari, Italy
- Awards: IEEE Fellow; Google Faculty Award; Cisco Academy Research Award

Academic background
- Education: Laurea degree Ph.D
- Alma mater: Politecnico di Bari; University of California, Los Angeles

Academic work
- Institutions: Politecnico di Bari, Italy

Saverio Mascolo is an Italian information engineer, academic and researcher. He is the former Head of the Department of Electrical Engineering and Information Science and the professor of Automatic Control at Department of Ingegneria Elettrica e dell'Informazione (DEI) at Politecnico di Bari, Italy.

Mascolo’s research interests include adaptive video streaming, immersive videoconferencing, congestion control, quality of experience, cloud computing, mobile robotic, and reinforcement learning, manufacturing systems and automatic control.

Mascolo is an IEEE Fellow for contributions to "modeling and control of congestion in packet networks." He is senior member of ACM, member of the IFAC technical committee "Networked systems" and has previously been a member of the Academic Senate of Politecnico di Bari. He has been an Associate Editor of IEEE Transactions on Automatic Control, and is an Associate Editor of ACM/IEEE Transaction on Networking and of Computer Networks Elsevier.

== Education ==
Mascolo received the Laurea degree in electronic engineering in 1991 and his Ph.D. in 1994 from the Department of Electrical and Electronic Engineering at Politecnico di Bari. He was a Post-doc Visiting Scholar at the University of California at Los Angeles, for their Computer Science Department Boelter Hall from 1995 to 1996.

== Career ==
Since 1995, Mascolo has been a Professor of Automatic Control (professore ordinario) at Politecnico di Bari. since 2000, he has been the Scientific Coordinator and founder of the "Control of computing and communication systems Lab (C3lab)" at Politecnico di Bari. From 2001 to 2006, he has been an External Academic Consultant at Uppsala University. In 2012, he founded Quavlive srl and for the period of 2015 to 2021, he has been the Head of the Department of Electrical Engineering and Information Science at Politecnico di Bari and a member of the Academic Senate of Politecnico di Bari. Since 2021, he has been the Scientific Coordinator and founder of the teaching laboratory "Mobile robot and embedded control (Mobirec)".

== Research ==
Mascolo’s research spans over topics such as mobile computing, congestion control, telecommunication control, transport protocols, Asynchronous Transfer Mode, bandwidth allocation, access protocols, video streaming, internet, image resolution, image sequences, and discrete systems among others.

=== Congestion control ===
Mascolo led the research on "Congestion control for web real-time communication" project for making telecommunications possible in real-time, eliminating any delays created on the internet using any browser without the need to install any other programs. This project was assigned the "Google research Award 2014." He discussed computational complexities for proposed restriction policies in a paper and showed a few examples to compare their performances. The modern production facilities of flexible manufacturing systems show a great degree of resource sharing, a position in which deadlocks of circular waits occur. Necessary and sufficient conditions are derived using digraph and theoretical concepts for when deadlocks arise and largely characterize very undesirable situations of second level deadlocks that eventually develop into circular waits in the future. In a study, he investigated the performance of a new TCP protocol with a sender-side modification of the window congestion control scheme, TCP Westwood (TCWP), which is intended to better handle large bandwidth-delay product paths (large pipes), with potential packet loss due to transmission or other errors (leaky pipes), and with dynamic load (dynamic pipes). His "evolution of Westwood TCP" was named Westwood+, and further resulted in a model for fair and friendly sharing of the bottleneck link and a Markov Chain Performance model in presence of link errors. In a research, he used Smith’s principle and the classical control theory for designing an algorithm for controlling the best effort traffic in high-speed ATM networks. With a guarantee of stability, the designed algorithm offers fair and full utilization of network links in a realistic traffic scenario, where there are various propagation delays and several available bit rate connections sharing the network with high priority traffic. He also presented a feedback control algorithm for ATM congestion in another study where source rates are adjusted according to VC queue lengths along the path with intermediate nodes where the goal was to “fill-in” the residual bandwidth, avoiding going beyond the specified queue threshold. The experimental and theoretical results indicate high throughput, despite having queue sizes independent of the round-trip delay.

=== Adaptive video streaming ===
Mascolo proposed a Quality Adaptation Controller (QAC) for live adaptive video streaming which was designed using feedback control theory. When compared to Akamai adaptive video streaming, it was found that QAC is able to regulate the video quality to match the available bandwidth with a transient of less than 30s while ensuring a continuous video reproduction. It also fairly shares the available bandwidth both in the cases of a concurrent TCP greedy connection or a concurrent video streaming flow, and Akamai underutilizes the available bandwidth due to the conservativeness of its heuristic algorithm; additionally, when unexpected available bandwidth reductions occur, the video reproduction is affected. He recommended ELASTIC Feedback Linearization Adaptive Streaming Controller in a paper, which is a client side controller made with feedback control theory that does not create an on-off traffic pattern. Using a testbed with delays and bandwidth capacity set, ELASTIC was compared to other proposed client-side controllers present in the literature and specifically investigated the extent the considered algorithms can fairly share and fully utilize the bottleneck, and also get a fair share in case video flows share the bottleneck with TCP greedy flows. The results indicated that ELASTIC achieves a very high fairness and gets a fair share when it coexists with TCP greedy flows.

=== Cloud computing ===
Google proposed Quick UDP Internet Connections(QUIC) in 2012 as a reliable protocol on top of UDP as to reduce Web Page retrieval time which Moscolo studied in a paper. Firstly, he checked if QUIC can be safely deployed in the internet and then the web page load time was evaluated in comparison with HTTP and SPDY. With respect to HTTP, QUIC reduces the overall page retrieval time when there is a channel without induced random losses and in case of a lossy channel, it outperforms SPDY. When enabled, the performance of QUIC worsens because of the FEC module. He studied the new Akamai services aimed at measuring how fast the video quality tracks the internet available bandwidth and to what degree the service is able to ensure continuous video distribution with all of the abrupt changes in the available bandwidth. The main results of the study were that the video client computes the available bandwidth and sends a feedback signal to the server that selects the video at the bitrate that matches the available bandwidth, any video is encoded at five different bit rates with each level stored on the server, and a feedback control law is employed to ensure that the player buffer length tracks a desired buffer length. Moreover, the video bitrate matches the available bandwidth in roughly 150 seconds and when an abrupt variation of the available bandwidth occurs, the suitable video level is selected after roughly 14 seconds and the video reproduction is affected by short interruptions.

=== Chaotic systems ===
Mascolo developed a general methodology for designing chaotic and hyperchaotic cryptosystems with the basic idea to make the decrypter a non-linear observer for the state of the encrypter. The advantages of the suggested approach are discussed in detail and particularly the utilization of hyperchaos-based cryptosystems along with their increased complexity of the transmitted signal, contribute to the development of communication systems with higher security.

=== Technology transfer ===
Mascolo is the founder of Quavlive] srl, an academic spinoff active in videostreaming and videoconferencing.

== Awards/honors ==
- 2013 - Cisco Academy Research Award, Cisco US "Architecture for Robust and Efficient Control of Dynamic Adaptive Video Streaming over HTTP"
- 2014 - Google Faculty Award, Google US for the research entitled "Congestion Control for Web Real-Time Communication (WebRTC)"
- 2018 - Fellow, IEEE for "contributions to modeling and control of congestion in packet networks"

== Bibliography ==
- Mascolo, S. (1999). Congestion control in high-speed communication networks using the Smith principle. Automatica, 35(12), 1921-1935.
- Mascolo, S., Casetti, C., Gerla, M., Sanadidi, M. Y., & Wang, R. (2001, July). TCP Westwood: Bandwidth estimation for enhanced transport over wireless links. In Proceedings of the 7th annual international conference on Mobile computing and networking (pp. 287-297).
- Casetti, C., Gerla, M., Mascolo, S., Sanadidi, M. Y., & Wang, R. (2002). TCP Westwood: end-to-end congestion control for wired/wireless networks. Wireless Networks, 8(5), 467-479.
- Grieco, L. A., & Mascolo, S. (2004). Performance evaluation and comparison of Westwood+, New Reno, and Vegas TCP congestion control. ACM SIGCOMM Computer Communication Review, 34(2), 25-38.
- De Cicco, L., & Mascolo, S. (2010). A mathematical model of the Skype VoIP congestion control algorithm. IEEE Transactions on Automatic Control, 55(3), 790-795.
- De Cicco, L., Caldaralo, V., Palmisano, V., & Mascolo, S. (2013, December). ELASTIC: A client-side controller for dynamic adaptive streaming over HTTP (DASH). In 2013 20th International Packet Video Workshop (pp. 1-8). IEEE.
- De Cicco, L., & Mascolo, S. (2013). An adaptive video streaming control system: Modeling, validation, and performance evaluation. IEEE/ACM Transactions on Networking, 22(2), 526-539.
- Cofano, G., De Cicco, L., & Mascolo, S. (2016). Modeling and design of adaptive video streaming control systems. IEEE Transactions on Control of Network Systems, 5(1), 548-559.
- Fanti, M. P., Maione, B., Mascolo, S., & Turchiano, A. (1997). Event-based feedback control for deadlock avoidance in flexible production systems. IEEE Transactions on Robotics and automation, 13(3), 347-363.
- Grassi, G., & Mascolo, S. (1997). Nonlinear observer design to synchronize hyperchaotic systems via a scalar signal. IEEE Transactions on Circuits and Systems I: Fundamental Theory and Applications, 44(10), 1011-1014.
