= Toni Mascolo =

Italian-British hairdresser and businessman (1942–2017)

Toni Mascolo OBE
- Born: Giuseppe Mascolo; 6 May 1942; Scafati, Campania, Italy
- Died: 10 December 2017 (aged 75)
- Occupations: hairdresser and businessman
- Known for: Co-founder of hairdressing chain Toni & Guy
- Spouse: Pauline O'Donnell
- Children: 3
- Relatives: Anthony Mascolo (brother)

Giuseppe "Toni" Mascolo (6 May 1942 – 10 December 2017) was an Italian-born British hairdresser and businessman, and the co-founder of hairdressing chain Toni & Guy with his brother Gaetano "Guy" Mascolo.

== Early life ==
He was the eldest of five sons of Francesco Mascolo, who ran a barber shop and hair salon in Scafati, Campania, southern Italy, and his wife Maria Mascolo (née Gallo).

== Career ==
In 1963, Toni Mascolo and his brother Guy opened their first salon in Clapham, London.

By 2000, there were 112 salons, 27 of them outside the UK.

Mascolo was the chief executive until his death in 2017.

== Personal life ==
In 1970, he married Pauline O'Donnell, who had started working for them as an assistant in 1963. They had three children - Sacha and Christian run the company, and Pierre is a film producer.

== Honours ==
In 2008, Mascolo was appointed an Honorary Officer of the Order of the British Empire (OBE) for services to hairdressing.
