= Toni & Guy =

British chain of hairdressing salons

- Industry: Hairdressing
- Founded: 1963; 63 years ago
- Founder: Toni Mascolo; Guy Mascolo
- Headquarters: London, England
- Area served: Worldwide
- Key people: Sacha Mascolo-Tarbuck (CEO)
- Website: toniandguy.com

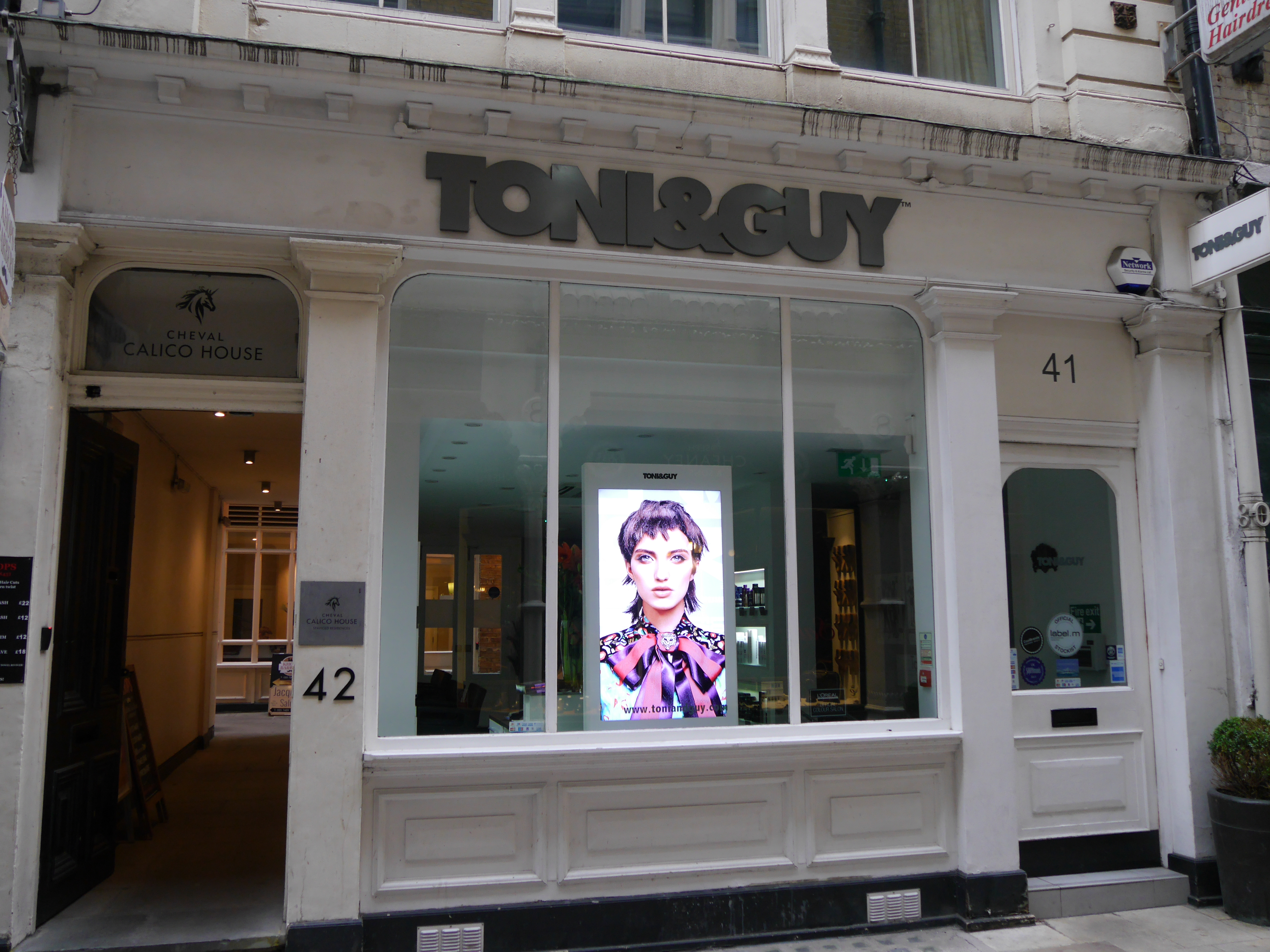
Toni & Guy, Bow Lane, London EC4, 2018

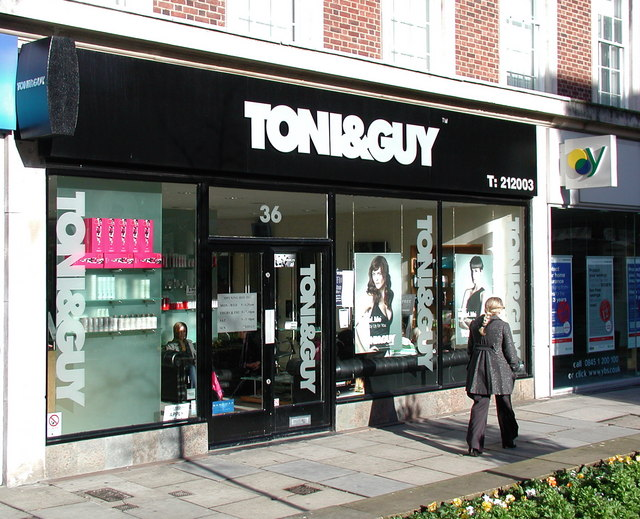
Toni & Guy, Paragon Street, Hull, England

Toni & Guy (stylised as TONI&GUY) is a British international chain of hairdressing salons founded in the UK in 1963 by brothers Toni and Guy Mascolo.

== History ==
In 1963, Toni Mascolo and his brother Guy opened their first salon in Clapham, London.

In 1985, the company opened its first salon outside Europe, in Dallas, Texas. It also launched the TIGI product line. In 1990, the Toni & Guy Hairdressing Academy was opened.

In 2009, the TIGI product line was acquired by Unilever for £296 million.

In January 2019, Nigel Darwin was appointed as CEO, after a 12-month search to replace the previous CEO (and co-founder), Toni Mascolo, who died in December 2017.

As of 2022, there are 457 salons in 41 countries.
