= South Central Trains =

South Central Trains may refer to one of the following organisations that has operated the South Central franchise in England:

- Network SouthCentral
- Connex South Central
- Southern (train operating company)
