= Purley rail crash =

1989 train crash in south London

Coordinates: 51.3399°N 0.1100°W

Purley station rail crash

Details
- Date: 4 March 1989; 13:39
- Location: Purley
- Country: England
- Line: Brighton Main Line
- Operator: Network SouthEast
- Cause: Signal passed at danger

Statistics
- Trains: 2
- Deaths: 5
- Injured: 88

The Purley station rail crash was a train collision that occurred just to the north of Purley railway station in the London Borough of Croydon on Saturday 4 March 1989, leaving five dead and 88 injured. The collision was caused by the driver of one of the trains passing a signal at danger; he pleaded guilty to manslaughter and was sentenced to 12 months in prison plus six months suspended, although this was reduced to four months upon appeal, and overturned in 2007. The Department of Transport report noted that the signal had a high incidence of being passed at danger, and recommended that an automatic train protection system should be introduced without delay, and that in the interim a repeater for the signal that had been passed be installed.

== Collision ==
On 4 March 1989 the 12:50 Horsham to London Victoria, consisting of a four-car class 423 electric multiple unit no. 3441, stopped at Purley railway station. As it left the station, it crossed from the slow line to the fast line as scheduled, and at 13:39 was struck from behind by the following 12:17 Littlehampton to London Victoria, consisting of four-car class 421 units nos. 1280 and 1295 (a total of eight cars). The first six coaches of the Littlehampton train left the track and came off the embankment, killing five passengers and injuring 88.

== Aftermath ==
The first calls to the emergency services came from members of the public. The driver of a light engine running on an adjacent track saw the collision and contacted the signalbox. The signalling equipment had been damaged in the collision and alarms had sounded in the box. The signalmen in the box spoke to railway control at Waterloo, but due to confusion about the location of the trains, police in East Sussex were first contacted. The collision had tripped circuit breakers controlling the DC traction current, but safety could not be assured as the supervisory circuits had been damaged. The incident was attended by British Transport Police, the fire brigade and the ambulance service, and a police helicopter was used to fly doctors to the site. Passengers who were able to walk were evacuated via Purley station, the last casualty being taken to hospital at about 15:15; the search however continued until 17:00.

The railway was closed until 6 March, although the damaged vehicles that lay on the embankment side were not all removed until 9 March. The crossover was replaced, and normal operations were restored on 27 March.

== Trial, report and appeals ==
Before the Ministry of Transport report was published, Robert Morgan – the driver of the Littlehampton train – pleaded guilty to manslaughter and was sentenced to 12 months in prison plus six months suspended.

The report, published in 1989, found no fault in the Littlehampton train or signalling system, and concluded that the driver had failed to keep the train's speed under control, missing the preceding caution signal and passing the danger signal protecting the Horsham train. The line is equipped with four aspect colour light signalling and British Rail's Automatic Warning System (AWS). However the report noted that the signal had a high incidence of being passed at danger – four drivers had previously passed the signal when at danger in the previous five years. The AWS in use gave the same warning for either of the caution signals and danger, and was capable of being reset by a driver in a lapse of concentration. The report recommended that an automatic train protection system should be introduced without delay, and that in the interim a repeater for the signal that had been passed be installed.

Morgan's sentence was later reduced on appeal to four months, and on 12 December 2007 his conviction for manslaughter was overturned by the Court of Appeal, ruling the conviction unsafe as "something about the infrastructure of this particular junction was causing mistakes to be made", as new evidence showed that there had been four previous signals passed at danger at the same location in the five years before the crash. He died in March 2009, aged 66, as a result of drowning whilst sailing in the River Medina on the Isle of Wight.

== Legacy ==
A memorial garden was created at the station to commemorate the accident.

== References and notes ==
=== Bibliography ===
- Cooksey, A. (27 October 1989). Report on the Collision that occurred on 4th March 1989 at Purley (Report). Her Majesty's Stationery Office – via The Railways Archive.
