= British Rail Class 424 =

Prototype electric train used in 1997

- Class 424 vehicle on display at London Victoria in 1998
- In service: 1997
- Manufacturers: Holgate Road carriage works Adtranz (reconstruction)
- Constructed: 1965; 1997 (reconstruction)
- Number built: 1 vehicle
- Number scrapped: 1 vehicle
- Capacity: 77
- Operator: Adtranz (technology demonstrator)

Specifications
- Maximum speed: 100 mph (161 km/h)

The British Rail Class 424 "Networker Classic" was a prototype electric multiple unit (EMU) built in 1997 by Adtranz at Derby Litchurch Lane Works from a Class 421 driving trailer vehicle.

== Project ==
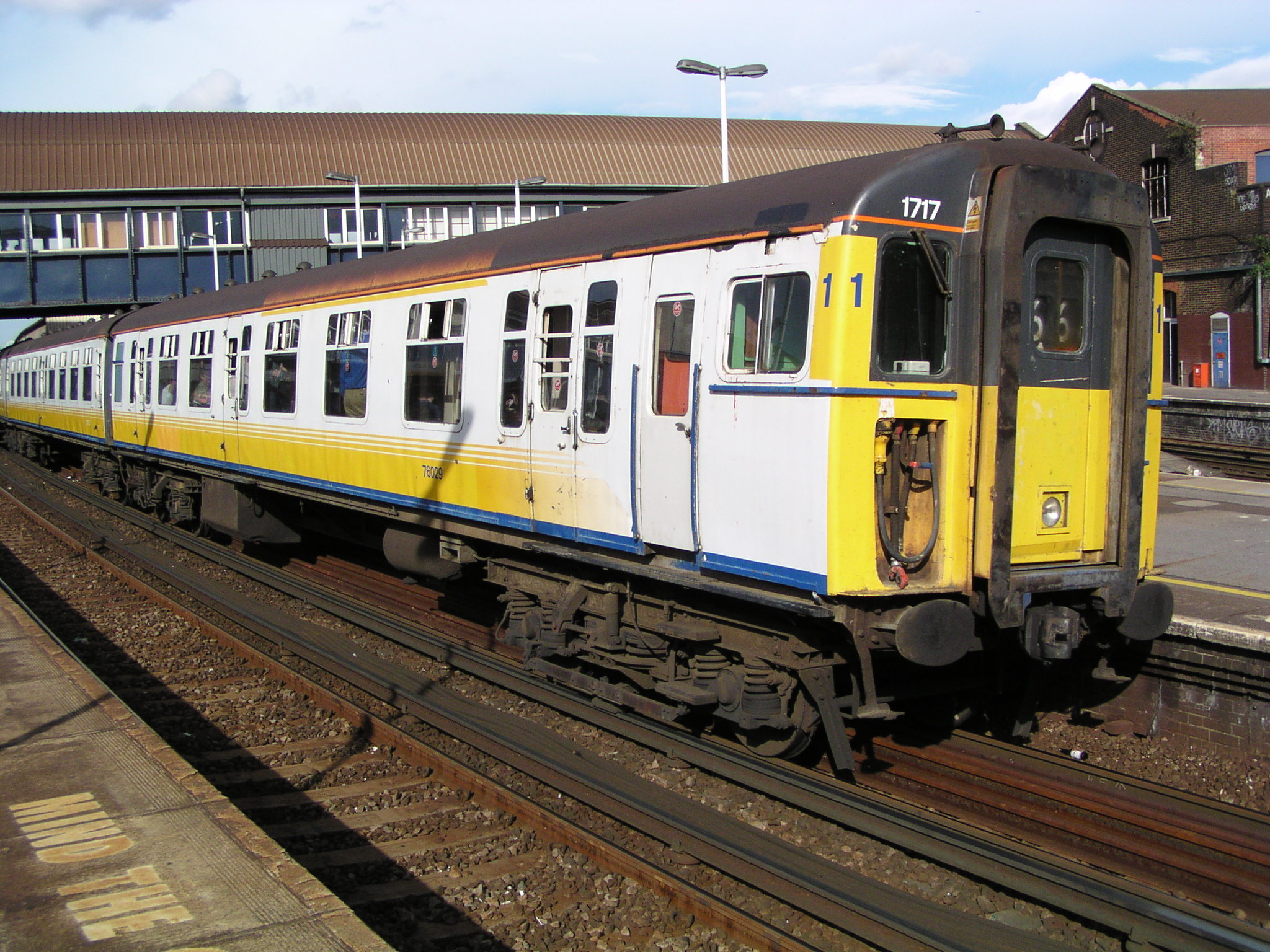
4 Cig vehicle similar to the one converted

The "Networker Classic" concept involved rebuilding Mark 1 design Southern Region EMUs of Classes 411, 421 and 423 to meet current crashworthiness standards and have electric sliding doors instead of slam doors. This involved building a new bodyshell on the existing chassis, but keeping the original electrical and motor equipment. Therefore, the aim was to produce a 'new' unit at one quarter the cost of manufacturing a train from scratch. The rebuilt units would have had a life of at least fifteen years, thus saving considerable amounts of money when replacing old stock. The unit is known for its similar looks with the British Rail Class 170 and the British Rail Class 357, albeit using pocket doors more similar to the subsequent classes 376 and 378, and unlike said trains used pocket doors for the driver cab doors, like those of the 1972 design and earlier Mark 3-derived units.

== Prototype ==
One vehicle, no. 76112 from 'Phase 1' 4Cig unit 1749, was rebuilt as a prototype in 1997. This saw the original Mark 1 bodyshell removed from the chassis at Doncaster Works, and replaced with a new one at Derby Litchurch Lane Works resembling a then brand new Turbostar train installed. The controls from the 4Cig unit were retained in the driving cab. It was displayed to the public at London Victoria, paired with unrebuilt DT 76747 from 4Big unit 2256 for comparison purposes. The converted vehicle had a total capacity of 77 passengers in Standard Class only; had the full 4-car unit undergone the same conversion, then it would have had capacity for up to 310 passengers.

The prototype unit had not carried passengers throughout its life, as the electric controls were unsuitable for the Class 424.

Although Connex South Central had at one stage proposed ordering some, the train companies turned to new-build rolling stock, which saw the introduction of the Electrostar, Desiro and Juniper families. As a result, the single Class 424 vehicle was stored at Derby Litchurch Lane Works until 2012, when it was removed for disposal. The unrebuilt 4Cig trailer (unit 1399), which paired with the vehicle, is under restoration at the East Kent Railway.

== Fleet Details ==
| Class | Operator | No. Built | Year built | Cars per Set |
|---|---|---|---|---|
| Class 424 | Scrapped | 1 | 1997 | 1 |
