= Network SouthCentral =

- Company type: Subsidiary
- Industry: Shadow franchise
- Predecessor: Network SouthEast
- Founded: 4 February 1994; 32 years ago, in London, England, United Kingdom
- Defunct: 13 October 1996
- Fate: Dissolved
- Successor: Connex South Central
- Headquarters: London, United Kingdom
- Area served: London, South East
- Parent: British Rail Board

Network SouthCentral (NSC) was a shadow franchise that existed from 4 February 1994 to 12 October 1996, when the new South Central franchise, operated by Connex South Central (who initially operated this shadow franchise from 26 May 1996 until 12 October 1996) took over. The franchise is now part of the Thameslink, Southern and Great Northern franchise operated by Greater Thameslink Railway under the Southern brand. As with all shadow franchises, Network SouthCentral was a wholly owned subsidiary of the British Railways Board.

== Origins ==
In the lead up to the privatisation of British Rail, Network SouthEast was divided into a series of shadow franchises. Network SouthCentral was formed in February 1994.

== Geographical Area ==
Network SouthCentral covered most of Sussex and parts of East Surrey. The core of NSC's operations was the Brighton Main Line, with most other NSC mainline services utilising some part of this alignment. The rough boundaries of the NSC operations were from Hastings in the east to Portsmouth in the west, although services operated by the company did extend further on both sides to Southampton along the West Coastway line in the west, and as the sole operator of the Marshlink line from Hastings to Ashford via Rye.

In London, the company served two major mainline terminals; London Victoria and Charing Cross. NSC's suburban services concentrated on the area directly to the south of these two stations, with routes serving most of south London, including Clapham Junction, Peckham, Tattenham Corner, East Croydon, Caterham, Sutton and Crystal Palace.

The main former Network SouthEast "sub-sectors" that came under the jurisdiction of NSC were the Sussex Coast, Oxted, South London and Marshlink lines.

== Stock ==
During the short time in which NSC existed as an active train operating company, the company ordered no new rolling stock, nor received any new trains that had been ordered, though not delivered, before Network SouthEast handed over operations to NSC. However, the company operated the following types of locomotive, EMU and DEMU:

Class	Image	Qty.	Power	Carriages	Notes
09		2	Diesel; Shunter	N/A	NSC owned a couple Class 09/0 locomotives for shunting and marshalling stock at Brighton and Selhurst carriage sidings and depots
205			DEMU	2 or 3	
207			DEMU	3	
319			EMU	4	
411			EMU	4	
421			EMU	4	
423			EMU	4	
455			EMU	4	
456			EMU	2	
457		1	EMU	4	

== Livery ==
NSC branding was standard Network SouthEast lettering and design, but with the word "SouthCentral" in dark blue replacing the word "SouthEast" on leaflets, platforms and stock. The Network SouthEast "rhombus" red, blue and grey logo remained part of NSC's corporate image. Not all stock received NSC branding—the chief units to receive such treatment were NSC's express units—the Class 319s, 421s and 422s in the main being treated. As under NSE, the main corporate colour of Network SouthCentral was red, which was applied to all manner of things from rubbish bins to lamp-posts.

== The Cowden rail accident ==
The only major accident that occurred on the NSC network was the Cowden rail crash when, on 15 October 1994, the driver of a Class 205 failed to see a red signal (this was believed to have been caused by fog), and drove the unit on to a single track section of the Uckfield line, where it collided with a train travelling in the opposite direction. Five people, including the erroneous driver were killed, and thirteen more were severely injured.

== Buyout ==
On 13 October 1996, the franchise was privatised with the new South Central franchise operated by Connex South Central taking over. The first unit to lose its NSC/NSE colours was 456024, which officially launched the new franchise.
