= British Rail Class 421 =

British class of electric multiple units

British Rail Class 421 (4-CIG)
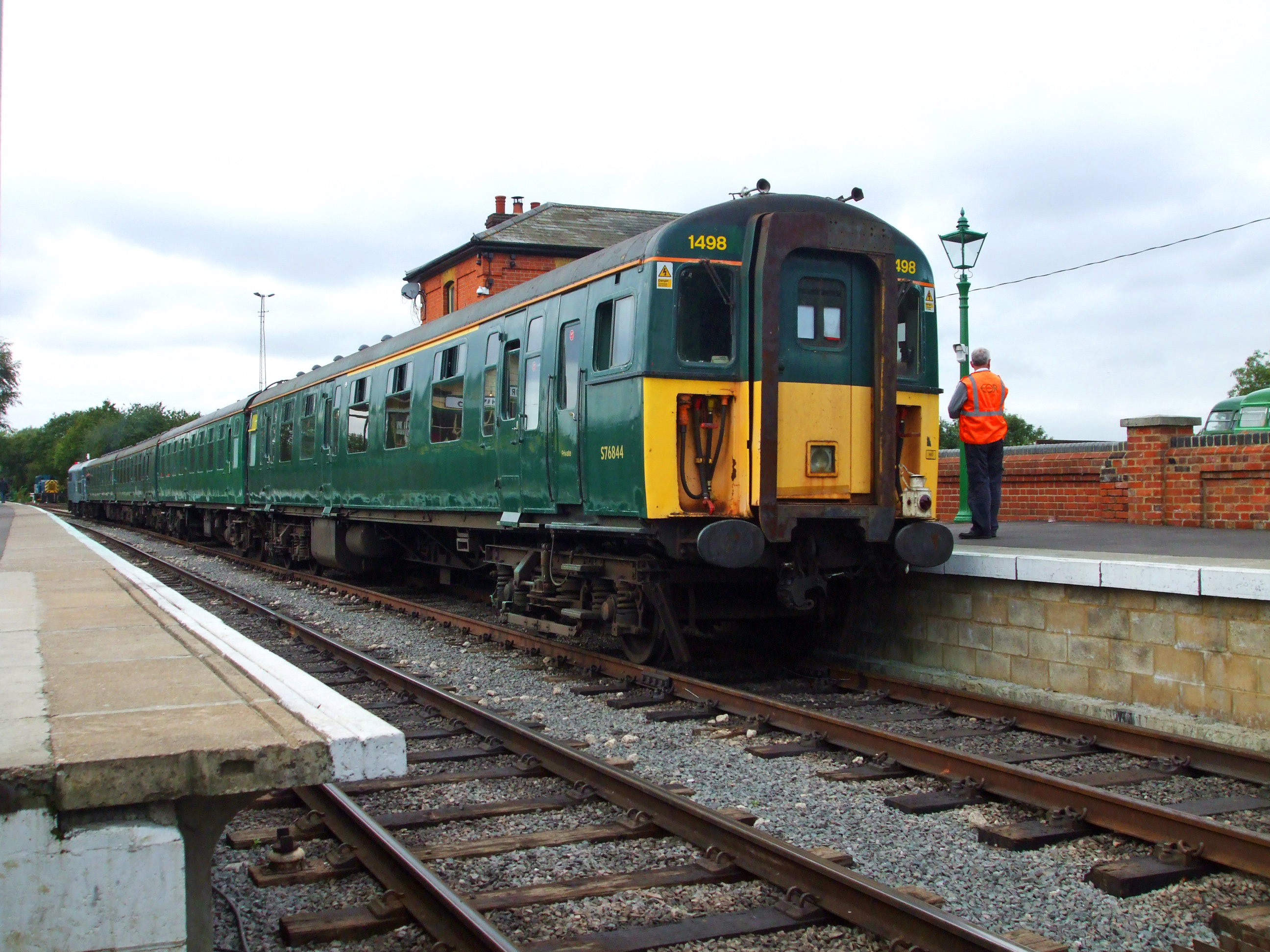
- Class 421/7 no. 1498 at North Weald in 2012

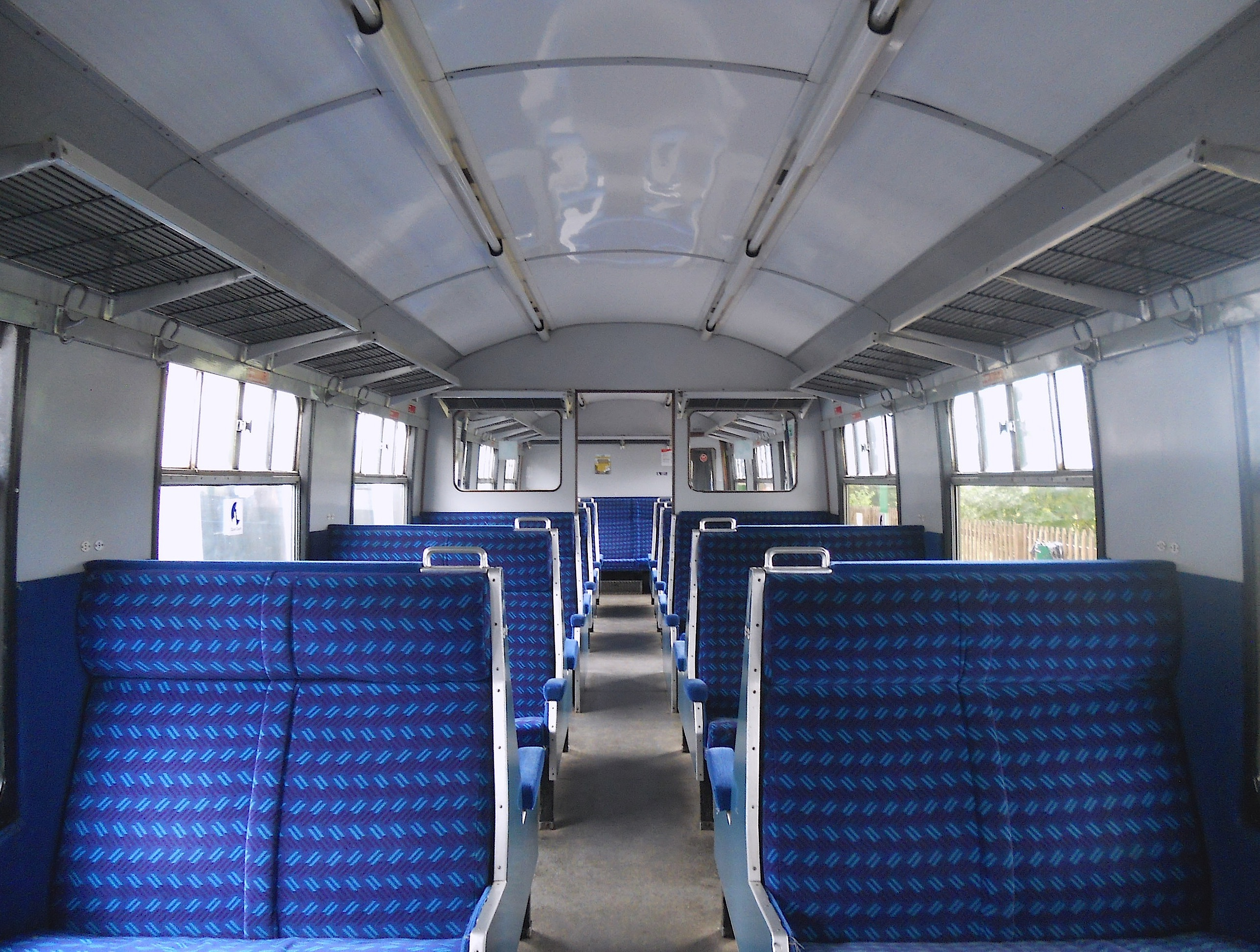
- The interior of a standard class carriage
- In service: 1964-2005 (Main line); 1964-2010 (Lymington branch)
- Manufacturers: Holgate Road carriage works, York, England
- Number built: 166 (Note: 138 Class 421 (4-CIG) and 28 Class 422 (4-BIG).)
- Formation: Driving trailer + Motor coach + Trailer/Buffet + Driving trailer
- Design code: 4-CIG
- Operators: British Rail; South West Trains; Connex South Central; Connex South Eastern; Network SouthEast; Southern; South Eastern Trains

Specifications
- Train length: 265 feet 8 1/2 inches (80.988 m)
- Width: 9 feet 3 inches (2.82 m)
- Height: 12 ft 9 1/4 in (3.893 m)
- Maximum speed: 90 mph (145 km/h)
- Weight: 150 long tons (152 tonnes; 168 short tons)
- Traction motors: Four
- Power output: 4x 250 hp (190 kW); Total: 1,000 hp (750 kW)
- Electric systems: 750 V DC third rail
- Current collection: Contact shoe
- Coupling system: Drop-head buckeye
- Track gauge: 4 ft 8 1/2 in (1,435 mm) standard gauge

The British Rail Class 421 (4-CIG) (Note: CIG stands for Corridor Brighton.) electric multiple units were built at British Rail's Holgate Road carriage works in York, England, between 1964 and 1972. The trains were built in two batches and were initially introduced on services on the Brighton Main Line; later, they were introduced on services to Portsmouth. They replaced older Southern Railway-designed trains, such as the 5-BEL Brighton Belle and 4-COR. The fleet's lifespan was 46 years.

== Design ==
=== Standard fleet ===
These contained only passenger accommodation and formed the bulk of the fleet. They were unusual in that all four traction motors were mounted on one non-driving motor coach. Trains consisted of two driving trailers, sandwiching the non-driving motor coach and an intermediate trailer.

Trains were built in two batches: 'Phase 1' units were built from 1963 to 1966 for the Brighton Line and were numbered 7301-36; these were followed in 1970-72 by the 'Phase 2' units, built primarily for the Portsmouth Direct line, numbered 7337-438.

=== 4-BIG fleet ===
The 4-BIGs were similar to the class standard, but contained a buffet car in place of the intermediate trailer. They were also built in two batches: 'Phase 1' trains were built in 1965/66 and were numbered 7031-48; 'phase 2s' were built in 1970 and were numbered 7049-58.

The 4-BIG fleet were initially classified as Class 420 by British Rail, under the TOPS system introduced in 1968, and then Class 422.

== Vehicle numbering ==
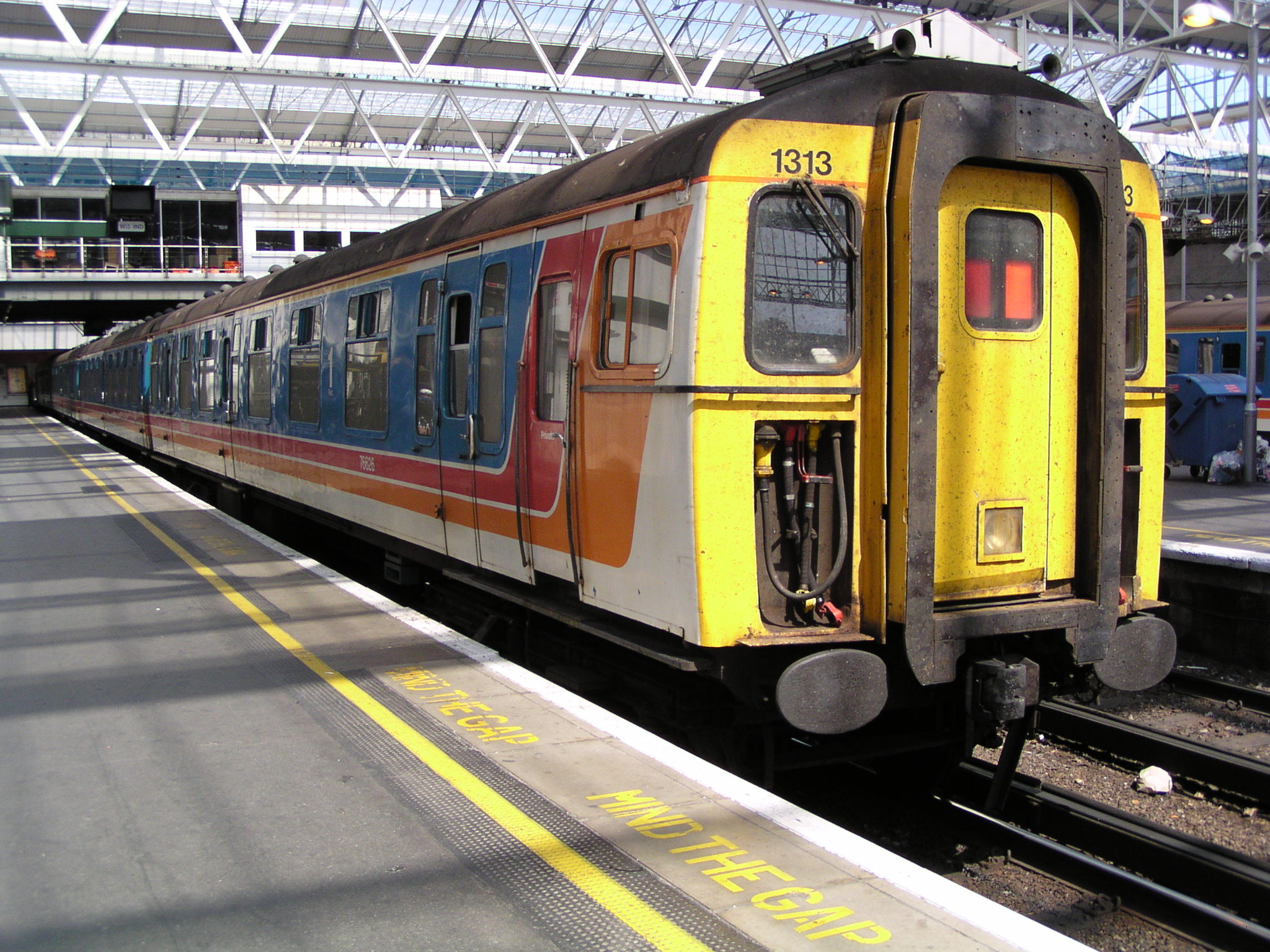
Class 421/5, no. 1313, at London Waterloo in 2003; this is one of 22 Greyhound units that were operated by South West Trains

The numbering of individual vehicles and details of when units were built are shown in the table below:

Vehicle numbering:
Phase	Type	Nos.	Years built	DTCoL (Note: Driving Trailer Composite Open Lavatory.)	MBSO (Note: Motor Brake Second Open.)	TSO (Note: Trailer Second Open.) (*TSORB) (Note: Trailer Second Open Restaurant Buffet.)	DTCoL
1	4-CIG	7301–7336	1964–65	76076–76111	62017–62052	70695–70730	76022–76057
1	4-BIG	7031–7048	1964–65	76112–76129	62053–62070	69301–69318*	76058–76075
2	4-BIG	7049–7058	1970	76561–76570	62277–62286	69330–69339*	76571–76580
2	4-CIG	7337–7366	1970	76581–76610	62287–62316	70967–70996	76611–76640
2	4-CIG	7367–7437	1970–72	76717–76787	62355–62425	71035–71105	76788–76858
2	4-CIG	7438	1972	76859	62430	71106	76860

== Refurbishment ==
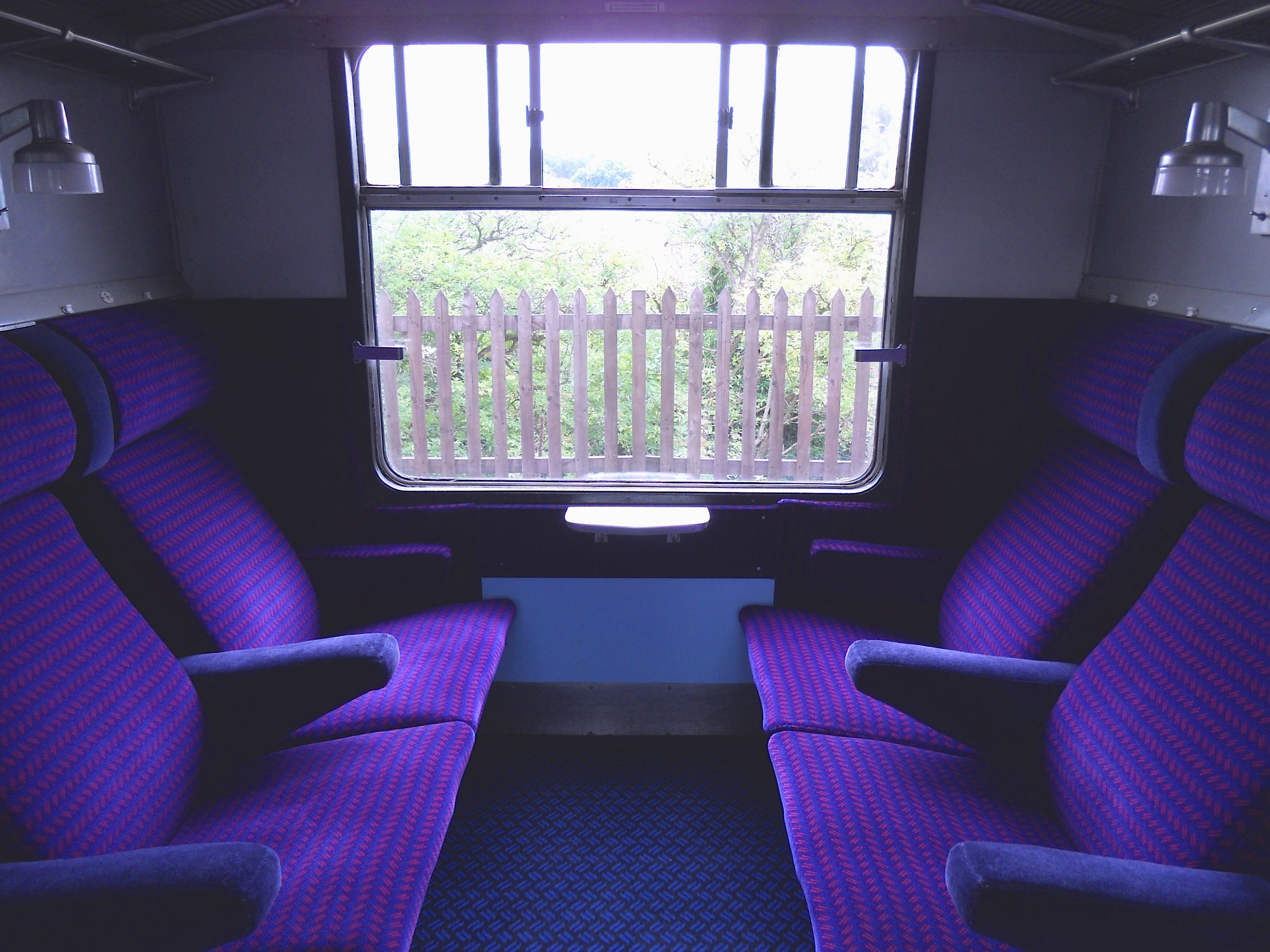
The interior of a first class compartment

The fleet was refurbished between 1986 and 1993.

=== 8-MIG fleet ===
In 1983, two temporary 8-MIGs, given the TOPS classification Class 482 and numbered 2601/02, were formed while the 4-BIG fleet underwent asbestos removal. They were used on the Portsmouth Direct line; therefore, four standard 'Phase 2' 4-CIGs, numbers 7401–04, were reformed with a conventional locomotive-hauled miniature buffet carriage (RMB). Each 8-MIG was formed by marshalling the RMB coach in between two units, one of which was reduced to three carriages, with the removal of the intermediate trailer (TSO). Thus, in effect, each 8-MIG was formed of 4-CIG + RMB + 3-CIG.

The formations of the trains are listed below:

Unit no.	4-CIG					RMB coach	3-CIG			
Unit no.	No.	DTCsoL	MBSO	TSO	DTCsoL	RMB coach	No.	DTCsoL	MBSO	DTCsoL
2601	7401	76751	62389	71069	76822	1872	7402	76752	62390	76823
2602	7403	76753	62391	71071	76804	1873	7404	76754	62392	76825

These units were only used during the summer of 1983, after which enough asbestos-free 4-BIG trains were available. The two 8-MIGs were disbanded and the four 4-CIG was reformed. The 4-CIGs have since been renumbered several times:

Unrefurbished		Facelifted		
74xx series	12xx series	18xx series	8-DIG	18xx series
7401	1201	1868	-	-
7402	1202	1860	-	-
7403	1203	1869	-	-
7404	1204	1875	2001	1802

=== 8-DIG fleet ===
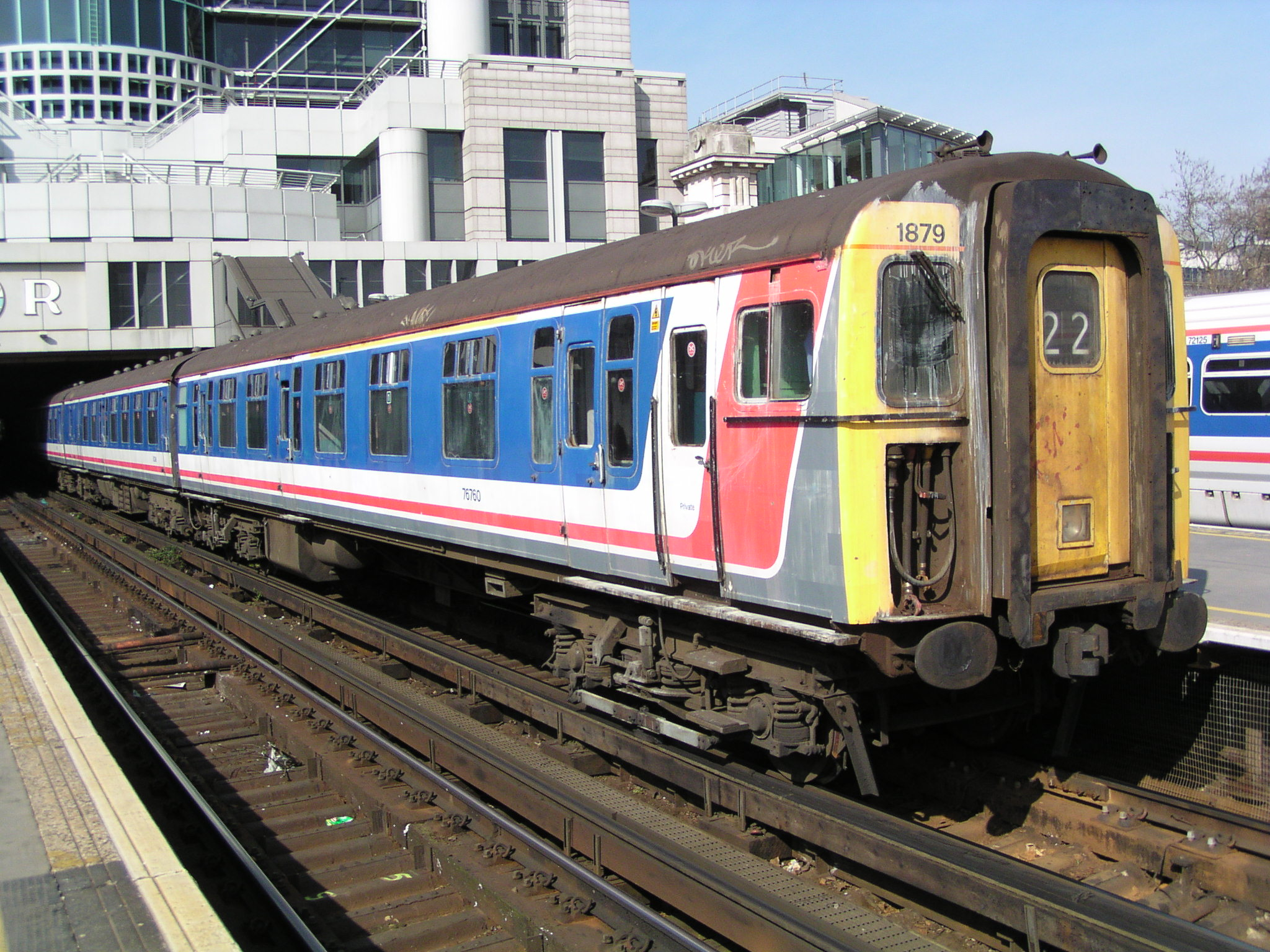
Class 421/4, no. 1879, at Charing Cross in 2003, with a service to Hastings; it was operated by South Eastern Trains and painted in Network SouthEast livery

In 1992, four 8-DIGs, numbered 2001-2004, were formed by semi-permanently coupling a 4-CIG and a 4-BIG; these were dedicated to London Victoria to Brighton express services, which were operated as the Capital–Coast Express. The 8-DIGs were formed from four 'Phase 2' 4-BIGs plus two 'Phase 1' and two 'Phase 2' 4-CIGs. Phase 1' nos. 1901/02, (Note: Recently renumbered from 1715/16.) were fitted with Mk.6 motor bogies. One of the 'Phase 2' 4-CIGs, no. 1875 (formerly 7404), had previously been part of 8-MIG no. 2602. The units were disbanded in 1996, after replacement by dedicated Class 319/2 EMUs. The various 4-CIGs and 4-BIGs were reformed and regained their original numbers, except no. 1875, which was renumbered to 1802.

== Final years of operation ==
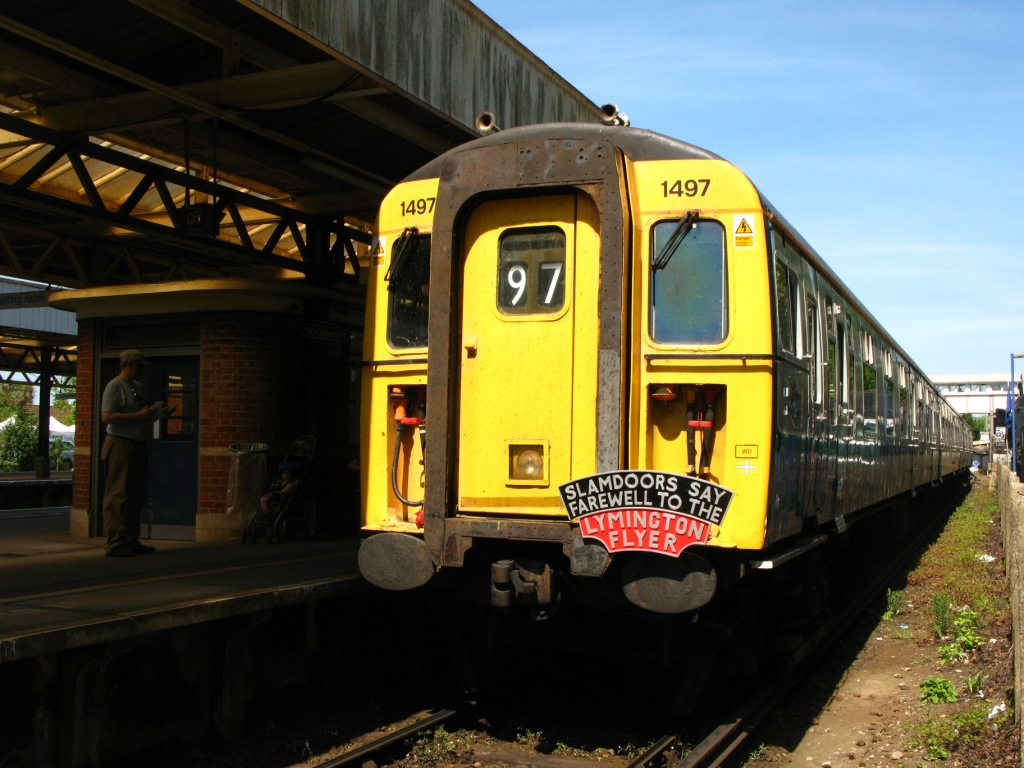
Their last day of operation on the Lymington branch line

Two units had remained in service until 22 May 2010; 3-CIG nos. 1497 and 1498, which were used on the Lymington branch line. These two trains were withdrawn from service on 22 May 2010 and replaced by Class 158 diesel multiple units (DMUs).

Towards the end of their working lives, with the increasing use of newer trains which were equipped with sliding or plug doors, these were known commonly as slam-door trains. No. 1497 was initially preserved at the Mid-Norfolk Railway and later transferred to the Lavender Line and 1498 preserved on the Epping Ongar Railway until it was sold and exported to Ireland. The latter has had an extra carriage added to restore its original 4-CIG formation.

After the privatisation of British Rail in the mid-1990s, the different divisions of British Rail were divided up into different franchises; the three former SR divisions (Note: South Eastern, South Central and South Western.) all operated 4-CIGs.

=== South Eastern Trains ===
South Eastern Trains (SET) operated a small fleet of three 'Phase 1' and 22 'Phase 2' 4-CIGs. The franchise was originally operated by Connex South Eastern.

All but one of the 'Phase 2' trains continued to carry the Network SouthEast livery, which was obsolete by then. No. 1870 was repainted into Connex South Eastern yellow and white. The three 'Phase 1' units were painted in white undercoat livery, since their use was originally only supposed to be short-term; however, despite this, they remained in traffic for seven more years from 1997 to 2004. They were popularly known as Ghosts by rail enthusiasts.

From 2003, these trains started to be withdrawn, having been replaced by the second batch of the new Class 375 Electrostars. The three 'Phase 1' units had gone by mid-2004; the final train was no. 1843, which lingered on for several months longer than its classmates, eventually being withdrawn in mid-November 2004. All of SET's units have been scrapped.

=== South Central / Southern ===
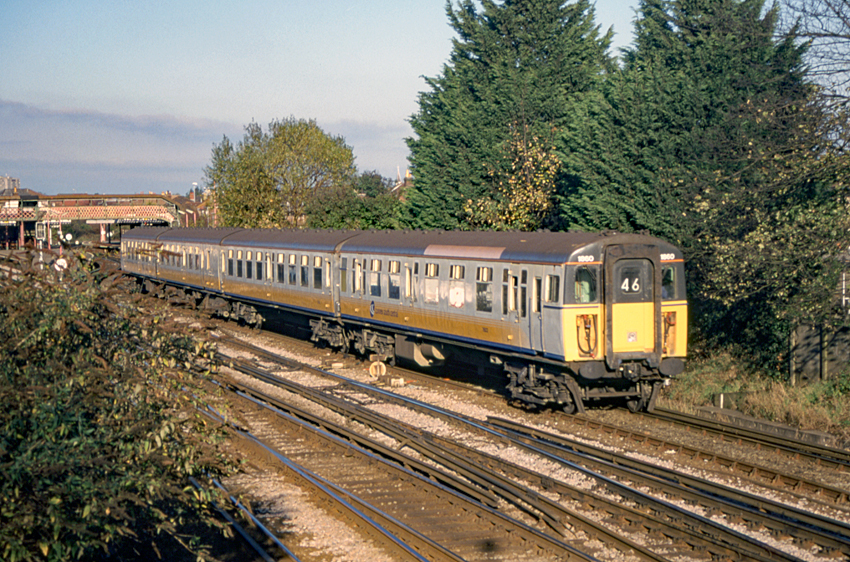
Class 421/4 1860 in Connex South Central livery at St Denys

This division inherited the largest fleet of 4-CIGs. Originally this included all remaining 'Phase 1' units, (Note: Some were later transferred to South Eastern Trains.) the 35 'Phase 2' and the four 8-DIGs. The remaining few 4-BIGs were also used on the former Central division.

The South Central franchise was initially won by Connex South Central, which applied its yellow and white livery to most stock. In 2000, it lost the franchise to the Go-Ahead Group, which operated as South Central; in 2004, this was changed to Southern. Four 'Phase 1' (nos. 1735/38/40, 1908) and eight 'Phase 2' trains (nos. 1854/56-62) received Southern's new green livery.

In 1997, the remaining 4-BIGs were withdrawn; eight were transferred to South West Trains and the remaining eleven trains were heavily rebuilt at Eastleigh railway works, with compartments removed and opened out, with the buffet carriages withdrawn. The modified trains were reclassified as Class 421/7 and were renumbered into the 1401–1411 range; they were also known as 3-COPs, which denoted their intended use, i.e. dedicated to East Coastway and West Coastway services out of Brighton.

Two units received names; a rarity for slam-door EMU stock:

- 1408: Littlehampton Progress 2000
- 1409: Operation Perseus.

In 2004, some trains were augmented to four carriages with the addition of a 'Phase 1' intermediate trailer; they then became 4-COPs.

From 2003, Southern started to replace its slam-door fleet with new Class 377 Electrostars. In general, the 'Phase 1' units were withdrawn first due to their age but, as deliveries of the Electrostars increased, some 'Phase 2s' were also taken out of service. By late 2004, only a handful of 'Phase 1' and 4-COPs remained in service. The final 'Phase 1s'in traffic were nos. 1704/08/11/12/14/17/43 and 1901; no. 1704 was the last to be withdrawn in February 2005. The final 4-COPs, nos. 1404/10/11, were withdrawn in March 2005.

The 'Phase 2' units lasted longer and two, nos. 1805 and 1866, were retained beyond August 2005, when slam-door trains lost all diagrammed work. They lasted until 19 November 2005, when they worked a farewell railtour; following this, they were withdrawn.

=== South West Trains ===
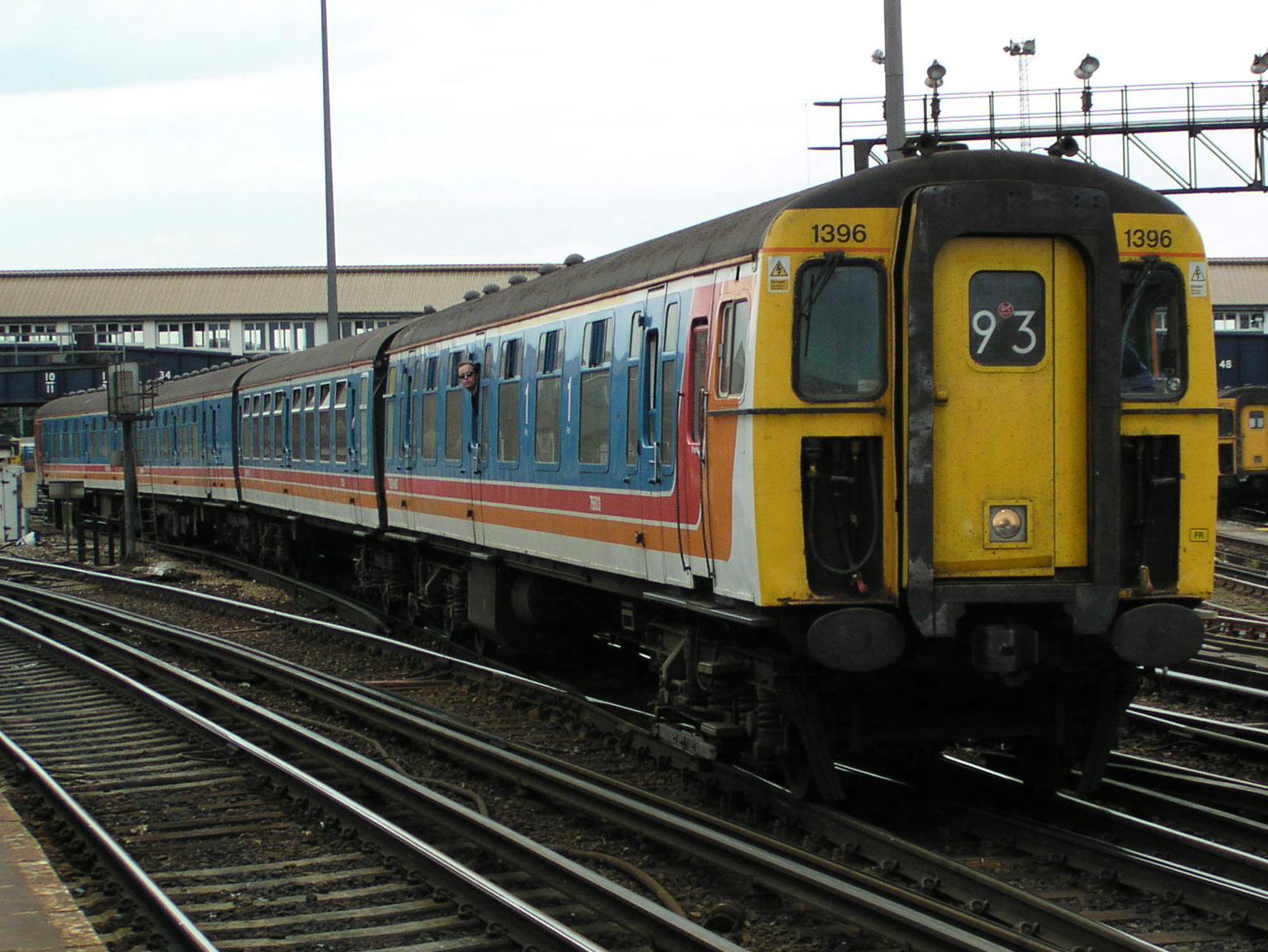
Class 421/8, no. 1396, at Clapham Junction in 2003. This is one of eight Greyhound units that were converted from redundant 4-BIGs for use by SWT. The buffet coach was replaced with a spare 4-CEP trailer vehicle, which is identifiable by its different windows as the second vehicle

South West Trains inherited a small fleet of twelve 'Phase 2' 4-CIGs and the larger fleet of 22 Greyhounds, which had been modified to cut several minutes from journey times on the Portsmouth Direct line. This route's 1 in 80 gradients were achieved by adding a second stage of field weakening to improve performance at higher speeds. (Note: 17% at 54 mph, 30% at 90 mph.)

In 1997, the fleet was augmented with the addition of eight 4-BIGs from Connex South Central; these operated with the counter in the buffet carriages locked out of use. By 1999, these units had been stored, but then eight additional Greyhounds were converted from the redundant 4-BIGs. These were reclassified as Class 421/8 and renumbered in the range 1392–1399. The modifications included the removal of the buffet carriages, which were replaced by spare intermediate trailers from the mechanically-similar Class 411 4-CEPs. Most of these trailers came from 4-CEPs to make 3-CEPs, but a few came from withdrawn units. These trailers were immediately recognisable since, although they had the same body profile as the rest of the unit, the windows were different and they had premium InterCity70 seating. The buffet carriages were withdrawn, although many were saved for preservation.

In December 2004, no. 1394 was reduced to three-cars with the removal of its CEP trailer; it was reclassified as Class 421/7, renumbered 1499 and dedicated to the Lymington branch line service, where it replaced the previous incumbent no. 1198.

Withdrawals started in mid-2004, when many new Class 444 and 450 Desiro trains became available for service. By the end of 2004, just a handful of units remained in traffic; the final few were withdrawn in May 2005, with the last in traffic being 1304/09/12/16, 1392/95/96/97/98, 1499 and 1881/90. The final slam-door service ran on 26 May from London Waterloo to Bournemouth using nose. 1396, 1398 and 4-VEP 3536. Following withdrawal, nos. 1304 and 1881, were transferred to warm storage for use by Southern if required. Most others were sent for scrap, with the exception of nos. 1392 and 1499.

Services on the Lymington branch line were operated as a heritage operation using one of two refurbished 3-CIGs, nos. 1497 and 1498; they were launched into service on 12 May 2005, having been repainted into heritage liveries: 1497 in blue and grey, and 1498 in the green that they carried when built. However, in May 2010, the new timetable changes saw them replaced for more modern stock to save maintenance on a small non-standard fleet. As stated in the relevant timetable: "The slam door trains will be remembered with affection as they pass into history." The change took place on 22 May 2010 and the units were replaced by a Class 158 on weekdays and a Class 450 at weekends. These two Class 421s have both been preserved, due to their historic significance.

== Accidents and incidents ==
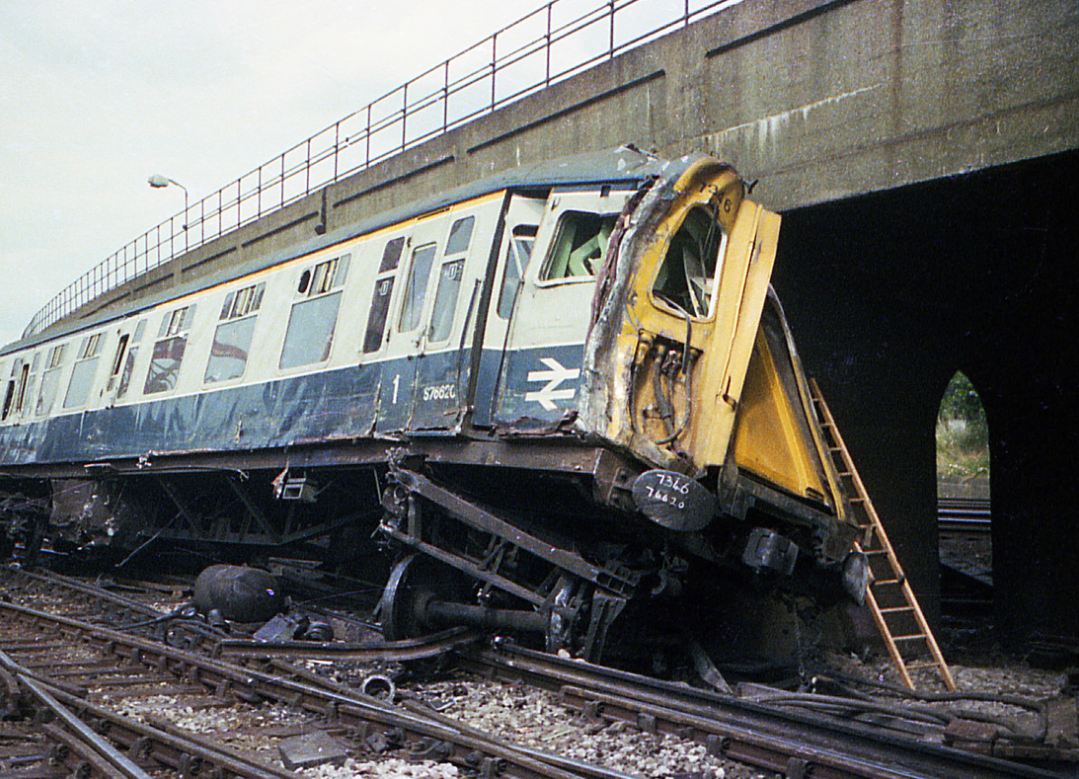
4-CIG 7346 after running away at Wimbledon in 1974

- On 15 December 1971, a Cardiff Central to Portsmouth Harbour train hauled by a Class 35 Hymek diesel locomotive no. D7013 collided with no. 7303 on the high level section of Portsmouth and Southsea. Sixteen passengers and railway staff were injured
- In summer 1974, (Note: Date unknown.) 7346 ran away near to Wimbledon Park and hit a flyover, causing extensive damage to the cab of vehicle 76620.
- On 26 January 1985, 7395 formed a train with Class 423 4-VEPs 7754 and 7703 which was halted by a landslip near Popham, Hampshire, and was run into by Class 33 locomotive no. 33 104; this was due to the train crew failing to protect the stranded train. Twelve people were injured and the locomotive was written off.
- On 6 November 1985, no. 7390 collided with 4-VEP 7724 at Copyhold Junction, near Haywards Heath, West Sussex, due to poor rail conditions and a loss of braking. Forty people were injured.
- On 4 March 1989, nos. 1280 and 1295 were involved in the Purley rail crash when the train overran a signal and collided with another, formed of 4-VEP 3441, at Purley, in Surrey. Five people were killed and eight were injured.
- On 6 April 1989, 1822 was derailed at Wimbledon whilst working a London Waterloo to Southampton service. There were no injuries.
- On 1 August 1990, Class 119 DMU L576 collided with a passenger train comprising 4-VEPs 3508 & 3504, and 4-CIG 1304 at Reading, due to overrunning signals. Forty people were injured.
- On 29 August 1990, 1221 was derailed at Ash Vale Junction whilst operating a Guildford to Ascot service.

== Withdrawal ==
=== Departmental service ===
Following withdrawal from passenger service, several vehicles have seen further use in departmental service:

- 3-COP no. 1401 was employed as depot shunter at Ashford Chart Leacon depot. However, it was made redundant when Chart Leacon stopped overhauls of slam-door stock and was sent for scrap in July 2005.
- MBS 62356 (formerly 1850) was converted into an ultrasonic test train vehicle for use by Network Rail; it was renumbered 999606.
- The rest of 1850, namely DTC 76629, TS 71036 and DTC 76789, were retained by Network Rail to provide spares for 999606, but have now been scrapped by C.F. Booth in Rotherham.
- One vehicle, no. 76112 from 'Phase 1' 4-CIG no. 1749, was rebuilt as the Class 424 Networker Classic prototype in 1997. It was displayed to the public at London Victoria, paired with a legacy driving trailer 76747 from 4-BIG 2256 as a comparator. The project was shelved and the vehicle was scrapped in early 2012.
- DTCSoL vehicles 76765 and 76836 (from 1882) plus 76775 and 76846 (from 1890) were released by HSBC Rail from Shoeburyness for parts stripping at the Railway Technical Centre (RTC) in Derby, after which they went to C.F. Booth for scrapping.

=== Preservation ===
Two complete trains have been preserved, along with several buffet cars from 4-BIGs. The full list is shown below, with complete units highlighted: (Note: No Greyhounds, 8-MIGs or 8-DIGs survive.)

- 'Phase 1' 1753 has been preserved by the Network SouthEast Railway Society and is stored at Nemesis Rail, Burton-upon-Trent
- 'Phase 2' 1497 has been preserved on the Lavender Line.

Former preserved CIGs, all 'Phase 2', included:

- 1304, later scrapped by the Brighton Belle Preservation Trust
- 1392, scrapped by the Brighton Belle Preservation Trust; its MBSO, in an extremely stripped condition, survives as a shell)
- 1393, later scrapped by the Great Central Railway; its MBSO is in use with Network Rail
- 1399, partially component recovered by owner in 2016 to provide spares float for 4-VOP 3905 and other projects; it was used in filming of 'Last Passenger'
- 1498, exported to Ireland for use as glamping accommodation.
- 1499, later scrapped by the Dean Forest Railway
- 1881, later scrapped by the Brighton Belle Preservation Trust; one DTS remains at Barrow Hill Roundhouse
- 1884, later scrapped by the Brighton Belle Preservation Trust.

Number (current in bold)					Type	Phase	DTC soL	MBSO	TSO (*TSRB)	DTC soL	Livery	Location	Notes
7032	2101	**2251**	-	-	4-BIG	1	-	-	69302*	-	Network SouthEast	Neath Abbey Business Park	Out of use since 2022
7034	2110	**2260**	-	-	4-BIG	1	-	-	69304*	-	South West Trains	Northamptonshire Ironstone Railway Trust	Stripped
**7036**	2104	2254	2002	-	4-BIG	1	-	-	69306*	-	BR(S) green	Spa Valley Railway	Used as a static café at Tunbridge Wells West
**7040**	2105	2255	2003	-	4-BIG	1	-	-	69310*	-	BR(S) green	Dartmoor Railway	-
**7046**	2108	2258	-	-	4-BIG	1	-	-	69316*	-	BR(S) green	Riccarton Junction	Waverley Route heritage centre
**7048**	2109	2259	2004	-	4-BIG		-	-	69318*	-	BR(S) green	Mid Norfolk Railway	-
7051	**2203**	-	-	-	4-BIG	2	-	-	69332*	-	BR(S) green	Swanage Railway	To be used as part of a 4-TC set
7054	2206	-	-	-	4-BIG	2	-	-	69338*	-	Yellow and green	Bahrain	Exported to Bahrain
7053	**2205**	-	-	-	4-BIG	2	-	-	69339*	-	BR(S) green	Nemesis Rail - Burton-on-Trent, with 1753	-
**7055**	2207	2112	2262	2001	4-BIG	2	-	-	69333*	-	BR(S) Green	Lavender Line	-
7057	**2209**	-	-	-	4-BIG	2	-	-	69335*	-	LNER green and cream	Wensleydale Railway	-
**7058**	2210	-	-	-	4-BIG	2	-	-	69337*	-	BR green	Hastings Diesels	Operates with preserved Class 201 no. 1001
7327	1127	**1753**	-	-	4-CIG	1	76102	62043	70721	76048	Connex	At Finmere until January 2020	Privately owned by Mr N.D. Bird, supported by the NSE Railway Society, and named Chris Green after the managing director of Network SouthEast; undergoing restoration work at Nemesis Rail, Burton-on-Trent
7373	-	1819	**1306**	-	4-CIG	2	-	-	71041	-	Green	At Hever, Kent	
7337	-	-	-	-	4-CIG	2	-	62287	-	-	Network Rail yellow	Derby RTC	Now in Network Rail service, as an ultrasonic test coach.
7376	1276	2251	1394	**1499**	4-CIG	2	-	62364	-	-	South West Trains	Barrow Hill Roundhouse	
7396	1295	2258	**1393**	-	4-CIG	2	-	62384	-	-	Network Rail yellow	Derby RTC	Now in Network Rail service, as an ultrasonic test coach
7397	1297	2256	**1399**	-	4-CIG	2	76747	-	-	-	BR Green	East Kent Railway	
7397	1297	2256	**1399**	-	4-CIG	2	-	62385	-	-	South West Trains	East Kent Railway	
7412	1212	1881	-	-	3-CIG	2	76762	-	-	-		Barrow Hill Roundhouse	
7414	1214	1883	**1497**	-	4-CIG	2	76764	62402	-	76835	BR Blue/Grey	Lavender Line	Formerly on the Lymington branch line and is now preserved at the Lavender Line being restored.
7417	1217	**1884**	-	-	4-CIG	2	-	-	71085	-	White / Art Design	Morden Wharf, Greenwich	Now out of use, in store
7423	1223	1888	**1498**	-	3-CIG	2	76773	62411	-	76844	BR Green	County Sligo, Ireland	Formerly on the Lymington branch line, later on the Epping Ongar Railway until mid-2013; now used at a camping site in Ireland

== Diagrams ==
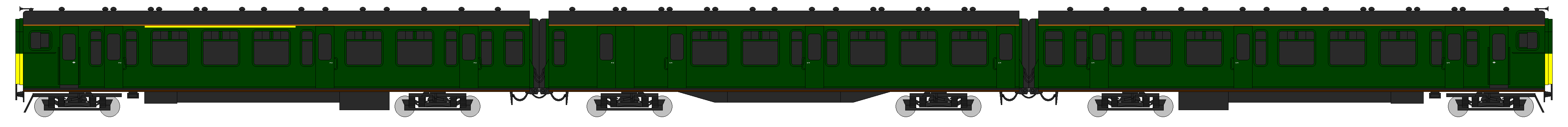

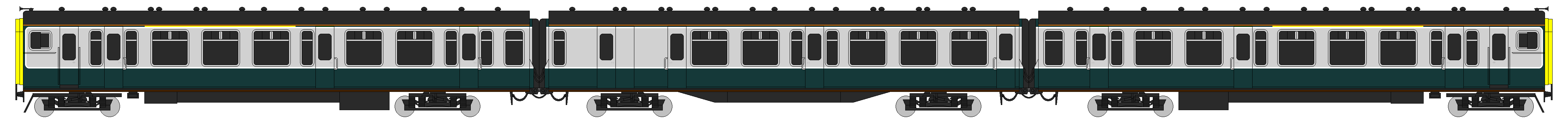
