= Network SouthEast =

Passenger sector of British Rail (1982–1994)

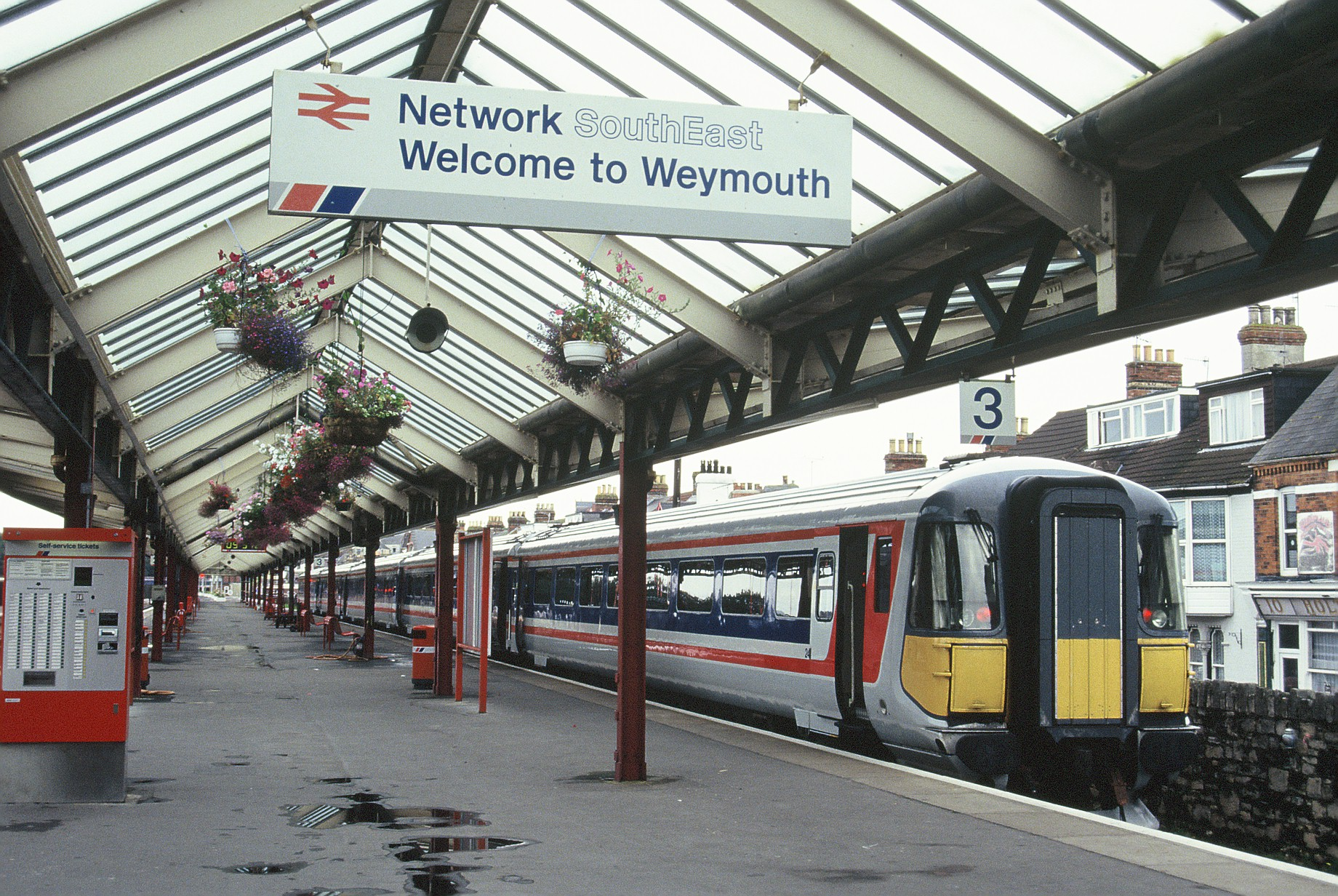
- A Class 442 at Weymouth in 1992

Overview
- Main regions: London, South East
- Other regions: East of England, South West, Thames Valley
- Fleet: Carriages: 6,700 (1986)
- Stations called at: 930 (1986)
- Parent company: British Rail
- Headquarters: London
- Dates of operation: 1986–1994
- Successors: M40 Trains, Thames Trains, Connex South Eastern, South West Trains, Great Western Trains, Connex South Central, Anglia Railways, First Great Eastern, Thameslink, North London Railways, LTS Rail, West Anglia Great Northern

Network SouthEast (NSE) was one of the three passenger sectors of British Rail created in 1982. NSE mainly operated commuter rail trains within Greater London and inter-urban services in densely populated South East England, although the network went as far west as Exeter and also covered the inner East of England. Before 1986, the sector was originally known as London & South Eastern. During the privatisation of British Rail, it was gradually divided into a number of franchises.

== History ==
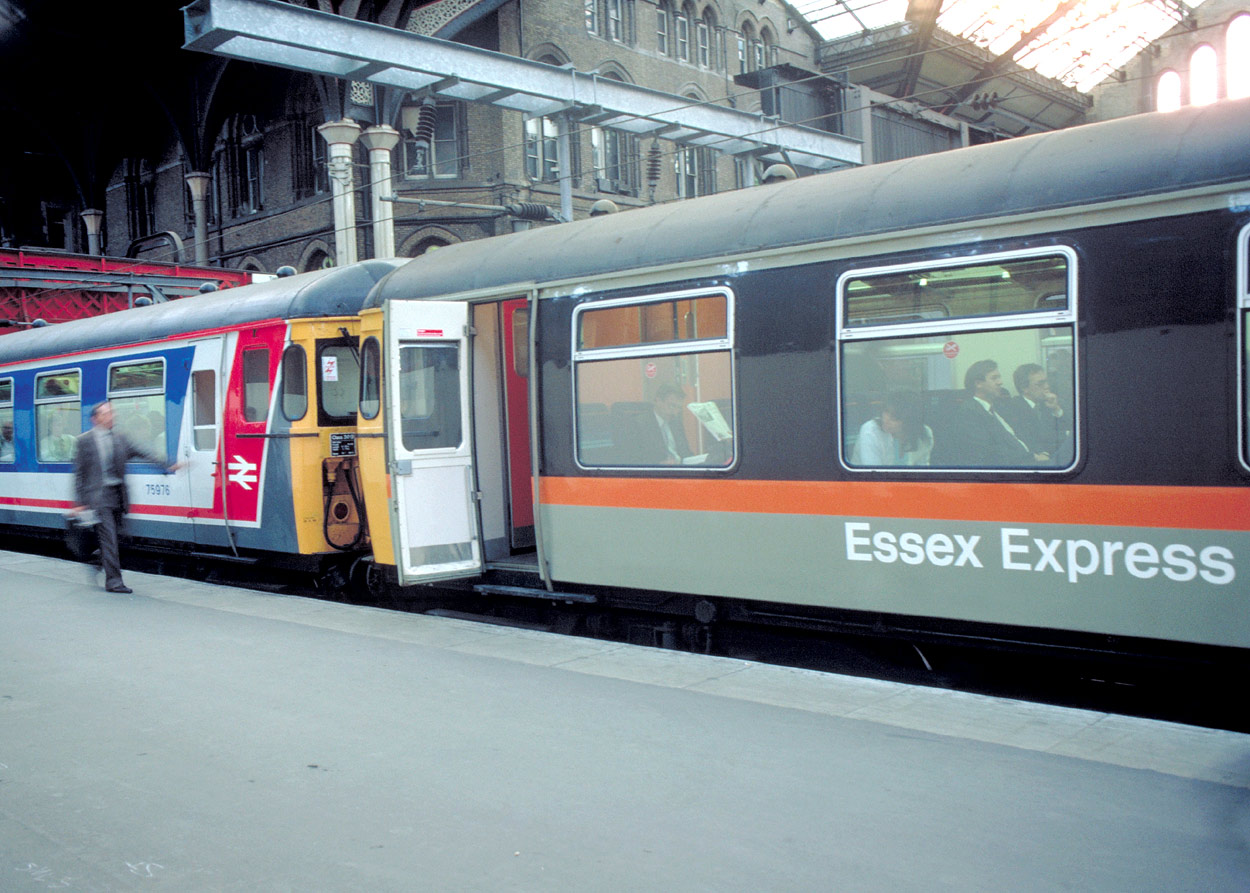
Two Class 309 (AM9) units; one in NSE livery, the other in Jaffa Cake livery

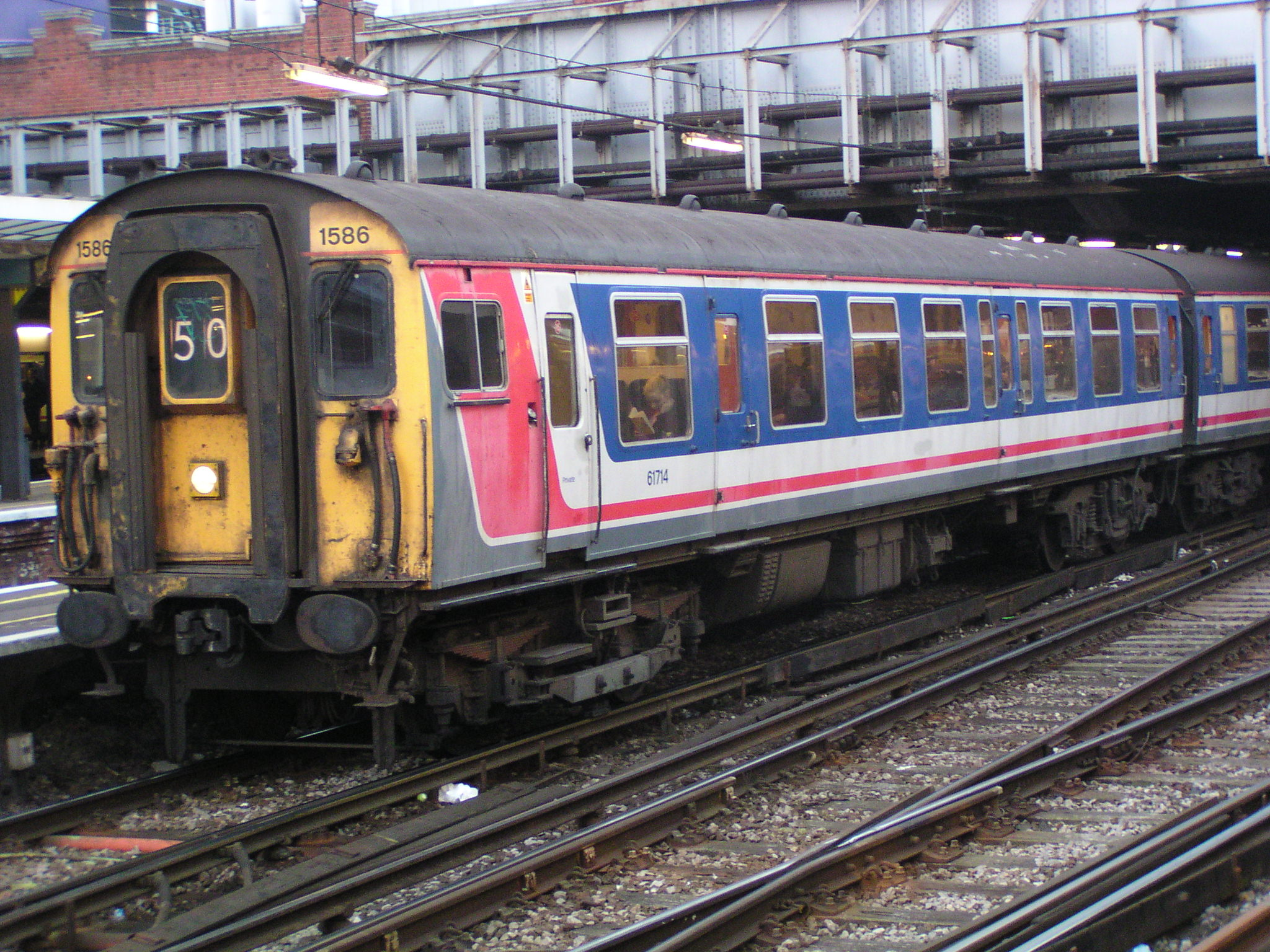
Class 411 (4CEP) in modified NSE livery with rounded corners

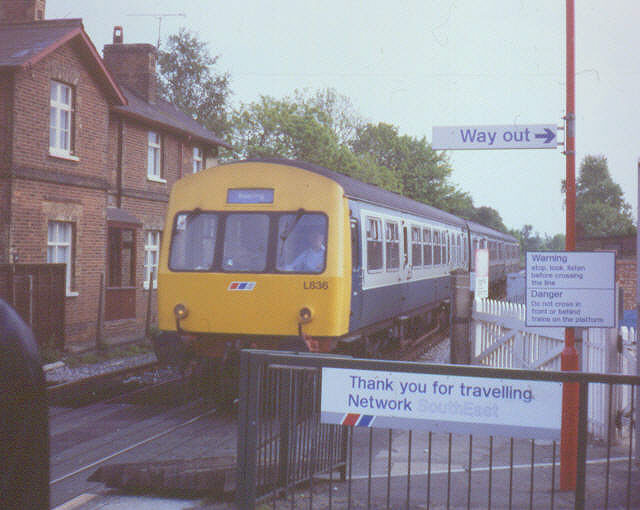
Transitional scene from BR Blue (the train) to NSE (the signage, train label) at Farnborough North station

Before the sectorisation of British Rail (BR) in 1982 the system was split into largely autonomous regional operations: those operating around London were the London Midland Region, Southern Region, Western Region, and Eastern Region. Sectorisation of BR changed this setup by organising by the traffic type: commuter services in the south-east of England, long-distance intercity services, local services in the UK regions, parcels and freight. The aim was to introduce greater budgetary efficiency and managerial accountability by building a more market-focused and responsive business, rather than privatising BR completely. It was expected that the London and South East sector would cover most of its operating costs from revenues, in contrast to heavily subsidised rural services.

Upon sectorisation, the London & South Eastern sector took over responsibility for passenger services in the south-east of England, working with the existing BR business units of Regions and Functions to deliver the overall service. Day-to-day operation, staffing and timetabling continued to be delivered by the Regions – and the sector came into existence with barely thirty staff based at Waterloo.

On 10 June 1986, L&SE was relaunched as Network SouthEast, along with a new red, white and blue livery. The relaunch was intended to be more than a superficial rebranding and was underpinned by considerable investment in the presentation of stations and trains, as well as efforts to improve service standards. This approach was largely brought about by a new director, Chris Green, who had presided over a similar transformation and rebranding of ScotRail. According to Green, the new name was top of a list of two hundred provided by the advertising agency J Walter Thompson, who agreed to act as marketing consultants on condition that the advertising was part of a wider change of image.

The relaunch was marked by the first 'Network Day', on 21 June 1986. For £3 passengers could travel anywhere within the Network. 200 extra services were provided and over 200,000 passengers took advantage of the offer. There was a second Network Day on 13 September, and others in subsequent years, though passengers for these required a Network Card to qualify.

Although NSE did not originally own or maintain infrastructure, it exercised control over almost all carrier core functions. NSE set its own goals and service standards in consultation with BR, and created its own management structure and oversight. BR allowed NSE to decide about scheduling, marketing, infrastructure enhancements, and rolling stock specifications on NSE-assigned lines and services.

In April 1990, British Rail Chairman Bob Reid announced that sectorisation would be made complete, with regions disbanded by 1991–92 and the individual sectors becoming directly responsible for all operations other than a few core long-term planning and standards functions. Network SouthEast thus went from a business unit of around 300 staff to a major business operation with 38,000 staff and a £4.7 billion asset value – large enough to be ranked as the 15th-biggest business in the UK.

Network SouthEast, like each other sector, was given primary responsibility for various assets (rolling stock, tracks, stations), and control resided with the primary user. Other sectors could negotiate access rights and rent facilities, using their own resources. NSE was able to exert much greater control and accountability over both its operating budget and service quality than BR could under its Regions. Relations were generally good between NSE and other sectors, although operating pressures sometimes forced staff to use equipment and assets belonging to other sectors to meet immediate needs.

On 1 April 1994, Network SouthEast was disbanded with its operations transferred to train operating units ready for privatisation.

== Network Railcard ==
Although NSE ceased to exist in 1994, the grouping of services that it defined before privatisation remain grouped by the Network Railcard, which can be bought for £35 and which offers a 34% discount for adults and 60% discount for accompanying children after 10:00 on weekdays and all day at weekends (subject to a minimum weekday fare of £13). Holders of annual season tickets for journeys within the Network area, including on London Underground, are issued with a "Gold Card" which gives them similar privileges to the Network Railcard.

== Subdivisions ==
In 1986, Network SouthEast had the following "sub-sectors":

- Central
- East
- North
- SouthEast
- SouthWest
- West

By the end of 1992 these had been reorganised into nine "profit centres":

- Great Eastern
- London Tilbury & Southend
- North
- South Central
- South East
- South West
- Thames & Chiltern
- Thameslink
- West Anglia/Great Northern

== Modernisation ==
Soon after conception, Network SouthEast started to modernise parts of the network, which had become run down after years of under-investment. The most extreme example was the Chiltern Lines.

=== Chiltern Lines ===
The Chiltern Line ran on two railway lines (Chiltern Main Line and London to Aylesbury Line) from London Marylebone to Aylesbury and Banbury. These lines were former GWR and GCR intercity lines to Wolverhampton and Nottingham respectively. After the Beeching Axe in the 1960s, these lines became seriously run down with a lack of investment and a reduction of services.

By the late 1980s, the 25-year-old Class 115s needed replacement; the lines had low speed limits and were still controlled by semaphore signalling from the early 1900s; and Marylebone was served only by infrequent local trains to and from High Wycombe and Aylesbury.

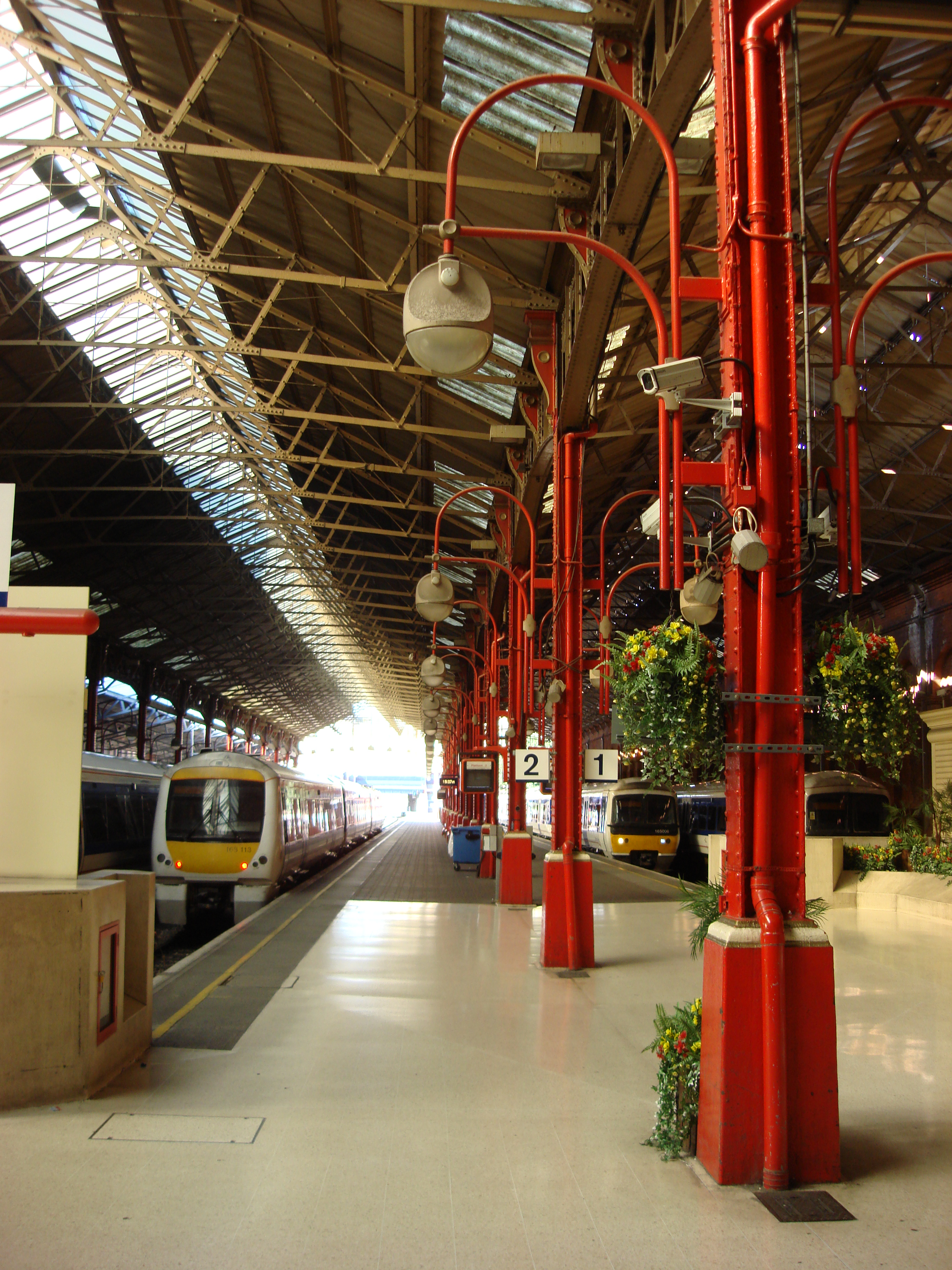
Marylebone still with the red NSE livery for stations, around 30 years later in 2015. Marylebone was one of the stations given a facelift in the late 1980s.

Numerous plans for the lines were proposed. One serious plan was to close the line between Marylebone and South Ruislip/Harrow-on-the-Hill, and convert Marylebone into a coach station. Metropolitan line trains would be extended to Aylesbury, BR services from Aylesbury would be routed to London Paddington via High Wycombe, and the line north of Princes Risborough would close. However, this did not happen as Baker Street and London Paddington would not have been able to cope with the extra trains and passengers.

What did happen was total route modernisation. This was an ambitious plan to bring the lines into the modern era of rail travel. Class 115s were replaced by new Class 165s. Semaphore signals were replaced by standard colour light signals and Automatic Train Protection (ATP) was fitted on the line and trains. Speed limits were increased to 75 mph (only 75 due to running on London Underground track between Harrow and Amersham), all remaining fast loops at stations were removed and the line between Bicester North and Aynho Junction was singled. Stations were refurbished and even reconstructed (£10 million spent on stations alone), and signal boxes and the freight depots/sidings were demolished. Regular services to Banbury, and a few specials to Birmingham were introduced and a new maintenance depot was built at Aylesbury. This was a massive undertaking and work began in 1988 and by 1992, the route had been completely modernised, demand for the service had grown considerably and the route had become profitable.

Since modernisation the route has seen further improvements (see Chiltern Main Line).

Electrification was considered but was deemed to be too expensive as the Thames Line sector would then have to be electrified as well. Another reason electrification did not take place was that some part of the line ran on London Underground tracks, which were electrified as 4-rail 660 V DC, while British Rail preferred 25 kV AC overhead traction for lines north of London.

Success of the modernisation implemented by NSE has made it possible for the Chiltern Main Line to compete with the West Coast Main Line between London and Birmingham, and there are now plans to increase speeds and quadruple sections of the line, returning the line to the state it was before the Beeching Axe.

=== New trains ===
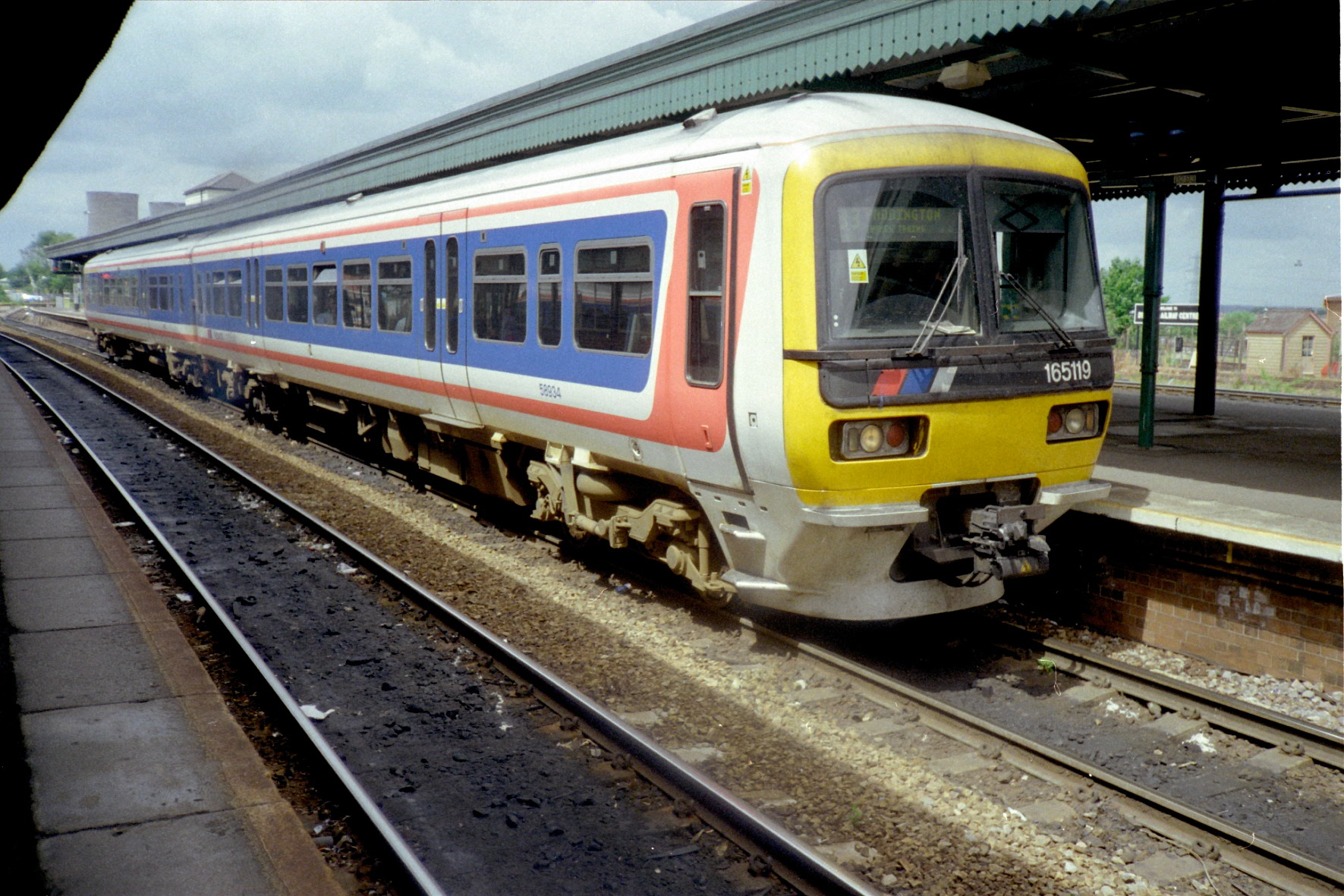
The later style of the Network SouthEast livery

Network SouthEast started a programme of replacing old rolling stock up to privatisation.

- Chiltern – 165
- Great Eastern – 321
- Great Northern – 365
- Island Line – 483 (ex London Underground 1938 Stock)
- Kent Link – 465, 466
- North Downs – 165, 166
- Northampton Line – 321
- Solent and Wessex – 442
- South London Lines – 456
- Thames – 165, 166
- Thameslink – 319
- Waterloo & City – 482 (now London Underground 1992 Stock)
- West Anglia – 315, 317, 322
- West of England – 159

== Privatisation ==
On 1 April 1994, as part of the privatisation of British Rail, Network SouthEast was divided up into train operating units which would later become passenger franchises:

Train operating unit	Route(s)	Original franchisee	Franchise start date
London, Tilbury and Southend	London, Tilbury and Southend line	LTS Rail	26 May 1996
Chiltern	Chiltern Main Line, London to Aylesbury Line, Princes Risborough to Aylesbury Line, Leamington to Stratford Line, Oxford to Bicester Line	M40 Trains	21 July 1996
Great Eastern	Great Eastern	First Great Eastern	5 January 1997
Thames Trains	Thames, North Downs (Gatwick/Redhill–Dorking/Guildford/Reading section)	Thames Trains	13 October 1996
Island Line	Island Line, Isle of Wight	Island Line	13 October 1996
North London Railways	Northampton Line, North London Line	North London Railways	2 March 1997
South Eastern	Kent Coast, Kent Link, North Downs (Tonbridge–Redhill section)	Connex South Eastern	13 October 1996
Network SouthCentral	South London Line, Sussex Coast Line	Connex South Central	26 May 1996
Thameslink	Thameslink (route)	Thameslink	2 March 1997
West Anglia Great Northern	West Anglia Main Line, Northern City Line, Hertford Loop line, Cambridge line, Fen Line, East Coast Main Line	West Anglia Great Northern	5 January 1997
South Western	Solent & Wessex Line, South West Main Line, West of England Line	South West Trains	4 February 1996

One element of NSE that remained in public ownership was the Waterloo & City Line; too small to be operated as a self-contained franchise, it was not incorporated with the rest of NSE services from Waterloo into the South West Trains operation, and was instead transferred to London Underground.

== Legacy ==
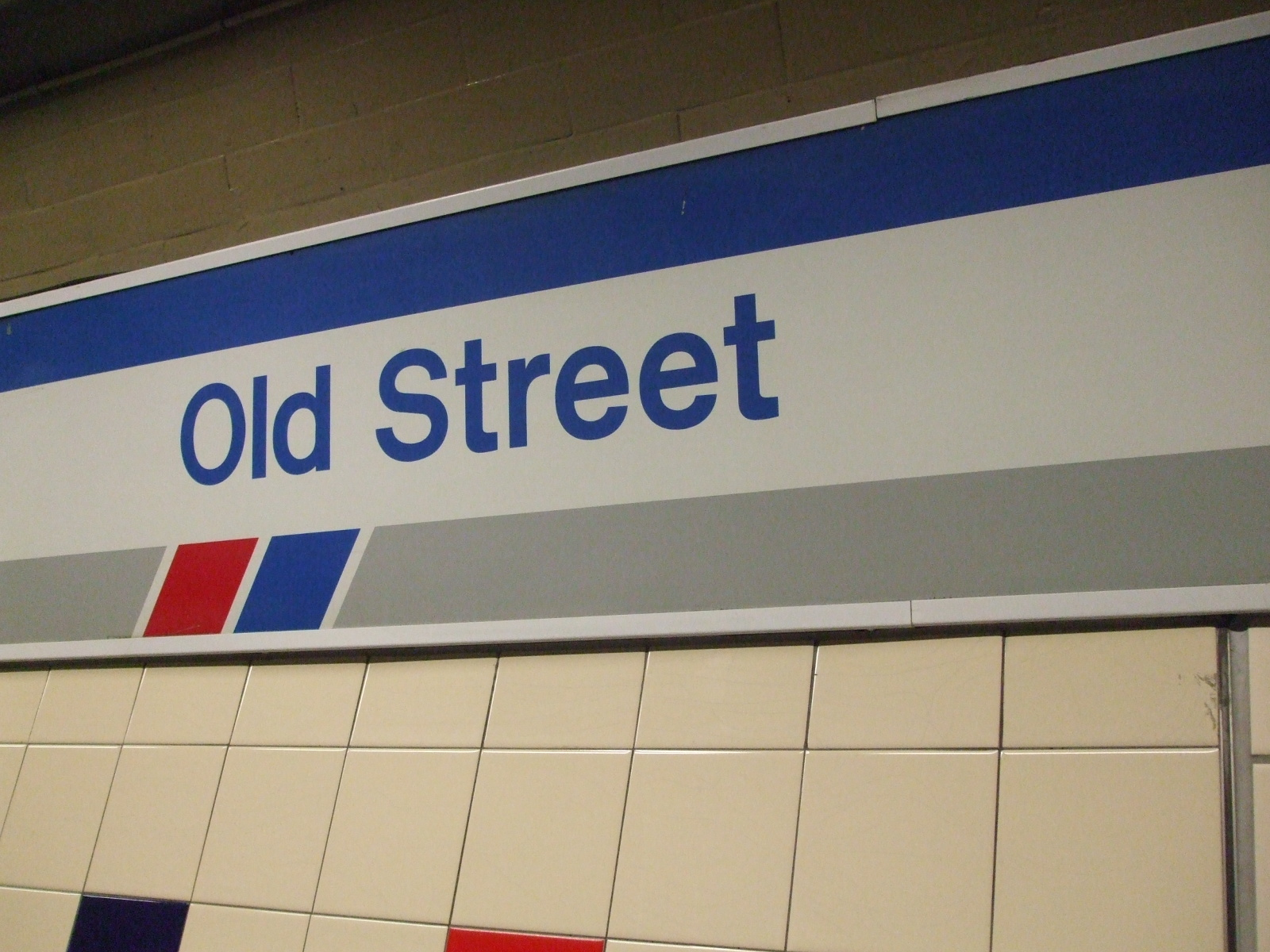
NSE-era signage at Old Street station in September 2008

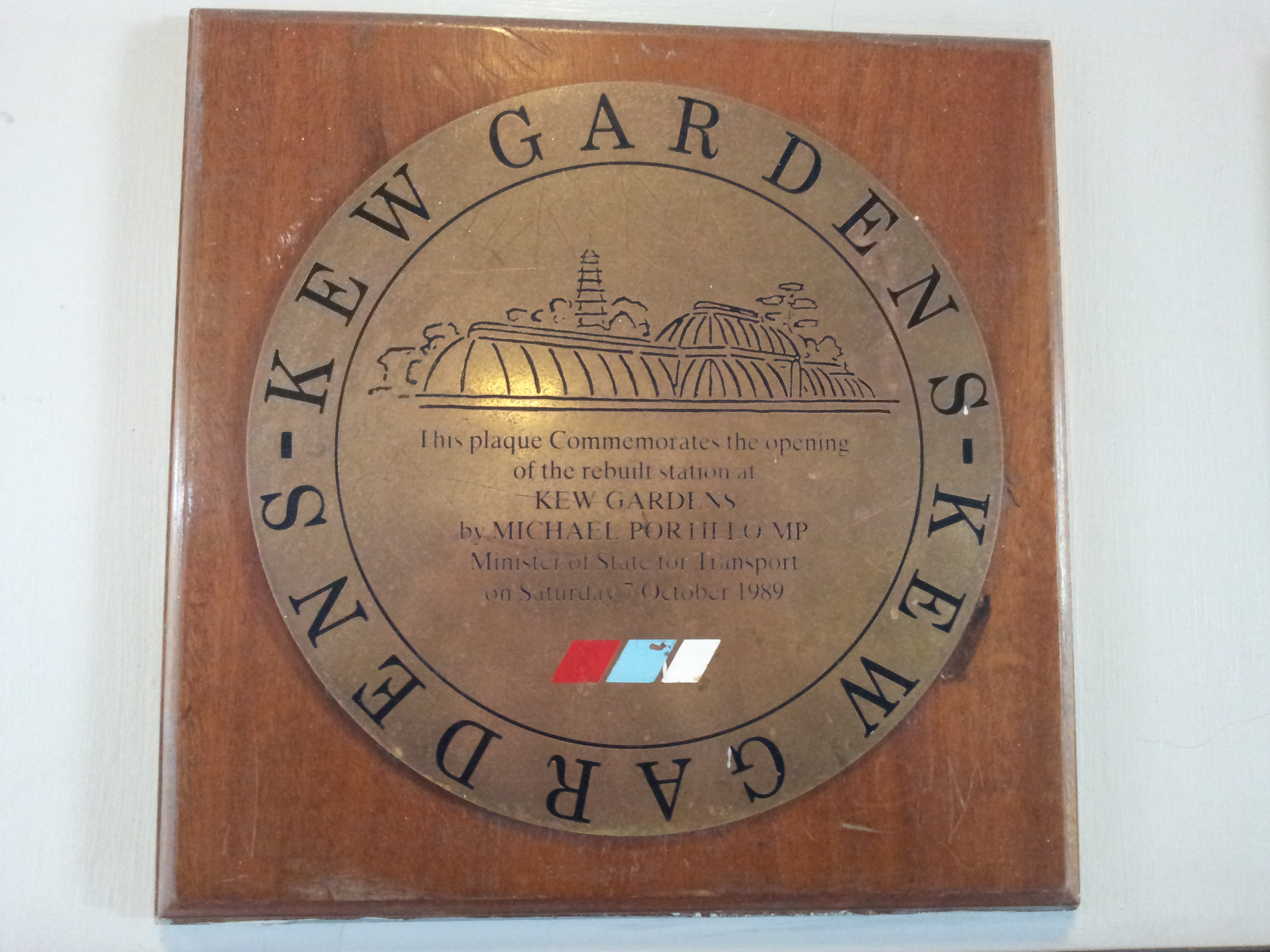
NSE's logo in a plaque at Kew Gardens station

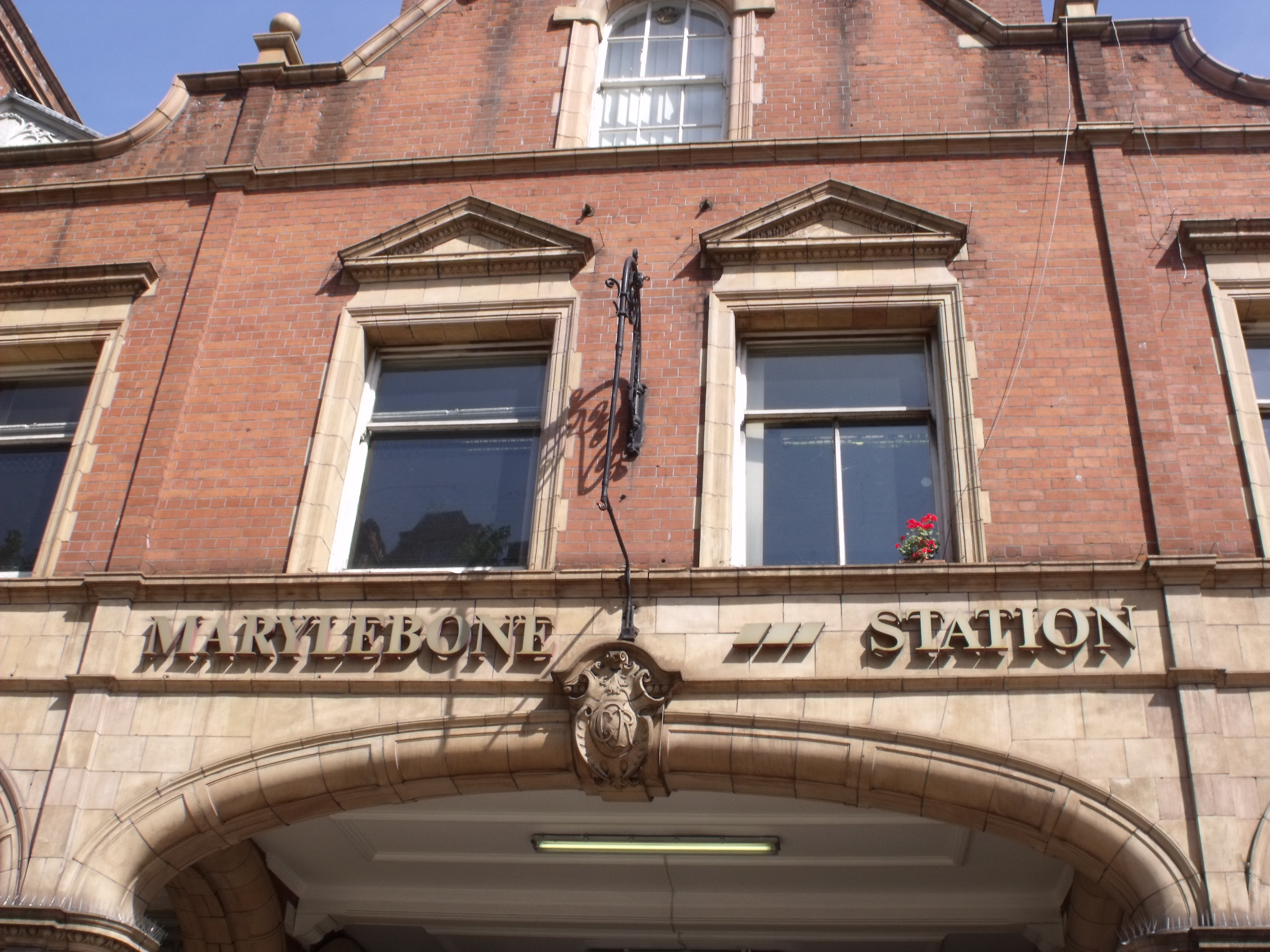
NSE's logo in relief over the main entrance to London Marylebone station

Although NSE ceased to exist in 1994, its logos, livery and signage would linger well into the following decades. Southeastern, Southern and First Capital Connect trains continued to run in NSE livery until as late as 2007.

Underground stations on the Moorgate branch of the Great Northern route (Highbury & Islington, Essex Road, Old Street and Moorgate) used to have the NSE era colour schemes after going through 3 privatised operators (WAGN, First Capital Connect and Great Northern) until late-2018.

NSE signage and logos can be found across the Island Line, Isle of Wight, with particularly well-maintained examples existing at the Ryde Pier Head and Shanklin ticket offices. Kew Gardens station in London still has the NSE logo on a plaque in the booking hall marking the station's reopening by Michael Portillo in 1989. Marylebone station, also in London, was refurbished by NSE in the 1980s and still has the company's logo in the form of three parallelograms in relief over the main entrance.

The last train still in NSE livery was withdrawn on 15 September 2007 when 465193 was sent for revinyling.

In 2002, the Network SouthEast Railway Society was formed to keep the memories of NSE alive by re-promoting through merchandise that they make to raise money for their 4-CIG EMU No.1753 which was named 'Chris Green' at the NSE 30 event at Finmere, Oxfordshire by the ex-NSE boss himself. On 28 August 2015, the Network SouthEast Railway Society obtained the trademark of Network SouthEast's brandname, logo and typeface. The group wanted to obtain the trademark to help Network SouthEast's name and legacy live on following its demise and educate about NSE.

In 2017, the Railway Heritage Trust collaborated with train operator Govia Thameslink Railway to recreate the Network SouthEast image at Downham Market station as a commemorative measure. The station has been equipped with paintwork and signage that mimic the Network SouthEast branding of the late 1980s.

Remnants of NSE can also still be seen within the fare system. So-called "boundary zone" fares for example, which allow for cheaper tickets in conjunction with a London area travelcard, are generally only available to destinations within the former NSE area.

In 2025, as part of the Railway 200 event taking part across the whole of UK rail to celebrate 200 years of railways in Britain, unit 465908 was repainted in a Network SouthEast inspired livery (with PRM compliance) to promote the heritage of the former company. The unit is named after Chris Green, the former manager of Network SouthEast.
