= Connex South Central =

Train operating company in Southern England

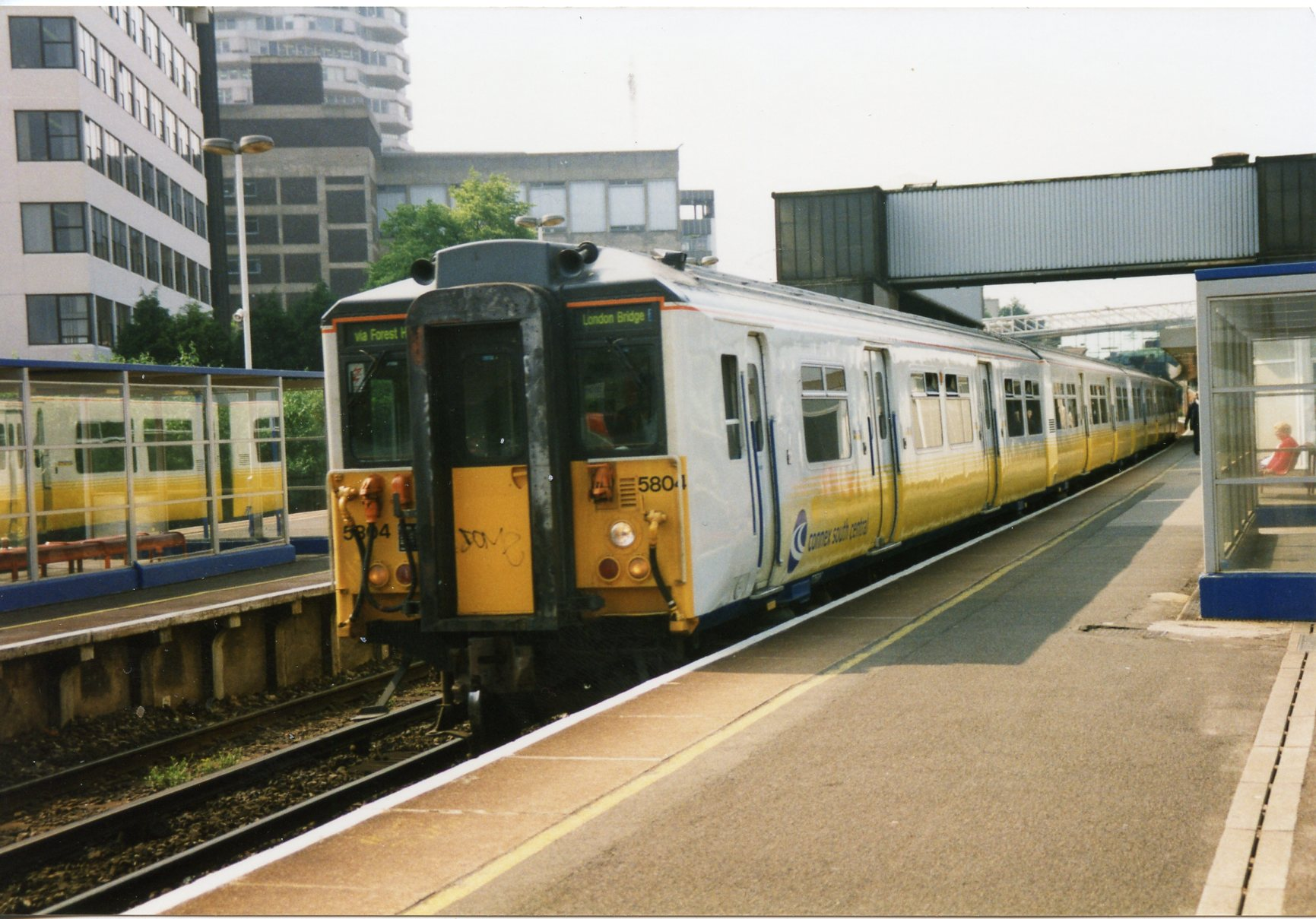
- A Class 455 at East Croydon in 1997

Overview
- Franchises: Network SouthCentral; 26 May 1996 – 12 October 1996; South Central; 13 October 1996 – 25 August 2001
- Main region: South
- Other regions: London, South East
- Parent company: Connex
- Reporting mark: CX
- Predecessor: Network SouthCentral
- Successor: Southern

Connex South Central was a British train operating company owned by Connex that operated the Network SouthCentral franchise from 26 May 1996 until 12 October 1996 and the South Central franchise from 13 October 1996 until 25 August 2001.

== History ==
On 26 May 1996, Connex commenced operating the Network SouthCentral franchise. Later on 13 October 1996 Connex rebranded the franchise South Central and introduced a white, yellow and blue livery.

The operator was criticised for poor customer service (on average one in five Connex trains was delayed) and for using old slam-door trains, rather than spend any money on buying modern sliding-door rolling stock built to higher safety standards (though Connex ordered new trains for Connex South Eastern). This widespread disgust at filthy trains and widespread delays caused criticism of Connex, but it was poor financial management that ultimately caused Connex to lose the franchise.

In March 2000 the Strategic Rail Authority announced its intention to relet the franchise, with Connex and Govia the shortlisted bidders.

On 24 October 2000 the Shadow Strategic Rail Authority announced that Govia had been awarded the franchise and would operate it from 2003. Govia negotiated a deal with Connex to buy out the remainder of its franchise with the transaction completed in August 2001.

== Services ==
Connex South Central ran passenger services from London Charing Cross, London Bridge and London Victoria to Beckenham Junction, Epsom Downs, East Grinstead, Uckfield, Caterham, Tattenham Corner, Horsham, Littlehampton, Bognor Regis, Bournemouth, Portsmouth, Brighton, Eastbourne and Ore.

It also ran services between Hastings and Ashford, Brighton and Hastings, Brighton, Newhaven Marine and Seaford and Brighton and Southampton as well as South London suburban services serving Crystal Palace, Sutton and West Croydon.

Services between West Croydon and Wimbledon, which were operated by Connex South Central following privatisation, ceased in 1997. The line was subsequently converted for Tramlink operation.

On 2 June 1997 Connex South Central introduced a new service from Gatwick Airport to Rugby via the West London and West Coast lines using Class 319s. In December 2000 it was curtailed to Watford Junction but extended southwards to Brighton.

== Rolling stock ==
Connex South Central inherited a wide fleet of 'slam' and sliding door diesel electric and electric multiple units. The slam-door units were not replaced under Connex, but were all later withdrawn after South Central (later rebranded Southern) took over.

Connex South Central's fleet was maintained at Brighton Lovers Walk and Selhurst depots.

Class	Image	Type	Number	Carriages	Built
205		DEMU	10	2 or 3	1957–1962
207		DEMU	4	3	1962
319		EMU	20	4	1987–1988
411		EMU	3	4	1956–1963
421		EMU	107	4	1964–1972
423		EMU	59	4	1967–1974
455		EMU	46	4	1982–1985
456		EMU	24	2	1990–1991

Preceded by Network SouthCentral; As part of British Rail	Operator of Network SouthCentral franchise 26 May 1996–12 October 1996	Succeeded by Connex South Central; South Central franchise
Preceded by Connex South Central; Network SouthCentral franchise	Operator of South Central franchise 13 October 1996–2001	Succeeded by South Central
