= Vivarail D-Train =

Train family

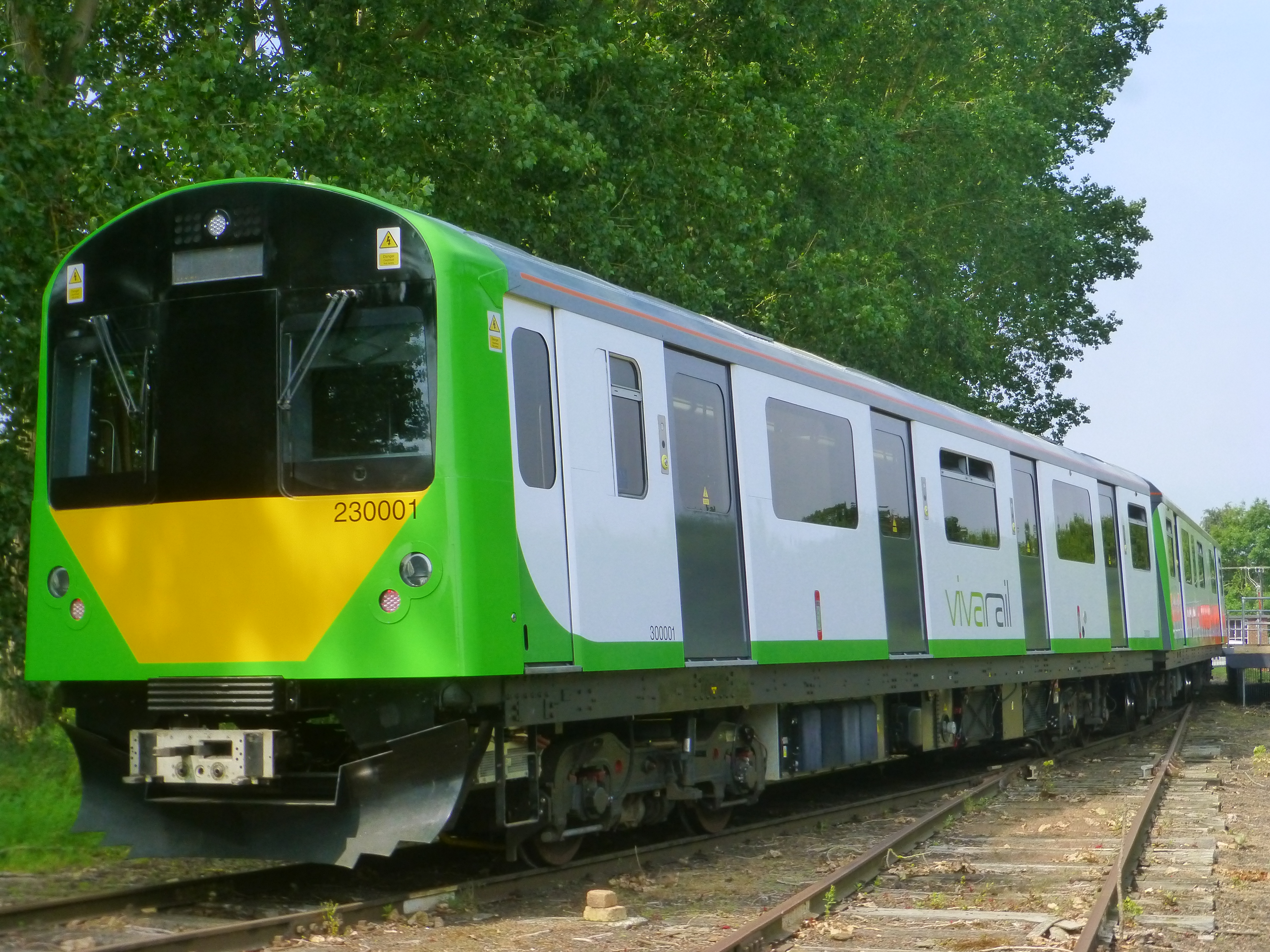
- Class 230 prototype
- Manufacturers: Metro-Cammell (original construction); Vivarail (conversion)
- Built at: Quinton Rail Technology Centre (conversion)
- Family name: D78 old London underground tube stock
- Replaced: Class 150; Class 153; Class 165; Class 483
- Constructed: 2015 - 2022
- Number built: 15
- Number in service: 15
- Predecessor: D78 tube stock
- Formation: 2-3 cars per unit
- Fleet numbers: 230001 to 230124
- Operators: Transport for Wales; Island Line; GWR
- Depots: Ryde TMD; Birkenhead North; Reading TMD
- Lines served: TfW Borderlands Line; SWR Island line; GWR Greenford Branch

Specifications
- Car body construction: Aluminium
- Car length: Driving Motor: 18.652 m (61 ft 2 in); Other: 18.399 m (60 ft 4 in)
- Width: 2.84 m (9 ft 4 in)
- Platform height: Level
- Maximum speed: 97 kilometres per hour (60 mph)
- Traction system: 3rd rail or lithium battery
- Prime mover: Ford Duratorq
- Electric systems: Hoppecke Li-ion batteries 750 V DC third rail
- Current collection: Contact shoe
- Safety systems: AWS, TPWS
- Coupling system: Wedglock
- Multiple working: With-in-class
- Track gauge: 4 ft 8 1/2 in (1,435 mm) standard gauge

The Vivarail D-Train is a family of multiple units remanufactured by Vivarail for the British rail network. They are converted from London Underground D78 Stock, originally manufactured between 1978 and 1981 by Metro-Cammell. Two versions have been produced: the Class 230 diesel electric multiple unit and the Class 484 electric multiple unit.

== History ==
In 2015, Vivarail purchased 226 London Underground D78 Stock carriages with the aim of converting them to multiple units. It was estimated that they would cost one-third of that of a new build train.

== Prototypes ==
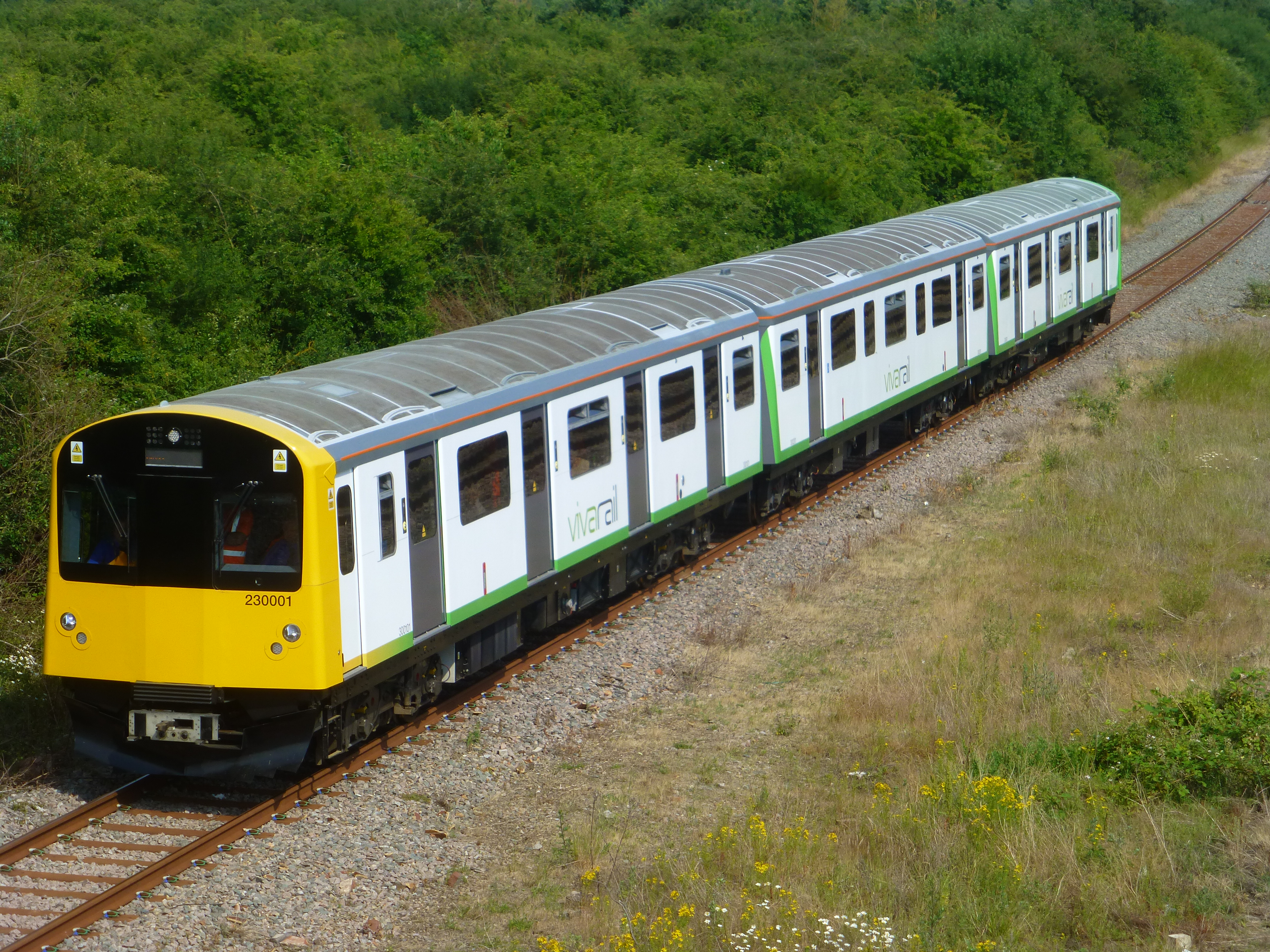
The first prototype unit operating during the 2017 Rail Live event

A prototype was produced for testing and accreditation in August 2015. The initial prototype D-Train was built as a three-car diesel-electric unit, which was completed in the summer of 2016, following which it underwent a programme of main-line testing, with the intention that it be used on a year-long trial service on the Coventry to Nuneaton line by London Midland. This was cancelled after the unit caught fire. This unit was first used in passenger service at the 2017 Rail Live exhibition, running a service from Honeybourne to the event location at Quinton.

The second prototype was built as a two-car battery-electric unit; although self-powered like the original, instead of a diesel engine to power the traction motors, this unit uses batteries that can be recharged from a charging point at each end of its journey. This unit was complete by the summer of 2018, and was put on a testing programme. In October 2018, it was taken to the Bo'ness and Kinneil Railway carrying its first passengers. This culminated in the battery powered unit running a distance of 40 miles using battery power alone, a first for a train in the UK, in January 2020.

A feature that has been reintroduced in these units include the passenger door open buttons. When first introduced in 1980 in unpainted livery the units consisted of door buttons on the exterior and interior pressed by passengers to open the doors. Upon refurbishment, the interior door buttons were removed and the exterior ones were panelled over. After conversion this feature was provided again similar to London Underground pre-refurbishment.

== Orders ==
=== West Midlands Trains ===
The first full D-Train order came from West Midlands Trains, which procured three 2-car Class 230 DEMUs for use on the Marston Vale line. These were operated under the London Northwestern Railway brand, with the first entering service on 23 April 2019, but were since withdrawn and replaced with 150s.

=== Transport for Wales ===
A second order for Class 230s came from KeolisAmey Wales, with five 3-car sets ordered. Although these are also Class 230s, rather than straight DEMUs they will be built as diesel/battery hybrid units, to be used on the Borderlands line, Conwy Valley line and Chester to Crewe line.

=== Island Line ===
In 2019, South Western Railway announced an order for five 2-car D-Train sets for use by its Island Line operation on the Isle of Wight. These were ordered as third rail EMUs, becoming Class 484.

=== Pop-up Metro ===
The Railroad Development Corporation has ordered at least one 2-car Class 230-variant to operate on the Iowa Interstate Railroad in 2021 as a "pop-up" metro service.

=== Great Western Railway ===
In February 2022, Great Western Railway announced it had signed a deal with Vivarail to trial a fast-charging battery variant of the Class 230 for use on the West Ealing to Greenford branch line off the GWML. Trials were expected to launch in late 2022 to early 2023. Unit 230 001 began passenger operations for the first time on the Greenford branch line on 31 January 2026, and is used for passenger services on Saturdays, alongside the 165 DMUs.

== D-Train variants ==
Class	Operator	Introduced	Number	Power	Carriages	Carriage Length (m)	Door configuration	Image	Notes
230	Great Western Railway	2015	1	Battery-electric	3	18.37 m (60 ft 3 in) (DM); 18.12 m (59 ft 5 in) (T)	Sliding pocket		
230	Railroad Development Corporation	2018	1	Battery-electric	2	18.37 m (60 ft 3 in) (DM); 18.12 m (59 ft 5 in) (T)	Sliding pocket		Unveiled in 2018.
230	Stored	2019	3	Diesel-electric	2	18.37 m (60 ft 3 in) (DM); 18.12 m (59 ft 5 in) (T)	Sliding pocket		
230	Transport for Wales	2023	5	Diesel-battery	3	18.37 m (60 ft 3 in) (DM); 18.12 m (59 ft 5 in) (T)	Sliding pocket		
484	Island Line	2021	5	DC electric	2	18.37 m (60 ft 3 in) (DM); 18.12 m (59 ft 5 in) (T)	Sliding pocket		
