= British Rail Class 483 =

Class of British electric multiple unit train

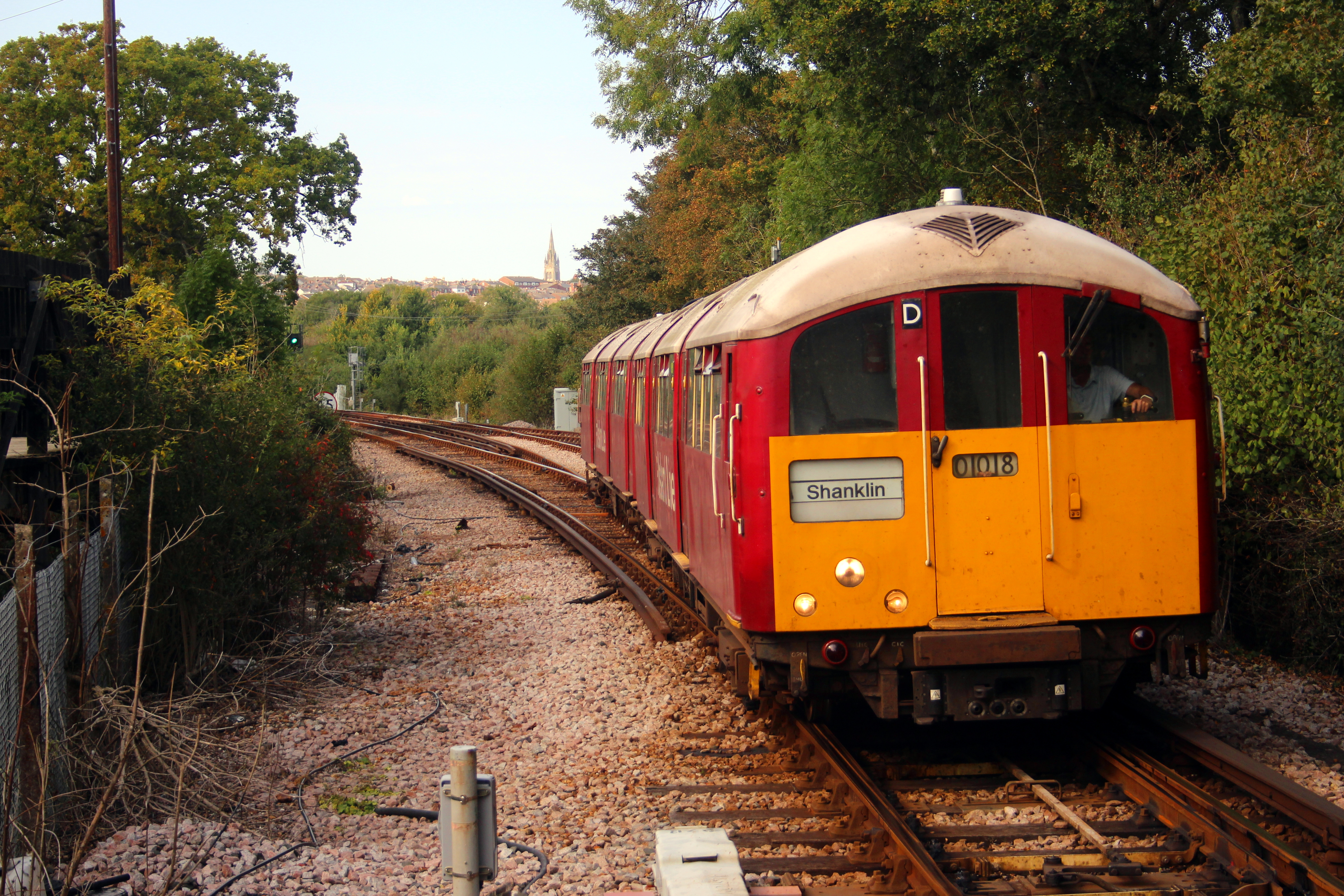
- A Class 483 at Smallbrook Junction

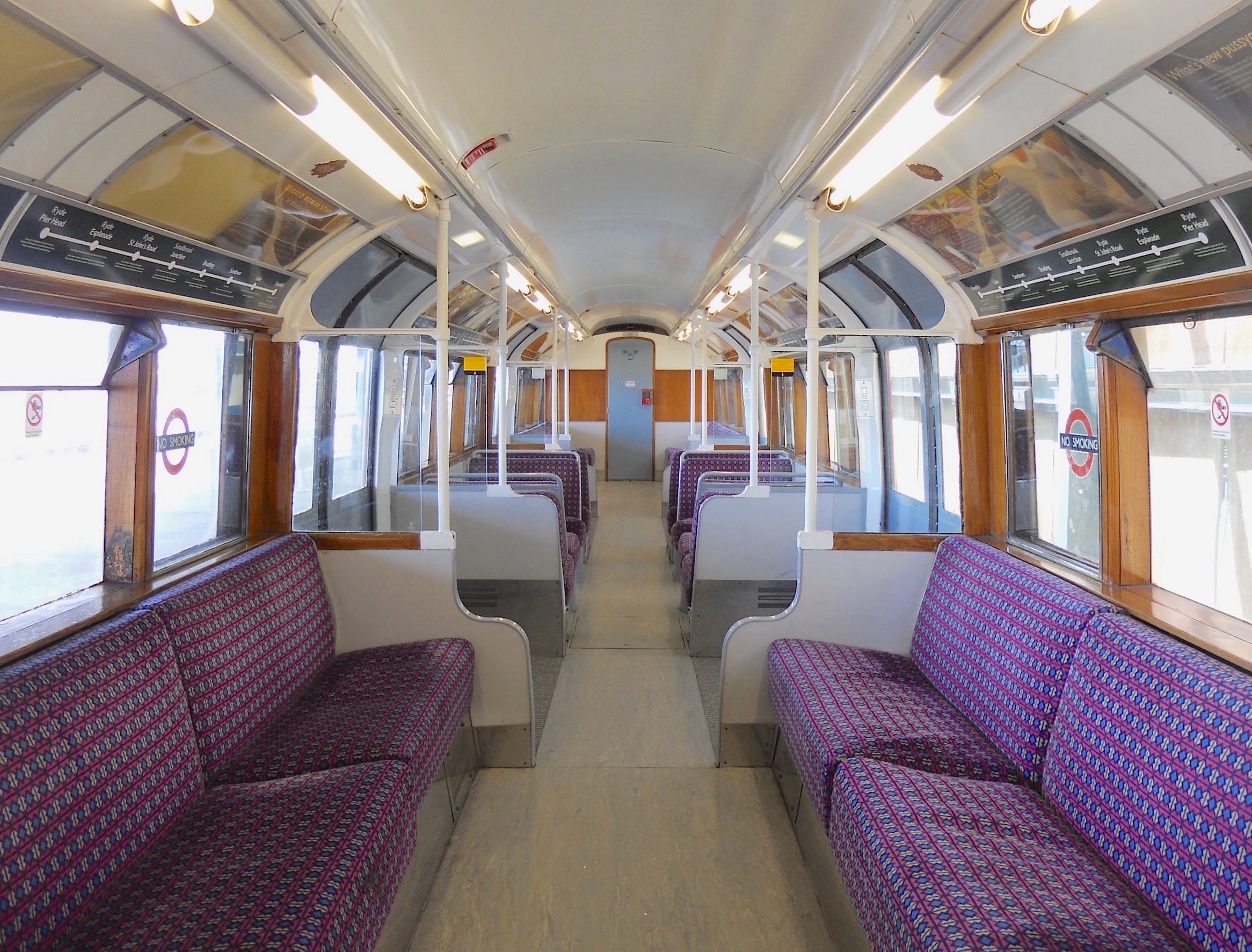
- The refurbished interior of an Island Line Class 483 EMU.
- In service: 1938–1988 on London Underground (as 1938 stock); 1989–2021 on Island Line
- Manufacturer: Metro-Cammell
- Family name: Tube
- Replaced: British Rail Classes 485 and 486
- Successor: British Rail Class 484
- Formation: 2 cars per trainset
- Capacity: 84 seats (2 car set)
- Operator: Island Line
- Depot: Ryde depot

Specifications
- Car length: 52 ft 3 3/4 in (15.94 m)
- Maximum speed: 45 mph (72 km/h)
- Weight: 55 t (54 long tons; 61 short tons) each 2 car set.
- Power output: 500 kW (670 hp) total power per 2 car set.
- Electric system: 660 V DC 3rd rail
- Current collection: Contact shoe
- Multiple working: Within class
- Track gauge: 4 ft 8 1/2 in (1,435 mm) standard gauge

The British Rail Class 483 electric multiple units were originally built as 1938 tube stock units for London Underground. They were extensively refurbished between 1989 and 1992 by Eastleigh Works, for use on services on the Isle of Wight's Island Line. This was despite having already been used for nearly 50 years on the London Underground network. The units replaced the even older and life-expired British Rail Classes 485 and 486 units which were introduced in 1967, but were originally built as 'Standard' stock units for the London Electric Railway in 1923.

The 483s were 83 years old when they were withdrawn in January 2021; they were the oldest passenger trains in Great Britain in regular passenger service at the time. That honour was passed to the London Underground 1972 Stock trains that are still in service on the Bakerloo line at 54 years old. The 483s were withdrawn on 3 January 2021, with the line closed from 4 January until 1 November 2021 for upgrade works, after which they were replaced by five two-car Class 484s. Of the six units present on the Island at the time of their withdrawal, all have been confirmed for preservation.

== History ==
=== Prior to Isle of Wight service ===
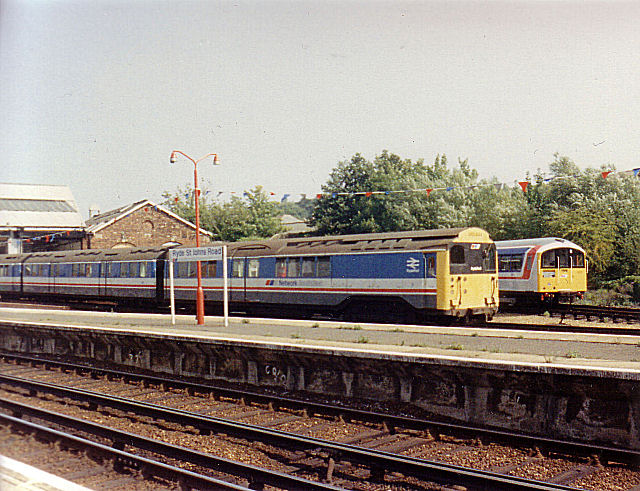
A British Class 483 (right) at Ryde St John's Road in 1989, sat alongside a British Rail Class 485, derived from London Underground Standard Stock

The trains were originally built by Metro-Cammell as 1938 tube stock for London Underground. An initial batch was withdrawn from service in 1973, and they were considered for use on the Island Line (which would not bear that name for another 16 years). However, the under-floor equipment was thought to be a problem, as extensive adaptations would be needed to Ryde Works to allow fitters to access it. It was also felt that the under-floor equipment would be vulnerable to salt water damage on Ryde Pier, especially in bad weather.

The last batch of 1938 stock was withdrawn in London in 1985, except for five trains required on the Northern line between 1986 and May 1988 due to increasing passenger numbers. In 1987, Network SouthEast (NSE) managers realised that the existing 1923-built Class 485 trains on the Isle of Wight would not be economically serviceable beyond around 1990 and thoughts turned to the future of the line. After closure of the route was discounted, it was decided to purchase and refurbish 1938 stock.

In April 1988, London Underground offered a total of 28 carriages in revenue-earning condition to NSE, joined by three further carriages in May 1989. In addition, between May 1988 and October 1990, four scrap vehicles and nine works vehicles, to be used for spare parts, were taken from LU's Ruislip depot. While the project's feasibility study suggested that three-car units would be preferred, it was thought that the alterations required to Ryde depot would be both difficult and expensive. It was instead decided that two-car units would be used, using a maximum of six coaches in any train formation. Of the 31 coaches available, 20 were selected for use on the island. These were extensively refurbished between 1989 and 1992 by Eastleigh Works to ready them for service on the line.

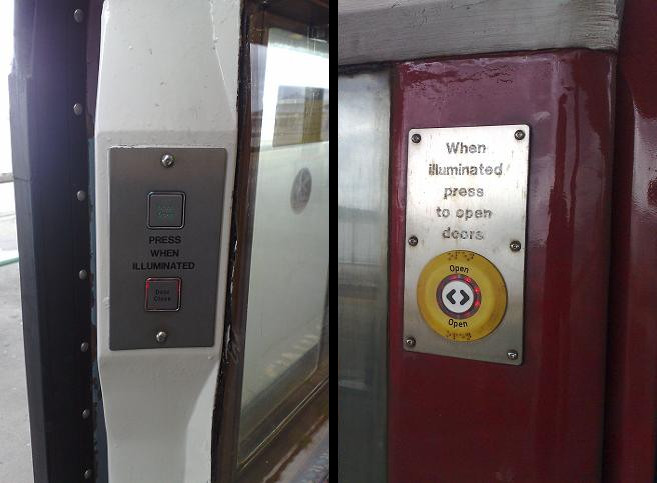
Interior (left) and exterior (right) door open/close buttons retro-fitted to the BR Class 483 units.

As well as cosmetic and structural work, significant electrical works were required both to replace dilapidated wiring, and to allow the trains to work from the line's third rail electrical supply.

Eight two-car units were initially refurbished between 1989 and 1990. These units were numbered 483001–008, although only the final three digits were carried on the cab ends. Units were painted in the new Network SouthEast livery, of blue with red and white stripes. The first unit was tested on the South West Main Line between Basingstoke and Eastleigh before travelling to Fratton ready for its transfer to the island. Testing and crew training on the remaining units took place on the Portsmouth Direct Line and Shepperton Branch Line.

=== On the island ===
The first unit, 001, arrived on the Isle of Wight on 5 July 1989 following an overnight ferry crossing from Portsmouth to Fishbourne. It was delivered by road to Sandown, then hauled to Ryde depot by one of the existing passenger trains. It began test running on the Island Line in the evening of 6 July, before a public launch on 13 July. Regular passenger services using the Class 483 did not commence until October, while the last of the eight planned units did not enter service until July 1990.

While it was originally planned to use only eight units, in 1992—two years after the rest of the fleet had entered service—the ninth unit, numbered 009, was also refurbished and transported to the island. A 10th unit was also shipped to Ryde depot, although this was for spares only and was never used in passenger operation on the Island. This unit was unofficially given the unit number 483010.

Each unit was formed of two driving motor vehicles, numbered 121–129 and 221–229. The technical description of this formation was DMSO(A)+DMSO(B).

When the units were first introduced, the final digit of the unit number and the final digit of the carriage numbers corresponded, such that unit 001 was formed of vehicles 121 and 221. However, since then, a few rearrangements have taken place to the unit formations.

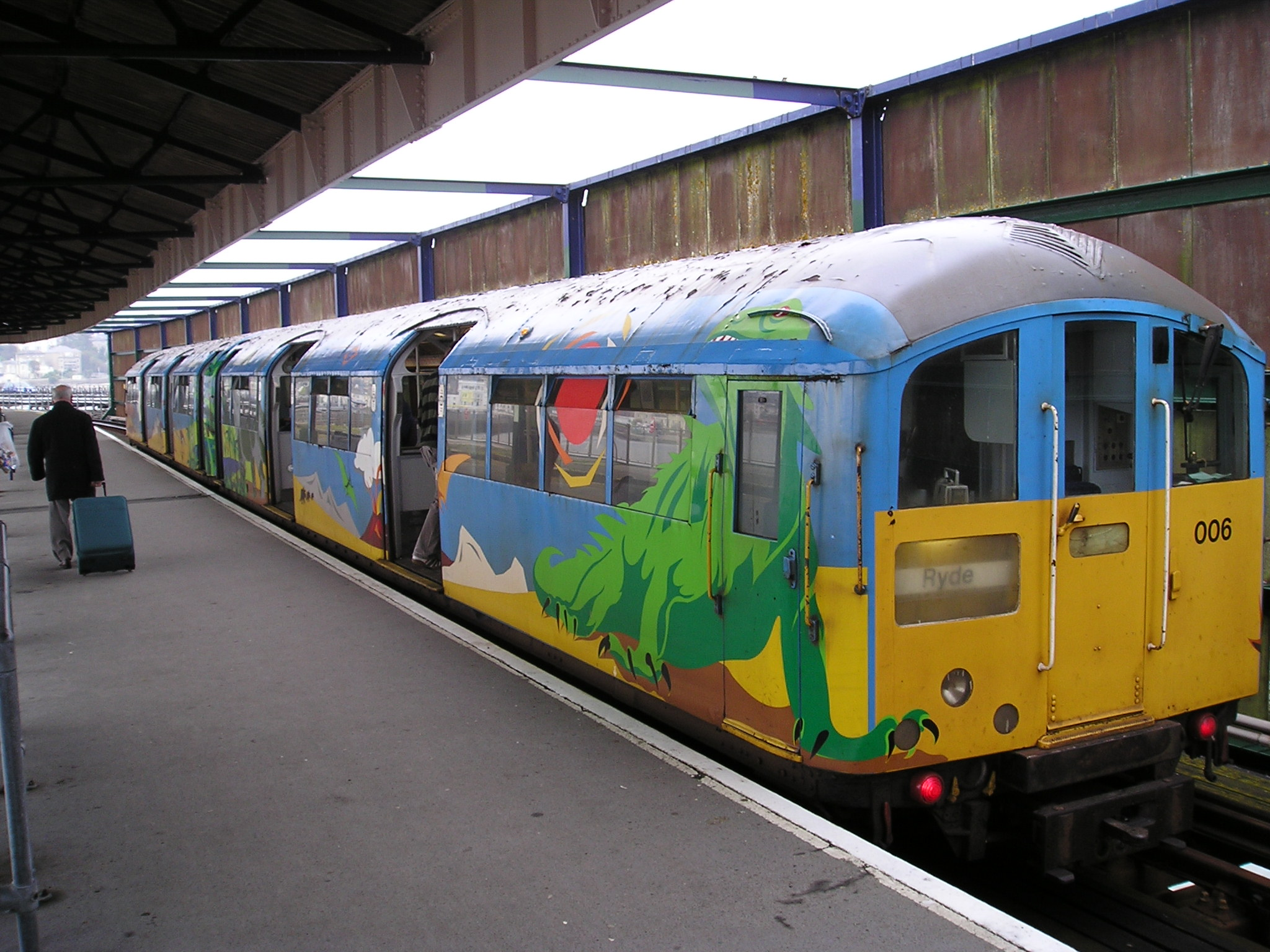
483006 stands at Ryde Pier Head in 2007, sporting its dinosaur livery intended to attract tourists to the line.

In 1996, with the privatisation of British Rail, the Ryde–Shanklin line became the Island Line franchise, which was won by the Stagecoach Group. Services continued to be branded as Island Line trains. In 1999 three units (001, 003 and 005) were permanently withdrawn from service as surplus to requirements, leaving only six units remaining serviceable. In the early 2000s, the remaining units were overhauled and were repainted into a new livery of blue and yellow with pictures of dinosaurs. From 2007 to 2008, all units were repainted into their original London Transport red livery (albeit with yellow warning panels on the cab rather than the original red).

According to an article in the October 2005 issue of Rail Professional magazine, at that time Island Line was paying "an eye-watering £140,000 a year" to lease the trains, meaning that "[s]ince privatisation, HSBC Rail has pocketed over £1m for leasing these relics that are effectively worthless." In March 2007, South West Trains purchased the rolling stock outright from the leasing company HSBC Rail for £1.

Further that year, the Island Line franchise was amalgamated with South West Trains as part of the new South Western franchise.

=== Refurbishment ===
The Class 483 trains were last refurbished during 2007; work on the six unit fleet included:

- an exterior repaint into London Transport maroon with cream window pillars
- a retrim of the seat moquette into the same moquette that the London Underground A60/62 Stock received during their refurbishment between 1993 and 1998

When South Western Railway took over the franchise in 2017, it launched a consultation on the future of Island Line services, revealing that only three of the six remaining units were serviceable.

=== Replacement ===
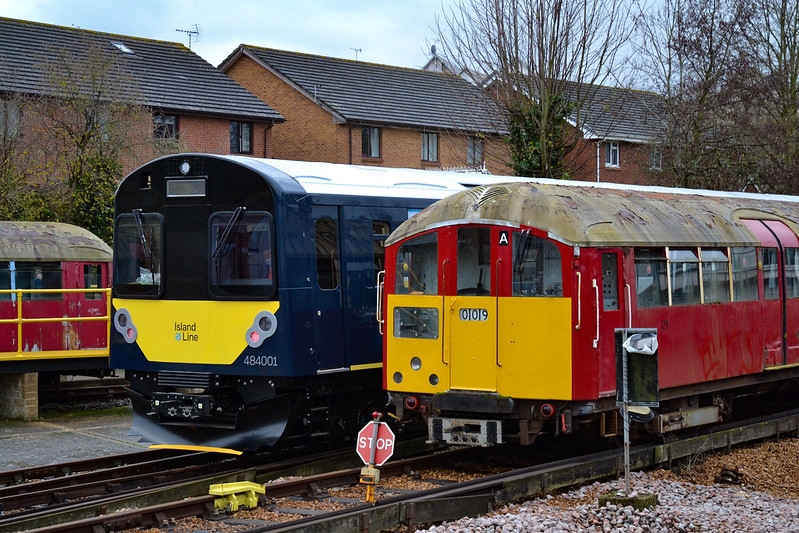
484001 stands next to 483009 at Ryde Traincare Depot, illustrating the difference in loading gauge between the ex-deep-level Tube Class 483 unit and the ex-sub-surface Class 484 unit

On 13 September 2019, South Western Railway announced that because of a "safety issue" only one of the units was able to run, which meant cancelling just under half of scheduled services and running only an hourly service on the Island Line. This reduction in service was by mid-September expected to last for approximately one month, until 14 October, but the company warned that the trains' age and increasing difficulty of getting spare parts meant it might take longer. Normal service was not restored for approximately 5 weeks, but further fleet faults brought repeated disruption through much of November. Just 3 days after the news that only one Class 483 was serviceable, on 16 September 2019 the government announced that the fleet would be replaced by five two-car Class 484s.

=== Preservation ===
The London Transport Traction Group was founded to facilitate the preservation of a Class 483 unit to run via an on-board power supply on the Epping Ongar Railway in Essex. On 24 November 2020, the group confirmed that it had been successful in securing a unit, probably 006 or 008. It was later announced that both 006 and 008 were going to be preserved by the group.

After problems relating to a lack of space at the Epping Ongar Railway, the London Transport Traction Group announced that Units 006 and 008 will instead be preserved at the Llanelli and Mynydd Mawr Railway, making 006 and 008 the first tube trains to be housed at a preserved railway in Wales.

The Isle of Wight Steam Railway received unit 483007, Jess Harper, which had gone under a 3-year overhaul shortly before retirement, being the last of the Class 483s to be overhauled at Ryde Traincare Depot. It is planned, in the short term, for the unit to be displayed in the 'Train Story Discovery Centre'. It is hoped that in the years to come the unit will be able to run on its own power along the line.

On 29 July 2020, SWR, the owner and operator, announced that it was looking for new homes for the trains as soon as possible, to make room for the arrival of the first Class 484 units for testing later in the year. SWR had already received enquiries from preservation groups, including the adjacent Isle of Wight Steam Railway. Organisations expressing interest will need to demonstrate the capacity and financial security to remove and look after the train, as well as an appropriate long-term physical storage location.

== Fleet details ==
Only two of nine units remained serviceable throughout most of 2020, the remainder having been taken out of service progressively since April 2000. On 29 July 2020 South Western Railway announced that the six extant units would be offered for preservation. Despite its impending withdrawal, unit 007 received a full overhaul, returning to service on 11 December 2020.

Key:	Scrapped	Preserved

Unit No.	Vehicle Nos.				Delivered to LPTB		Livery	Status	Notes
Unit No.	DMSO(A)		DMSO(B)		DMSO(A)	DMSO(B)	Livery	Status	Notes
483001	121	ex-10184	221	ex-11184	19 August 1939	19 August 1939	Network SouthEast	Scrapped	Scrapped at Ryde St John's Road in June 2006.
483002	122	ex-10221	225	ex-11142	13 November 1939	27 February 1939	London Transport Red	Preserved	Both cars currently at Railway Support Services, Wishaw.
483003	123	ex-10116	223	ex-11116	10 January 1939	10 January 1939	Network SouthEast	Scrapped	Previously stored in a siding near Ryde St John's Road as a source of spare parts. Scrapped in April 2000.
483004	124	ex-10205	224	ex-11205	10 October 1939	10 October 1939	London Transport Red	Preserved	Previously stored at Ryde St John's Road since 2019 as a source of spare parts. Delivered to Holliers Park, Hale Common, Arreton for renovation and use as an onsite café on 20 May 2021.
483005	125	ex-10142	222	ex-11221	27 February 1939	13 November 1939	Network Southeast	Scrapped	Scrapped at Ryde St John's Road in April 2000.
483006	126	ex-10297	226	ex-11297	1 July 1940	1 July 1940	London Transport Red with Island line logos	Preserved	Withdrawn from service on 3 January 2021. Preserved by the London Transport Traction Group at the Llanelli and Mynydd Mawr Railway. Car 226 currently partly in "pseudo" LT condition with a red cab end and mock top marker lights and one side of the car painted completely red due to vandalism which occurred while the unit was at Ryde St Johns Depot
483007	127	ex-10291	227	ex-11291	17 June 1940	17 June 1940	London Transport Red with Island line logos	Preserved	Named Jess Harper on 15 December 2020. Withdrawn from service on 3 January 2021. Preserved at the Isle of Wight Steam Railway's Train Story exhibit at Havenstreet railway station. Preserved in London Transport Red with Island Line logos, and vinyl nameplates.
483008	128	ex-10255	228	ex-11255	26 February 1940	26 February 1940	London Transport Red with Island line logos	Preserved	Withdrawn from service on 4 December 2020. Preserved by the London Transport Traction Group at Llanelli. One car of this set will be converted to run on batteries. Currently still in as Withdrawn condition (Minus a few windows due to vandalism)
483009	129	ex-10229	229	ex-11229	10 June 1940	10 June 1940	London Transport Red	Preserved	In use as a shunter at Ryde depot since 2016 until withdrawal. Coach 129 was purchased by a private buyer and transported to the East Somerset Railway in August 2021 where it is awaiting restoration by Cranmore Traincare & Maintenance Services. Externally Restored to LT condition, other car stripped of parts, and in storage at Reid Freight, Longton, as of June 2022.
(483010)	-	ex-10139	-	ex-11172	20 February 1939	13 July 1939	Blue undercoat	Scrapped	An additional unit used for spare parts. Gutted at Ryde depot in 2001 and afterwards scrapped.

== Gallery ==
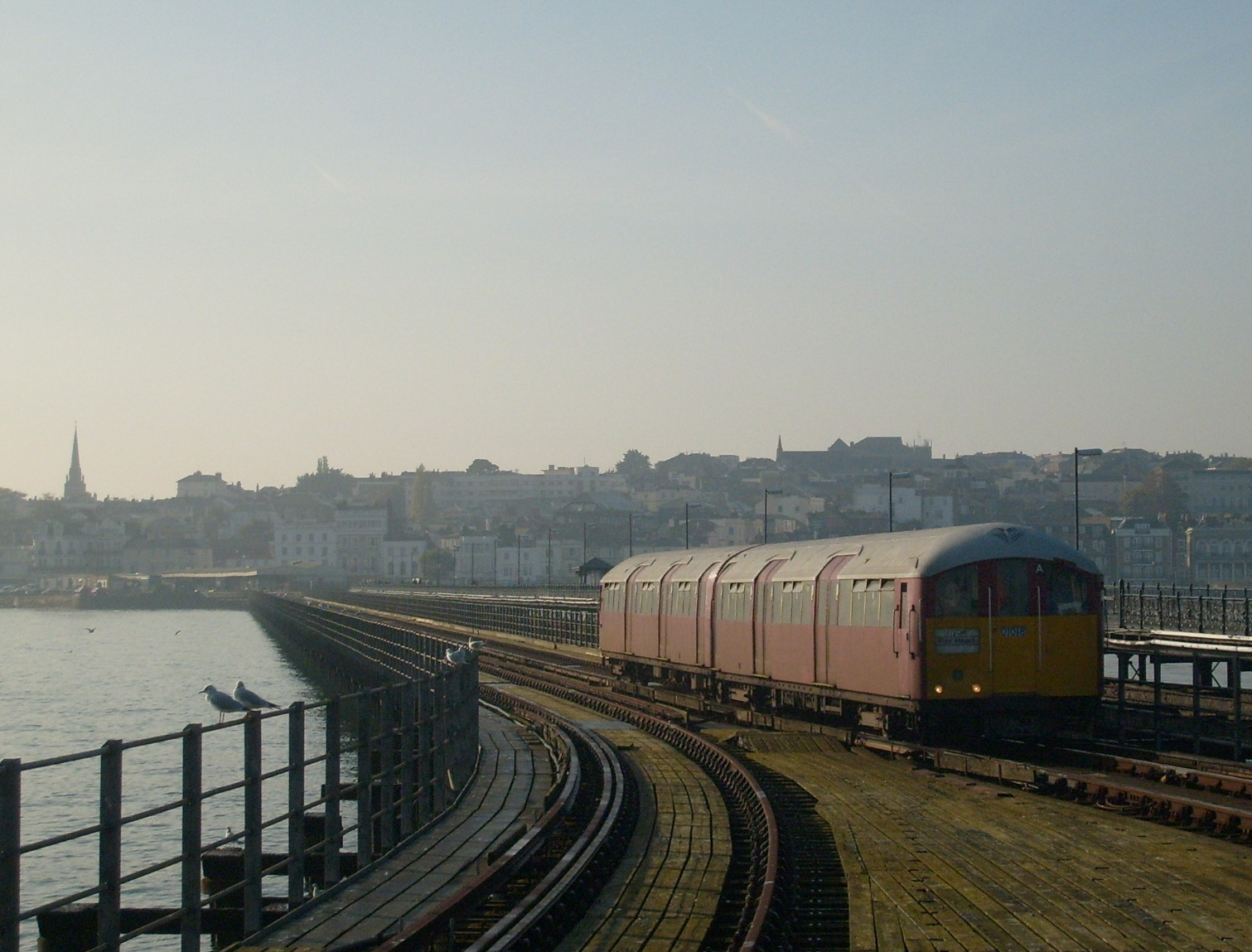
Island Line No. 008 arrives at Ryde Pier Head, wearing the final used livery based on that of London Transport.

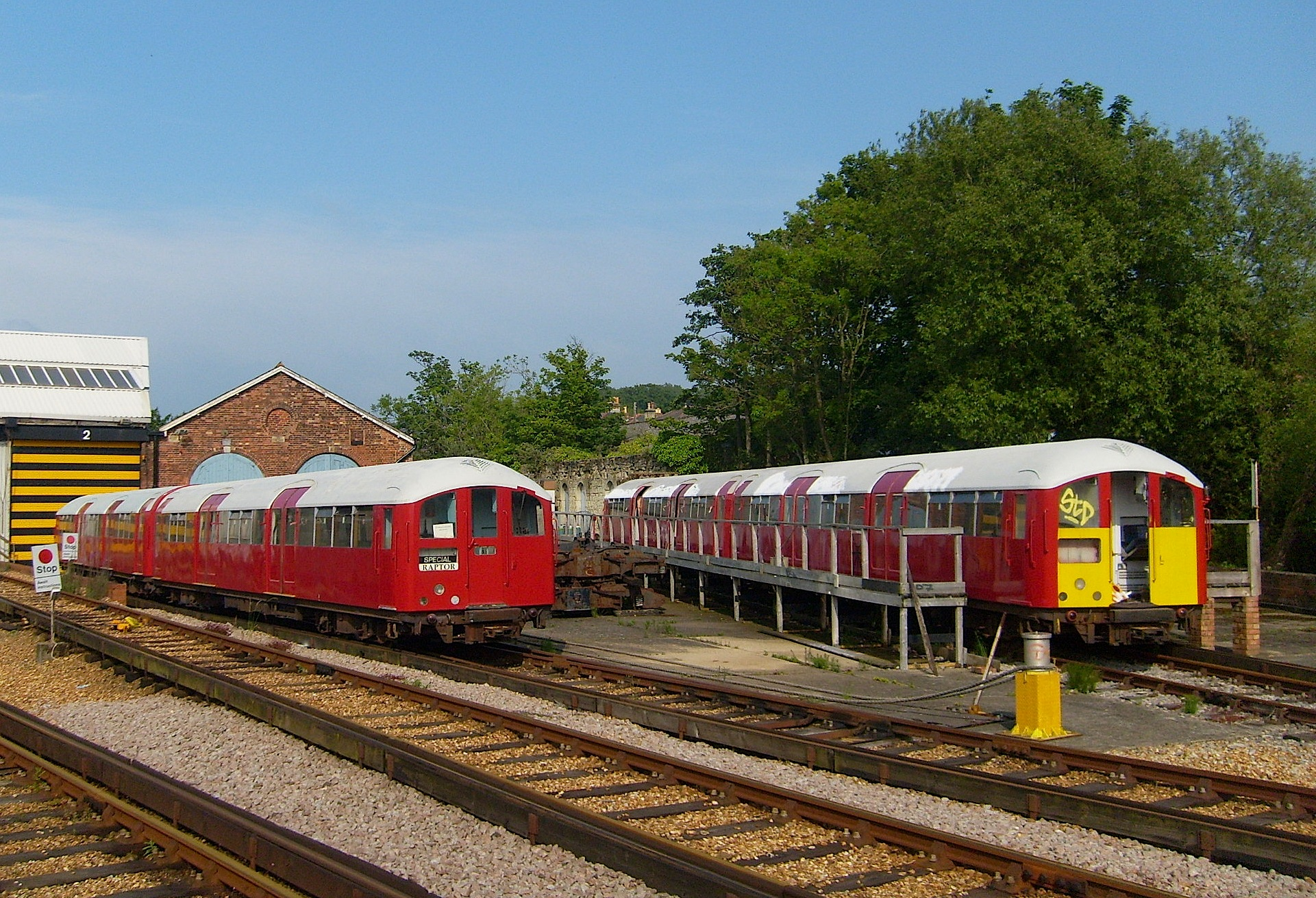
Island Line Class 483 EMUs No. 002 and 007 at Ryde Electric Depot.

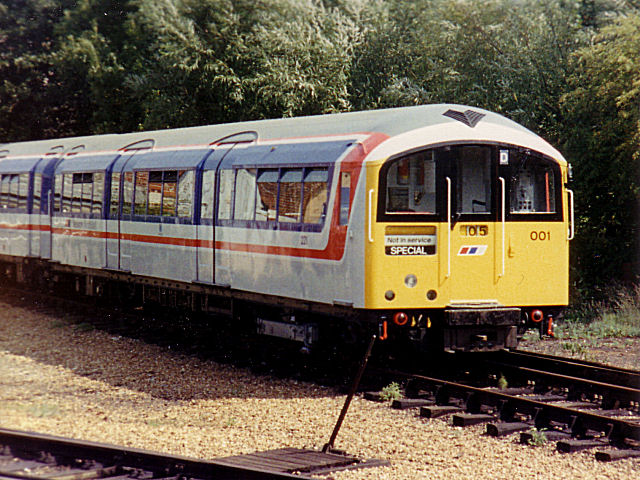
Class 483 unit No. 001 on display at Ryde depot in 1989, shortly after transfer to the Isle of Wight. It carries British Rail's Network SouthEast livery.

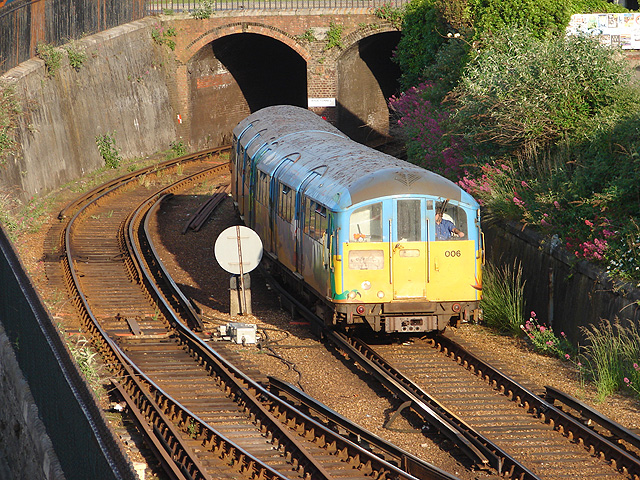
Dinosaur liveried 483006 at work with Island Line in June 2008.

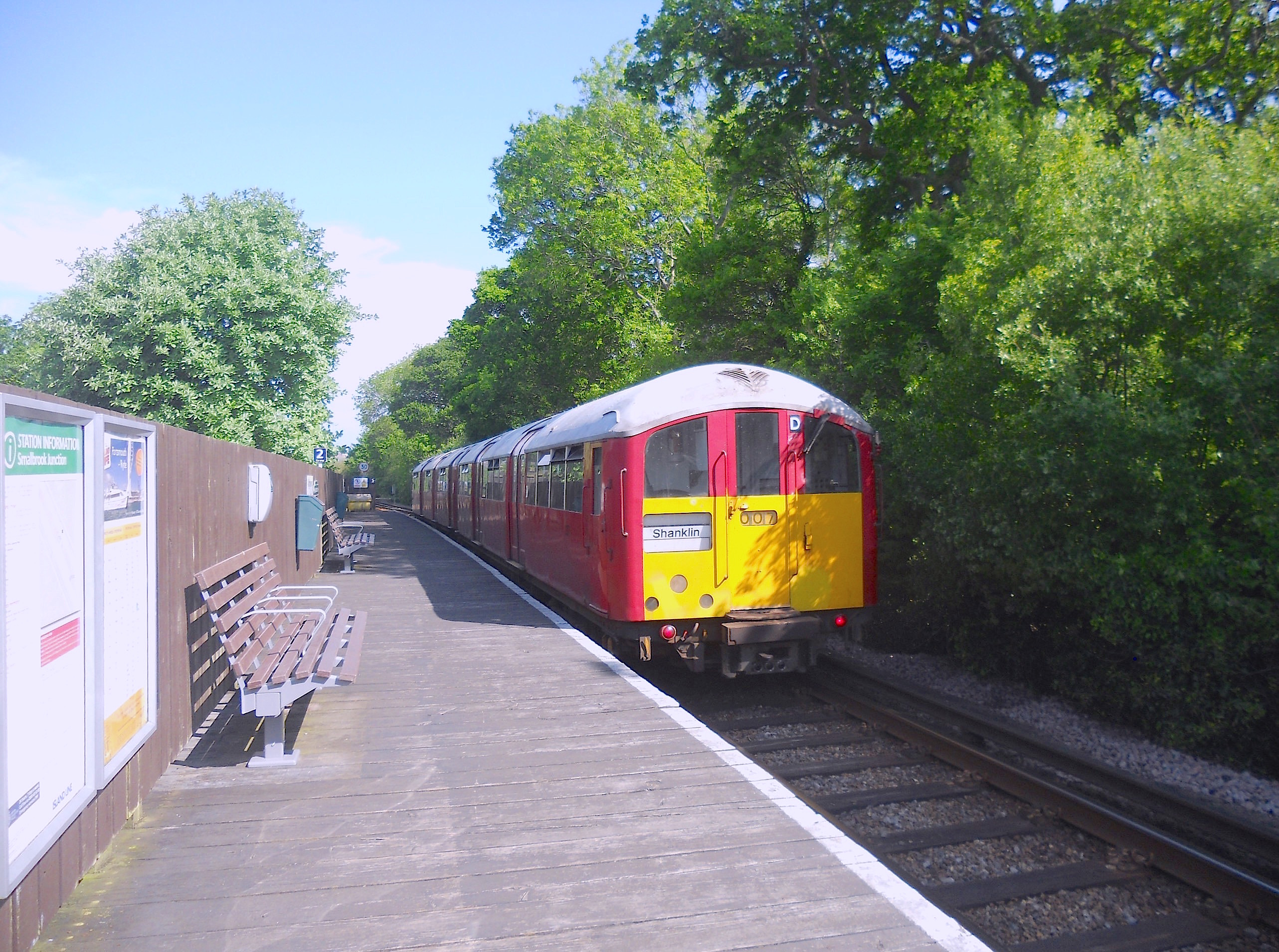
Island Line Class 483 No. 007 departs Smallbrook Junction, with a service bound for Ryde Pier Head.

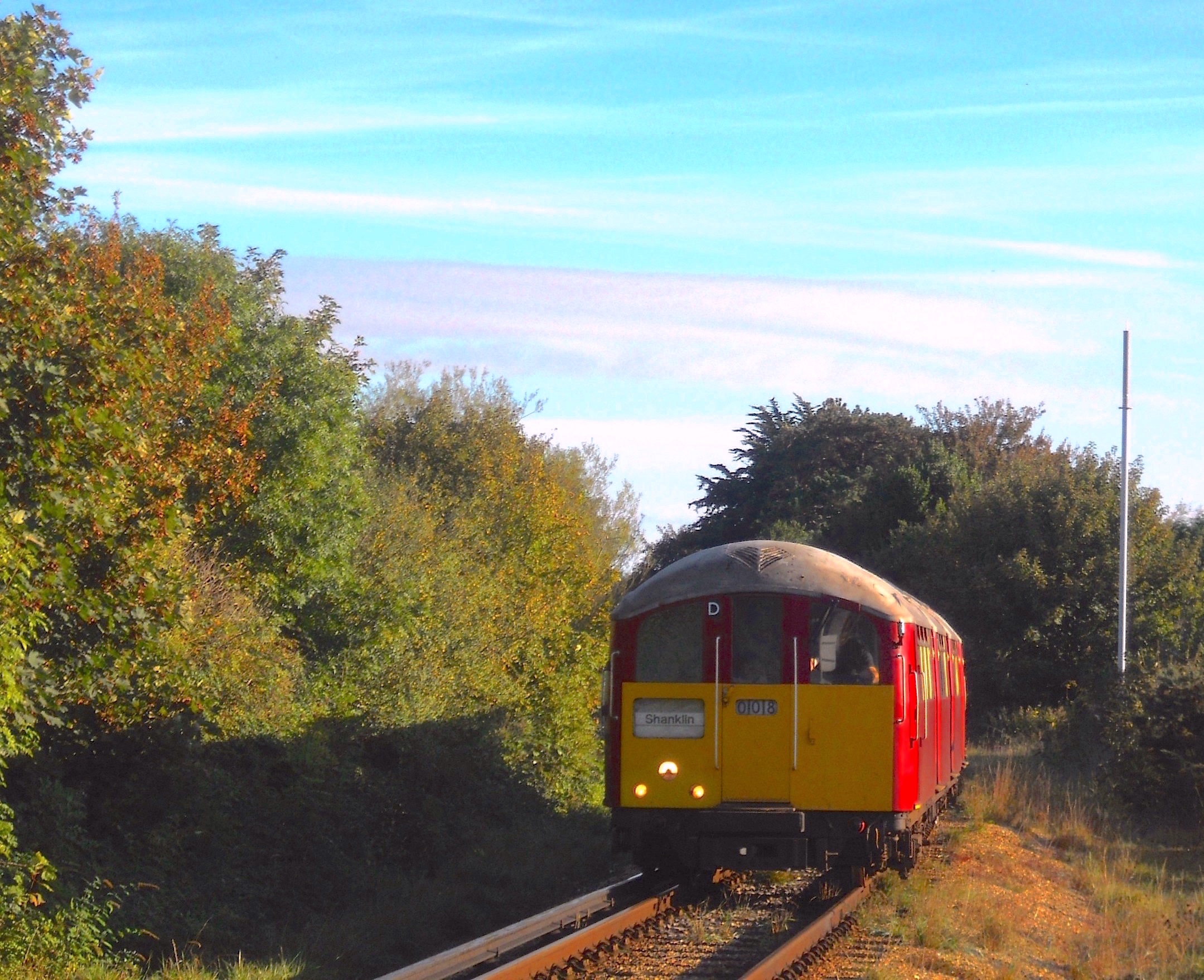
Island Line Class 483 No. 008 arrives at Shanklin.

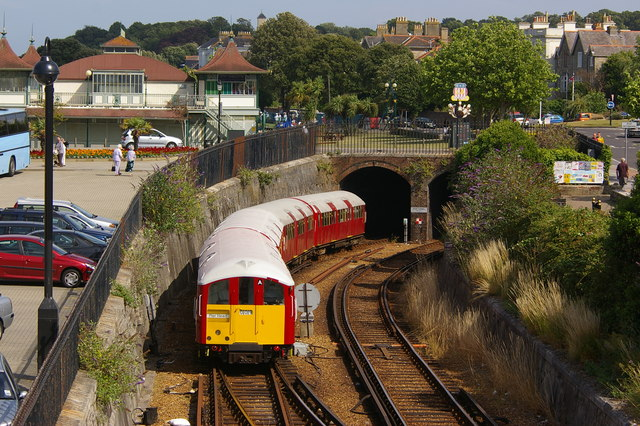
A pair of Island Line Class 483s in London Underground livery entering the Ryde tunnel.

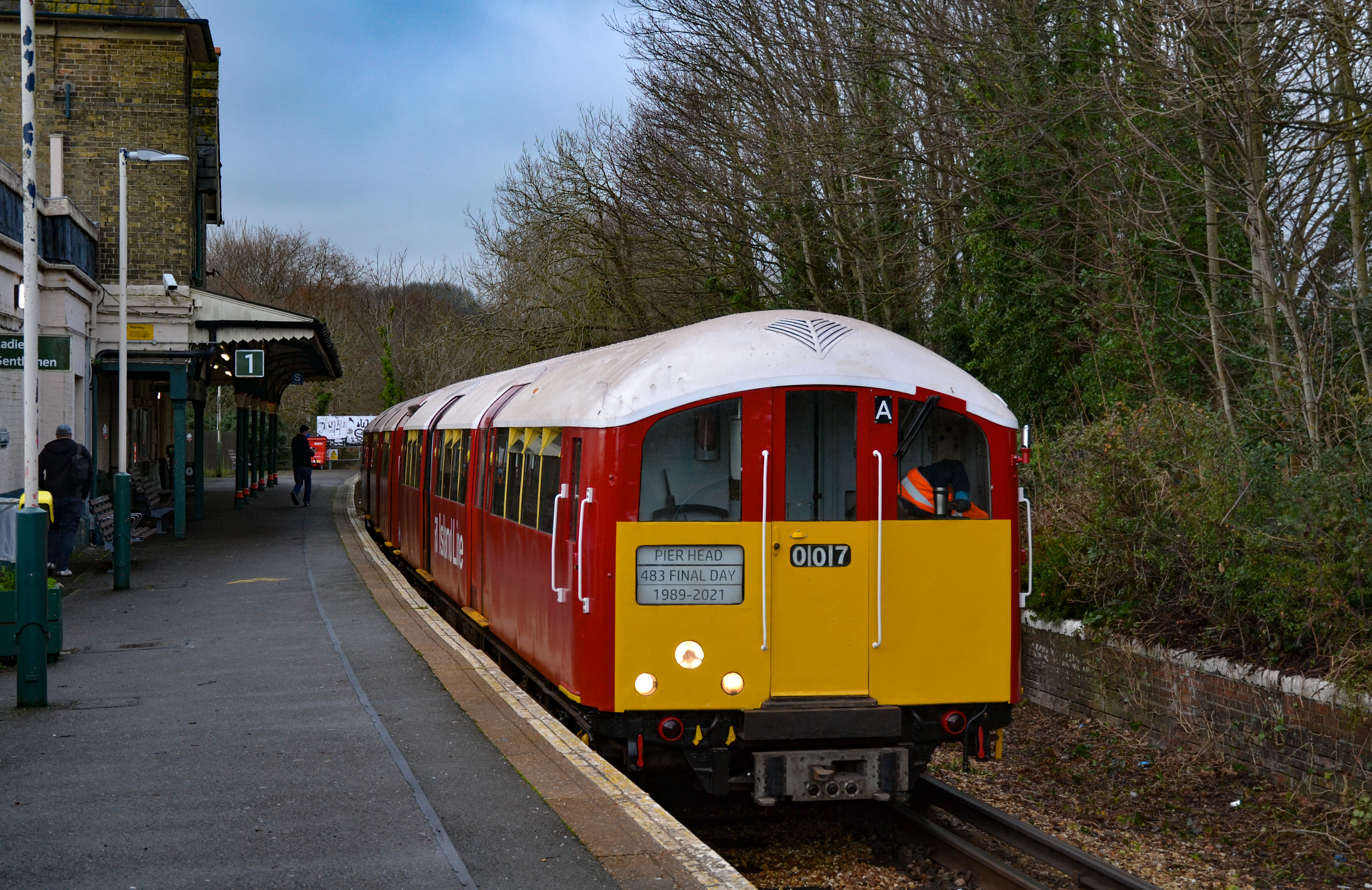
483007 Jess Harper at Shanklin on the final day of the fleet's service for the Island Line

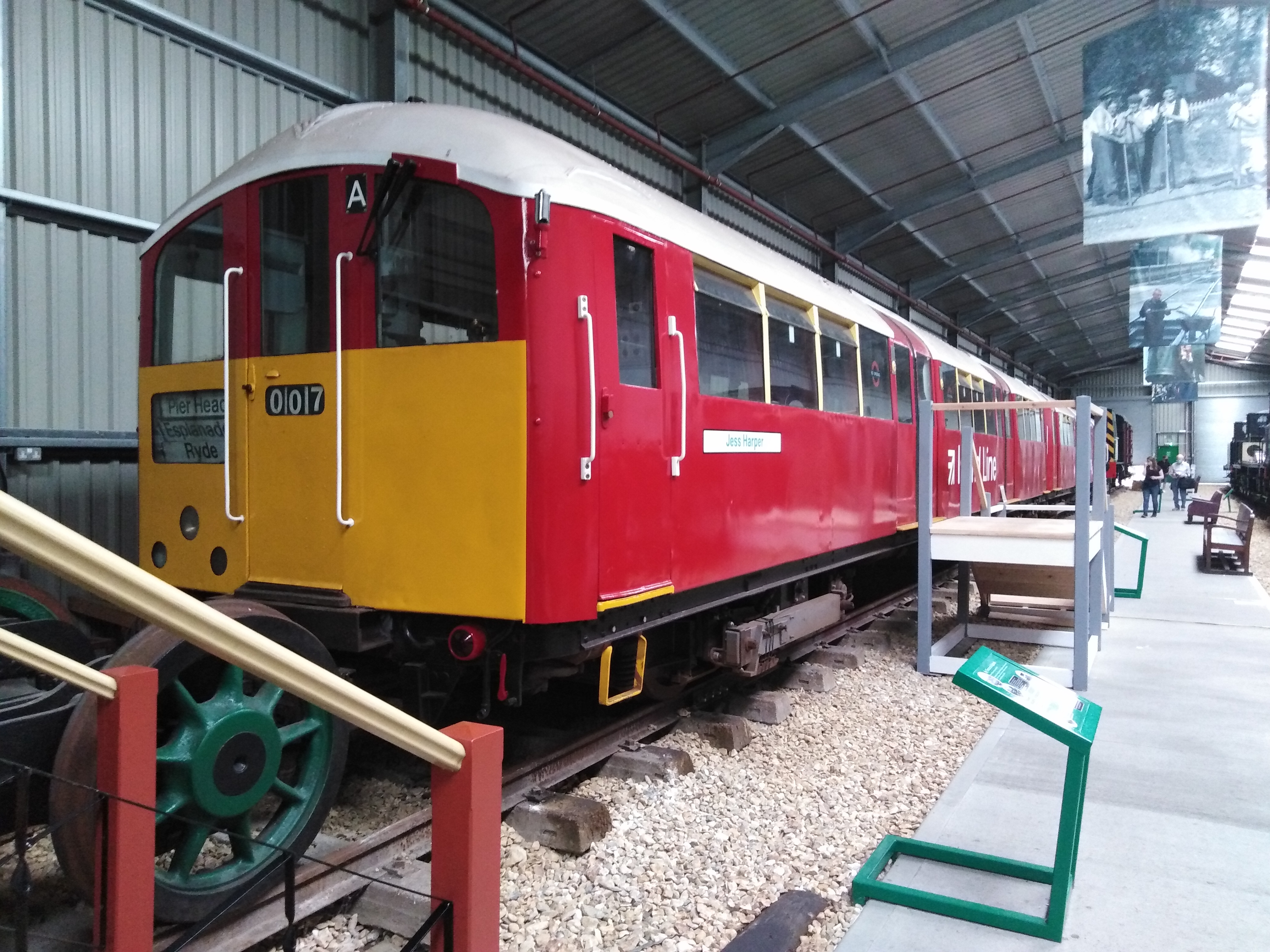
483007 Jess Harper post-withdrawal, preserved at the Isle of Wight Steam Railway's Train Story exhibit.

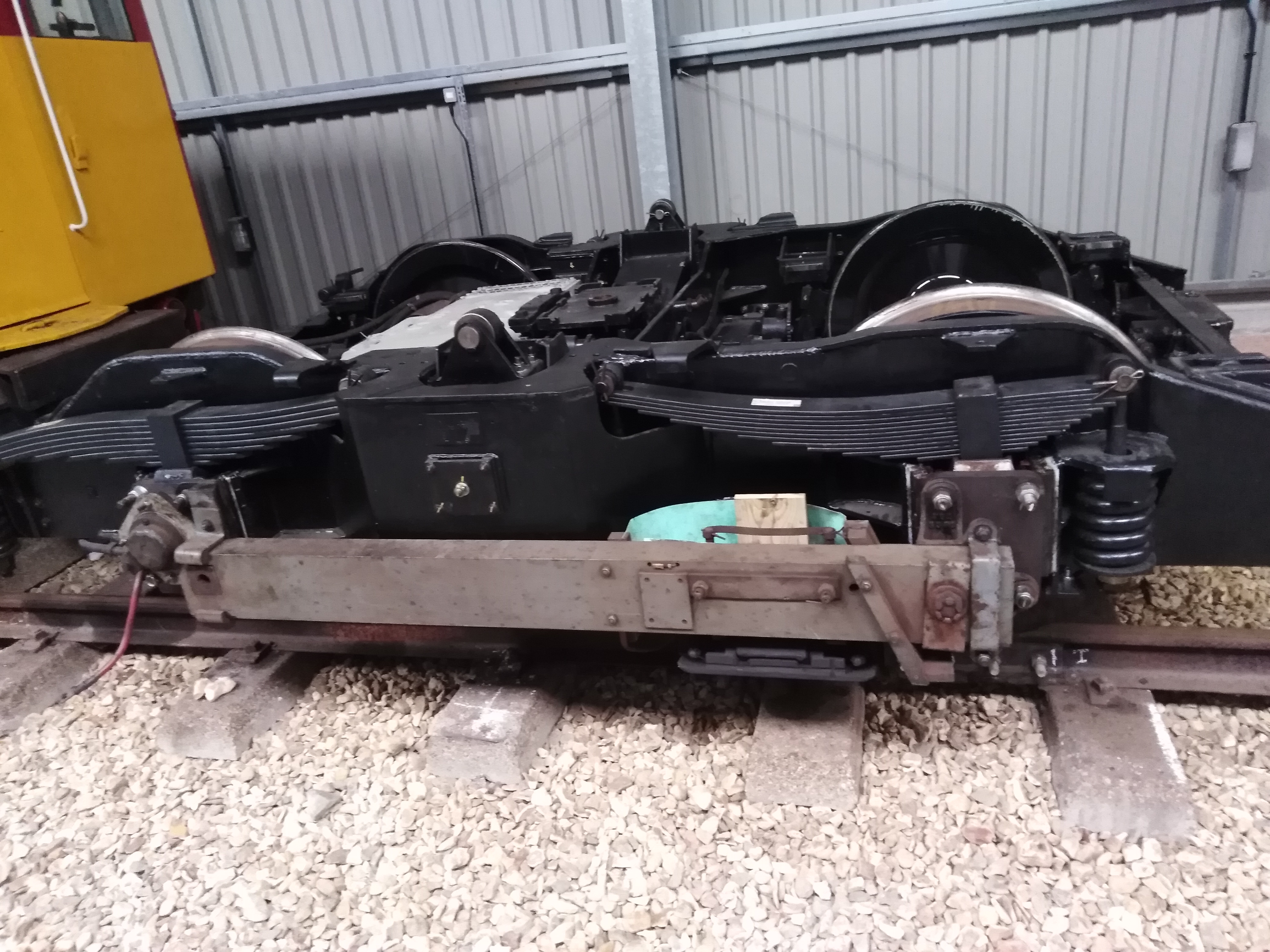
Bogie of a British Rail Class 483 at the Isle of Wight Steam Railway's Train Story exhibit.
