= RYR =

RYR, RyR or Ryr may refer to

- Robert Yates Racing, a NASCAR NEXTEL Cup and Busch Series racing team
- Ryanodine receptor, a class of intracellular calcium channels
- RYR, the ICAO code for Ryanair, an Irish low cost airline
- RYR, the National Rail code for Ryde St John's Road railway station on the Isle of Wight, UK
