= British Rail Class 484 =

Electric multiple unit passenger train

British Rail Class 484 D-Train
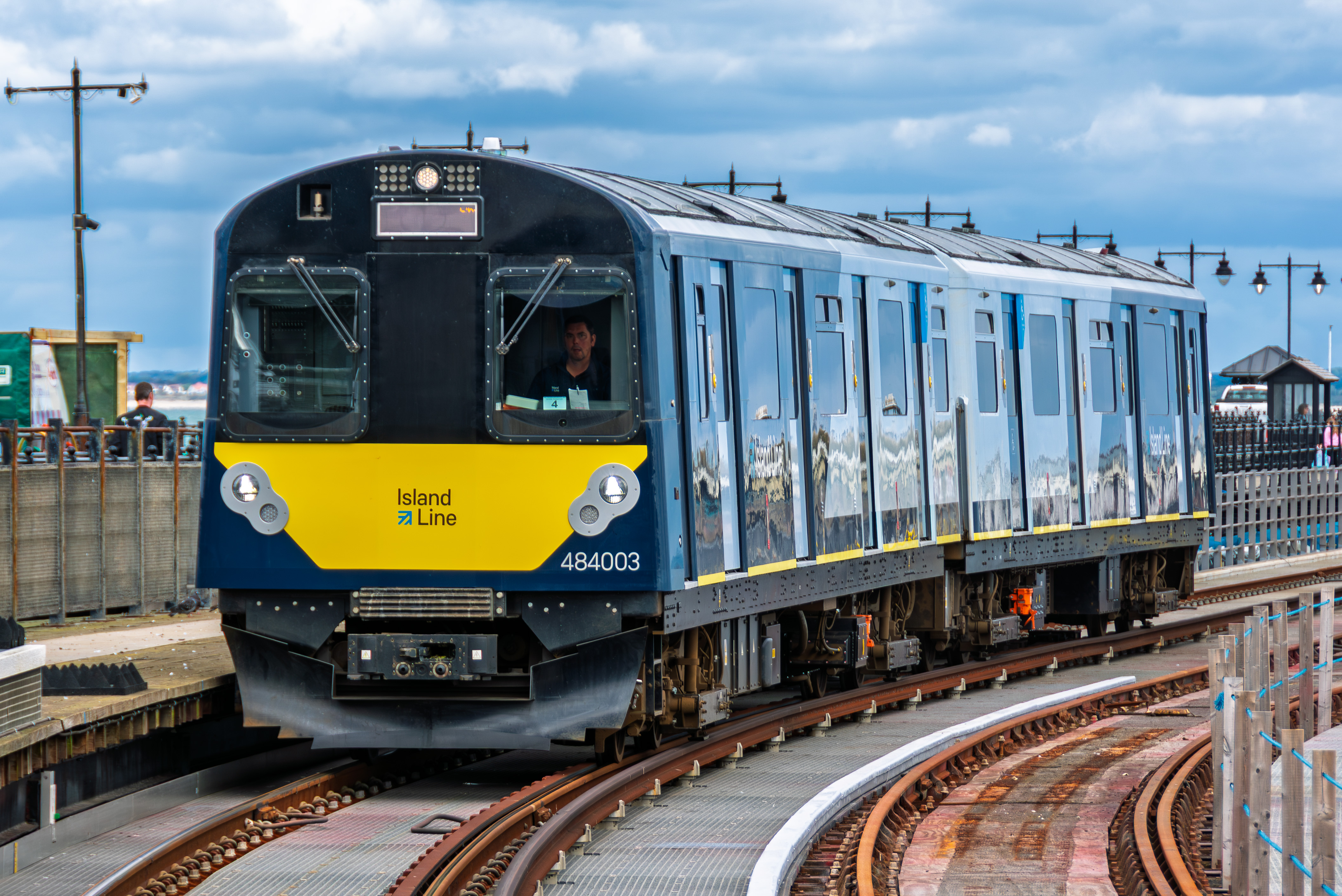
- Island Line Class 484 at Ryde Esplanade

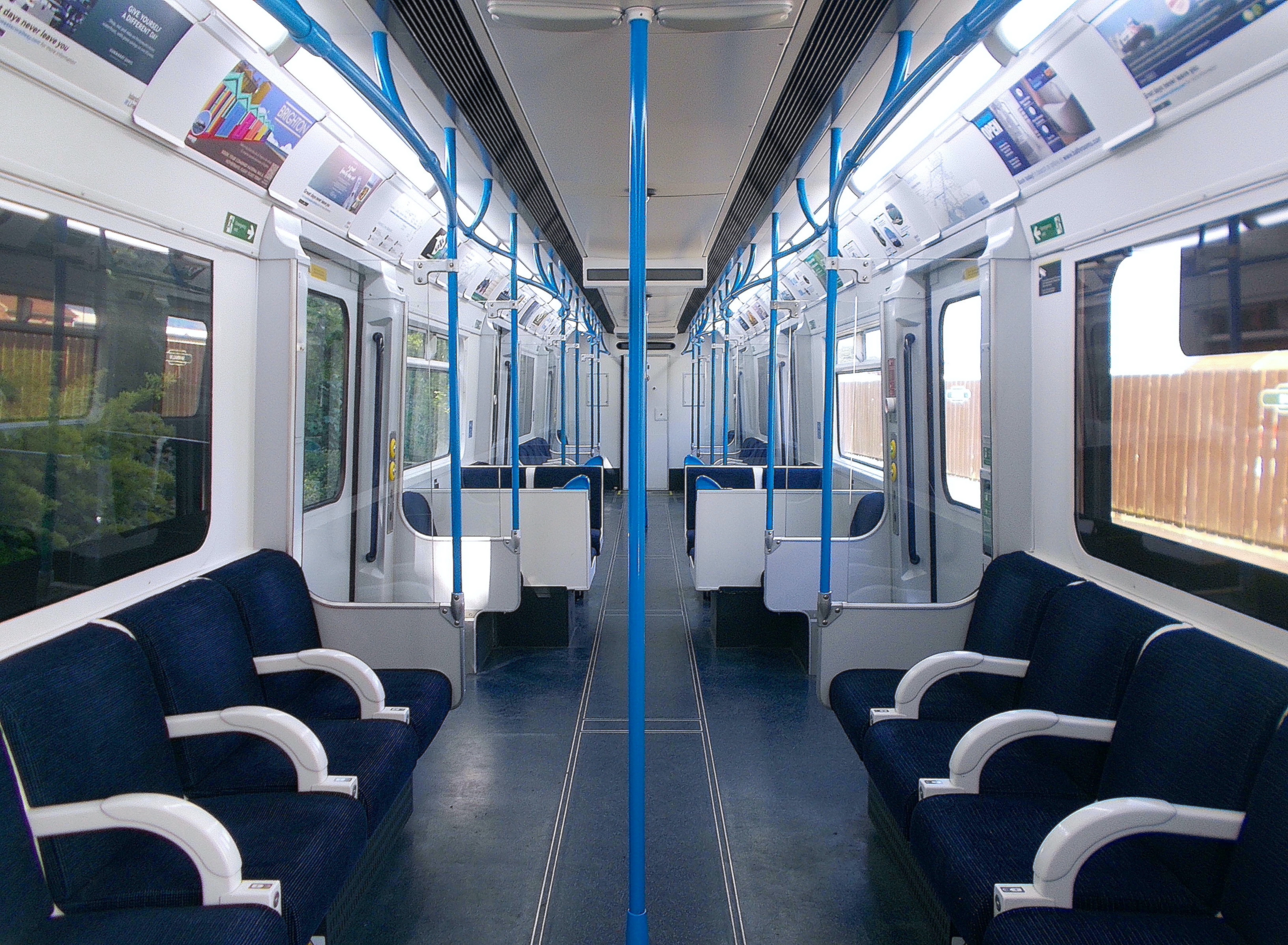
- Class 484 passenger saloon
- In service: 1 November 2021 – present
- Manufacturers: Metro-Cammell (as D78 Stock); Vivarail (conversion)
- Family name: D-Train
- Replaced: Class 483
- Constructed: 2020–2021
- Number built: 5
- Number in service: 5
- Formation: 2 cars per unit
- Fleet numbers: 484001–484005
- Operator: Island Line
- Depot: Ryde
- Line served: Island Line, Isle of Wight

Specifications
- Car body construction: Aluminium
- Train length: 37.304 m (122 ft 5 in) over couplers
- Car length: 18.652 m (61 ft 2 in) over couplers
- Width: 2.840 m (9 ft 4 in)
- Height: 3.630 m (11 ft 11 in)
- Doors: Single-leaf sliding pocket (each 1.127 m (3 ft 8 in) wide)
- Wheel diameter: 790–710 mm (31.10–27.95 in) (new–worn)
- Wheelbase: Bogies: 2.200 m (7 ft 3 in); Bogie centres: 11.885 m (39 ft 0 in)
- Maximum speed: Design: 60 mph (97 km/h); Service limit: 45 mph (72 km/h)
- Traction motors: 8 × Traktionssysteme Austria TME 32-43-4 56 kW (75 hp)
- Power output: 448 kW (601 hp)
- Electric systems: 750 V DC third rail
- Current collection: Contact shoe
- UIC classification: Bo′Bo′+Bo′Bo′
- Bogies: Bombardier
- Braking system: Electro-pneumatic
- Coupling system: Wedglock
- Multiple working: Within class
- Track gauge: 1,435 mm (4 ft 8 1/2 in) standard gauge

The British Rail Class 484 D-Train is a class of electric multiple unit built by rolling stock manufacturer Vivarail which operates on the Island Line on the Isle of Wight. Based on the British Rail Class 230 diesel multiple unit, the units are part of the Vivarail D-Train family, converted from London Underground D78 Stock originally manufactured in the late 1970s and early 1980s by Metro-Cammell.

Five units have been converted for the Island Line to replace the Class 483 sets, with the first delivered for testing in late 2020 and the second in May 2021. The line closed in January 2021 for upgrade works and was originally scheduled to reopen on 1 April 2021 with the new fleet of trains, but delayed infrastructure work as a result of the COVID-19 pandemic extended the shutdown period by six weeks to 13 May 2021, and then problems with software on the trains further delayed their introduction. The line reopened to passengers using the Class 484 stock on 1 November 2021.

== History ==
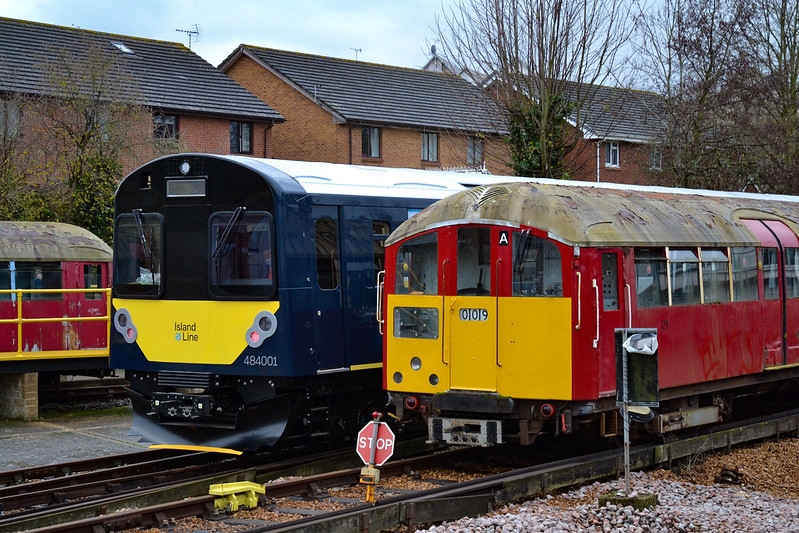
Class 484 484001 alongside Class 483 483009 at Ryde Traincare Depot, showing the difference in size and loading gauge between the two units.

The Island Line, an 8 1/2-mile (13.7 km) long rail route on the Isle of Wight between Ryde and Shanklin, has historically been limited in the type of rolling stock that can be operated due to clearance issues, particularly height of the Ryde Tunnel between Ryde Esplanade and Ryde St John's Road, which has had its trackbed raised numerous times over the course of its history to mitigate the risk of flooding.

These limitations continued even after electrification in 1966. Since electrification, the Island Line has used repurposed former London Underground stock, beginning with the British Rail Classes 485 and 486, built as 1923 tube stock, which were used from 1966 to 1989. Gauging trials took place in the 1960s to determine whether Class 503 units were suitable for use on the route, but without success. From 1989 onward, rail services were operated using Class 483 units, which originated as 1938 tube stock and last ran on the Northern line.

However, these units were first introduced on the Underground in 1938 and, by 2019, were more than eighty years old. This made them increasingly difficult to maintain, with the original fleet of eight eventually reduced to four in service, with another two retained as spares donors. As a consequence, replacement of the rolling stock became an urgent priority. This requirement was eventually linked with a wider need to invest in improvements in the line itself, and saw suggestions that it might be converted to a light rail operation, or even a bus rapid transit route.

However, in 2019, it was announced that the existing third rail operation would be retained, with a total of £26m invested to make improvements. A significant proportion of this would be used on the procurement of a fleet of new trains, which it was announced would be sourced from Vivarail's D-Train platform.

The first passenger-carrying Class 484 departed Ryde St John's Road railway station at 05:35 on 1 November 2021.

== Design ==
The Class 484 units are two-car trains built using the existing bodyshells and bogies of former London Underground D78 stock units modified for use on the National Rail network. These have similar features to the Class 230 trains from the same family, with Wi-Fi, power sockets and CCTV. The D78 Stock is similar in terms of height to other National Rail rolling stock in Great Britain and taller than the previous Class 483, and having undertaken a survey of the route, Vivarail confirmed that its proposed units were capable of traversing the Ryde Tunnel.

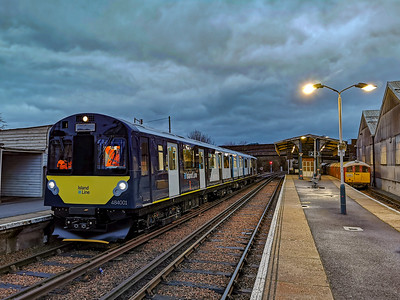
Class 484 stands at Ryde St John's Road

The first of the total of five units was due to be delivered for testing in the summer of 2020. The first unit arrived on the Isle of Wight on 19 November 2020 via ferry.

== Fleet details ==
Each unit is formed of two Driving Motor vehicles.

Unit details
Class	Operator	Qty.	Year converted	Cars per unit	Unit numbers
484	Island Line	5	2020–2021	2	484001–484005

Vehicle numbers
Unit	North end vehicle	South end vehicle
484001	131 (ex 7086)	231 (ex 7011)
484002	132 (ex 7068)	232 (ex 7002)
484003	133 (ex 7051)	233 (ex 7083)
484004	134 (ex 7074)	234 (ex 7111)
484005	135 (ex 7124)	235 (ex 7093)

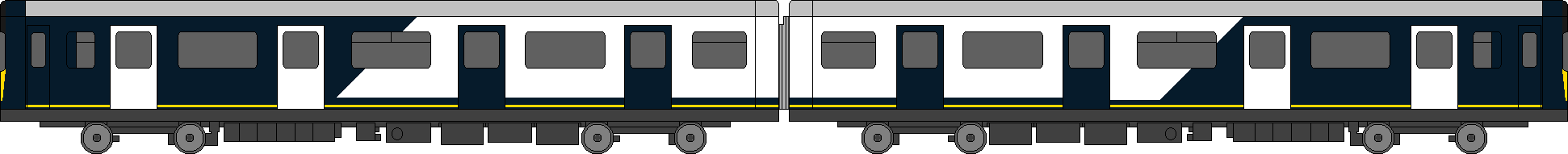
Class 484 diagram

== See also ==
- British Rail Class 230
- Vivarail
