= Island Line (brand) =

Brand of South Western Railway operating railway services on the Isle of Wight

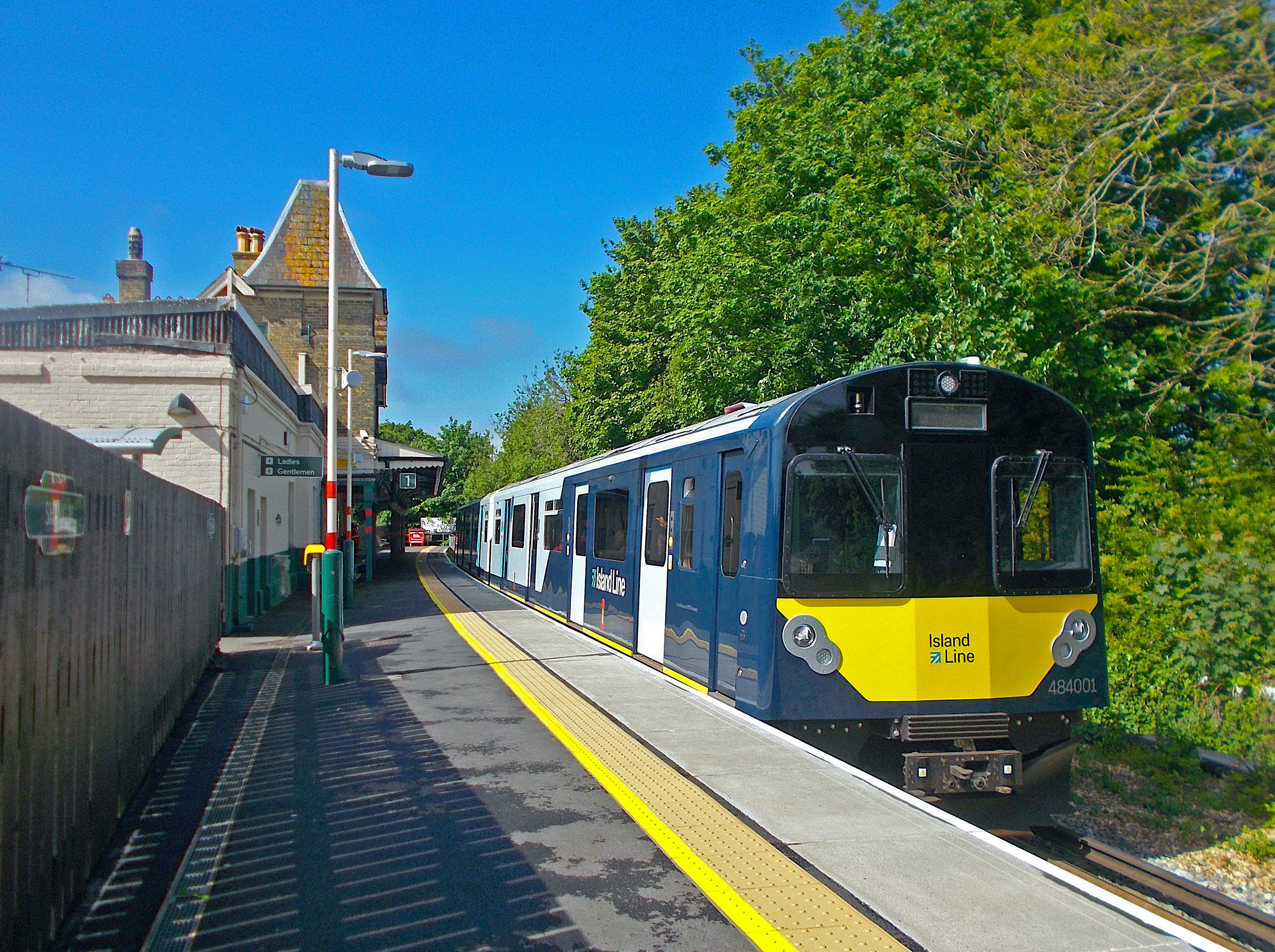
- An Island Line Class 484 at Shanklin

Overview
- Franchises: Island Line; 13 October 1996 – 3 February 2007; Part of South Western franchise 4 February 2007 – 24 May 2025
- Main area: Isle of Wight
- Fleet: 5
- Stations called at: 8
- Parent company: South Western Railway
- Reporting mark: IL

Other
- Website: www.southwesternrailway.com/destinations-and-offers/island-line

Branding until August 2017

Former logo of Island Line

Island Line is a brand of South Western Railway which runs the 8.5-mile (13.7 km) Island Line on the Isle of Wight. A stand-alone franchise from 1996 until 2007, it then became part of the South Western franchise operated by South West Trains until August 2017, and by South Western Railway (First/MTR) from 2017 to 2025. Since 25 May 2025, it is operated by state-owned train operating company South Western Railway.

== History ==
=== Before Island Line ===
From 1985 to 1990 rail services on the Isle of Wight operated under the brand RydeRail. In 1986 Network SouthEast was created, itself part of British Rail, and RydeRail was incorporated into it as a sub-brand.

=== Island Line ===
The name Island Line first came into use in 1989, when Class 483 trains were introduced on the route, and this new brand name and a logo were included on the trains' livery. However, this re-branding did not officially occur until 1994, when it had completely replaced all RydeRail branding.

From 1989 until 1996, Island Line was a sub-brand of Network SouthEast. In 1996, services on the line were privatised as the Island Line franchise, with the winning bid from Stagecoach (legal name Island Line Limited). On commencing operations on 13 October 1996, the name Island Line for the passenger service was retained.

Island Line was the only passenger franchise that included maintenance of the infrastructure in addition to the running of passenger services. Network Rail and its predecessors have continued to own the infrastructure, but lease this out to the operator who is therefore responsible for everyday maintenance of the track and immediate foundations.

While trains have never served Ventnor at any time since the Island Line brand was brought in, several attempts have been made to encourage use of the train to reach the former terminus. A dedicated rail-link feeder bus was introduced in 2004, operating on a direct route between Shanklin and Ventnor, but this was withdrawn in September 2010 after decisions by the Isle of Wight Council about the funding of Wightbus. However, connections and through ticketing have since been provided on the regular bus service, which was slightly diverted to serve the main station entrance. These arrangements continue to be advertised in the rail timetable.

The Island Line franchise was, until February 2007, the smallest train operating company on the National Rail network. It was combined with the South West Trains franchise to form the new South Western franchise in an effort to reduce the number of train operating companies.

Although South West Trains operated the line thereafter, the Island Line branding was retained. Island Line Trains repainted all their stations in a heritage cream and green colour scheme, as part of a general station improvement package.

=== Operations under South Western Railway ===
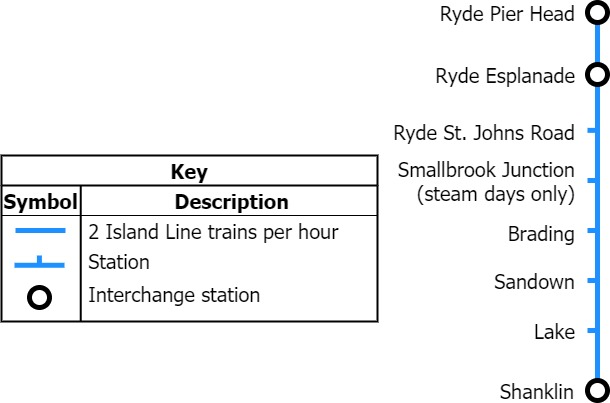
Island Line services map

In March 2017, the DfT awarded the franchise to a FirstGroup / MTR consortium with South Western Railway, which includes the Island Line, commencing on 20 August 2017. It ran until 25 May 2025. South Western Railway worked with the local council and bodies with regards to upgrading the line and adding an additional passing loop to introduce a 30-minute service. These expected changes were received favourably by the Keep Island Line in Franchise (KILF) group.

== Rolling stock ==
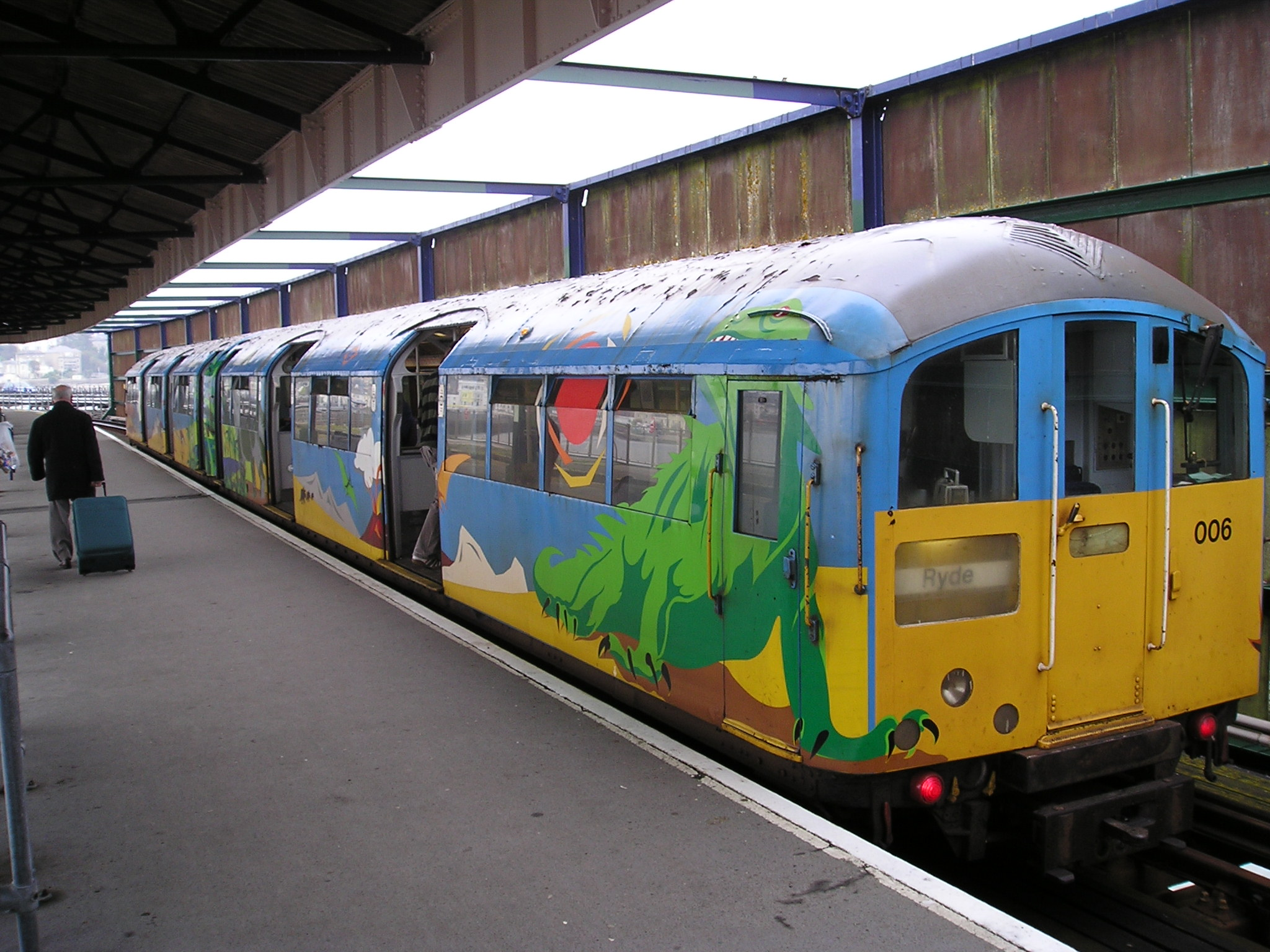
Island Line train in dinosaur livery

Standard National Rail vehicle types cannot be used on the Island Line, due to the low ceiling within Ryde Tunnel, where the track-bed needed to be raised following flooding. Instead, services are operated using Class 484 units, which are refurbished ex-London Underground tube trains originally built in 1978. These recently replaced the older Class 483 which in turn had replaced the Class 485 units, which dated from 1923 and were introduced to the island in 1967 when the line was electrified. The Class 483 trains entered service on the island in 1989, originally painted in the standard Network SouthEast livery, and were replaced by the Class 484 trains in regular passenger service in 2021.

South West Trains bought the stock outright from the leasing company HSBC Rail in March 2007 for the nominal sum of £1. The purchase meant that the leasing costs, which were reimbursed by the government, were eliminated, thereby lowering the line's tax burden.

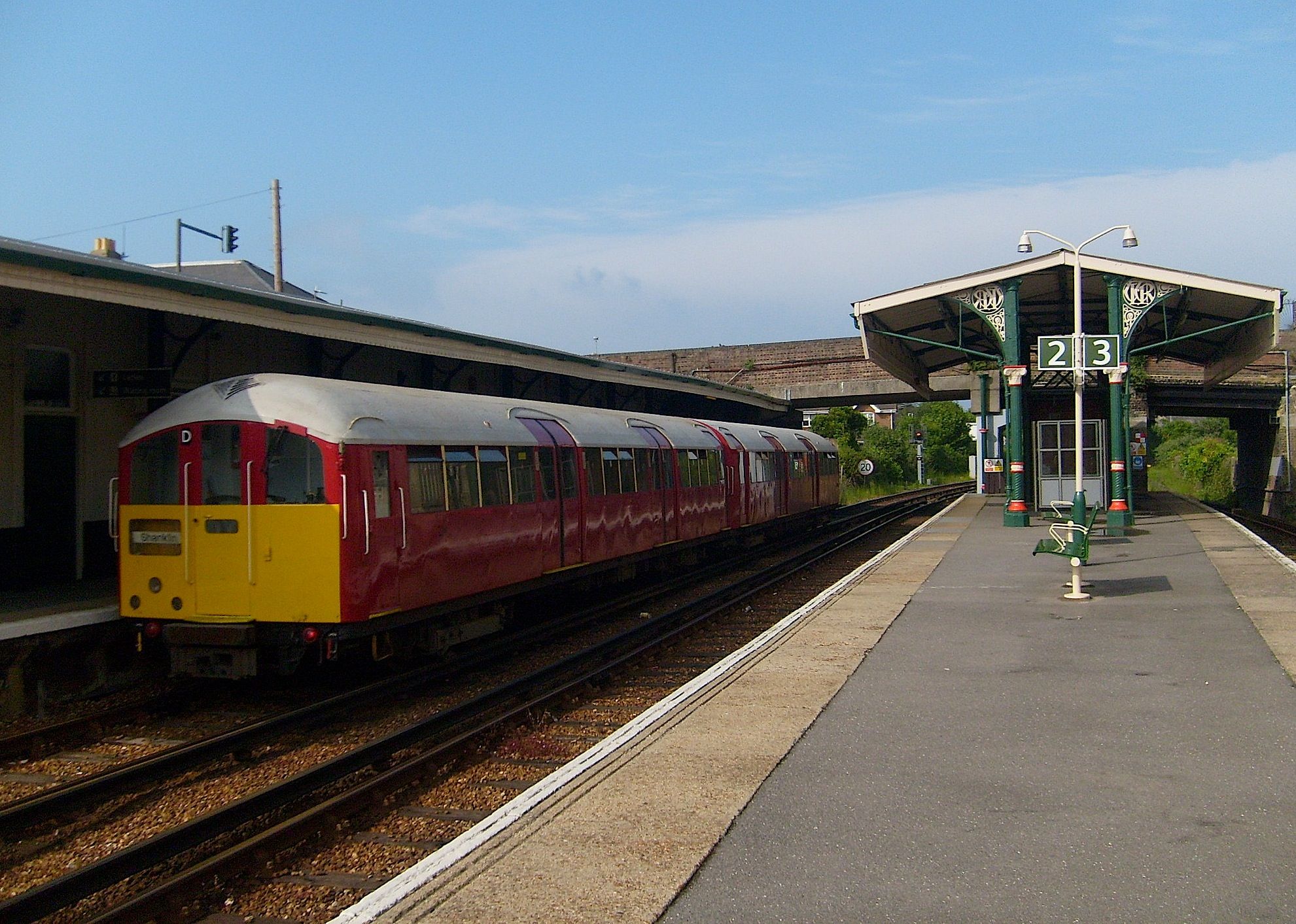
Island Line Class 483 at Ryde St John's Road station

The rolling stock operate in the former London Regional Transport livery, which the units would have had when operating on the London Underground. Two units first received this livery in 2000, when the rest were painted in a blue livery with pictures of dinosaurs aiming to entice tourists in the summer months when passenger numbers are high. A modern change is that there are yellow warning panels on the front ends of the units, required for the safety of track workers and a change compared with the original red. The livery was introduced as part of a refurbishment completed between 2007 and 2008, which also included work at all stations. Rolling stock also received the same seat moquette that the London Underground A60 and A62 Stock received during their refurbishment between 1993 and 1998, and interior route maps in green. Stations also received new tarmac platforms, green and cream painted seating, new waiting shelters and 'heritage' style station name boards.

In September 2019, South Western Railway announced the Class 483s would be replaced by five two-car Class 484s in 2020. The first Class 484 unit, 484001, arrived on the Isle of Wight on 19 November 2020. The final unit, 484005, was delivered on 16 February 2022 and was moved to Ryde Traincare Depot on 28 February of the same year.

=== Current fleet ===
Class	Image	Top Speed	Entered service	Number
Class 484		45	1 November 2021	5

=== Past fleet ===
Class	Image	Top Speed	Time in service	Number
Classes 485 and 486		45 mph	1966–1992	12
Class 483		45 mph	1989–2021	10

== Route ==
The railway has eight stations:

- Ryde Pier Head
- Ryde Esplanade
- Ryde St John's Road
- Smallbrook Junction
- Brading
- Sandown
- Lake
- Shanklin

Preceded by Network SouthEast; As part of British Rail	Operator of Island Line franchise 1996–2007	Succeeded by South West Trains; South Western franchise
Preceded by Island Line Trains; Island Line franchise	Sub-brand of South Western franchise 2007–2017	Succeeded by South Western Railway (2017–2025)
Preceded by South West Trains	Sub-brand of South Western franchise 2017–2025	Succeeded by South Western Railway
Preceded by South Western Railway (2017–2025)	Sub-brand of South Western Railway; 2025 – present	Incumbent
