= Ryde Traincare Depot =

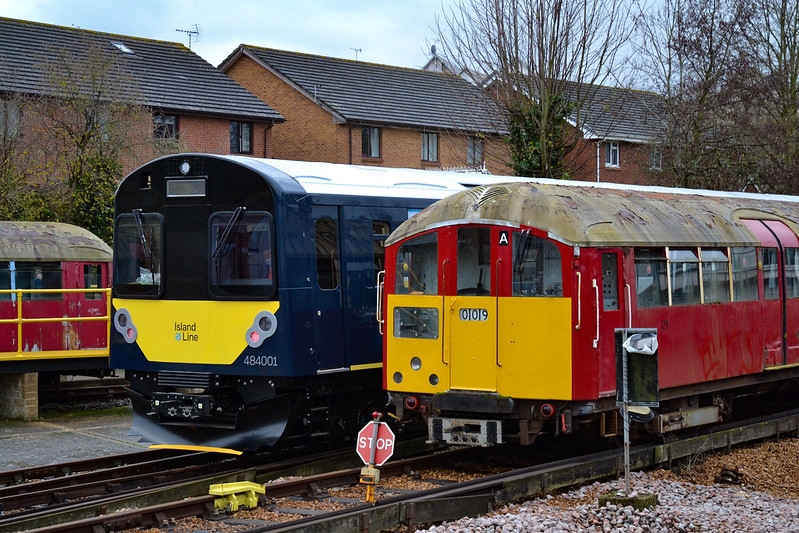
- An Island Line Class 483 and Class 484 at Ryde Traincare Depot in 2020
- Interactive map of Ryde Traincare Depot

Location
- Location: Ryde, Isle of Wight, England
- Coordinates: 50.724°N 1.1565°W
- OS grid: SZ595920

Characteristics
- Operator: Island Line
- Depot code: RY (1973-)
- Type: EMU, Departmental
- Rolling stock: Class 484

History
- Former depot code: 71F (1948-1954); 70H(1954-1973)
- Former rolling stock: Class 483; Class 485 and 486

Ryde Traincare Depot is a railway traction maintenance depot, situated in Ryde, Isle of Wight, to the east of Ryde St John's Road railway station. The depot is operated by Island Line, is allocated the Island Line fleet of the British Rail Class 484s. The depot code is RY.

== Flood risk ==
A stream runs alongside the railway line at this point, and it has flooded parts of the depot on several occasions. The flood in January 1994 damaged two cars of Class 483 stock, while in 1998 trains had to be moved away from the depot to prevent damage. In October 2000, the flooding was extensive and not only damaged four Class 483 units but also washed away ballast at nearby Smallbrook, meaning Island Line Trains had to suspend their services for several days.

== History ==
Before the Island Line was electrified, Ryde depot was home to maintenance works for steam locomotives running on the island's rail network. Steam locos still running on the island are now maintained at the Isle of Wight Steam Railway's works at Havenstreet.

In 1987, the depot had an allocation of Classes 485 and 486 EMUs, as well as Class 97 departmental locomotives.
