= British Rail tube trains =

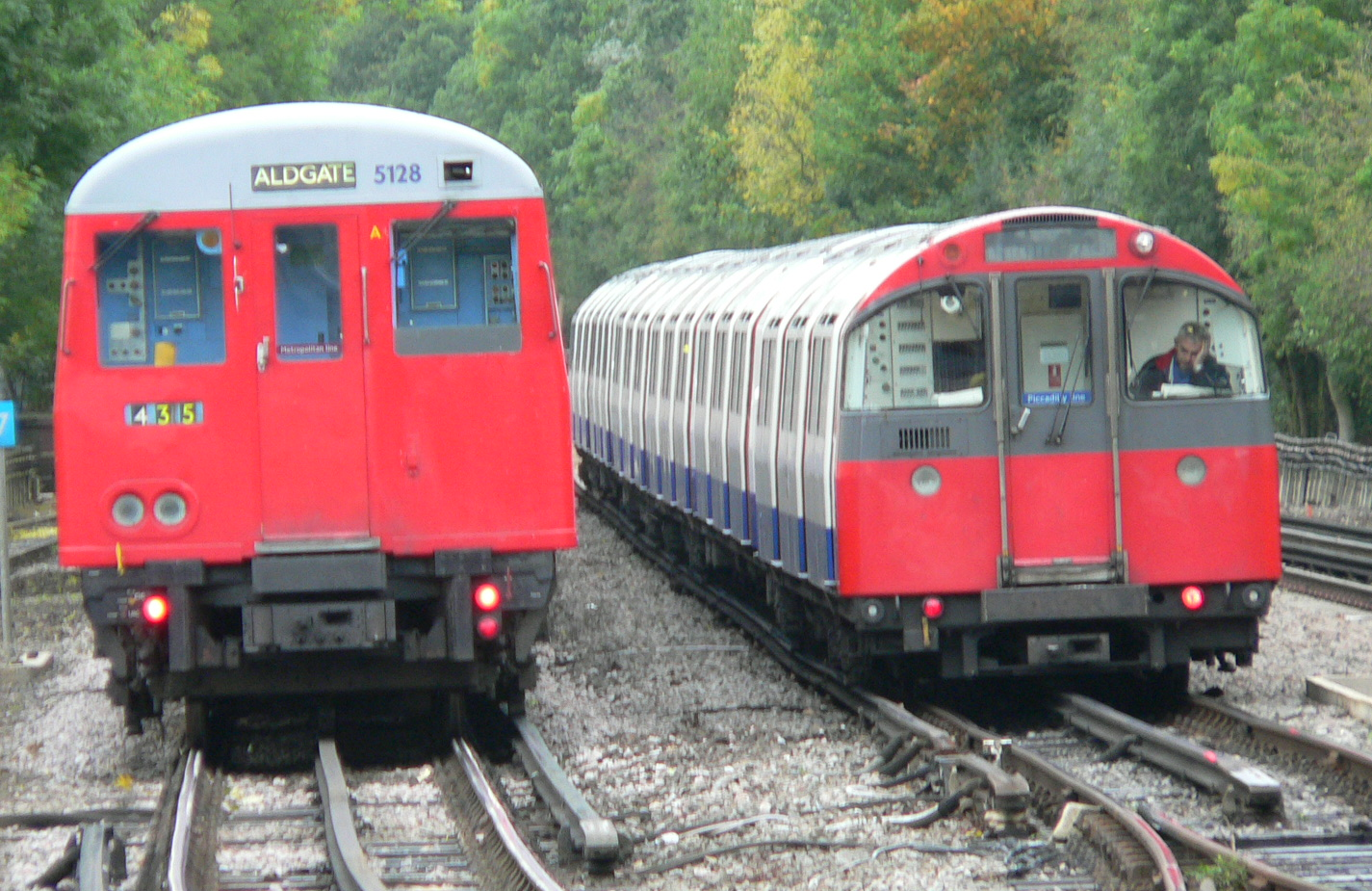
A Metropolitan line train (left) passes a Piccadilly line train (right). The Metropolitan Line train is equivalent to a full-sized train on the national network, while the Piccadilly Line trains shows the size of a "deep-tube" type

Although the railway network in Great Britain has some of the smallest loading gauges in the world, the vast bulk of it is still capable of operating full sized vehicles. However, British Rail, together with its predecessors and successors have, on occasion, been required to operate passenger trains to an even smaller loading gauge and have, as a consequence, obtained rolling stock identical to that of the "deep tube" lines of London Underground; these are lines built using the tunneling shield method, that were, by necessity, smaller than those lines built using the cut-and-cover method. In 1892, a Parliamentary Committee headed by James Stansfeld recommended that such lines be in tunnels with a minimum diameter of 11 ft 6in. Two routes operated by British Rail required the use of such deep-tube rolling stock, the Waterloo & City Line in London, and the Island Line on the Isle of Wight.

== Waterloo & City Line ==
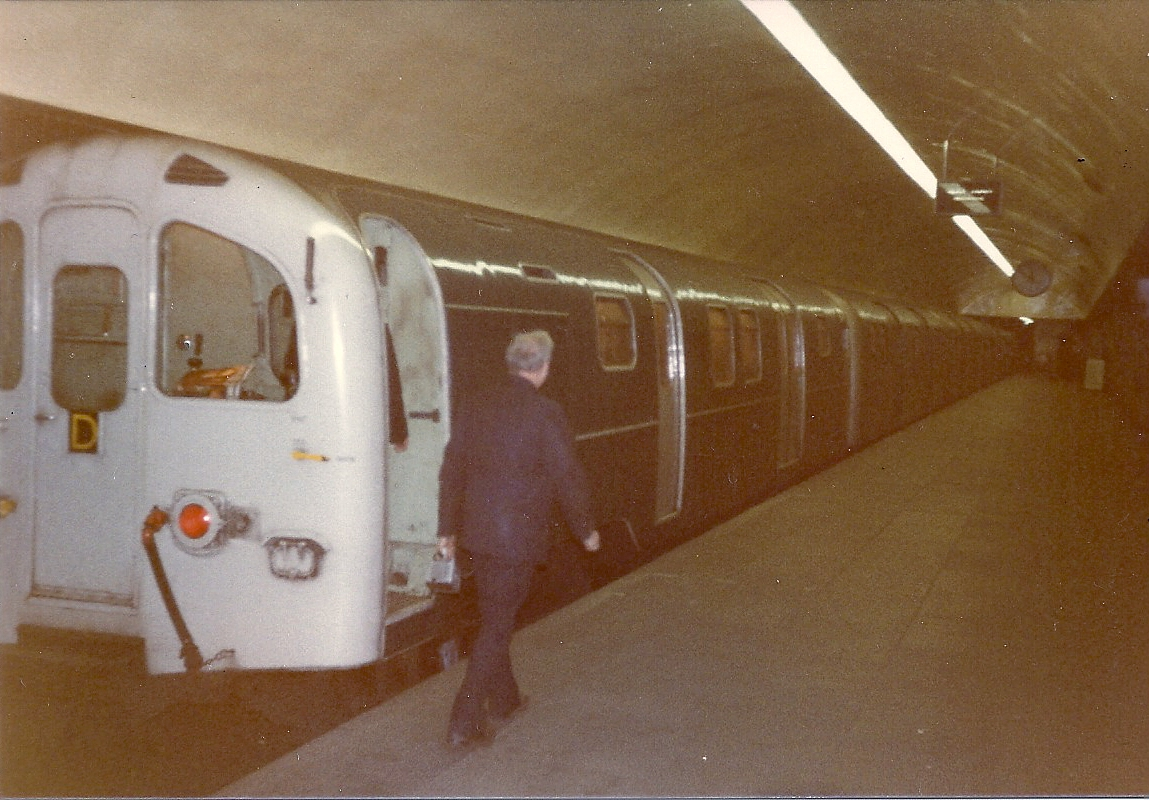
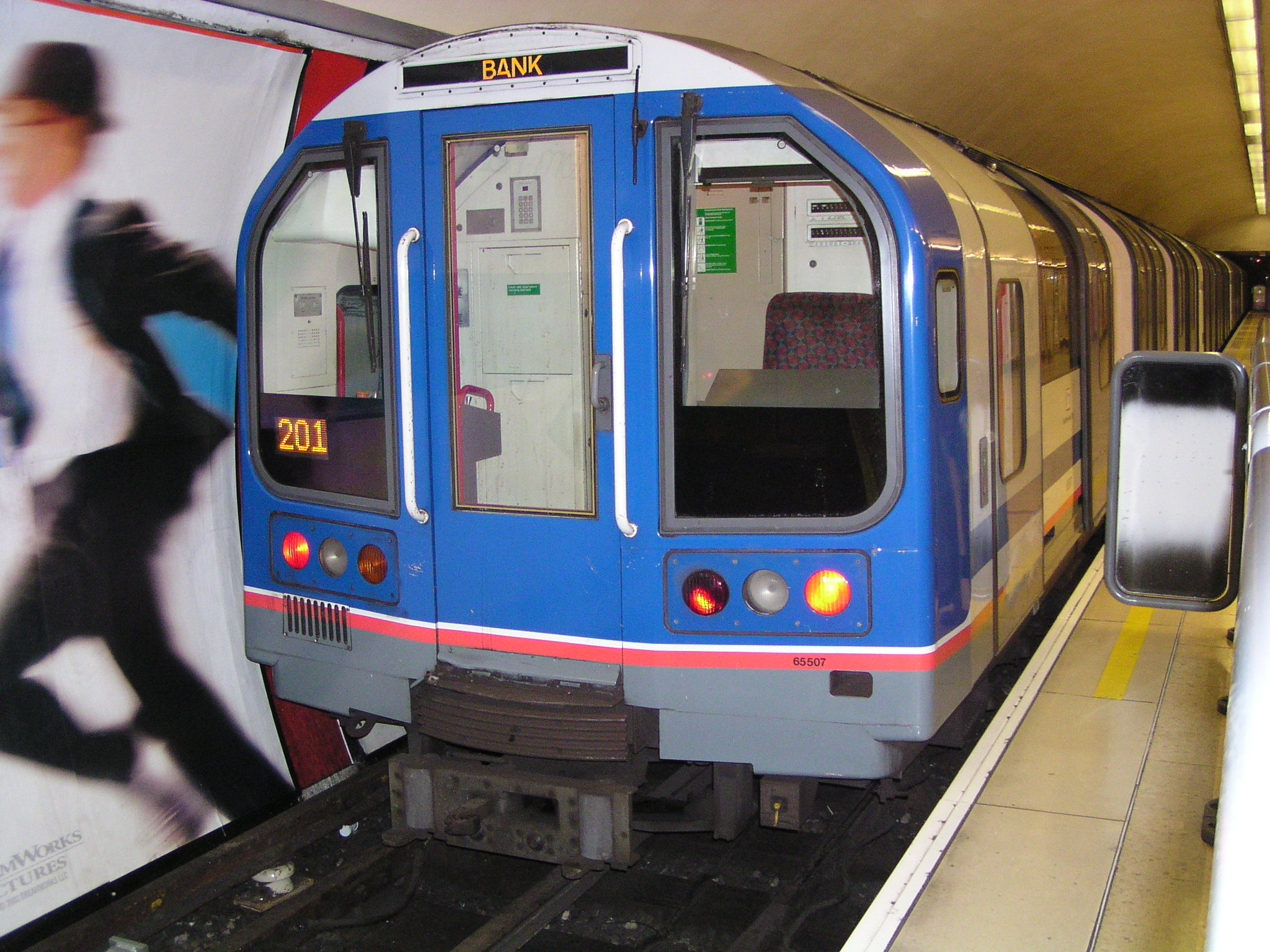
Class 487 (left) and Class 482 (right)

The Waterloo & City line was originally built to serve as a link between the terminus of the London and South Western Railway at Waterloo, on the South Bank of the River Thames, and the City of London. Owing to restrictions on the building of railway lines through the centre of London, it was necessary to build this link as an underground railway, with it becoming London's second deep-tube (after the opening of the City & South London Railway). As a consequence of the diameter of the tunnels (12-foot-1 3/4-inch (3.702 m)), new bespoke trains had to be built which began the service upon its opening in 1898, and continued until 1940.

=== Class 487 ===
In 1937, the management of the Southern Railway, which had responsibility for the Waterloo & City Line, began the process of procuring new rolling stock. Despite the advent of World War II, this was too far advanced to be halted, and the new trains were delivered from the English Electric factory at Preston during 1940, officially entering service on 28 October of that year.

The trains remained in service through the nationalisation of the Southern as part of British Rail in 1948, when the Waterloo & City became part of the Southern Region, and then "Sectorisation" as part of the London & South Eastern sector (renamed "Network SouthEast" in 1986). Under the Total Operations Processing System introduced in the late 1960s, the units were initially classed as Class 453, before being renumbered as Class 487. These trains were finally replaced upon the procurement of 10 new sets in 1993.

=== Class 482 ===
To replace the 1940 vintage rolling stock, Network SouthEast began the process to obtain new trains in mid-1989. Eventually, a decision was taken to purchase ten 2-car sets identical to the new fleet being built to operate on London Underground's Central line. Delivery of the new sets, which were given the TOPS code Class 482, began in early 1993, with the full fleet entering service on 19 July of that year.

In 1994, as part of the process of privatisation of British Rail, the Waterloo & City line, which up to then was the only deep tube line in London not under the control of London Regional Transport, was transferred to the operational control of London Underground, whereupon it became fully part of the Underground network, meaning that following this point the Class 482 units were no longer part of the national network, after which they were referred to as part of LU's fleet of 1992 Stock trains.

== Island Line ==
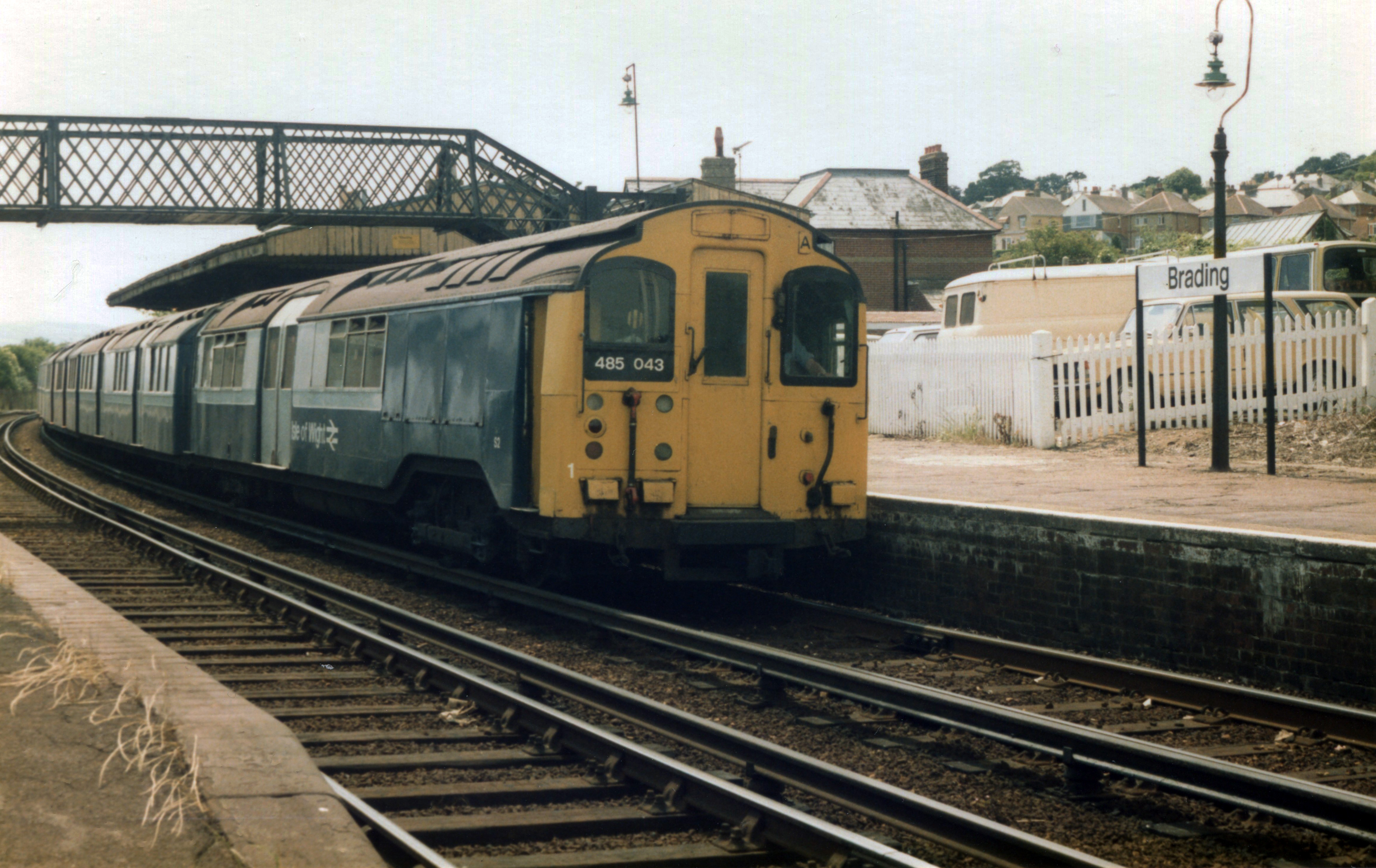
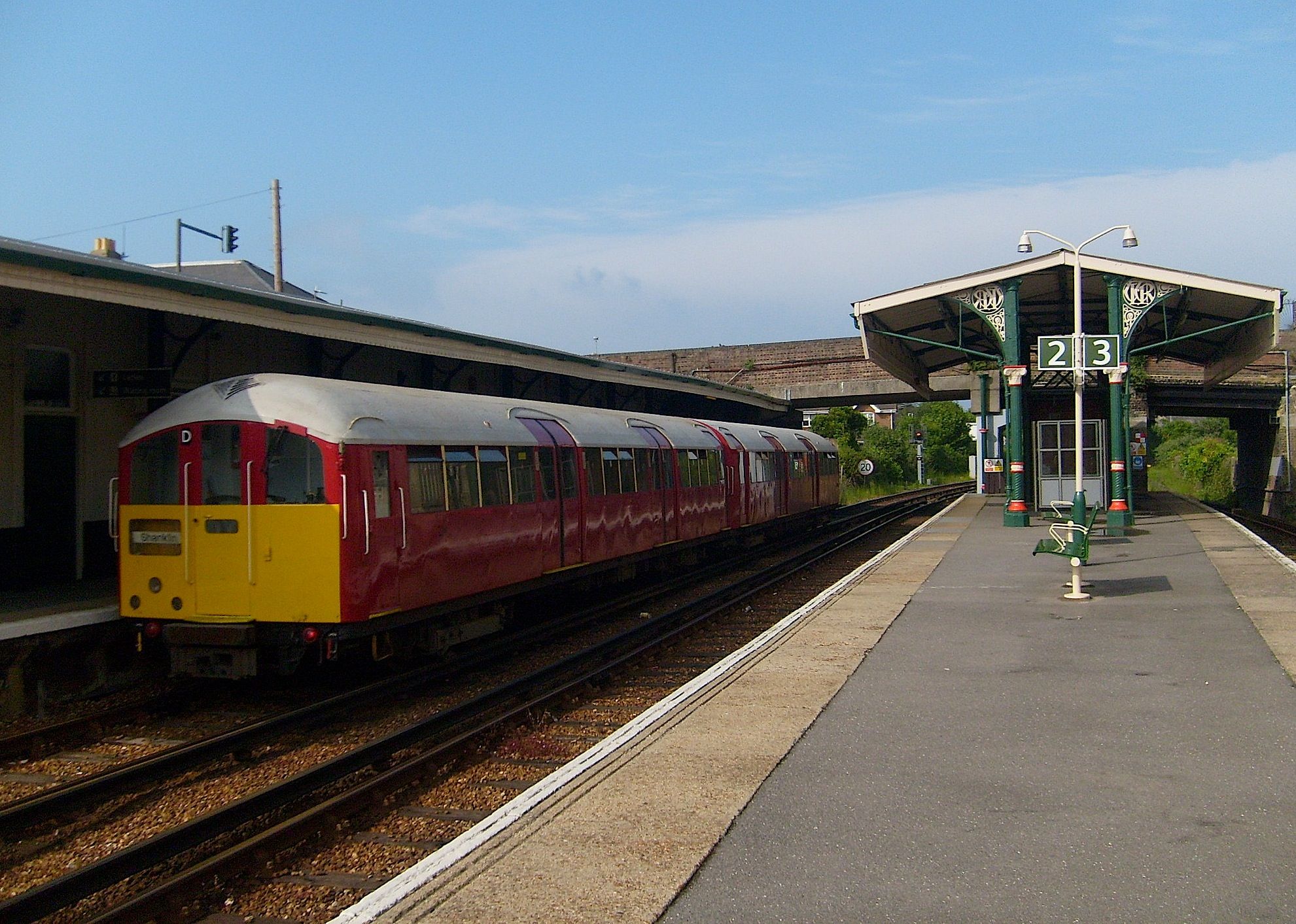
Class 485 (left) and Class 483 (right)

Up until the mid-1960s, the Isle of Wight had an extensive network of railways covering the whole island. However, between 1952 and 1966, all routes except the line between Ryde and Shanklin were closed. This 8 1/2-mile (13.7 km) stretch was closed between January and March 1967 to allow for both the electrification of the entire route, major rebuilding of two stations, and the raising of the trackbed in Ryde Tunnel to reduce the risk of flooding. However, raising the trackbed meant that clearances in the tunnel were below the minimum required for full-sized trains. As a consequence, the Southern Region elected to purchase redundant rolling stock from London Underground, which met the clearance requirements of the tunnel.

=== Class 485 and 486 ===
Upon the electrification of the Ryde-Shanklin route, British Rail purchased a total of 12 units of withdrawn rolling stock from London Underground, formed into six 4-car and six 3-car sets. Initially, it had been planned to convert them into DEMUs, until the electrification plan was agreed on. These units had originally been operated as LU's "Standard" Stock on the Northern, Piccadilly and Bakerloo lines. As a consequence, they needed to be converted to operate on the Southern Region's third rail system. Once this was complete, and the vehicles were fully overhauled, they were shipped to the island, where they entered service on 20 March 1967. Initially, they were given standard Southern Region codes as 4-Vec and 3-Tis. Upon the introduction of TOPS, they were given Class 451 and 452, before finally receiving the classifications Class 485 and 486.

The proximity to the sea led to the units suffering badly from salt corrosion, and by the 1980s it was recognized that they would need replacing urgently. Once the decision was taken to procure replacements, Network SouthEast were offered a number of vehicles of 1938 Stock, then being withdrawn from service on the Northern Line, for use on the island. This eventually saw the Class 485 and Class 486 trains finally withdrawn from service by February 1991.

=== Class 483 ===
Prior to the procurement of what eventually became Class 483, British Rail had considered purchasing redundant vehicles of 1938 Stock for use on the Isle of Wight in 1973, but had not gone through with this plan, owing to the more advanced nature of these units as compared with Standard Stock. The 1938 Stock had its traction equipment along the bottom of each vehicle, which was believed to be vulnerable to salt spray, and which would need significant adaptations to the depot in order to access (the Standard Stock had its traction equipment fitted in a compartment in the Driving Motor vehicles). A total of eight 2-car units of 1938 Stock were overhauled and converted to operate on the Isle of Wight, being given the TOPS code Class 483. The first of these entered passenger service in October 1989, with all being in traffic by July 1990. Two more units, one refurbished for traffic, and another for use as a source of spares, were transported to the island in 1992. Since then, three of the running units have been withdrawn, leaving a total of six available in service. As of January 2021, these were the oldest operating passenger trains on the entire national railway network, having entered service on London Underground in 1938.

In September 2019, it was announced that the remaining Class 483 trains would be replaced beginning in the summer of 2020 by a fleet of five newly procured units. These would be sourced from Vivarail, a company set up to refurbish redundant D78 Stock vehicles, previously used by London Underground on the District line, for use on the National Rail network. Unlike the Class 483s, the new Class 484s would be full-sized trains, it having been determined that the clearances in Ryde Tunnel were adequate for them to be used. The Class 483 units were finally withdrawn from service on 3 January 2021.
