= British Rail Classes 485 and 486 =

Rolling stock used on the Isle of Wight

British Rail Class 485 British Rail Class 486
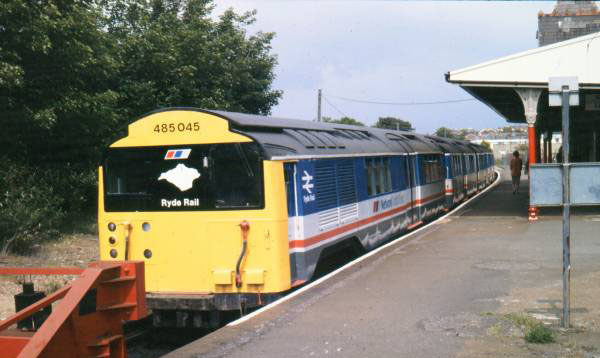
- 485045 at Shanklin.
- In service: 1923 - 1964 on London Underground; 1967 - 1992 on Island Line
- Manufacturers: Metro Cammell, Union Construction Company, Cammell Laird
- Family name: Tube
- Successor: Class 483
- Formation: 4 cars per trainset (4-VEC); 3 cars per trainset (3-TIS); DMBSO+TSO+TSO+DMBSO (4-VEC); DMBSO+TSO+DTSO (3-TIS); 5 cars per trainset (5-VEC from 1985); 2 cars per trainset (2-TIS from 1985); DMBSO+TSO+TSO+TSO+DMBSO (5-VEC from 1985); DMBSO+DTSO (2-TIS from 1985)
- Diagram: EB261 (DMBS, 485, 486); EB262 (DMBS, 485); EE260 (DTS, 485, 486); EH261 (TS, 485, 486)
- Capacity: 132 seats (4-VEC); 106 seats (3-TIS)
- Operator: Network SouthEast

Specifications
- Maximum speed: 45 mph (72 km/h)
- Weight: 94 t (93 long tons; 104 short tons) (4-VEC, set); 65 t (64 long tons; 72 short tons) (3-TIS, set); 32 t (31 long tons; 35 short tons) (MBSO); 19 t (19 long tons; 21 short tons) (TSO); 17 t (17 long tons; 19 short tons) (DTSO)
- Electric system: 660 V DC 3rd rail
- Track gauge: 1,435 mm (4 ft 8 1/2 in) standard gauge

The British Rail Class 485 (or 4Vec, later 5Vec) and British Rail Class 486 (or 3Tis, later 2Tis) electrical multiple units were originally built for the London Electric Railway from 1923-31 as its 'Standard' tube stock. They were purchased by British Rail in 1967 and transported to the Isle of Wight to work 'mainline' services on the newly electrified Ryde to Shanklin line, where they worked for an additional quarter of a century. At the time of their purchase the units had already worked for over 40 years on the London Underground, but their introduction allowed the last steam locomotives on the line to be withdrawn.

== History ==
Six four-car sets and six three-car sets were refurbished by BR's Stewarts Lane depot in 1966-67. The four-car sets were initially classified Class 452 and numbered 041-046, later reclassified Class 485 and numbered 485041-046. Each unit was formed of a driving motor, two intermediate trailers, and a second driving motor. Thus, the formation was DMBSO+TSO+TSO+DMBSO. Some of the intermediate trailers were former driving trailers, with the cabs locked out of use.

The three-car sets were classified Class 451 and numbered 031-036, later reclassified Class 486 and numbered 486031-036. A spare driving motor car was also refurbished, given the unit number 486037. Each of these units were formed of a driving motor, an intermediate trailer, and a driving trailer. Thus, the formation was DMBSO+TSO+DTSO.

When introduced, the units carried all-over BR blue livery. This progressed to standard blue/grey livery in the 1970s, and finally some units received Network SouthEast's blue livery with red and white stripes, following its introduction in 1986.

Electric services on the Isle of Wight commenced on 20 March 1967. In service, the 4Vec units often worked alone, but sometimes in combination with a 3Tis unit, such that a train was formed of seven coaches known as a 7 Vectis. ("Vectis" was the Roman name for the Isle of Wight.)

== Reformation ==
In 1985, the Class 485 units were reformed into five 5 car (5Vec) units, and the Class 486 units into two 2 car (2tis) units.

== Withdrawal ==
Due to the proximity to the sea, the units suffered badly from corrosion damage. By the mid-1980s it was clear that they needed to be replaced. The replacements came from the two-car Class 483, which were also rebuilt from former London Underground stock, namely 1938 tube stock. These new units were introduced from 1989. The last 2Tis and 5Vec units were withdrawn from service in 1992.

Upon retirement from Isle of Wight services, no 486 units were saved for preservation. However, several 485 vehicles were sold back to London Underground for eventual restoration as part of an operational 'Standard' stock museum unit. These are listed below:

Type	No.	From set	LT no.
DMBSO	2	485041	3706
DMBSO	7	485044	3209
DTSO	27	485043	5279
TSO	44	485044	7281
TSO	49	485044	7296

Of these five cars, only DTSO 5279 and TSO 7296 have been preserved, all the other cars were scrapped in Acton works in 2013 alongside other old Standard Stock Cars. During November 2011 the two long-stored DM vehicles 2 and 7 were despatched by LU to Eastleigh depot for component recovery and subsequent breaking up: this is believed to have occurred in December 2011 (although this has not been confirmed). Trailers 27 and 49 are incorporated into the LT museum's Standard stock museum train. Trailer 44 was scrapped in August 2012.

== Fleet details ==
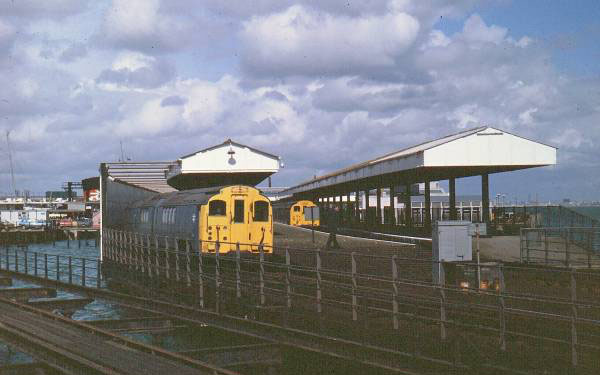
Class 486s at Ryde Pier Head.

Class	Operator	No. Built	Year built	Cars per Set	Unit nos.
Class 485	Southern Region (Island Line); Network SouthEast	6	1923 refurb. 1966	4, later 5	485041–485046
Class 486	Southern Region (Island Line); Network SouthEast	6	1923 refurb. 1966	3, later 2	486031-486036

Class 485 (pre-1985)
Unit no.	Carriage nos.							
Unit no.	DMBSO		TSO		TSO		DMBSO	
Unit no.	IoW	LU	IoW	LU	IoW	LU	IoW	LU
041	20	3308	27 (Note: TSO vehicles which were originally DTSO with the cab locked out of use.)	5279	41	7286	13	3141
042	22	3010	29	5293	42	7280	15 (Note: The original car 15 ex 3253 was scrapped in 1971 and replaced by ex LT 3273, renumbered to 15 II)	3253
043	2	3706	31	5283	43	7275	19	3045
044	4	3702	33	5291	44	7281	21	3041
045	6	3084	45	7293	48	7298	23	3315
046	8	3074	49	7296	46	7283	25	3313

Class 486 (pre-1985)
Unit no.	Carriage nos.					
Unit no.	DMBSO		TSO		DTSO	
Unit no.	IoW	LU	IoW	LU	IoW	LU
031	1	3703	47	7279	26	5294
032	3	3251	92	7285	28	5304
033	5	3185	93	7282	30	5312
034	7	3209	94	7287	32	5290
035	9	3223	95	7292	34	5302
036	11	3705	96	7290	36	5350
Spare	10	3696	–	–	–	–

== Bibliography ==
- Robert, Greenaway (1983), "Metropolitan and Underground Rolling Stock for the Isle of Wight", Underground, no. 11, Hemel Hempstead, Hertfordshire: London Underground Railway Society, p. 48, ISSN 0306-8609
