= Ryde St John's Road railway station =

Railway station on the Isle of Wight, England

Coordinates: 50.724°N 1.157°W

Ryde St John's Road
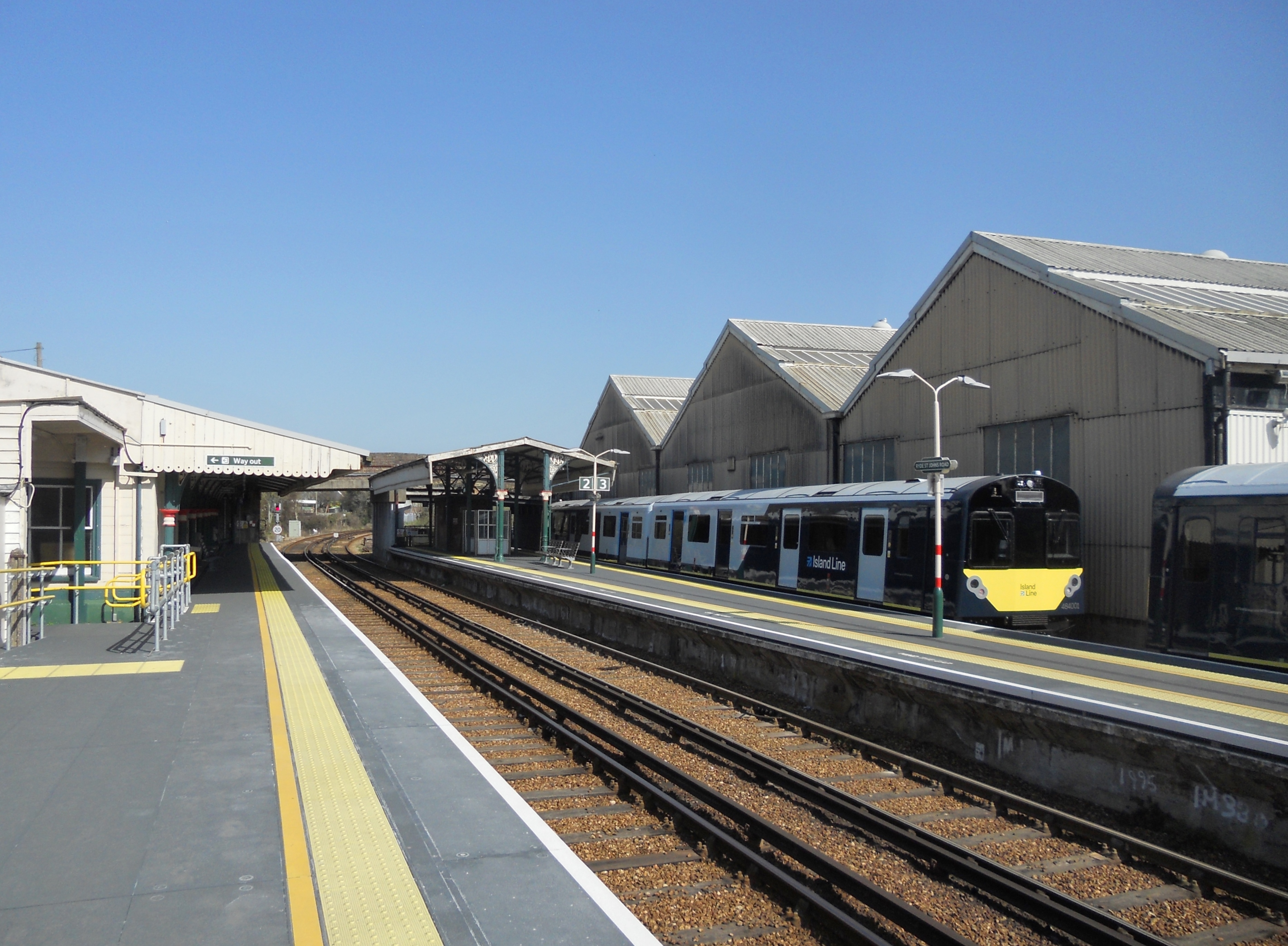

General information
- Location: Ryde, Isle of Wight; England
- Grid reference: SZ596919
- Managed by: South Western Railway
- Platforms: 3

Other information
- Station code: RYR
- Classification: DfT category F2

History
- Original company: Isle of Wight Railway
- Pre-grouping: Isle of Wight Railway
- Post-grouping: Southern Railway

Key dates
- 23 August 1864: Opened as Ryde
- 5 April 1880: Renamed Ryde St John's Road
- 1 January 1967: Closed for electrification
- 20 March 1967: Reopened
- 3 January 2021: Closed for upgrade works
- 1 November 2021: Reopened

Passengers
- 2020/21: ▼21,058
- 2021/22: ▲38,994
- 2022/23: ▲65,396
- 2023/24: ▼57,222
- 2024/25: ▼53,256
Location
Notes
- Passenger statistics from the Office of Rail and Road

Ryde St John's Road is a railway station on the Island Line, and serves the town of Ryde, Isle of Wight. The station is 1.25 mi (2 km) south of Ryde Pier Head—the Island Line's northern terminus.

== History ==
When the station opened in 1864, it was known as Ryde railway station, as it was the northern terminus of the Isle of Wight Railway at the time. Rather than a railway, a tramway continued northwards to where the current Ryde Pier Head railway station stands; the railway was extended to Ryde Pier in 1880.

== Depot and signalling ==
Adjacent to the railway station is Ryde Traincare Depot: the Island Line's traction maintenance depot, where the maintenance and storage of the Island Line's Class 484 trains takes place. Since 1989, signalling for the Island Line has been centralised to the station's signal box.

== Future developments ==
It has been suggested that the Isle of Wight Steam Railway might be extended from Smallbrook Junction to Ryde St John's Road in the future, but there are currently no official proposals.

== Services ==
All services at Ryde St John's Road are operated by Island Line using Class 484 EMUs.

The typical off-peak service in trains per hour is:

- 3 trains per 2 hours to Ryde Pier Head
- 3 trains per 2 hours to Shanklin

These services call at all stations, except Smallbrook Junction, which is served only during operating dates for the Isle of Wight Steam Railway.

Preceding station	Island Line	Following station
Ryde Esplanade towards Ryde Pier Head	Island Line Steam operating days only	Smallbrook Junction towards Shanklin
Ryde Esplanade towards Ryde Pier Head	Island Line	Brading towards Shanklin

== Gallery ==
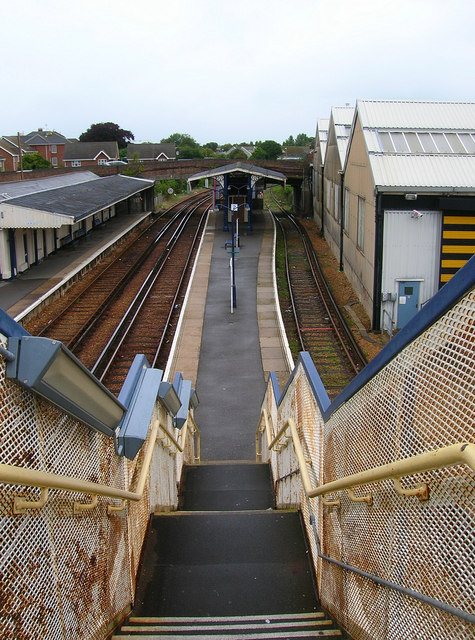
Viewed from the footbridge, looking at platforms 2 and 3, along with the depot building

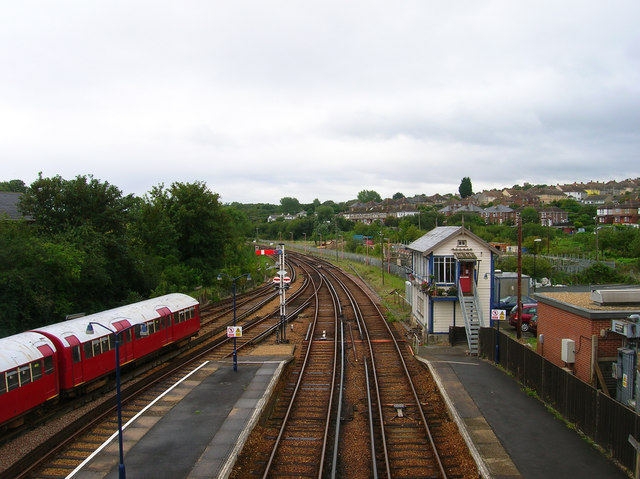
Looking south from the station's old footbridge; the Island Line's signalbox is visible on the right

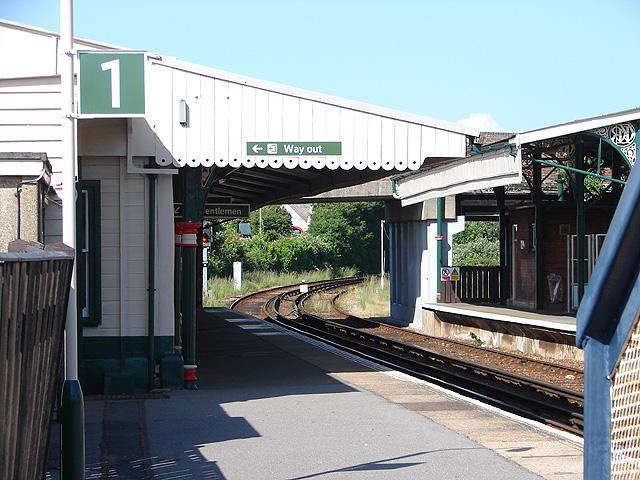
Platform 1, looking towards Ryde tunnel and the northern terminus of the line: Ryde Pier Head

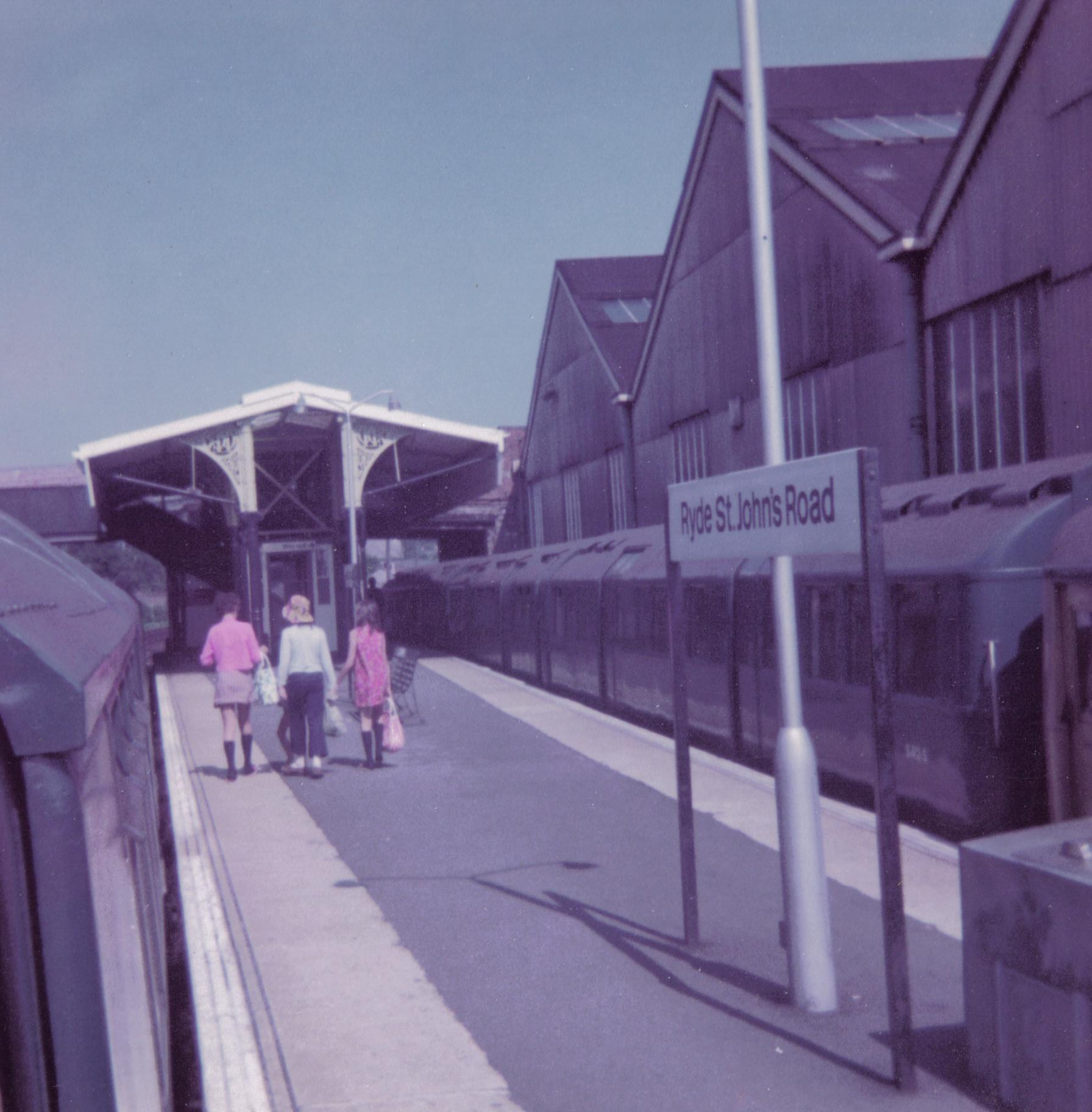
Ryde St John's Road station in 1971

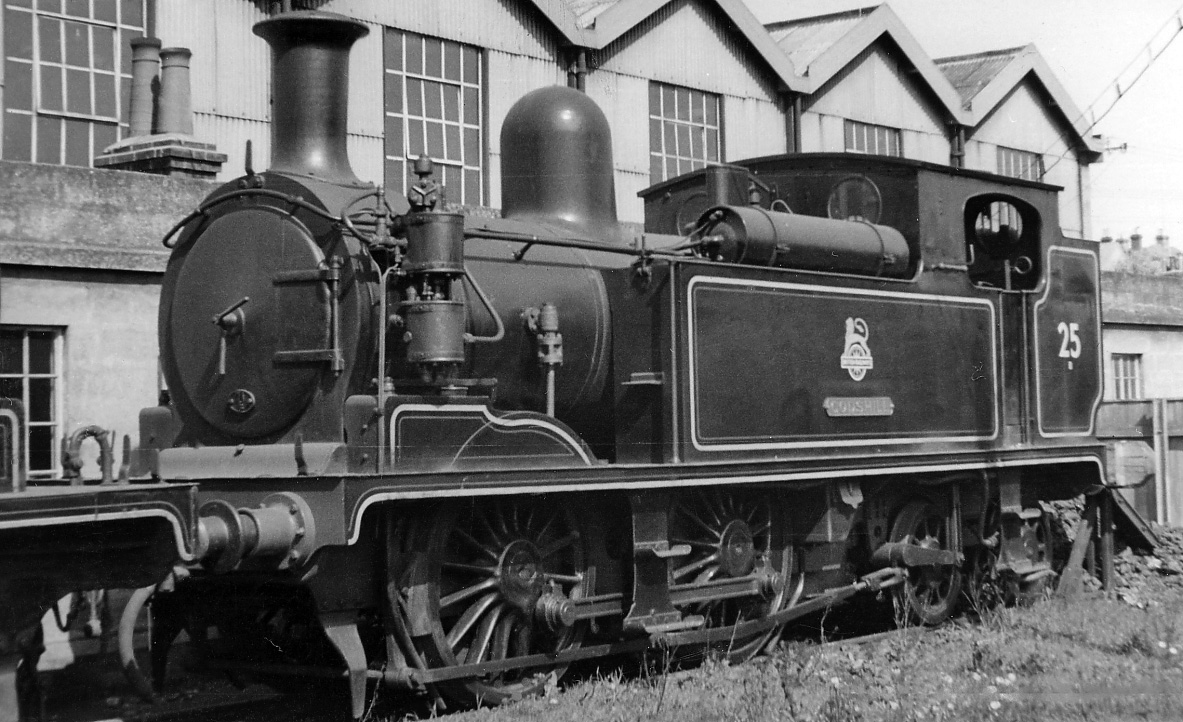
Ex-LSW 0-4-4T outside St John's Road Locomotive Shed in 1954
