= Sandown railway station =

Railway station on the Isle of Wight, England

Coordinates: 50.657°N 1.162°W

Sandown
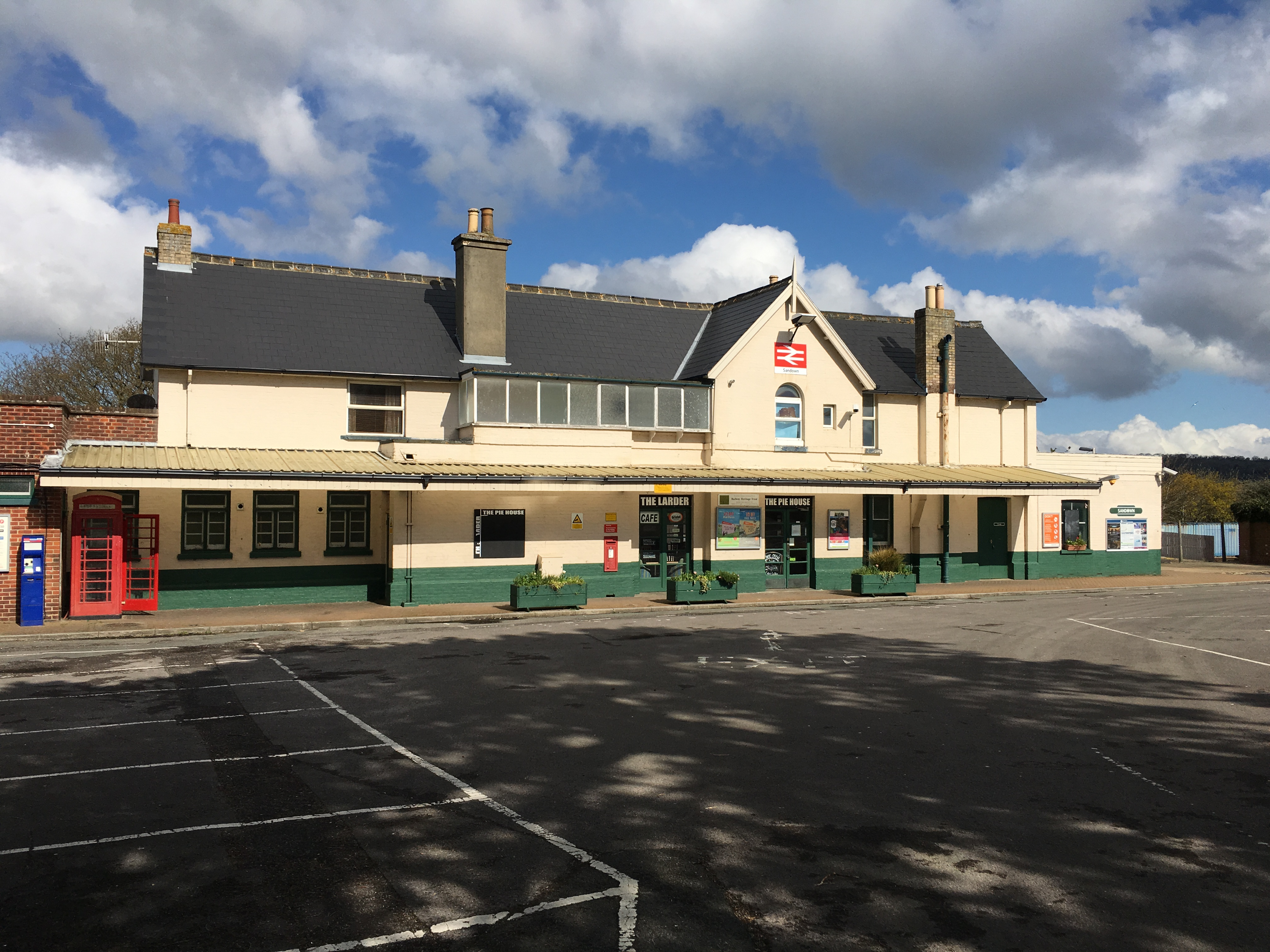
- The station building in 2016

General information
- Location: Sandown, Isle of Wight, England
- Grid reference: SZ593844
- Managed by: Island Line
- Platforms: 2

Other information
- Station code: SAN
- Classification: DfT category F1

History
- Opened: 23 August 1864

Key dates
- 1 January 1967: Closed for electrification
- 20 March 1967: Reopened
- 28 October 1988: Signal box closed and functions moved to Ryde St John's Road signal box
- 3 January 2021: Closed for upgrade works
- 1 November 2021: Reopened

Passengers
- 2020/21: ▼23,936
- 2021/22: ▲46,860
- 2022/23: ▲83,500
- 2023/24: ▼79,696
- 2024/25: ▲81,918
Location
Notes
- Passenger statistics from the Office of Rail and Road

Sandown railway station is a railway station serving Sandown on the Isle of Wight, England. It is located on the Island Line from Ryde to Shanklin.

== History ==
Sandown station is a double platform-faced through station. However, from the mid 19th until the mid 20th century it was a junction station, also served by trains to and from Horringford, Merstone, Newport and Cowes. These lines used to be run by separate companies, the Isle of Wight Railway (Ryde-Ventnor) and the Isle of Wight Central Railway (Newport-Sandown).

The adjacent land, which used to be occupied by coal-yards, is now a housing estate and the former Terminus Hotel pub opposite has long been a private house. The line from Ryde to Shanklin was constructed between 1862 and 1864, and opened to passenger traffic on 23 August 1864. The original station building was extended between 1870 and 1871 through the addition of a two-storey extension to act as station offices.

In 1923, with the Grouping, came the formation of the Southern Railway. This brought all the railway services on the island under one management, and considerable modernisation. At first, it did not affect the services offered, but eventually the line from Ryde gained a more frequent service whilst the Merstone line declined. One particular feature of the Merstone line was the School Train, which was subsidised by the local authority, and for a significant time meant that the line remained viable. When the line was closed, children from outlying villages going to the Sandown Schools were then transported by bus, the current situation.

== Services ==
All services at Sandown are operated by Island Line using Class 484 EMUs.

The typical off-peak service in trains per hour is:

- 3 trains per 2 hours to Ryde Pier Head
- 3 trains per 2 hours to Shanklin

These services call at all stations, except Smallbrook Junction, which is served only during operating dates for the Isle of Wight Steam Railway.

Preceding station	Island Line	Following station
Brading towards Ryde Pier Head	Island Line	Lake towards Shanklin
Former lines
Terminus	Newport-Sandown line	Alverstone towards Newport

== Gallery ==
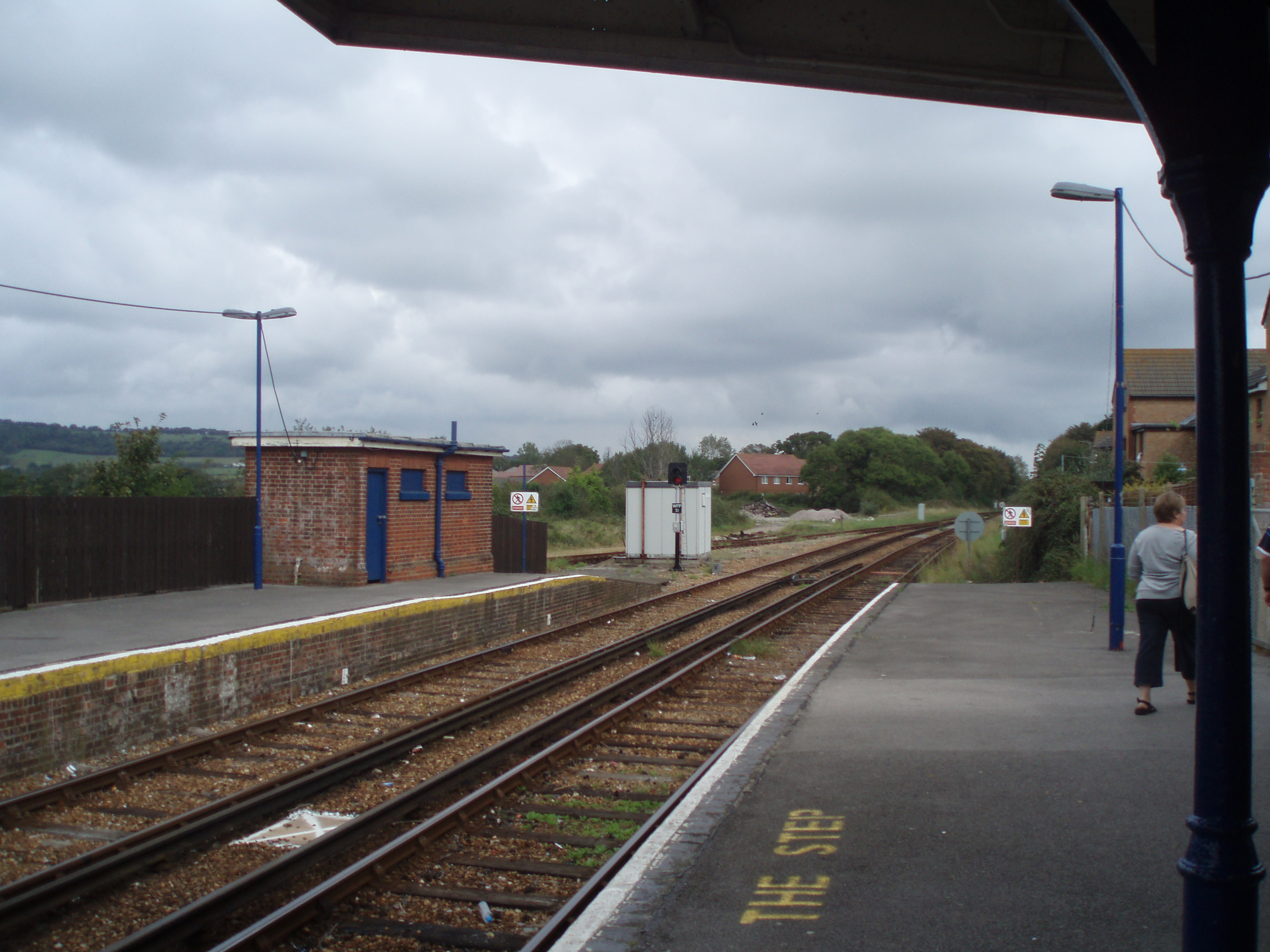
Looking north

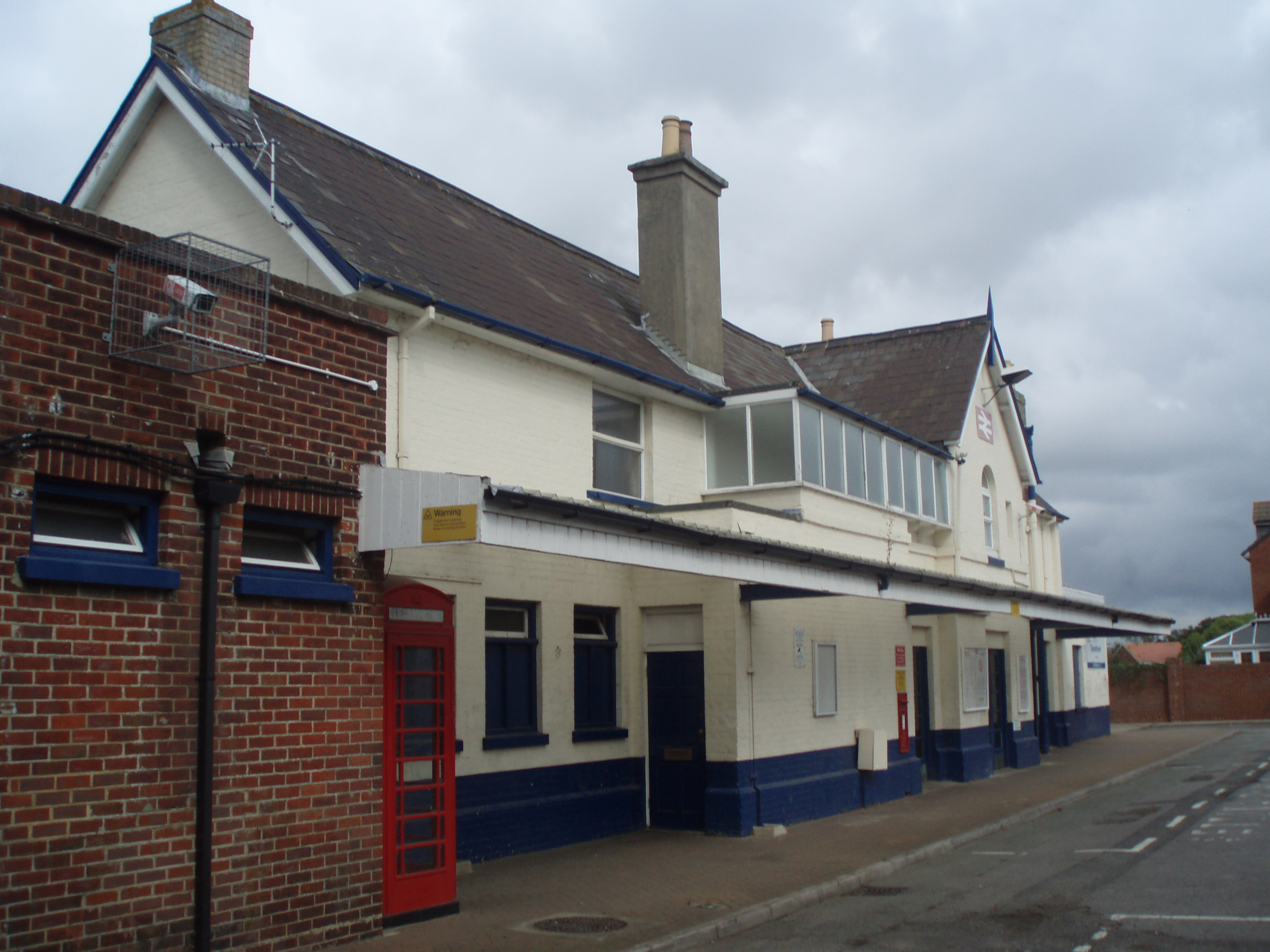
Main entrance

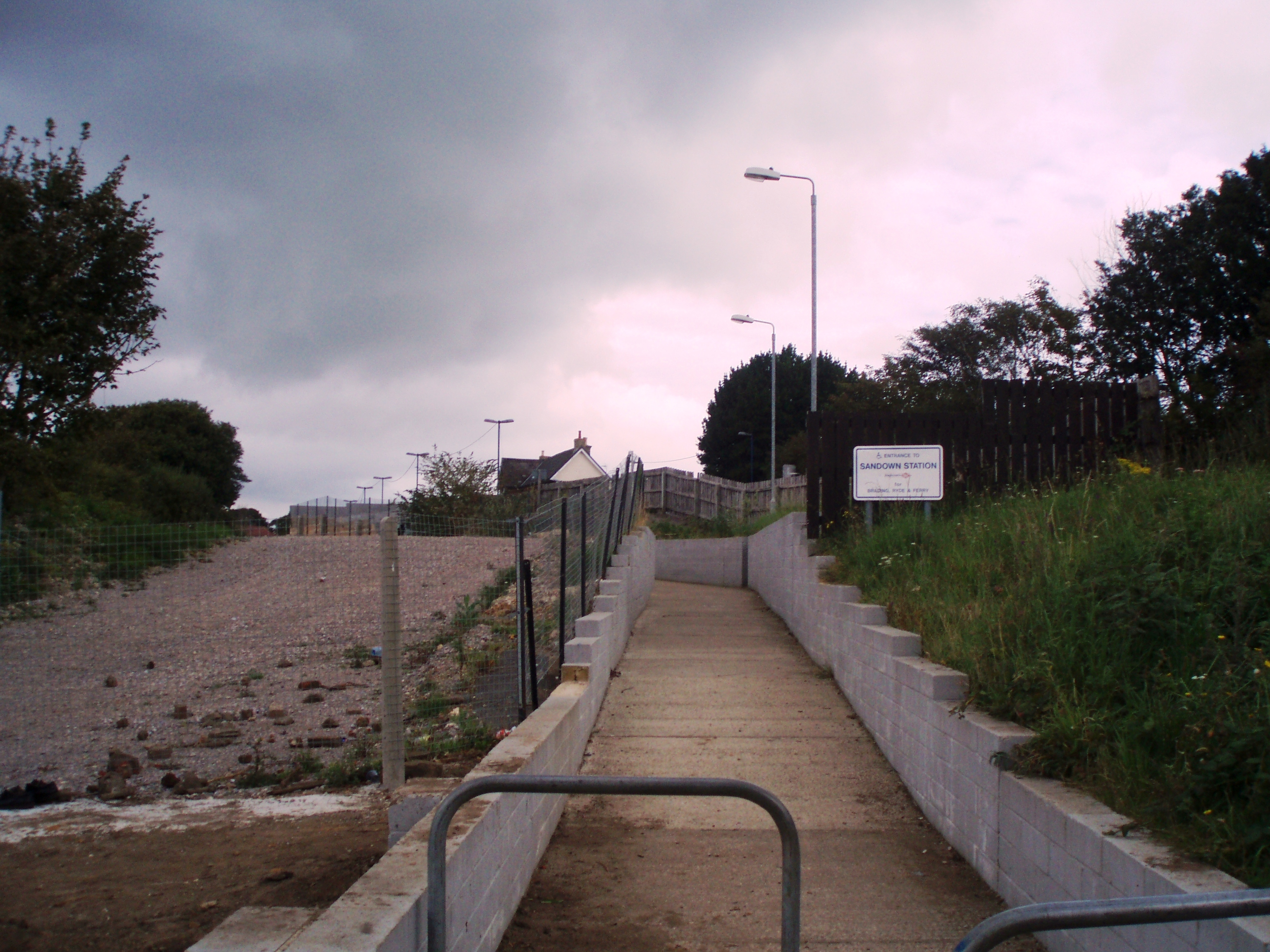
Entrance from other side

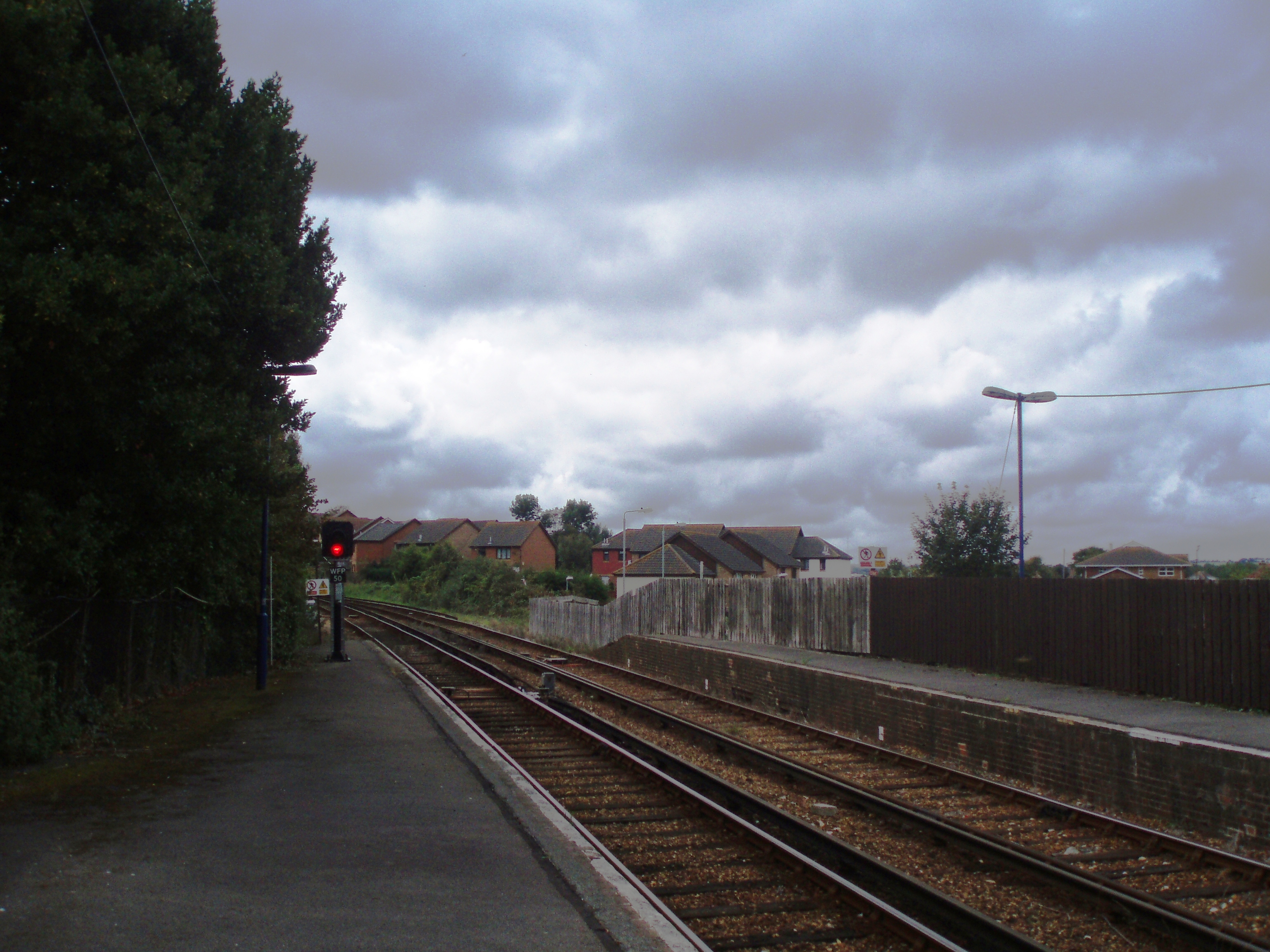
Looking south

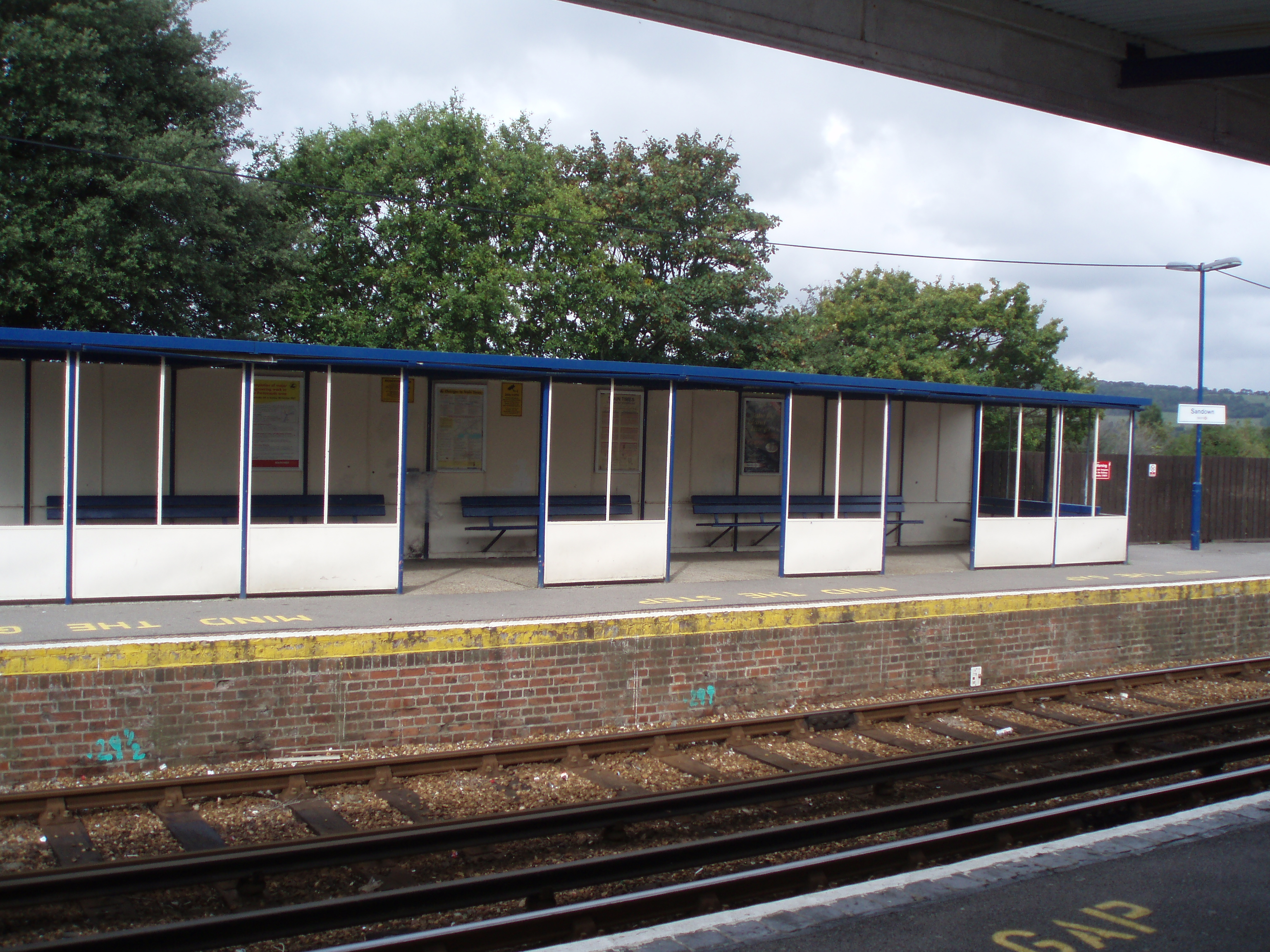
Shelter on "To Ryde (North)" platform

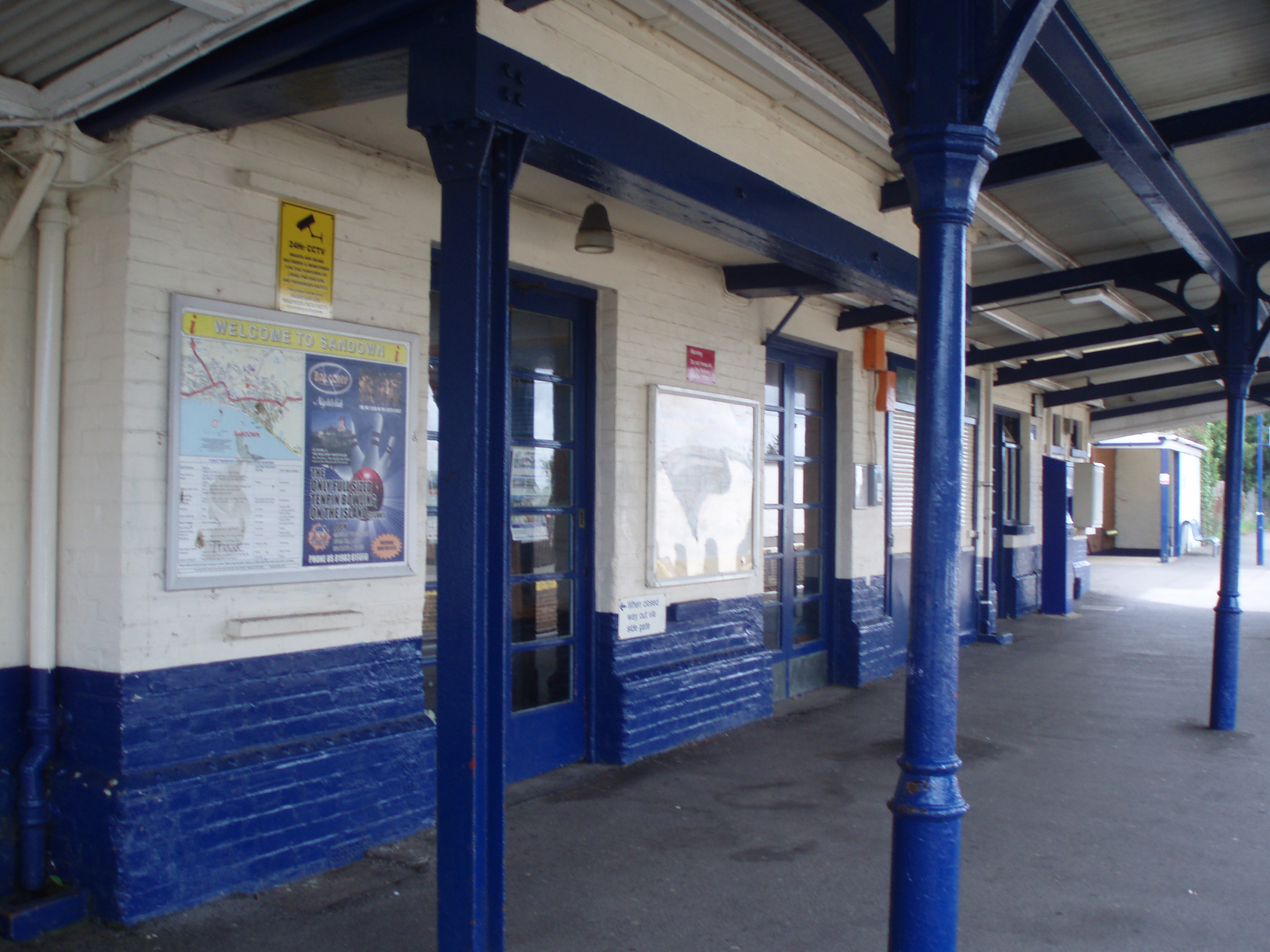
Canopy on "To Shanklin (South)" side

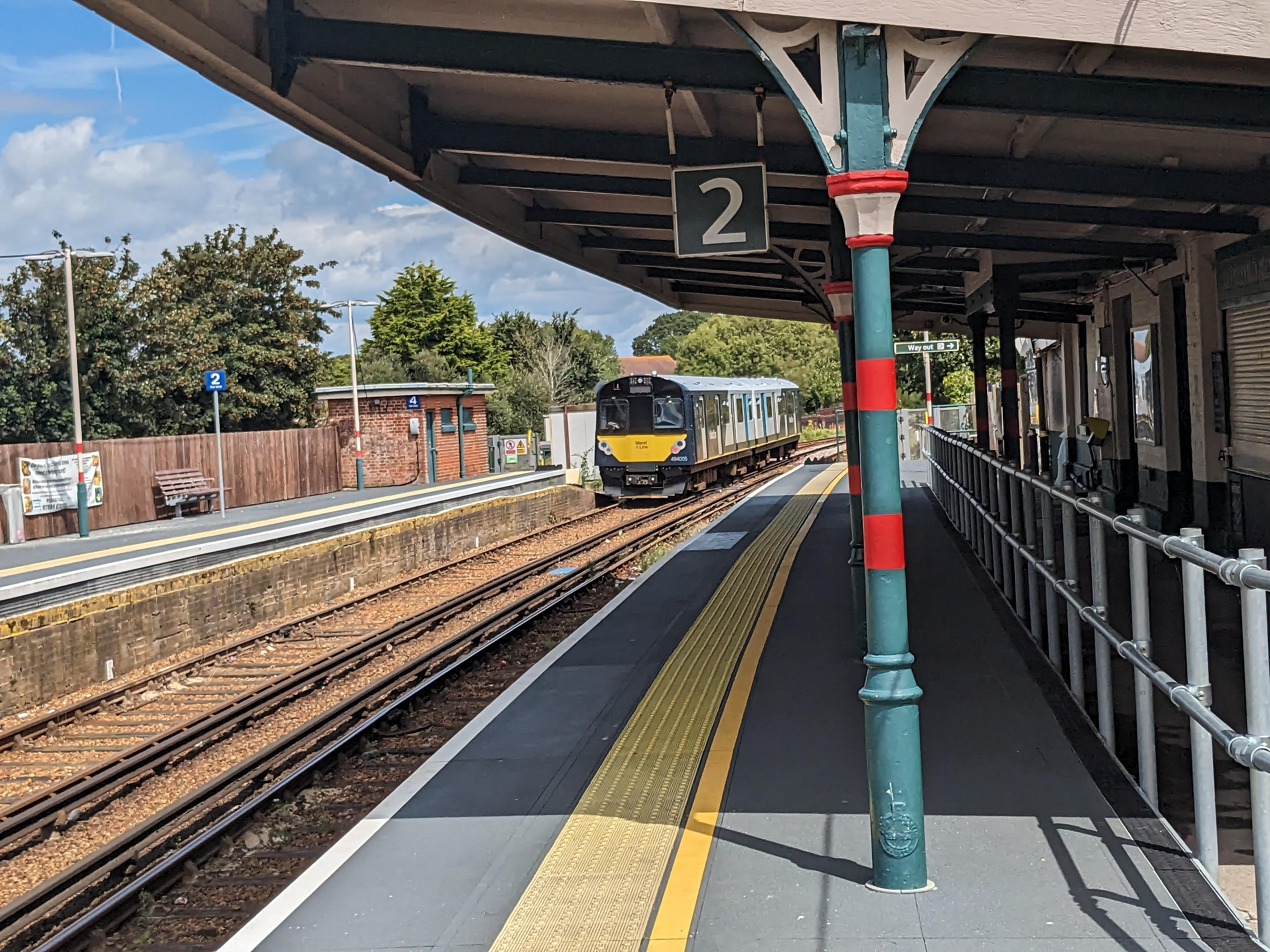
Class 484 departing platform 1
