= LKE =

LKE, or Lke, may refer to

- LKE, the IATA code for Kenmore Air Harbor Seaplane Base in the state of Washington, US
- LKE, the ICAO code for Lucky Air in Yunnan, China
- lke, the ISO 639-3 code for the Soga language spoken in Eastern Uganda
- LKE, the National Rail code for Lake railway station on the Isle of Wight, UK
