= Shanklin railway station =

Railway station on the Isle of Wight, England

Shanklin
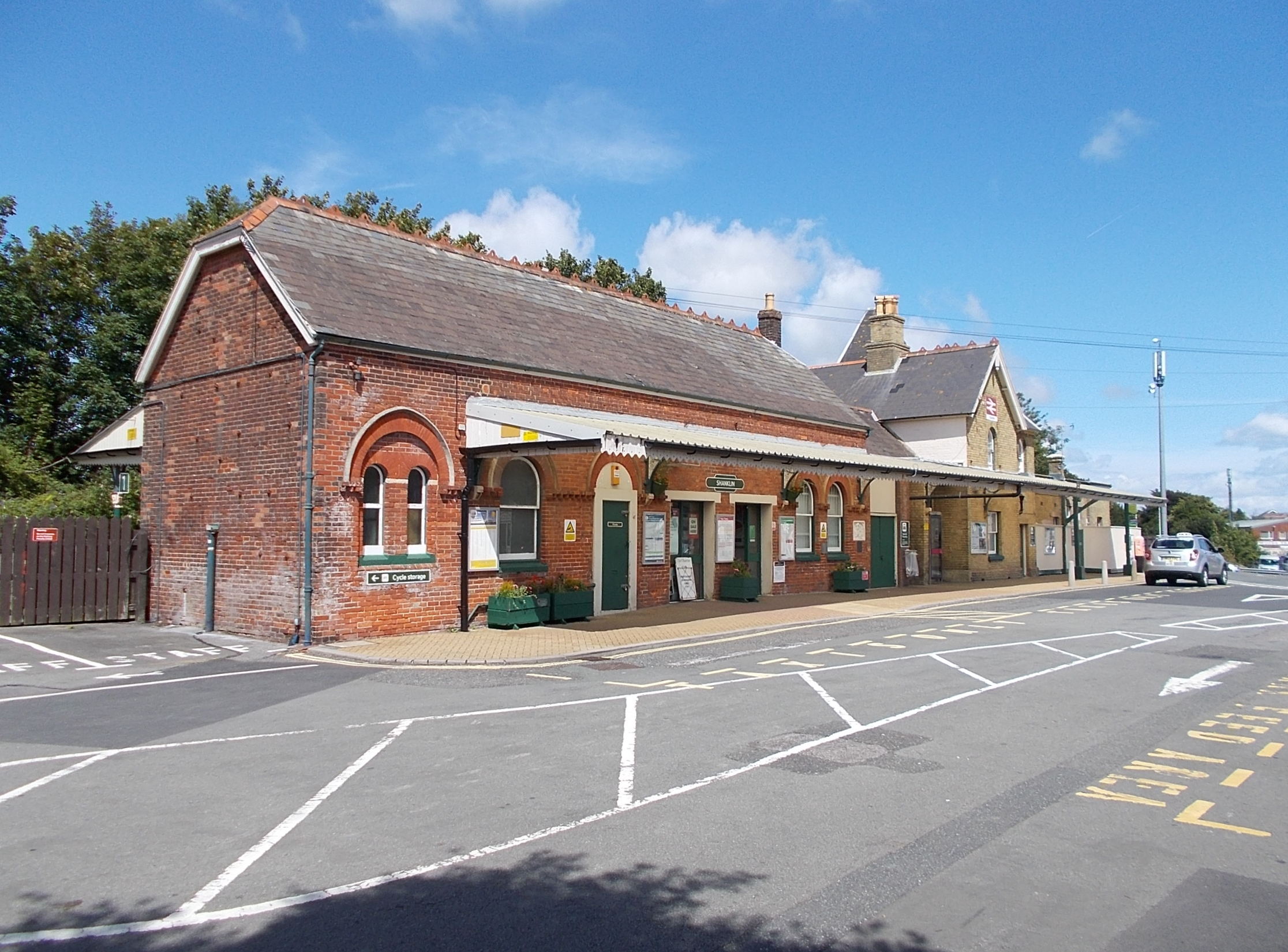
- The station building in 2011

General information
- Location: Shanklin, Isle of Wight; England
- Coordinates: 50.633767°N 1.179073°W
- Grid reference: SZ580819
- Managed by: South Western Railway
- Platforms: 1

Other information
- Station code: SHN
- Classification: DfT category E

History
- Opened: 23 August 1864

Key dates
- 1 January 1967: Closed for electrification
- 20 March 1967: Reopened
- 3 January 2021: Closed for upgrade works
- 1 November 2021: Reopened

Passengers
- 2020/21: ▼49,110
- 2021/22: ▲83,326
- 2022/23: ▲0.150 million
- 2023/24: ▼0.146 million
- 2024/25: 0.146 million

Listed Building – Grade II
- Feature: Shanklin Railway Station
- Designated: 14 February 1992
- Reference no.: 1365375
Location
Notes
- Passenger statistics from the Office of Rail and Road

Shanklin railway station is a Grade II listed railway station serving Shanklin on the Isle of Wight. It is the present terminus of the Island Line from Ryde, although the line used to continue to Wroxall and Ventnor. The station now has one platform with a ticket office and a small shop, the second platform is now in use as a flower bed. The former subway has been filled in.

Passengers can change onto Southern Vectis buses to Ventnor and St Lawrence.

== History ==
The station opened on 23 August 1864. The station buildings were extended in 1881.

=== Stationmasters ===
- Robert Edward Wright 1864 - 1865 (afterwards station master at Ryde)
- James Voy Sulley 1865 - 1871
- Charles Panty 1871 (formerly station master at Wroxall, afterwards station master at Ryde St John's Road)
- George Humby 1871 - 1913 (formerly station master at Brading)
- Charles Herbert Colenutt 1913 - 1937 (formerly station master at Ryde St John's Road)
- W. Lown from 1937 (formerly station master at Woldington)

== Service ==
All services at Shanklin are operated by Island Line using Class 484 EMUs.

The station is served by 3 trains every 2 hours to and from Ryde Pier Head. These services call at all stations, except Smallbrook Junction which opens only during steam operating dates.

Preceding station	Island Line	Following station
Lake towards Ryde Pier Head	Island Line	Terminus
Former lines
Sandown towards Ryde Pier Head	Isle of Wight Railway	Wroxall towards Ventnor

== Bus routes ==
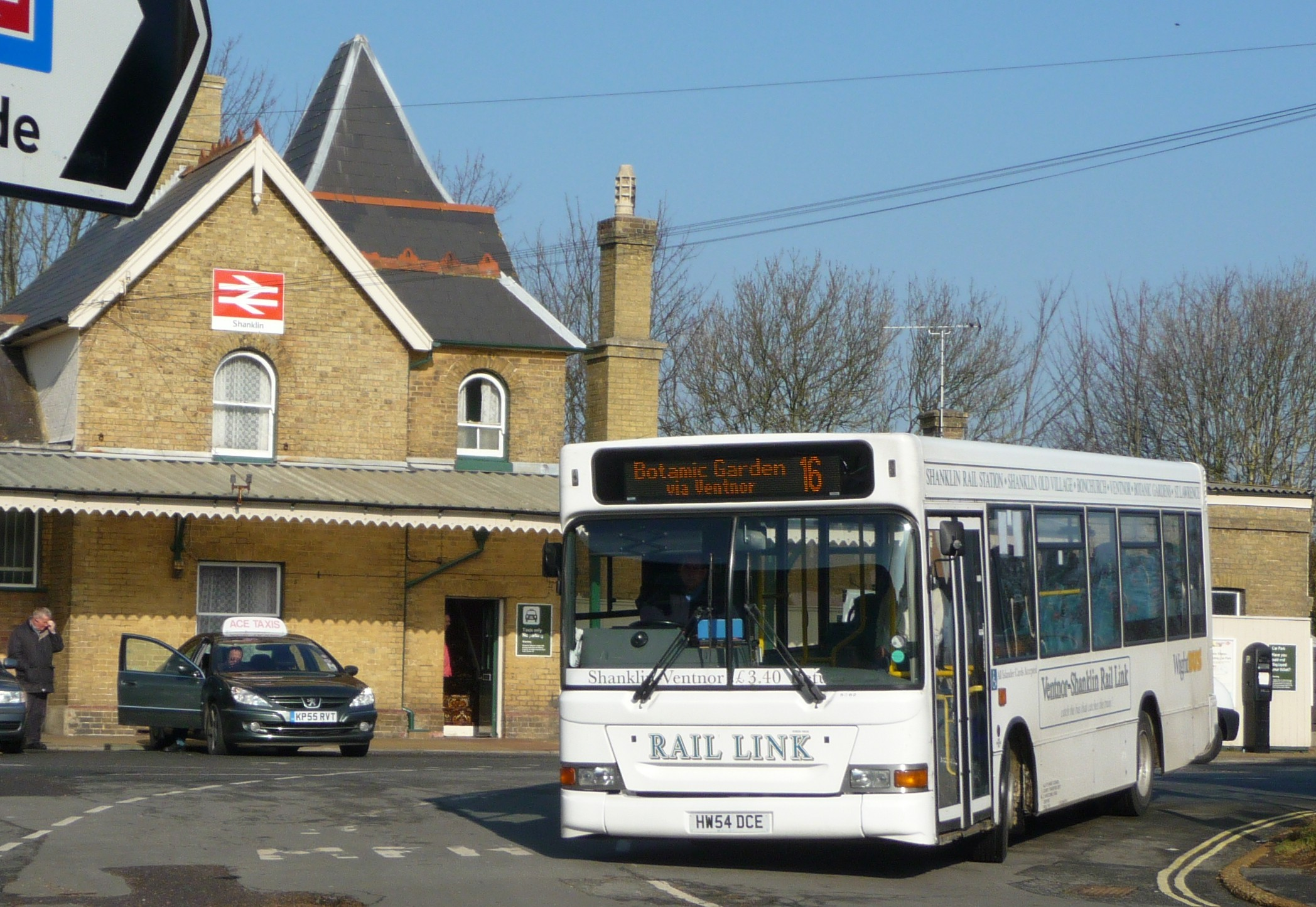
A Wightbus Railink bus leaving the station at Shanklin.

The following buses run from Shanklin Station or nearby. All services, unless noted, are run by Southern Vectis.

No.	Destinations	Frequency (Mon-Sat daytime)	Departure Point
2	Sandown or Godshill, Rookley and Newport	30 minutes	Co-op
3	Sandown, Brading and Ryde or Ventnor, Wroxall, then Newport	30 minutes	Station forecourt
22	Sibden Hill or Perowne Way and Sandown	Selected Times	Co-op
24	Sandown and Yaverland (Culver Way) or Shanklin Esplanade	Selected times	Co-op
Summer only tourist services
Shanklin Shuttle	Esplanade, Old Village, Town Centre	30 minutes	Station Forecourt
Island Coaster	Sandown, Brading and Ryde or Esplanade, Ventnor, Blackgang Chine, Freshwater Bay, Alum Bay, Yarmouth	3 Journeys a Day	Station Forecourt

== Gallery ==
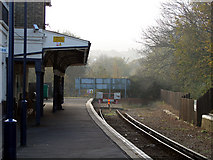
The end of the line

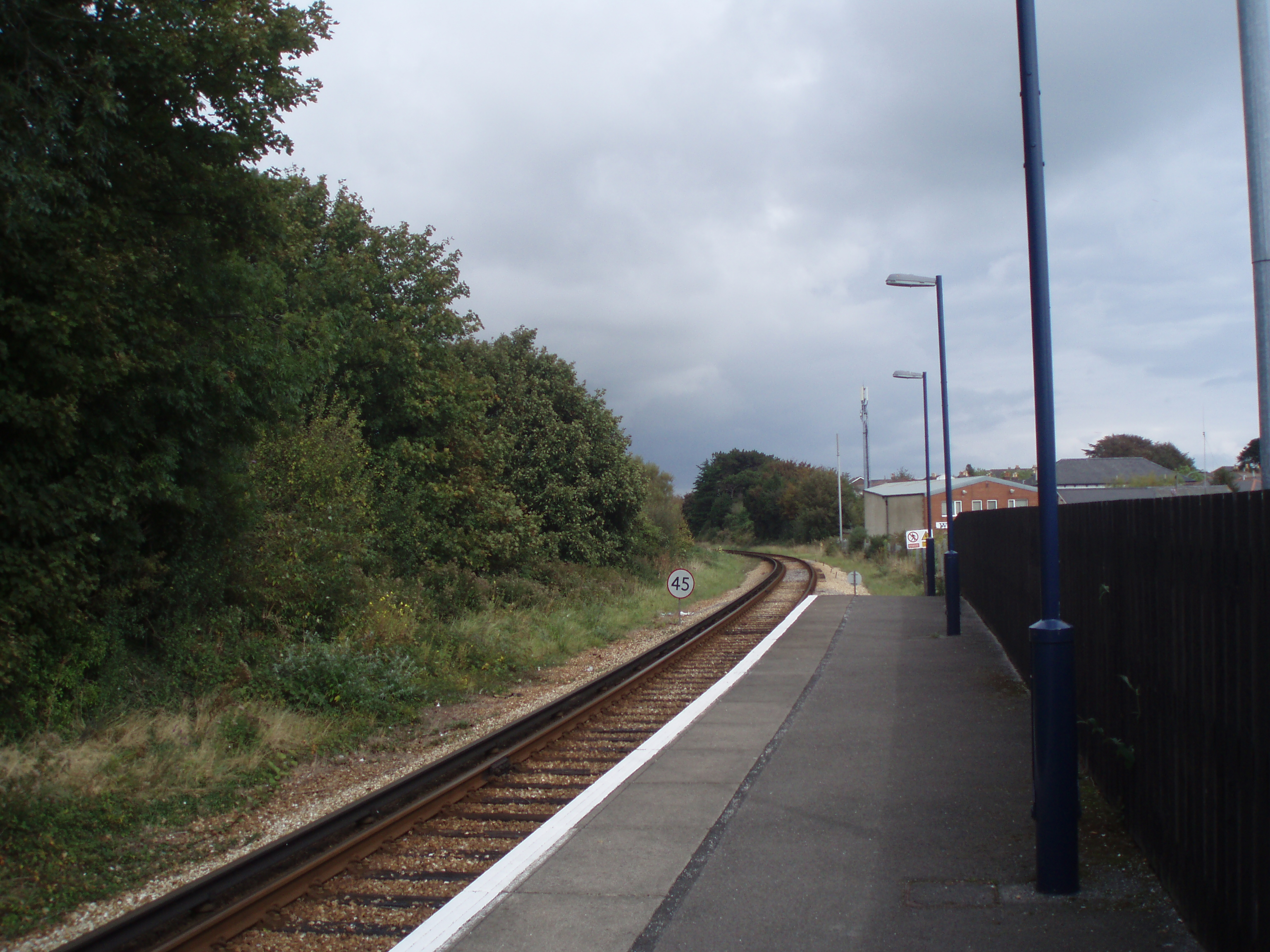
Looking towards Lake

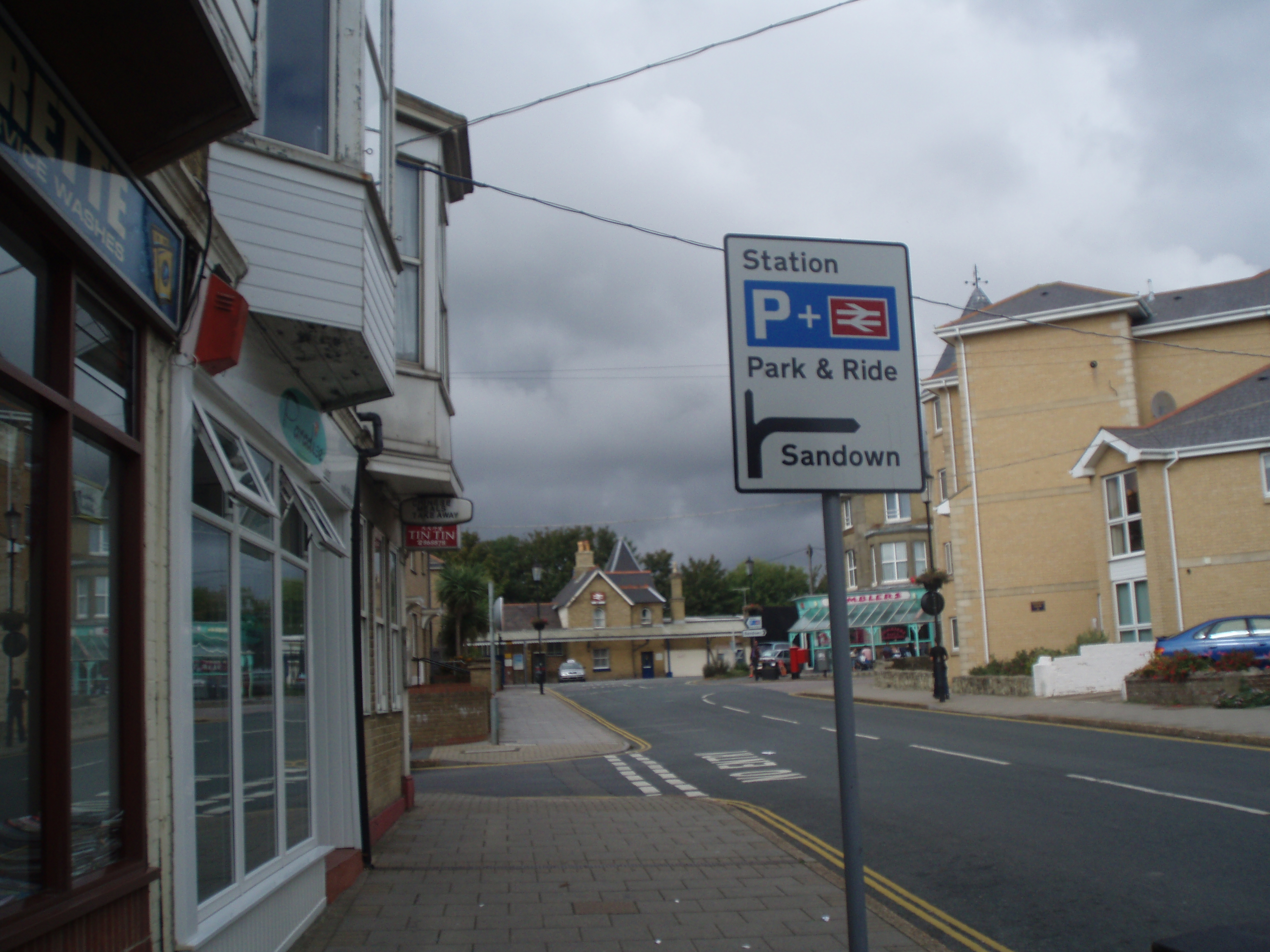
From St Paul's Parish Church

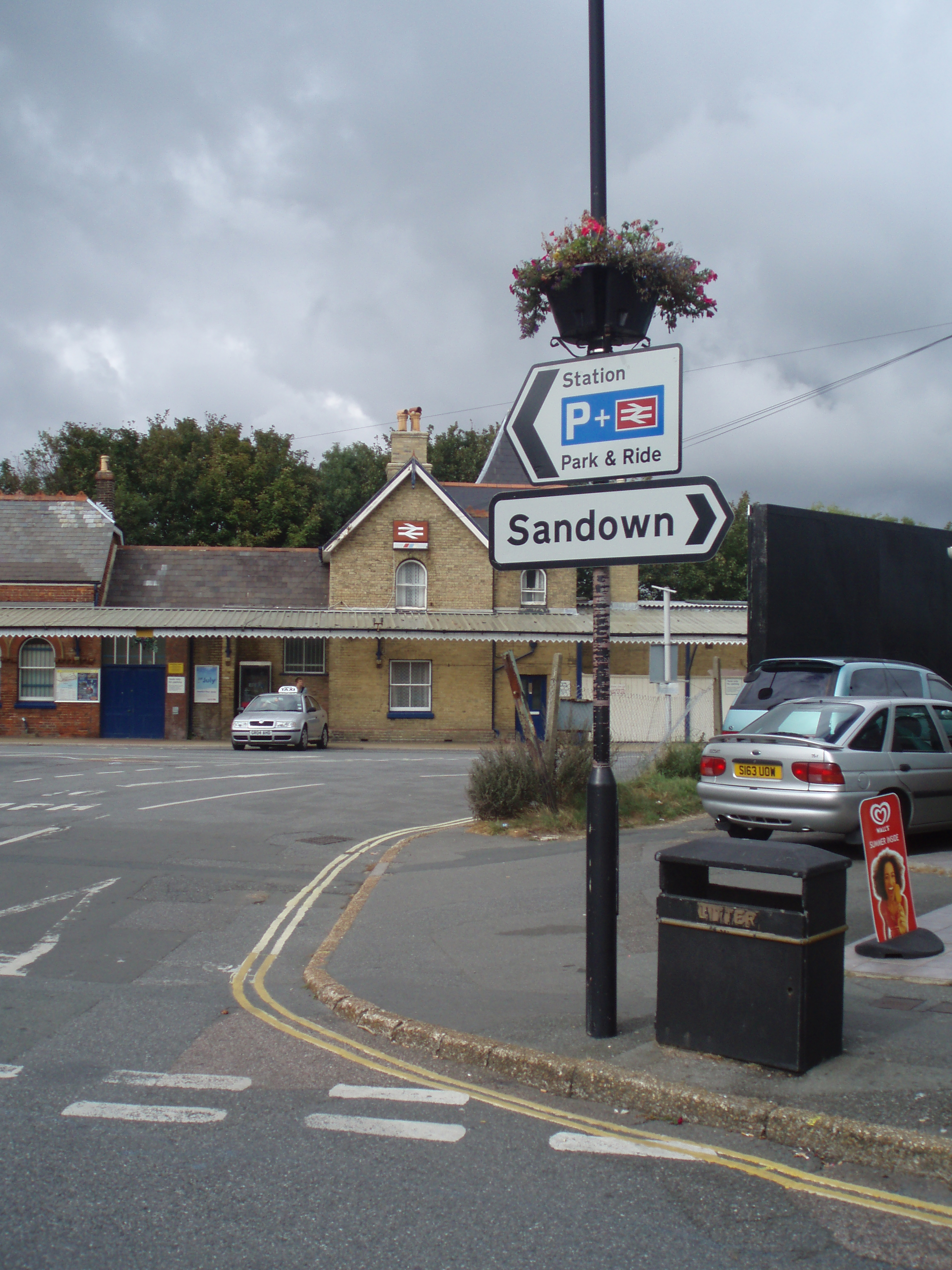
from junction with road to Sandown

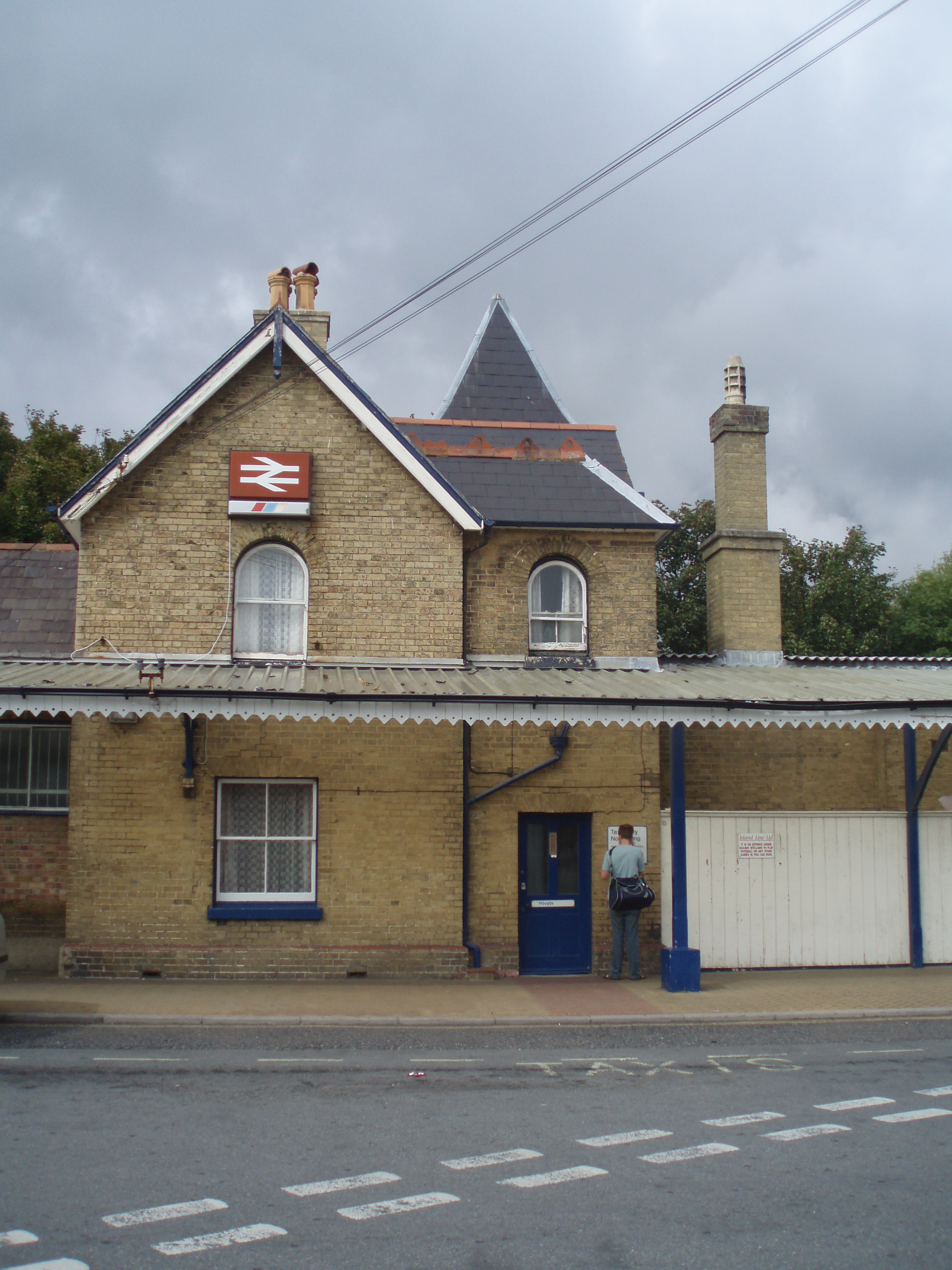
From station forecourt

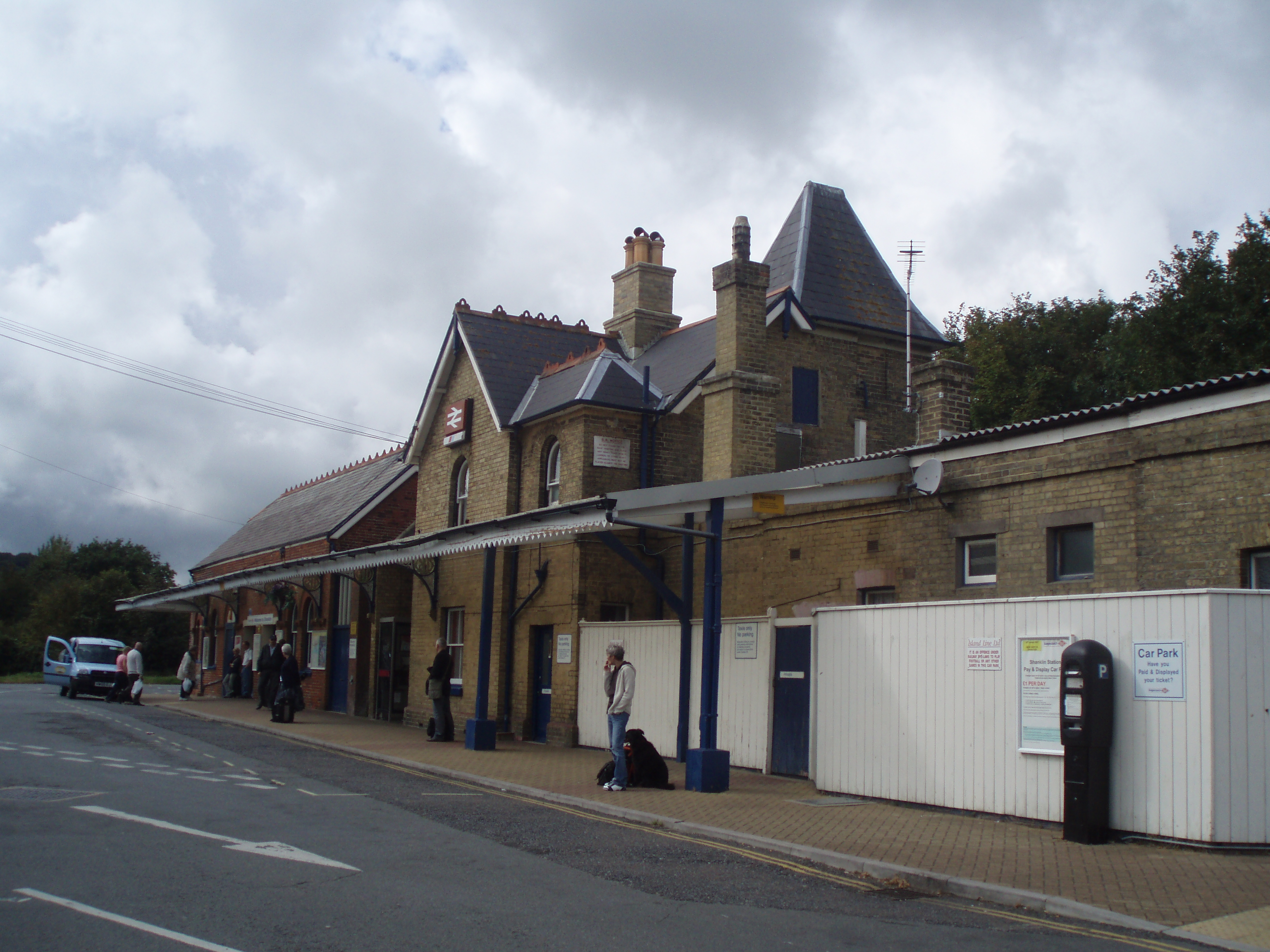
Waiting for bus link to Ventnor

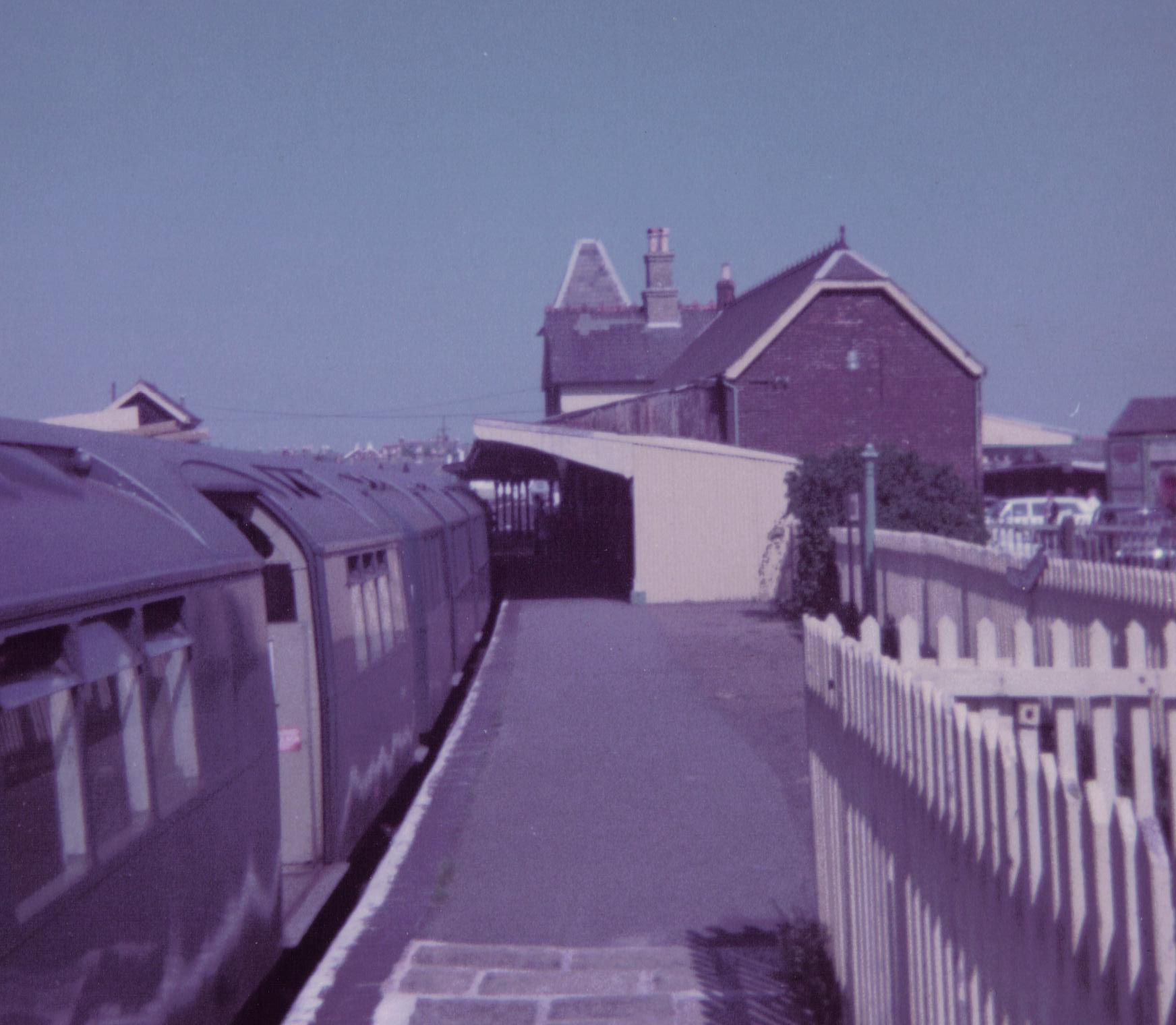
Shanklin in 1971
