= Ventnor railway station =

Former railway station in Isle of Wight, UK

Coordinates: 50.5976°N 1.2088°W

Ventnor
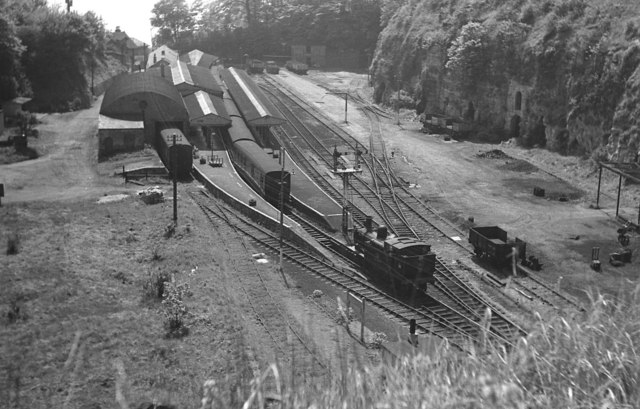
- Ventnor railway station in 1963

General information
- Location: Ventnor, Isle of Wight; England
- Platforms: 2

Other information
- Status: Disused

History
- Pre-grouping: Isle of Wight Railway (1864 to 1923)
- Post-grouping: Southern Railway (1923 to 1948); Southern Region of British Railways (1948 to 1966)

Key dates
- 10 September 1866: Opened
- 17 April 1966: Closed
Location

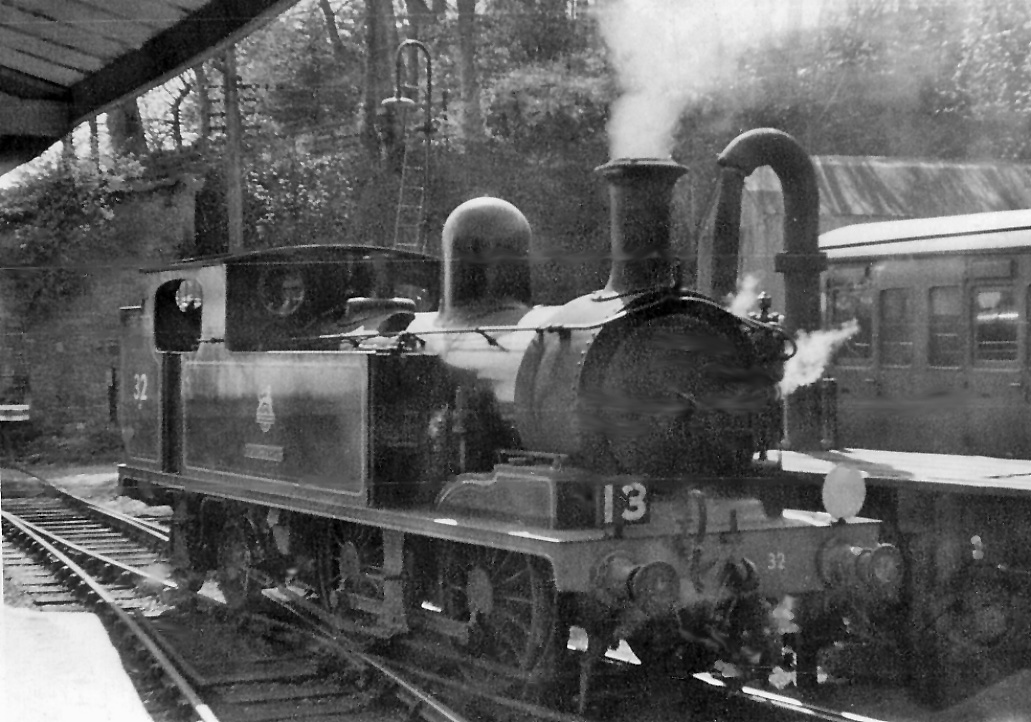
View towards the stops in 1954

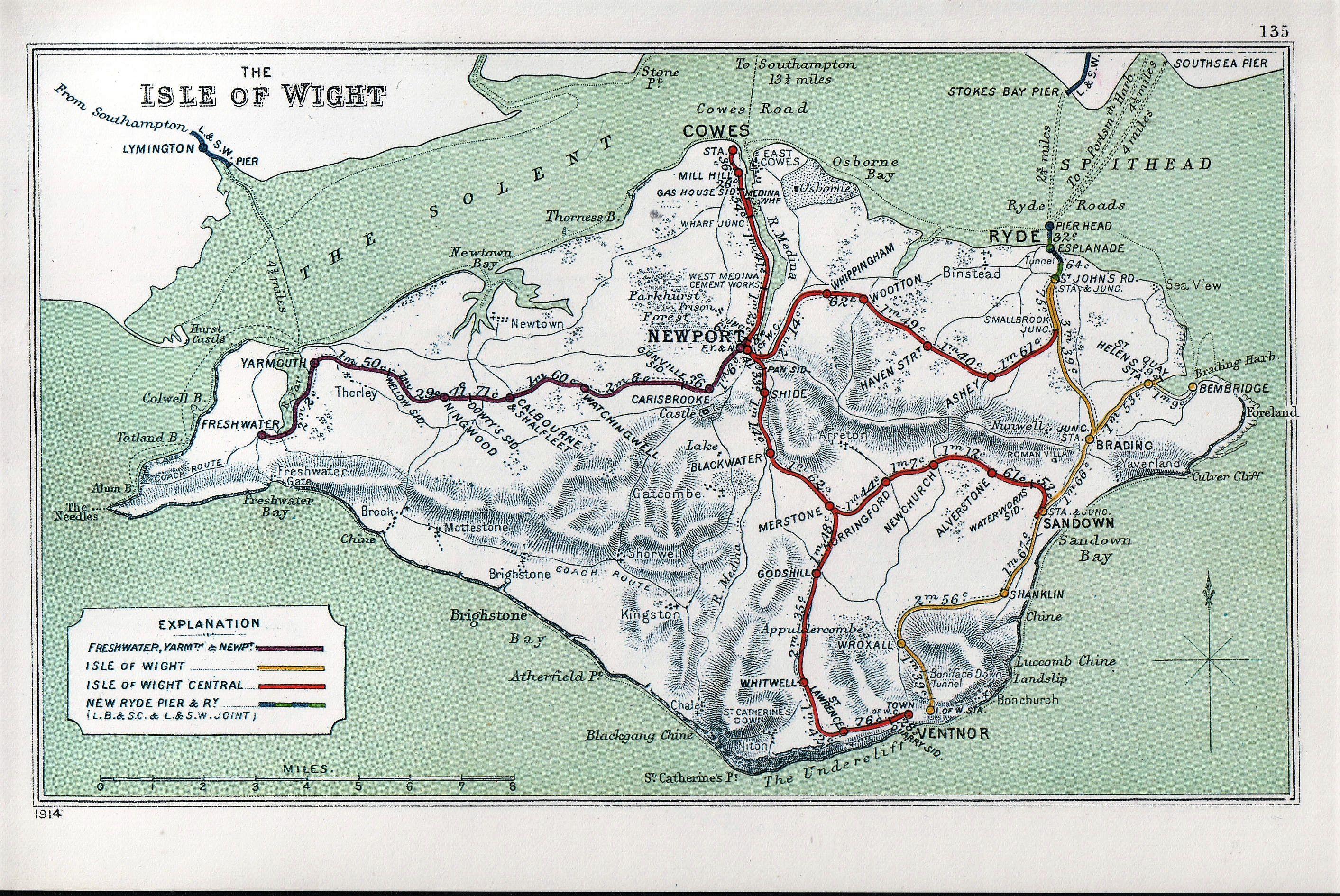
A 1914 Railway Clearing House map of lines around The Isle of Wight.

Ventnor railway station was the terminus of the Isle of Wight Railway line from Ryde.

== History ==
The station occupied a ledge 294 feet (90 m) above sea level which had been quarried into the hill side. The station was at the end of a 1,312-yard-long (1,200 m) tunnel through St Boniface Down. A turntable was used to allow steam engines to runaround their trains. In later years it was replaced by a three way switch. The tracks merged just before the tunnel and the locomotives had to enter the tunnel during run round manoeuvres.

The station had a platform connected to the station buildings and a narrow island platform. There was only one track between the side platform and the island platform. When this track was occupied, and an incoming train arrived at the outer face of the island platform and passengers had to pass through the train on the inner track. When this train then departed, a temporary bridge that was a former ship's gangway, as used on the Portsmouth to Ryde ferries, was manually pushed across the intervening track to allow passenger access to the train on the outside of the island platform. Further away from the station buildings were goods sidings which mainly served coal merchants who operated from caves in the chalk sides of the station cutting.

The station closed to all traffic in April 1966, when a decision was made by BR that the line south of Shanklin would close permanently and would not be electrified like the Ryde Pier Head to Shanklin line would. This was for two reasons: firstly, the bulk of the footfall was to Sandown and Shanklin where the bulk of the guest houses, B&Bs and hotels were. There was less footfall at Ventnor, and BR knew this from the ticket sales. Secondly, the budget set for the electrification was £500,000, and the project always hovered on being cancelled due to cost overruns. To electrify down to Ventnor from Shanklin would require a fourth 33kV/650V DC substation plus its own 33kV OH line connections. BR did not wish to finance that but tried to encourage the local authority to provide funding for the capital and running costs. This they refused to do, citing that it would cause an unfair financial burden on its rate payers, the bulk of whom were retired. BR had wished to close the entire Ryde to Shanklin and Ventnor line under the Beeching Report, but when consent was refused by the TUCC on grounds of extensive hardship to users, BR produced the new proposal to truncate the line at Shanklin. The track was lifted by 1970 and the station subsequently demolished. The site is now an industrial park and Southern Water runs a water pipe and sewer pipe through the tunnel.

This station should not be confused with Ventnor West railway station.

== Stationmasters ==
- Mr. Crutchley ca. 1867 ca. 1868
- Jeremiah Savage Elgee ca. 1869 ca. 1875
- William Wetherick ca. 1878 ca. 1905 (formerly station master at Brading)
- William Wheway ca. 1908 ca. 1910
- Philip Jenkin 1912 - 1927 (formerly station master at Wroxall)
- Percy Hawkins 1930 - 1936 (formerly station master at Horsley, afterwards station master at Newport)
- Oliver William Bennett from 1936 (formerly station master at Ottery St Mary)

Preceding station	Island Line	Following station
Wroxall towards Ryde Pier Head	Isle of Wight Railway	Terminus

== See also ==
- List of closed railway stations in Britain
