= Wroxall railway station =

Former railway station in England

Wroxall

General information
- Location: Wroxall, Isle of Wight, Isle of Wight; England
- Coordinates: 50°36′57″N 1°13′20″W
- Platforms: Two

Other information
- Status: Disused

History
- Pre-grouping: Isle of Wight Railway (1864 to 1923)
- Post-grouping: Southern Railway (1923 to 1948); Southern Region of British Railways (1948 to 1966)

Key dates
- 10 September 1866: Opened
- 17 April 1966: Closed
Location

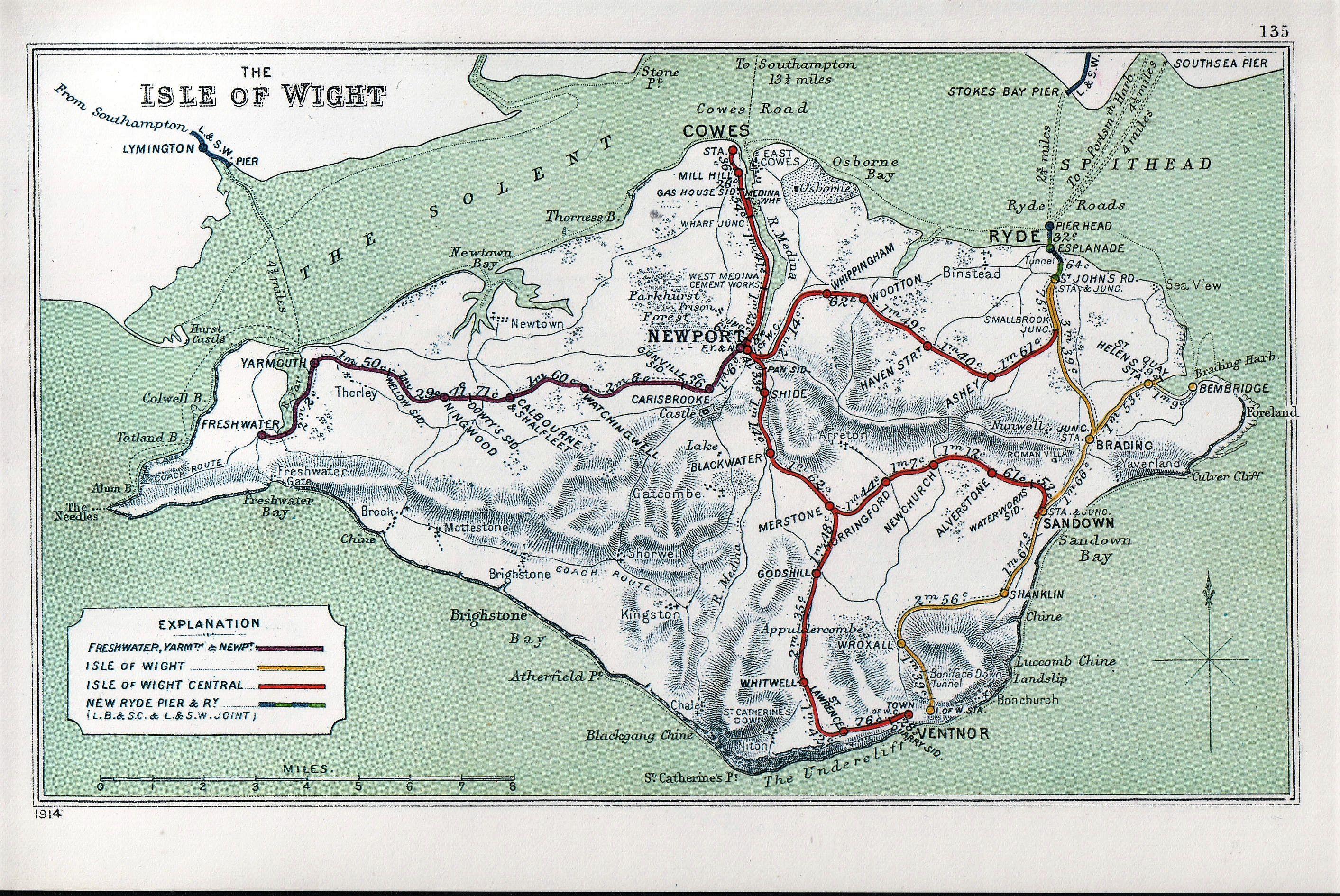
A 1914 Railway Clearing House map of lines around The Isle of Wight.

Wroxall railway station was an intermediate station on the Isle of Wight Railway line from Ryde to Ventnor, situated between Shanklin and Ventnor, with an upland situation. To the north lay the climb up Apse Bank and three bridges. The gradient eased in the station but increased again as Ventnor Tunnel was approached.

== History ==
Reasonably busy with commuter traffic all the year round, the station was originally built with a single siding. Goods traffic diminished rapidly with the advent of the motor bus. The Station Hotel was situated on the Up Platform. Next to this was a single-storey station building. On the downside was a small shelter. The station was lit by gas up until its closure. Apse bank was a favourite location for photographers, as it presented by far the hardest challenge to steam trains on the Ryde-Ventnor route.

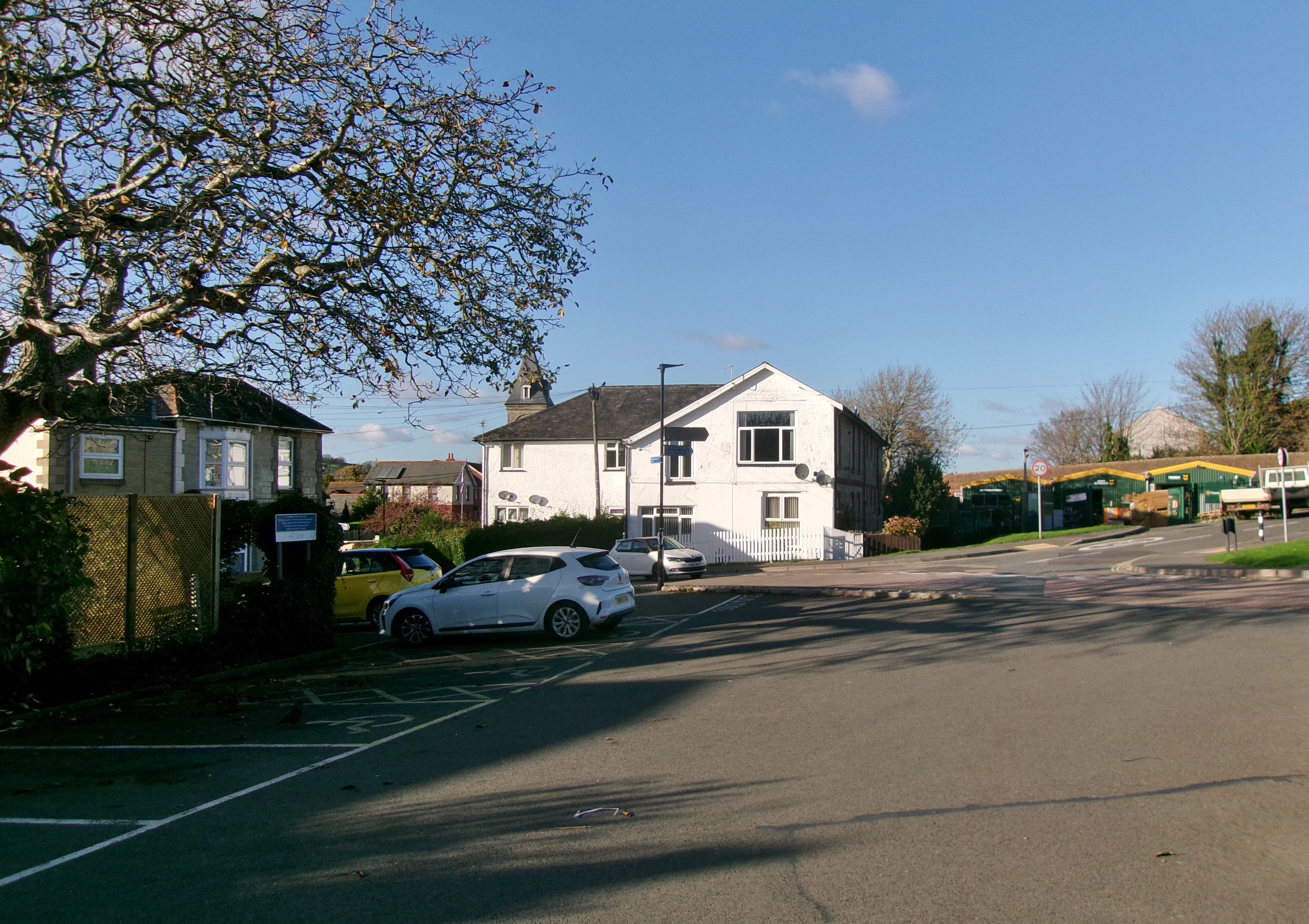
Site of the former station in 2025. The white building is the former station hotel.

The station closed in 1966, along with the line from Shanklin to Ventnor, and the station building was later demolished, with a new road (Station Road) built across the south end of the site. The adjacent Station Hotel still stands, having been converted into residential units, as does the road overbridge to the north of the former station site.

== Stationmasters ==
- Charles Panty ca. 1868 - 1871 (afterwards station master at Shanklin)
- Charles Newnham ca. 1876
- William Weeks 1877 - 1882 (afterwards station master at St Helen's)
- Philip Jenkin 1882 - 1912 (afterwards station master at Ventnor)
- Alex Wheway until 1919
- W. Lown from 1937 (also station master at Shanklin)

Preceding station	Island Line	Following station
Shanklin towards Ryde Pier Head	Isle of Wight Railway	Ventnor Terminus

== See also ==
- List of closed railway stations in Britain
