= Lake railway station =

Railway station on the Isle of Wight, England

Coordinates: 50.6463°N 1.1664°W

Lake
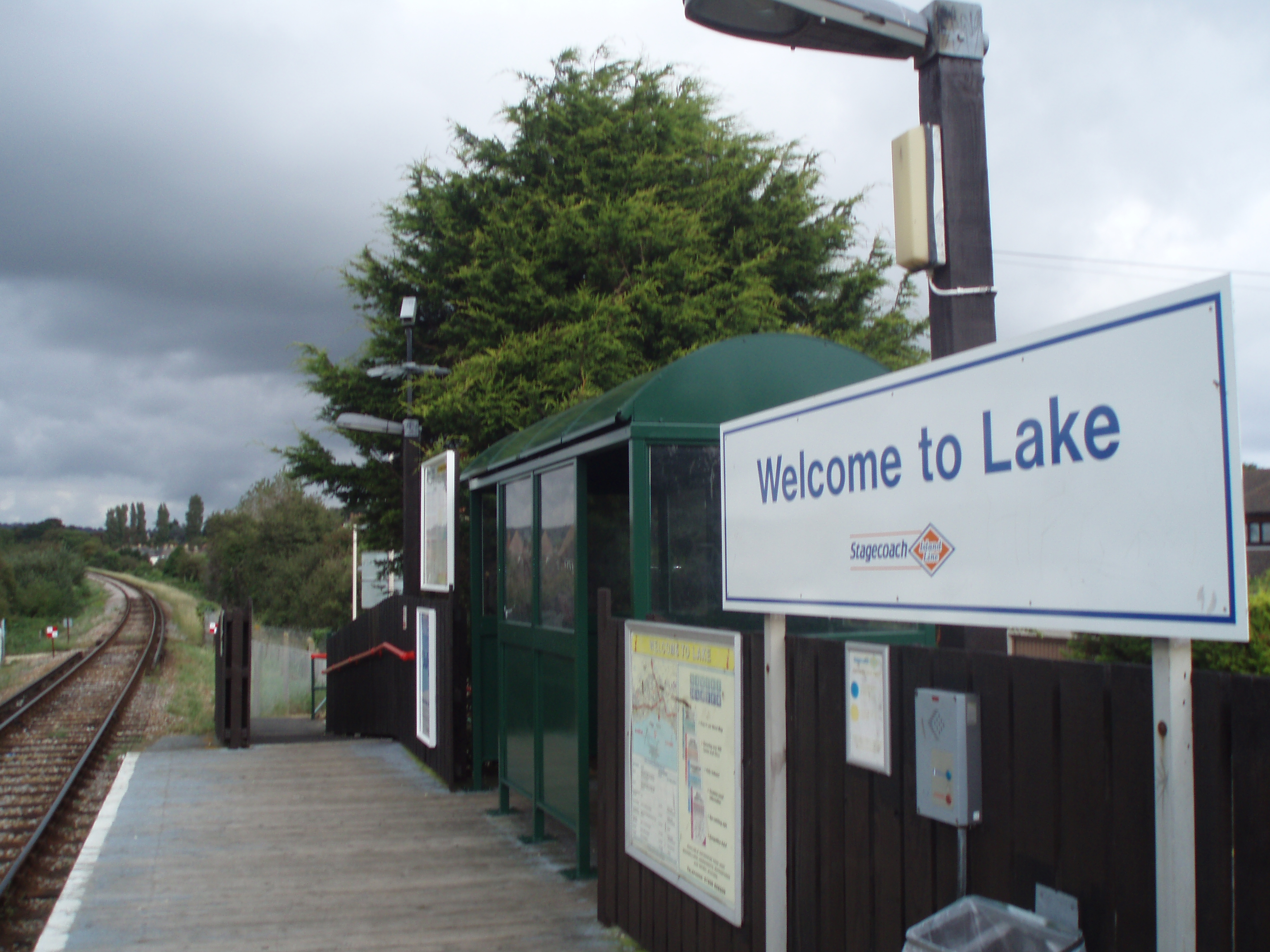

General information
- Location: Lake, Isle of Wight; United Kingdom
- Grid reference: SZ590833
- Manager: Island Line
- Platforms: 1

Other information
- Station code: LKE
- Classification: DfT category F2

History
- Opened: 11 May 1987

Key dates
- 3 January 2021: Closed for upgrade works
- 1 November 2021: Reopened

Passengers
- 2021/22: ▲11,574
- 2022/23: ▲21,000
- 2023/24: ▼19,384
- 2024/25: ▲19,744
- 2025/26: ▲24,484
Location
Notes
- Passenger statistics from the Office of Rail and Road

Lake railway station is a station on the Isle of Wight serving the village of Lake, situated in a quiet residential area not far from Lake Cliff Gardens and the beach at Sandown Bay. Until the construction of an interchange station with the Isle of Wight Steam Railway at Smallbrook Junction in 1991, this station was the newest on the island: it was opened by British Rail in 1987. The station is formed of a single platform with a shelter.

== Services ==
All services at Lake are operated by Island Line using Class 484 EMUs.

The typical off-peak service in trains per hour is:

- 3 trains per 2 hours to Ryde Pier Head
- 3 trains per 2 hours to Shanklin

These services call at all stations, except Smallbrook Junction, which is served only during operating dates for the Isle of Wight Steam Railway.

Preceding station	Island Line	Following station
Sandown towards Ryde Pier Head	Island Line	Shanklin Terminus
