= Island Line, Isle of Wight =

Electrified railway line on the Isle of Wight

Island Line
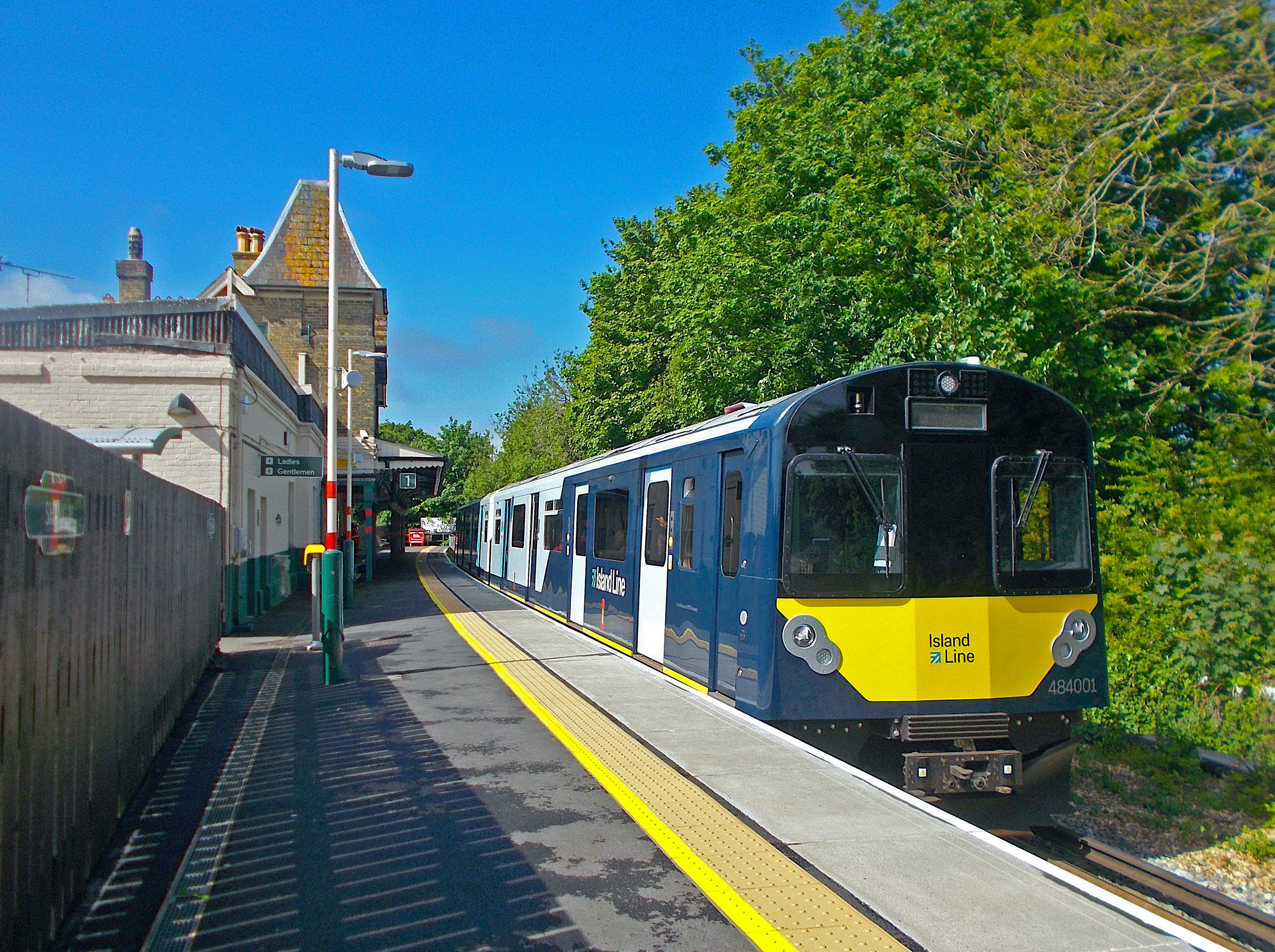
- An Island Line Class 484 at Shanklin in 2022

Overview
- Status: Operational
- Owner: South Western Railway
- Locale: Isle of Wight
- Termini: Ryde Pier Head 50.7385°N 1.1604°W; Shanklin 50.6338°N 1.1798°W

Service
- Type: Community railway
- Operator: Island Line
- Depot: Ryde
- Rolling stock: British Rail Class 484

History
- Opened: 5 April 1880
- Closed: 3 January 1967 (temporarily)
- Reopened: 1 April 1967
- Closed: 3 January 2021 (temporarily)
- Reopened: 1 November 2021

Technical
- Line length: 8 1/2 mi (13.7 km)
- Number of tracks: Mixture of single and double track
- Character: Fully grade separated except foot crossings
- Track gauge: 4 ft 8 1/2 in (1,435 mm) standard gauge
- Loading gauge: W6
- Route availability: RA 1
- Electrification: 750 V DC third rail (660 V DC before January 2021)
- Operating speed: 45 mph (72 km/h)
Route map
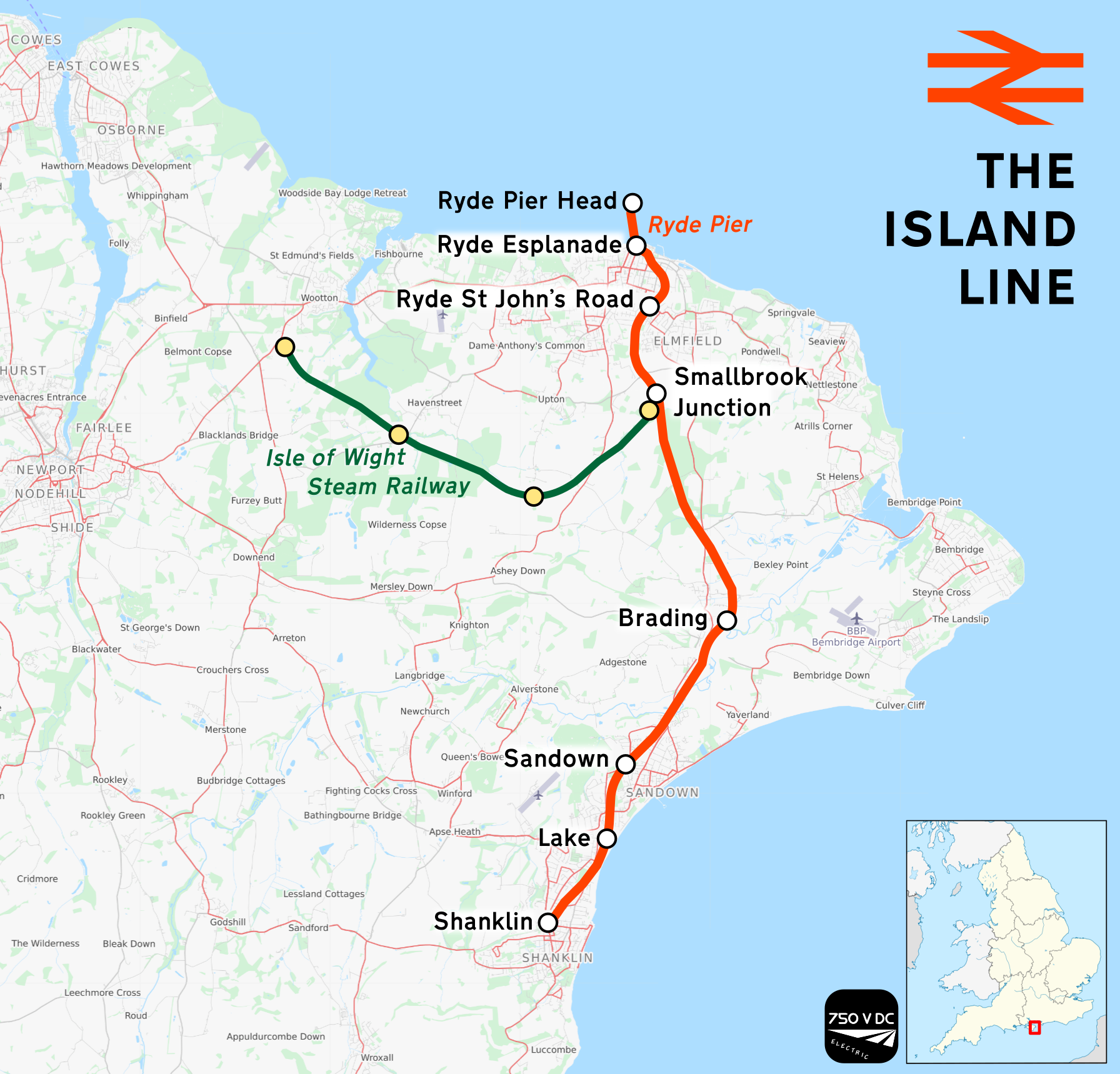
(Click to expand)

The Island Line is a railway line on the Isle of Wight which links Ryde Pier Head with Shanklin on the Island's east coast. Trains connect at Ryde Pier Head with passenger ferries to Portsmouth Harbour, and these ferries in turn connect with the rest of the National Rail network via the Portsmouth Direct Line. The line also connects to the Isle of Wight Steam Railway, a heritage railway, at Smallbrook Junction. For much of its length the line runs alongside the A3055, criss-crossing this road by means of the Ryde Tunnel and bridges at Rowborough, Morton Common, Lake Hill and Littlestairs.

== Route ==
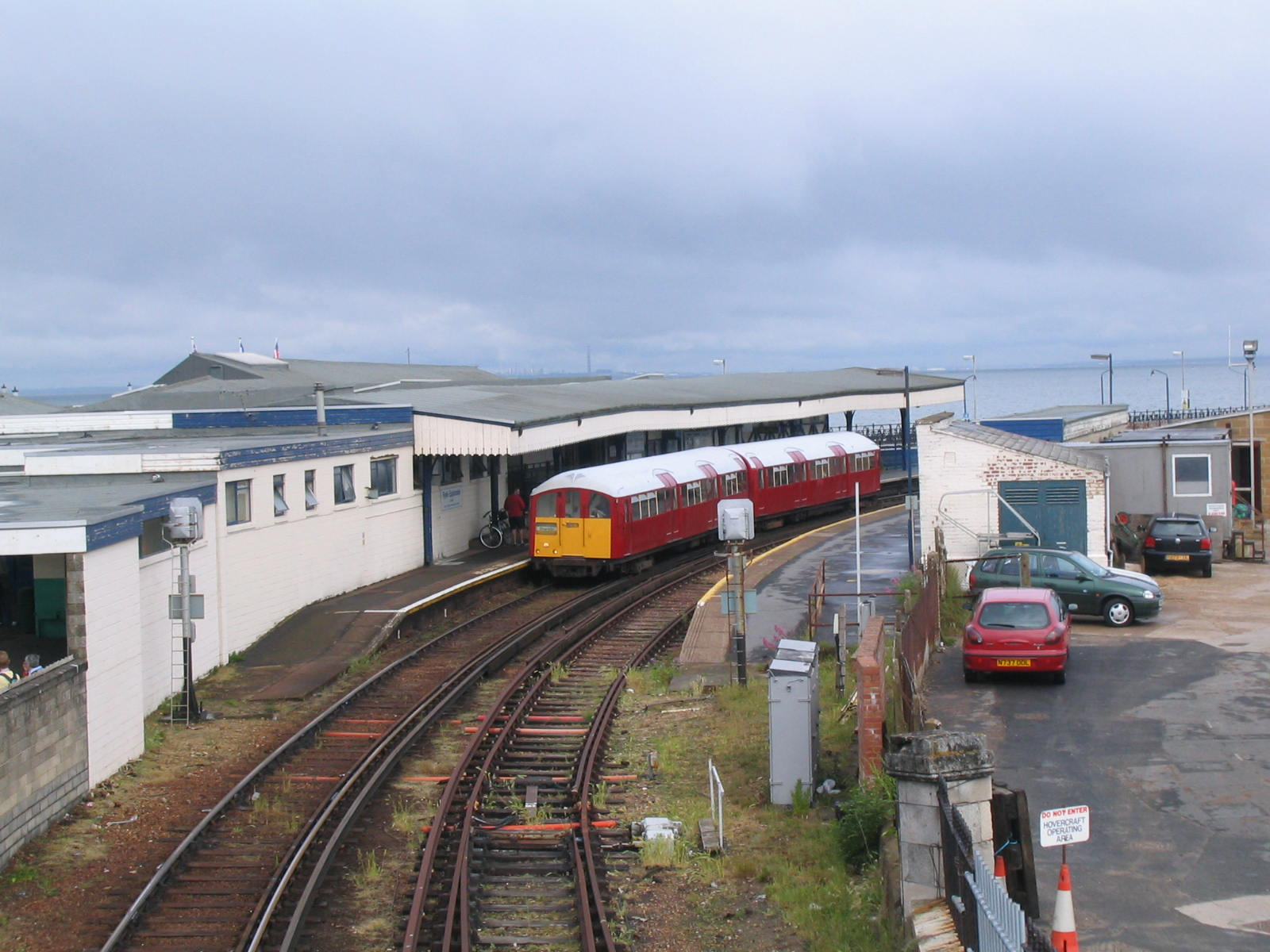
A Class 483 unit in service in London Transport livery at Ryde Esplanade

The line starts at Ryde Pier Head station, (Note: Mileage on the line is measured from this station, starting at 0 miles 0 chains (0 km).) which is located at the sea end of Ryde Pier and connects with cross−Solent ferry services to/from Portsmouth Harbour operated by Wightlink. The station has an island platform with two platform faces and two tracks, although only the western track (and thus only one platform face) remains in passenger use. From here, the line runs along the pier's eastern side towards the shore before reaching Ryde Esplanade station (Note: Mileage: 0 miles 32 chains (0.64 km)) at the other end of the pier. Located north of Ryde's town centre, Esplanade station is the busiest of the three stations in the town; it forms part of the town's main transport interchange along with the nearby Ryde Bus Station (offering bus services to the rest of the island) and Ryde Hoverport (with cross−Solent hovercraft connections to and from Southsea). The station has one side platform in operation; a second platform, which was converted into a garden in 2015, lies adjacent to the disused track.

Although the line along the pier appears to be a typical double-track line, the eastern track was disconnected during the 2021 upgrade works. This was originally done to allow the potential placement of a co-acting signal on platform 1 within the disused track bed at Ryde Esplanade, though an alternative signalling solution was ultimately chosen. Prior to that, there was no crossover between the two tracks until immediately south of Esplanade station, meaning they were de facto two separate single-track lines, a layout similar to those at Bare Lane, Glenrothes with Thornton and Worcester Foregate Street stations.

South of Esplanade station, both tracks are operational. The line continues as double-track through Ryde via the Ryde Tunnel, bypassing the town centre to the northeast, before it reaches Ryde St John's Road station (Note: Mileage: 1 mile 19 chains (2.0 km)) to the east of the town centre. The station has a total of three platforms linked by a footbridge, two of which are in regular use by passenger services. The third platform, while open, is a south-facing bay platform, meaning only the few terminating services can stop there. Adjacent to St John's Road station is Ryde depot − the only traction maintenance depot on the line.

The line then leaves Ryde and continues southwards, reducing to single-track immediately north of the next station, Smallbrook Junction. (Note: Mileage: 2 miles 17 chains (3.6 km)) This station is unique on the National Rail network in that there is no public access into or out of the station − it exists purely as an interchange between the Island Line and the Isle of Wight Steam Railway. The station was built in 1991 − the same year that the steam railway was extended to this location. Despite the station's name there is no longer an actual junction here, as the two railway lines are not physically connected to each other.

The next station on the line is Brading, (Note: Mileage: 4 miles 55 chains (7.5 km)) which has two platforms connected by a footbridge and a foot crossing at the southern end of the station, as well as a passing loop which allows trains running in opposite directions to pass each other. The original passing loop was closed and lifted in 1988, but was reinstated and brought back into use in 2021 as part of the line improvement programme; the second platform and the footbridge between the two platforms had been mothballed throughout this closure. The line then continues in a southwesterly direction towards Sandown station, (Note: Mileage: 6 miles 42 chains (10.5 km)) which has retained its passing loop; the station's two platforms are connected by a subway.

Beyond Sandown, the line is single-track for the remainder of the route. The penultimate station on the line is Lake, (Note: Mileage: 7 miles 24 chains (11.7 km)) opened in 1987, and the line terminates just over a mile later at Shanklin station. (Note: Mileage: 8 miles 29 chains (13.5 km)) Shanklin also used to have a second platform, which is now used as a flowerbed. Until 1966, the line continued further south to Wroxall and Ventnor (see History below).

The full line, from Ryde Pier Head to Shanklin, is 8 miles 31 chains (13.5 km) long.

== Services ==
As of April 2023, train services on the line run every 30 minutes in each direction between Ryde and Shanklin, calling at all intermediate stations except (usually) Smallbrook Junction. This frequency has been made possible by an additional passing loop installed at Brading during the 2020–2021 upgrade works; prior to the upgrade, services ran at an alternating 20/40-minute frequency.

Smallbrook Junction station is only open on days when the Isle of Wight Steam Railway is operating; when open, the station is served by up to nine trains per day in each direction between 10:30 and 17:00.

== Passenger numbers ==
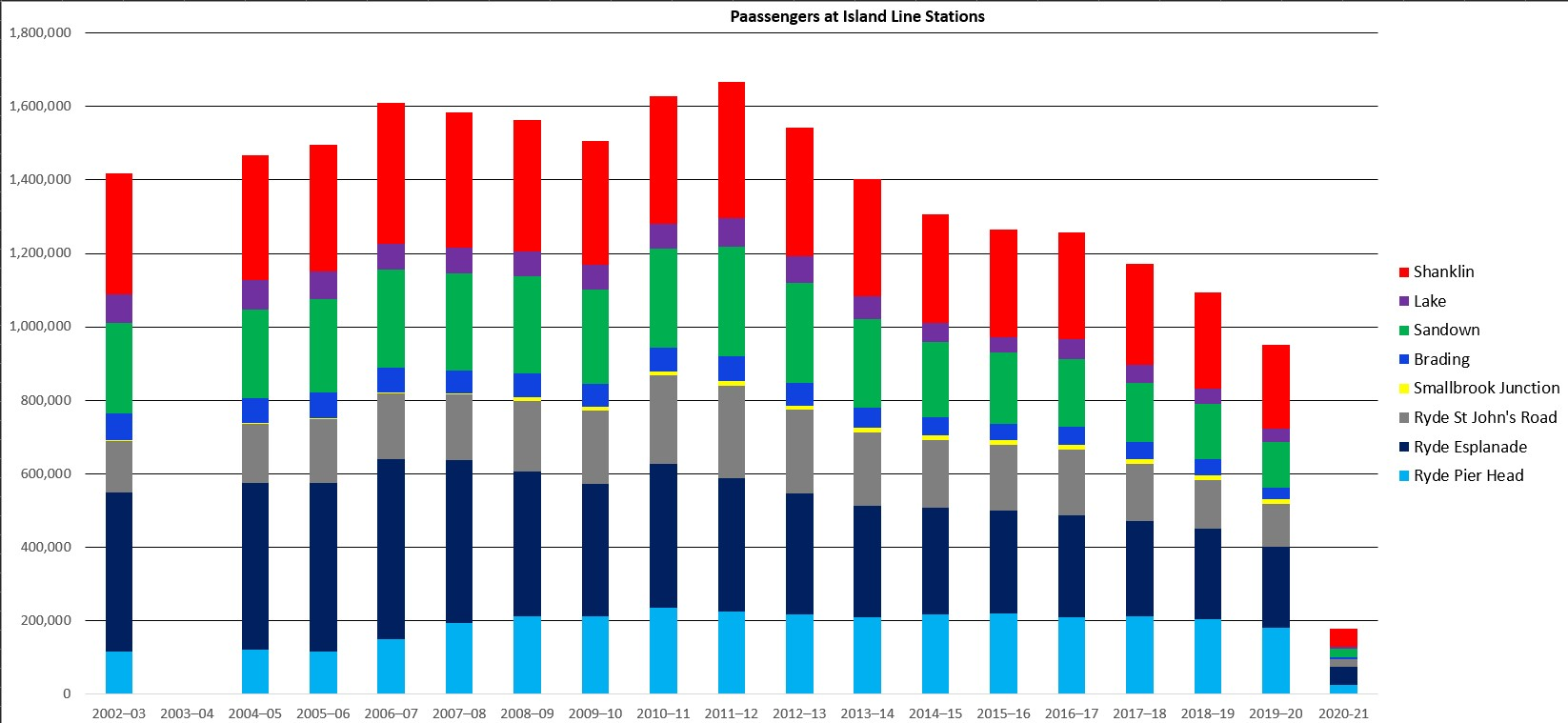
Passengers at Island Line Stations 2002 to 2021.

After privatisation, passenger numbers rose steadily from an estimated 1.21 million in 1997–1998 to an estimated 1.61 million in 2006–2007.

After the merger of the Island Line and South West Trains franchises in 2007, Island Line passenger numbers fell slightly from an estimated 1.61 million in 2006–2007 to an estimated 1.53 million in 2009–2010. They peaked again at an estimated record 1.67 million in 2011–2012, but since then fell to an estimated 1.31 million in 2014–2015. This was the lowest annual estimate since 1998–1999, and suggests passenger numbers fell by 22% in four years.

Station usage
Station name	2002–03	2004–05	2005–06	2006–07	2007–08	2008–09	2009–10	2010–11	2011–12	2012–13	2013–14	2014–15	2015–16	2016–17	2017–18	2018–19	2019–20	2020–21	2021–22	2022–23	2023–24	2024–25
Ryde Pier Head	116,652	121,387	116,812	149,226	193,714	210,604	210,604	235,156	223,542	217,272	209,734	218,060	218,410	210,006	211,794	204,154	181,060	26,300	68,646	92,786	102,938	
Ryde Esplanade	431,636	453,314	456,944	489,372	442,861	396,358	360,650	392,020	364,780	328,366	301,660	289,574	281,344	277,176	258,784	247,152	220,384	46,880	86,876	134,132	125,604	
Ryde St John's Road	140,242	160,891	175,208	178,869	178,914	190,796	200,976	240,046	251,694	229,450	202,188	184,924	180,220	179,822	156,850	132,174	116,138	21,058	38,994	65,396	57,222	
Smallbrook Junction	2,995	3,087	2,716	2,965	4,363	9,672	10,170	11,472	11,478	10,832	11,408	11,230	12,134	12,768	12,670	12,920	12,352	1,268	4,658	8,024	8,174	
Brading	73,546	66,932	69,074	68,841	60,680	65,794	61,406	63,872	67,840	60,540	55,594	50,954	43,846	48,500	45,848	42,170	32,842	4,276	10,410	16,378	16,122	
Sandown	244,876	242,564	254,040	265,499	264,784	264,126	256,890	271,282	297,722	273,118	240,766	203,143	194,276	183,488	162,310	150,748	123,126	23,936	46,860	83,500	79,696	
Lake	78,279	77,995	76,364	71,465	69,350	67,162	67,584	67,656	77,772	71,566	61,840	53,006	42,310	53,786	47,602	43,236	37,574	4,378	11,574	21,000	19,384	
Shanklin	329,887	341,826	345,020	382,842	368,776	358,658	338,612	345,844	373,006	352,134	318,410	294,698	293,654	291,346	275,076	260,016	226,746	49,110	83,326	149,810	145,562	
The annual passenger usage is based on sales of tickets in stated financial years from Office of Rail and Road estimates of station usage. The statistics are for passengers arriving and departing from each station and cover twelve-month periods that start in April. Methodology may vary year on year. Usage since the period 2019–20 have been affected by the COVID-19 pandemic, especially the period 2020–23.

== History ==
=== Pre-grouping (1864–1923) ===
The line from Ryde St John's Road to Shanklin was opened on 23 August 1864, having been built by the Isle of Wight Railway. In 1866, the line was extended through to Ventnor. The line was originally built as single track throughout, with passing loops provided at Brading, Sandown and Shanklin stations.

In 1880, the London and South Western Railway (LSWR) and London, Brighton and South Coast Railway (LBSCR) opened a jointly owned line north from Ryde St John's Road. Under the direction of LBSCR Chief Engineer Frederick Banister, the building of the extension included a new tunnel and a third Ryde Pier to enable the line to reach Ryde Pier Head, which provided a connection with the companies' ferry services. When the LBSC/LSWR joint line opened, it was as a double track section from Ryde St John's Road station through to Ryde Pier Head. There was a scissors crossover situated on Ryde Pier to allow trains to access all platforms. Sets of crossovers were installed at St John's Road to enable trains to change from the joint line's left-hand running to the single-track sections on the Isle of Wight Central Railway's Newport line and the Isle of Wight Railway's Shanklin line (now known as the Island Line).

=== Southern Railway (1923–1948) ===
Following the Railways Act 1921, the Island Line and the other railways on the Isle of Wight became part of the Southern Railway. In 1926, crossovers and a signalbox were installed at Smallbrook Junction to extend double track operation from St John's Road. However, the signalbox was used only in the summer when traffic levels were high. In winter, the two lines from Smallbrook to St. John's Road reverted to independent single track operation.

In 1927, the passing loops at Brading and Sandown were connected to form a second section of double track.

=== British Rail (1948–1996) ===
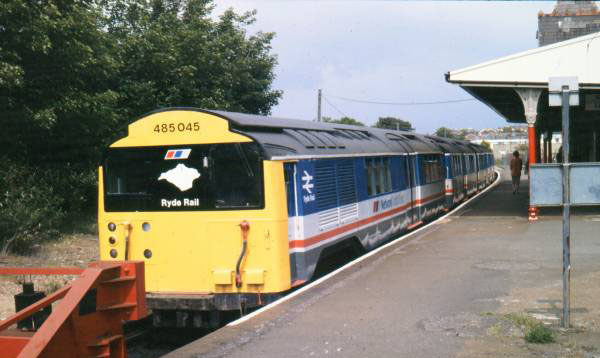
British Rail Class 485 485045 at Shanklin, in the late 1980s Network SouthEast livery with Ryde Rail branding

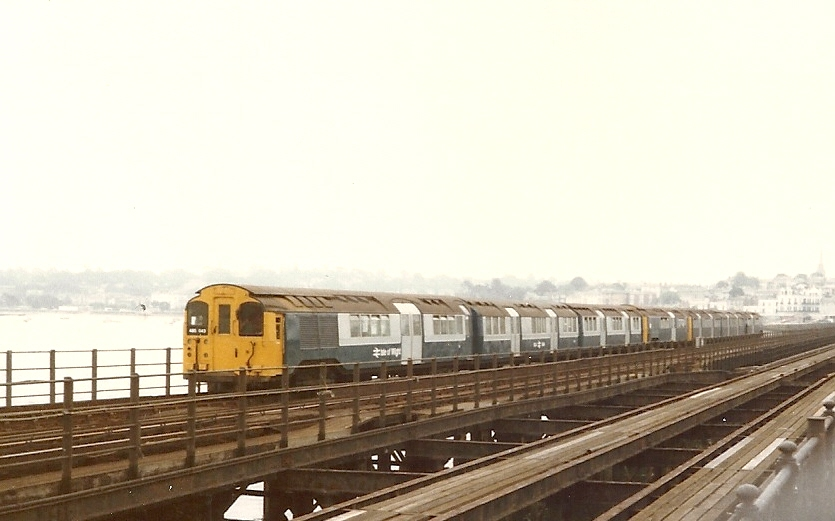
BR Class 485 train traversing Ryde Pier

In 1948, the Southern Railway was nationalised, as part of British Railways, later British Rail. The line from Shanklin to Ventnor closed in April 1966. Steam trains were withdrawn from Ryde Pier on 17 September, and the whole line on 31 December 1966. While the line was closed, the trackbed in Ryde Tunnel was raised to reduce flooding and decrease gradients, the rebuilding of Ryde Pier Head station was completed, and Ryde Esplanade station was also substantially modified. The line reopened in March 1967 following its electrification with a 660 V DC third rail system. The rolling stock introduced to the line was former London Underground 'Standard Stock', which had been built between 1923 and 1934, and was designated as British Rail Classes 485 and 486. In the 1980s, British Rail was sectorised and the line became part of the Network SouthEast sector. Services on the line were branded as Ryde Rail.

British Rail opened two new stations on the line - Lake in 1987, and Smallbrook Junction in 1991, which links to the Isle of Wight Steam Railway.

The double track between Sandown and Brading, along with the Brading passing loop, were removed in 1988. In 1989, the passenger service was branded as Island Line for the first time, as the name and logo was included on the "new" Class 483 trains' livery. However, this rebranding did not officially occur until 1994. The Class 483s had been introduced in 1989, and, like their predecessors, were former London Underground stock, dating from 1938.

=== Island Line franchise (1996–2007) ===
Following the privatisation of British Rail, the rights to run services on the line were put out to tender as a franchise. Uniquely on the National Rail network, the franchise agreement also required the successful bidder to maintain the railway line in addition to the stations and trains. Stagecoach Group were announced as the winner of the franchise and from October 1996 they operated passenger services under the name Island Line Trains.

In 2002, a form of automatic train protection was installed on the line. This involved the refitting of tripcocks on trains and the associated train stop trackside equipment at signals. This system is almost identical to the one originally fitted to the trains when in service on the London Underground, although it is in use only at signals protecting single-track sections of the route.

The Department for Transport designated the line as a community railway in March 2006, under reforms to help boost use of rural and branch lines in the UK rail network.

=== South West Trains franchise (2007–2017) ===
From February 2007, the Island Line franchise was merged with the South West Trains franchise on the mainland. Stagecoach was announced as the winner of the expanded franchise and operated Island Line as a South West Trains subsidiary. However, the Island Line name was retained, styled as Island Line Trains, and was promoted as a separate division on the South West Trains website.

Island Line Trains also repainted stations in a heritage scheme of cream and green, as part of a general station improvement package.

=== South Western Railway franchise (2017-2025) ===
In August 2017, the franchise was taken over by South Western Railway who have maintained the Island Line brand. On 25 May 2025, the South Western Railway Franchise ended and became nationalised.

=== 2020–2021 upgrade work ===
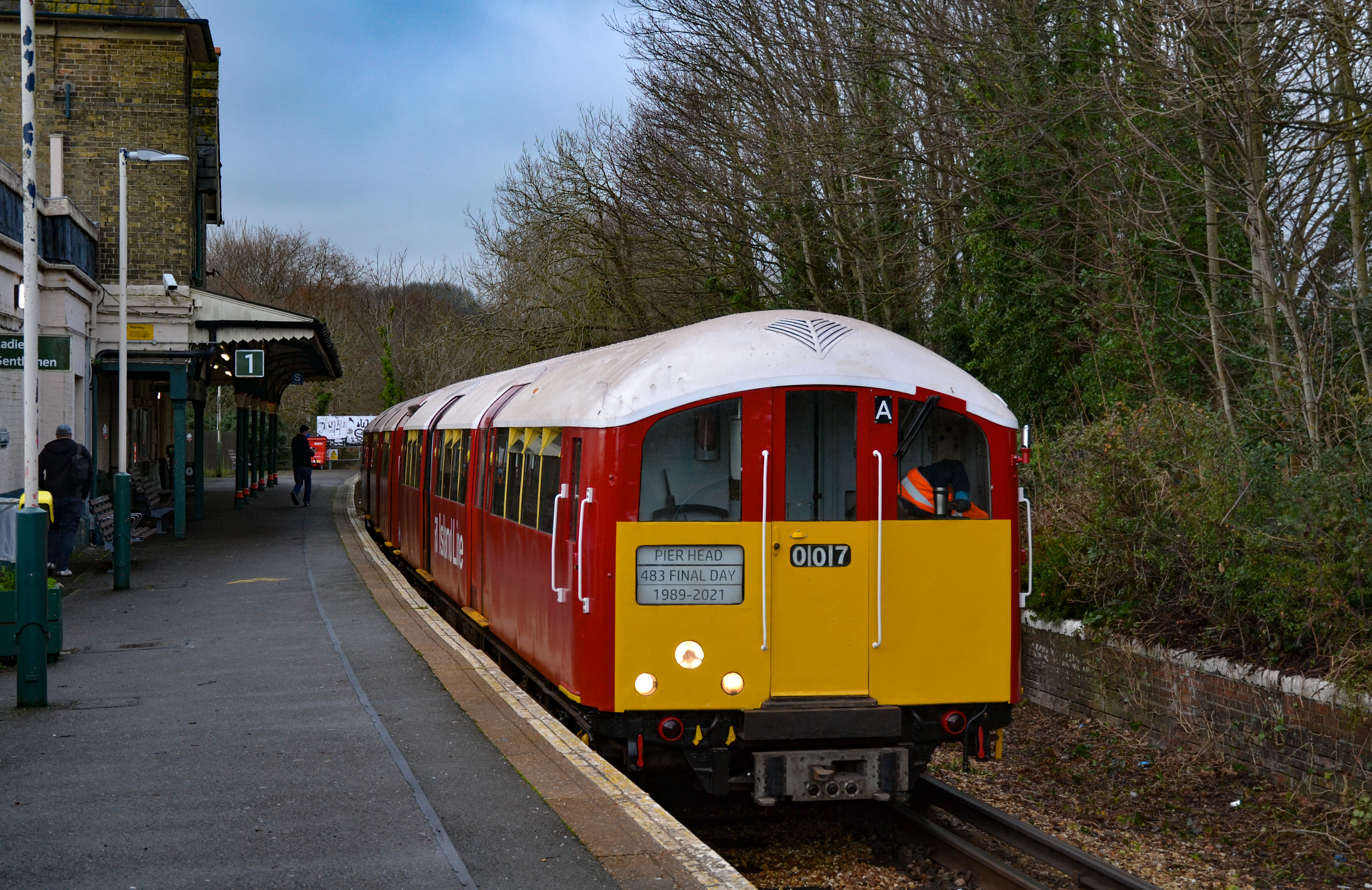
British Rail Class 483 483007 Jess Harper at Shanklin on the final day of Class 483 operations, 3 January 2021. This unit was transferred to the adjacent Isle of Wight Steam Railway after being retired.

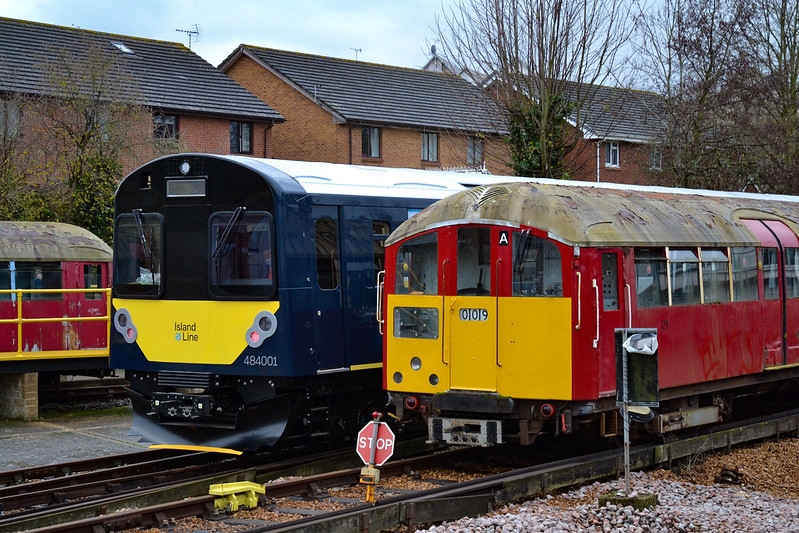
A newer Class 484 next to an older 483, showing the difference in height between them.

On 16 September 2019, it was confirmed that £26 million would be invested in the Isle of Wight's railways. This included the introduction of five Class 484 units built by Vivarail using D78 Stock bodyshells to replace the ageing Class 483 fleet, which had become unreliable to the point that services on the line had to be halved in frequency for around a month. As the new Class 484 trains would sit higher above rail level than the Class 483 they would replace, the track through most stations was expected to be lowered in order to prevent a large vertical difference between the train floor height and the platform height. At stations where this was not possible, platform height was instead due to be raised. The voltage on the third rail was to be raised to 750V DC.

The reinstatement of a long-removed passing loop at Brading was also planned in order to allow trains to run at even half-hourly intervals, with island-based stakeholders including the Isle of Wight Council and Solent Local Enterprise Partnership contributing £1 million. The plan as suggested in 2007-8 envisaged the passing loop at Brading replacing that at Sandown, which would have been abandoned along with the remaining double track within Ryde. However, the Programme Manager from South Western Railway has publicly stated that the option of running a 20-minute service will remain after the upgrade which implies that the existing passing points would remain operable. A total of 7,000 tonnes of spoil was expected to be removed during the work.

The original plan as announced in September 2019 was that most of the work on the track would take place over the winter of 2020–2021, with a "shuttle" train service planned during this period. Rail services were expected to be replaced by buses between Shanklin and Ryde St John's Road for 8 weeks in Autumn 2020 while the work was done, with a four-week suspension expected between St John's Road and Ryde Pier Head. However, delivery of the upgrade was delayed due to the effect of the coronavirus pandemic. In August 2020, it was announced that instead of two different closure periods, the line would close completely from 4 January until 31 March 2021 for physical upgrades including platform work and the Brading loop. Buses were to replace trains between Ryde Esplanade and Shanklin during the work with a minibus shuttle service to connect Ryde Esplanade to Ryde Pier Head, although the latter was not operated while the catamaran ferry was suspended. The rolling stock was also delayed due to delays at the manufacturer, and the first of the Class 484 trains was delivered in November 2020. In February 2021, it was announced that progress on the upgrade work and on the new trains had been further delayed due to the pandemic, requiring the line to close for six weeks longer than originally announced, meaning trains were not expected to run again until May. Subsequently, problems with software on the new trains delayed their introduction until later in the year. In August 2021, flooding caused damage at 16 sites on Island Line, with 200 tonnes of ballast from the mainland needed to carry out repairs. However good progress has been made with the testing of the trains and the infrastructure works are largely complete with only snagging items to deal with. The line reopened on 1 November 2021.

=== 2022–2023 upgrade work ===
Between October 2022 and June 2023, Ryde Pier Head was closed to facilitate a £17 million repair and upgrade to the pier, as it was coming towards the end of its operational life.

Ryde Esplanade was announced to have improvement works, to include a café, a link to Ryde Pier Head, a new waiting hall, a ticket office, an operations room and better staff accommodation. To begin works, the station was closed briefly in March 2023 and works were finished in August 2024. The site as a whole was named as Ryde Transport Interchange, however the train station is still known as Ryde Esplanade.

=== 2024–2025 upgrade work ===
Subsequently, in June 2024, it was reported that Ryde Pier would once again be closed for additional repair work. This closure was necessitated by the incomplete repairs from the previous work conducted between 2022 and 2023. On September 6, 2024, the Pier was closed until May 2025 to accommodate these repairs. Furthermore, the entire line was shut down for a week prior to reopening to allow for further engineering tasks and driver retraining. Additionally, the project exceeded its budget, totalling £20 million, which is an increase from the previously announced £17 million by South Western Railway and Network Rail.

=== South Western Railway nationalised (2025-present) ===
As of 2025, the Island Line on the Isle of Wight has returned to public ownership for the first time since 1997, following the UK Government’s broader initiative to renationalise railway services. Previously operated by South Western Railway (SWR)—a joint venture between FirstGroup and MTR Corporation—the line is now managed by the Department for Transport. This transition marks the beginning of integration into Great British Railways (GBR), a new public sector body tasked with overseeing both rail services and infrastructure. Transport Secretary Heidi Alexander hailed the move as “a new dawn for our railways,” signalling a shift away from the inefficiencies of privatisation toward a more unified and accountable national network.

== Future ==
A number of suggestions have been made for the future of the railway, which faces long-standing issues such as the cost of maintaining Ryde Pier. Proposals for the route have ranged from total closure – something also explored in the 1960s – to major rebuilding as light rail.

=== Past proposals ===
In the mid-1990s it was proposed to reopen the line south of Shanklin, to the original terminus at Ventnor. Despite the high costs involved, the island's MP in 2018 called for feasibility studies on this project and on the prospect of trains running between Ryde and Newport using a mix of the existing heritage railway and a rebuilt section of line between Wooton and Newport.

Other proposals put forward for the future of the railway line have included converting the line to a guided busway, something considered in 2005, and the late 2010s as part of a consultation on the line's future. The first plan for a Solent tunnel to connect the island's railways to the mainland network was authorised in the early 20th century and although work to build a rail tunnel has never started, this proposal has resurfaced several times in more recent history.

There have also been proposals to rebuild the line as a light rail route at several points, which would potentially allow for extension into Shanklin and other town centres, the most recent being after a 2016 review of the route by transport expert Christopher Garnett commissioned by the Isle of Wight Council. It suggested converting the route with the third rail replaced with overhead lines and the remaining double-track singled with just passing loops provided. It was reported that ten T-69 trams which were built in 1999, and had previously operated on the Midland Metro, could be re-used for this scheme. The Isle of Wight Council's Local Transport Plan previously mentioned that any improvements to the railway should ensure compatibility with the currently-shelved South Hampshire Rapid Transit scheme. None of these light rail ideas have been progressed.

The Railway Magazine reported that a meeting took place on 11 February 2015 which covered a relaxation of public railway regulation and safety standards as well as transferring the line to a Social Enterprise Company. According to RM, people present at the meeting included Claire Perry (Rail Minister), Andrew Turner (MP for the Isle of Wight), Nick Finney (Turner's transport advisor) and local councillors. News of the meeting gave rise to local controversy.

=== 2020 Ideas Fund ===
On 23 May 2020, the Department for Transport announced that approval had been given to investigate the possible reinstatement of some or all of the tracks between Shanklin and Ventnor and Ryde and Newport. It was one of ten schemes across UK approved for more study under an "Ideas Fund". The feasibility studies into reopening the two rail routes began in January 2021.

In July 2021, an outline case was submitted by the Isle of Wight Council to the Department for Transport, seeking funding for a £67 million project to study the feasibility of restoring the link between the existing Ryde to Shanklin line and the island's main town, Newport, running via Blackwater. The trackbed of this line "remains very largely intact", making it the most viable line. The line, closed in 1956, was once part of a 55-mile network stretching across the island. Newport station was demolished in 1971. If it is approved by the government through the Restoring Your Railway programme, the next stage would entail the authority preparing a more detailed business plan. In June 2022, the Department for Transport posted a Programme Update of the Restore Your Railway (RYR). The Island Line branch line is listed under 'Schemes not progressing to delivery under RYR'. The Island Line proposal will be given detailed feedback including recommended next steps and alternative routes for consideration as appropriate.

== Rolling stock ==
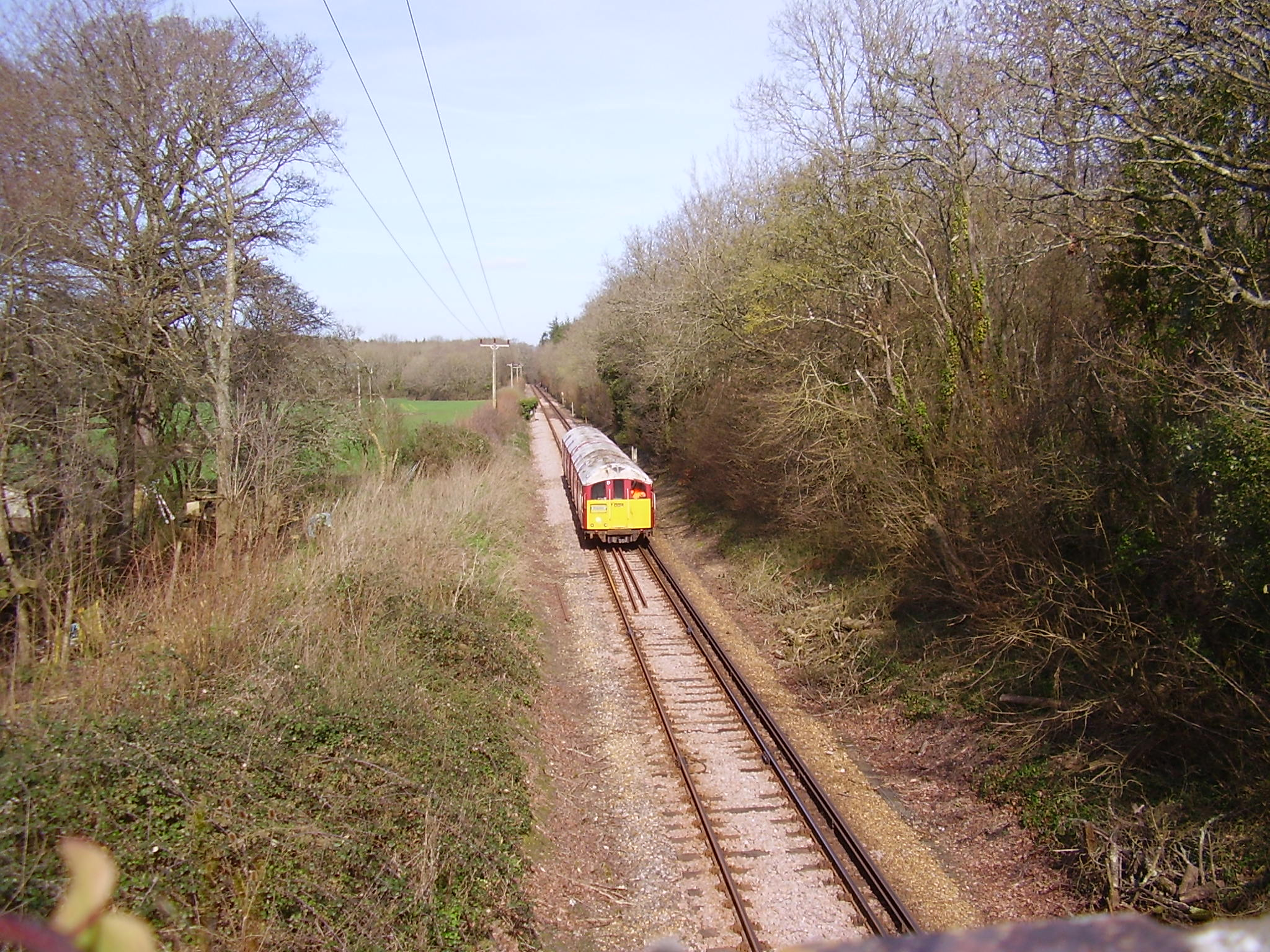
The line between Ryde and Brading

Due to the isolated and rural nature of the Isle of Wight's railways, rolling stock has tended to be made up from displaced older vehicles, rebuilt or modified as required. Following the work undertaken during the line's closure during the winter of 1966–1967, the ceiling of Ryde Tunnel is 10 inches (250 mm) too low for standard National Rail vehicle types to clear.

Since the reopening of the line in 1967, former London Underground Tube stock has been used. The initial trains were formed of so-called Standard Stock, made up into four- and three-coach sets (with one spare vehicle, normally kept at Ryde depot), designated "4-VEC" and "3-TIS" in the British Rail Southern Region electric multiple unit classification system. (The classification letters were a pun on the Roman name for the island, Vectis) Under the British Railways TOPS rolling stock classification system, these units eventually became Class 485 and Class 486. The cars transferred to the island were built at various dates between 1923 and 1934, and thus maintained a somewhat unwelcome tradition of providing the island's railways with among the oldest rolling stock running anywhere on the British railway system.

By 1992, the 485s and 486s had been replaced by newly refurbished London Underground 1938 Stock, designated Class 483 by British Rail.

In September 2019, it was announced that the entire fleet of 483s would be replaced by Class 484 trains, based on London Underground D78 Stock, during 2020. The stock is maintained at Ryde St John's Road depot. The Class 484s entered service in November 2021 after the ten-month works closure of the line, the elderly Class 483s having been withdrawn that January.

== Annual season tickets ==
Annual season tickets issued to and from the Island Line's stations are issued as Gold Cards. A ticket from Ryde Esplanade to Ryde St Johns Road was, for many years, the cheapest annual ticket in the area; even though many holders of such tickets never use them for the intended journey, the discount obtained over the year (one-third off travel during off-peak hours in the Gold Card area) may amply repay the cost of the ticket.

When the Gold Card area was extended to include the West Midlands in January 2015, the Ryde ticket was undercut by a similar short-distance ticket between Lichfield City and Lichfield Trent Valley.

== See also ==
- Island Line (brand)
