= Smallbrook Junction railway station =

Railway station on the Isle of Wight, England

Coordinates: 50.711°N 1.155°W

Smallbrook Junction
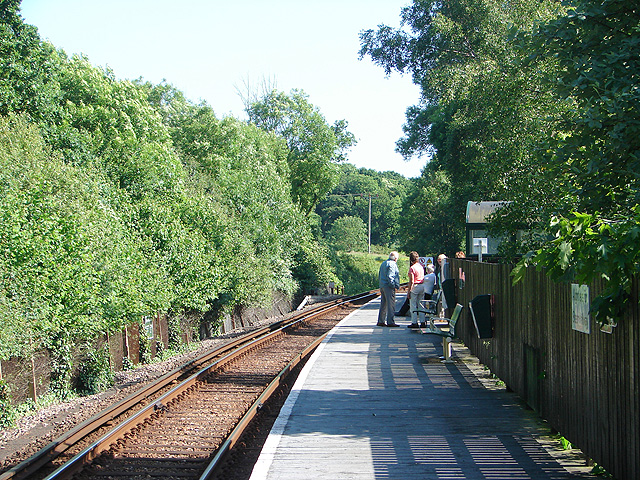
- Island Line platform at Smallbrook Junction

General information
- Location: Ryde, Isle of Wight; England
- Grid reference: SZ596906
- Manager: Island Line
- Platforms: 2 (1 National Rail, 1 Isle of Wight Steam Railway)

Other information
- Station code: SAB
- Classification: DfT category F2

History
- Opened: 20 July 1991

Key dates
- 3 January 2021: Island line Platform closed for upgrade works
- 1 November 2021: Island line Platform reopened

Passengers
- 2021/22: ▲4,658
- 2022/23: ▲8,024
- 2023/24: ▲8,174
- 2024/25: ▲8,978
- 2025/26: ▼8,520
Location
Notes
- Passenger statistics from the Office of Rail and Road

Smallbrook Junction railway station is a railway station on the Isle of Wight, England. It is unusual because it has no public access but exists purely to provide a connection between two rail systems.

== History ==
The steam railway platform

Prior to 1991 there was no station on this site, but it was still an important railway junction. "Smallbrook Junction" is the historic name, long predating the station. Between 1875 and 1926 there were two separate lines here, independently run by the Isle of Wight Central Railway and the Isle of Wight Railway. In 1926, following the island's rail network passing to the Southern Railway, a signal box and points were installed at Smallbrook. From then until 1966, the line was the Junction between the Ryde Pier Head to Ventnor and Ryde Pier Head to Cowes Lines, and was notable for only being operated as such during the summer months when traffic increased. The station itself opened on 21 July 1991 by British Rail when the Isle of Wight Steam Railway was extended to reach the Island Line, in order to provide a passenger interchange between the two. It is only served on days that both the Island Line and the Steam Railway are open, as there is no access either by path or by road.

In October 2000, flooding near the station washed away much of the track ballast on the Island Line. Due to the dangerous state of the line, and the damage caused to trains by related flooding at Ryde depot, Island Line Trains had to suspend their services for several days.

If the Isle of Wight Steam Railway achieves its long-term aim of extending to Ryde St Johns Road, it is likely that Smallbrook Junction station would close.

== Facilities ==
On the steam railway platform, there are toilets, a waiting room and a ticket office. There is a single metal shelter on the Island Line platform. The two platforms are linked by a sloping walkway.

== Passenger volume ==
As there is no way to exit the station, the figures below represent passengers interchanging to the steam railway.

Passenger volume at Smallbrook Junction
	2004–05	2005–06	2006–07	2007–08	2008–09	2009–10	2010–11	2011–12	2012–13	2013–14	2014–15	2015–16	2016–17	2017–18	2018–19	2019–20	2020–21	2021–22	2022–23	2023–24	2024–25
Entries and exits	3,087	2,716	2,965	4,363	9,672	10,170	11,472	11,478	10,832	11,408	11,230	12,134	12,768	12,670	12,920	12,352	1,268	4,658	8,024	8,174	8,978

The statistics cover twelve month periods that start in April.

== Services ==
On days when the steam railway operates, there is a service of 3 trains every 2 hours in both directions between approximately 10:30 and 16:30.

Preceding station	Island Line	Following station
Ryde St John's Road towards Ryde Pier Head	Island Line	Brading towards Shanklin
Heritage services
Terminus	Isle of Wight Steam Railway	Ashey towards Wootton

== Bibliography ==
- Caton, Peter (2018). Remote Stations. Leicestershire: Matador. ISBN 978-1-78901-408-2.
- Quick, Michael (2023). Railway Passenger Stations in Great Britain: A Chronology (PDF) (5th ed.). London: Railway and Canal Historical Society.
