= Ryde Transport Interchange =

Coordinates: 50°43′58″N 1°09′35″W

Ryde Transport Interchange or Gateway serves the town of Ryde, Isle of Wight, England.

The interchange consists of Ryde Esplanade railway station on the Island Line, the connected bus station and taxi ranks, and the nearby Hoverport. The existing facilities were due to be rebuilt from October 2007. Due to financial difficulties and contract checking, it briefly looked like the project might not proceed. From late November 2008 to October 2009 it appeared that the project was back on track, with work expected to take place, albeit about 18 months later than originally planned, however, in October it was announced that due to increasing costs and difficulties with the ownership of land with Network Rail that the scheme again looked as though it would be abandoned as money could be more easily spent on making immediate improvements to Ryde Esplanade. On 13 October, the Council's cabinet voted to close the scheme.

== Ryde Esplanade railway station ==
Ryde Esplanade station is unique on the island in being built both on land and over sea, as the northwestern part is part of Ryde Pier, while the southeastern part is on the shore. There are two platform faces, although only one is in regular use. Trains serve the station on their way between Ryde Pier Head and Shanklin.

== Ryde bus station ==
Ryde Bus Station
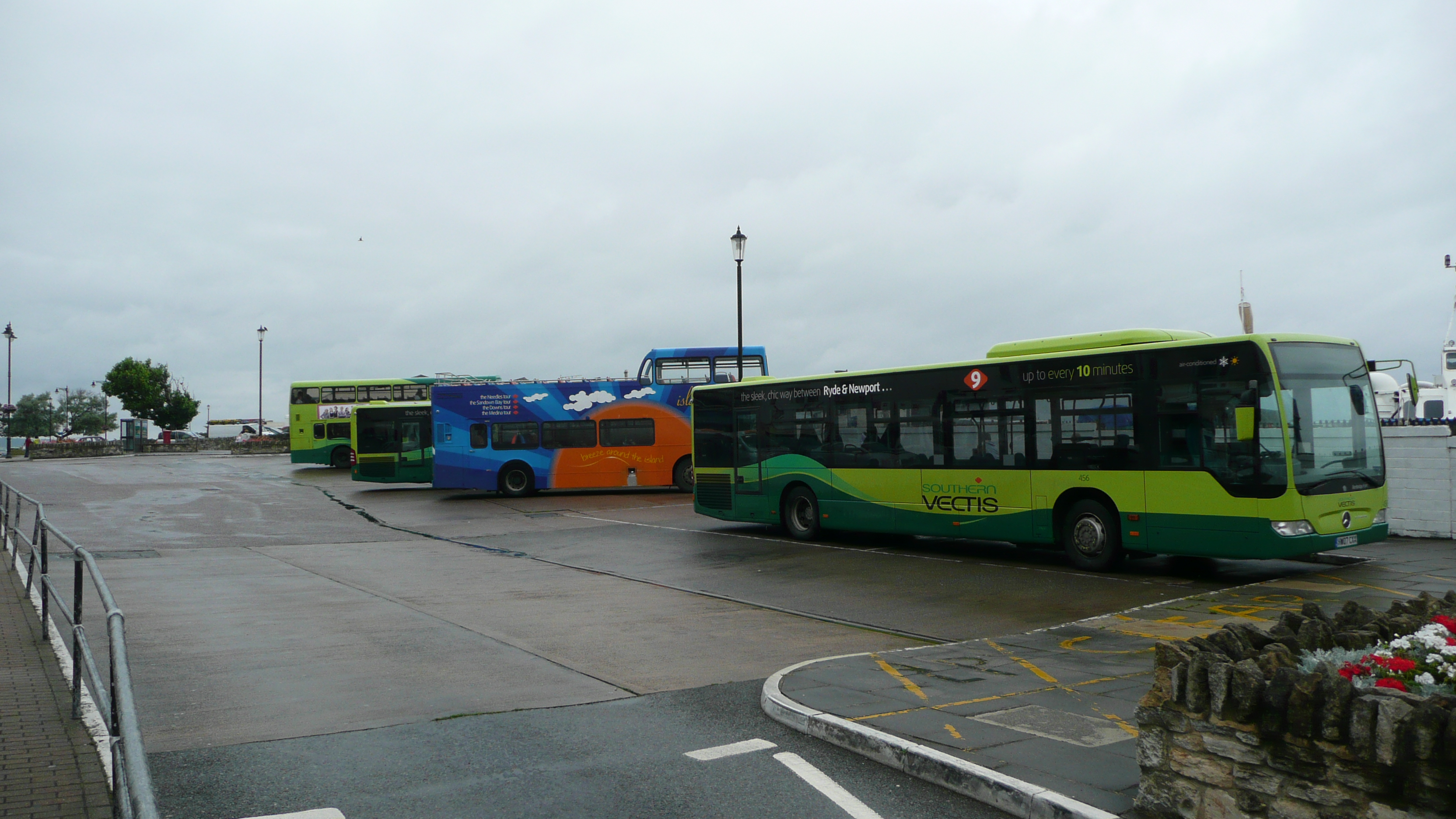

General information
- Location: Ryde; Isle of Wight
- Operator: Isle of Wight Council, Network Rail
- Bus operators: Southern Vectis
- Connections: Ryde Esplanade railway station Travel centre Ryde Hoverport
Location

Ryde bus station is located on the railway station forecourt, and it forms the only purpose-built bus/rail interchange on the Island. The bus station is on long term lease to Southern Vectis from Network Rail.

In December 2007, Southern Vectis moved staff facilities and passenger information out of the station to the Esplanade. This is where buses were due to stop while the interchange was being rebuilt, however this was later removed and buses remained using the main bus station when work was put on hold.

On 2 April 2009 all bus services were temporarily moved across the road for Southern Vectis staff to repaint the bus station in their two-tone green colour scheme to improve its appearance for the Summer season.

=== Layout ===
The bus station is of the saw-tooth design, where buses drive nose in to the stand and reverse back off. It is the only bus station on the island that is completely to this design. Buses enter the station from the eastbound side of the esplanade, and the bus stands are in front of them. On the left are two spaces where buses reverse in to lay over between duties. There are eight stands, lettered A—H. In front of the stands is a sheltered waiting area. On the left, it is large and houses the entrance to the railway station, with bus information available in racks and displayed on the walls. The roof gets smaller the further along to the right of the bus station it goes, and there is no roof for the last couple of stands (G and H).

On the far side from the entrance, beside the bridge to the hoverport, there are an additional two places where buses lay over. When buses exit the bus station from their stands, they pass the spaces and leave at this end, back onto the eastbound Esplanade. Due to the central reservation, buses have to continue along the road and turn around on a roundabout to come back and go up George Street.

The bus station is relatively busy, and until 19/20 December 2009 there was only one stand for route 9. When two arrived at the same time, one went to the other side of the bus station on another stand, and then reversed all the way back along when the stand became free. Without a condition to use the hazard warning lights when reversing, this was sometimes quite hazardous. Over the weekend on 19/20 December, with the new Southern Vectis timetable, the stands were rearranged. Route 9 gained two stands, one for the Staplers leg, and the other for Fairlee (ironically after the frequency was decreased), and routes 2 and 3 were given a stand each.

== Other transport links ==
Also adjacent to the station is the Hovertravel hovercraft terminal, although at present the connection involves a footbridge over the railway. There are also taxi ranks outside the Bus Station. The entire interchange complex is due to be rebuilt, and was due to start in 2008, to upgrade the facilities and replace some of the existing ageing buildings. However, the plans have stalled and since the original proposals were accepted, construction prices have risen, meaning that the plans may be shelved or scaled down if additional funds cannot be raised.

== Gallery ==
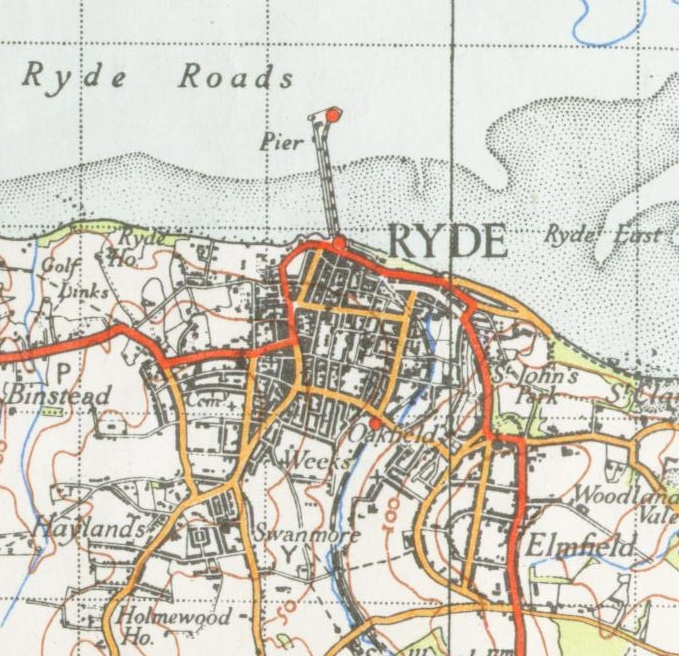
A 1945 Ordnance Survey map of Ryde showing the location of the Ryde Pier Head, Ryde Esplanade and Ryde St John's Road stations

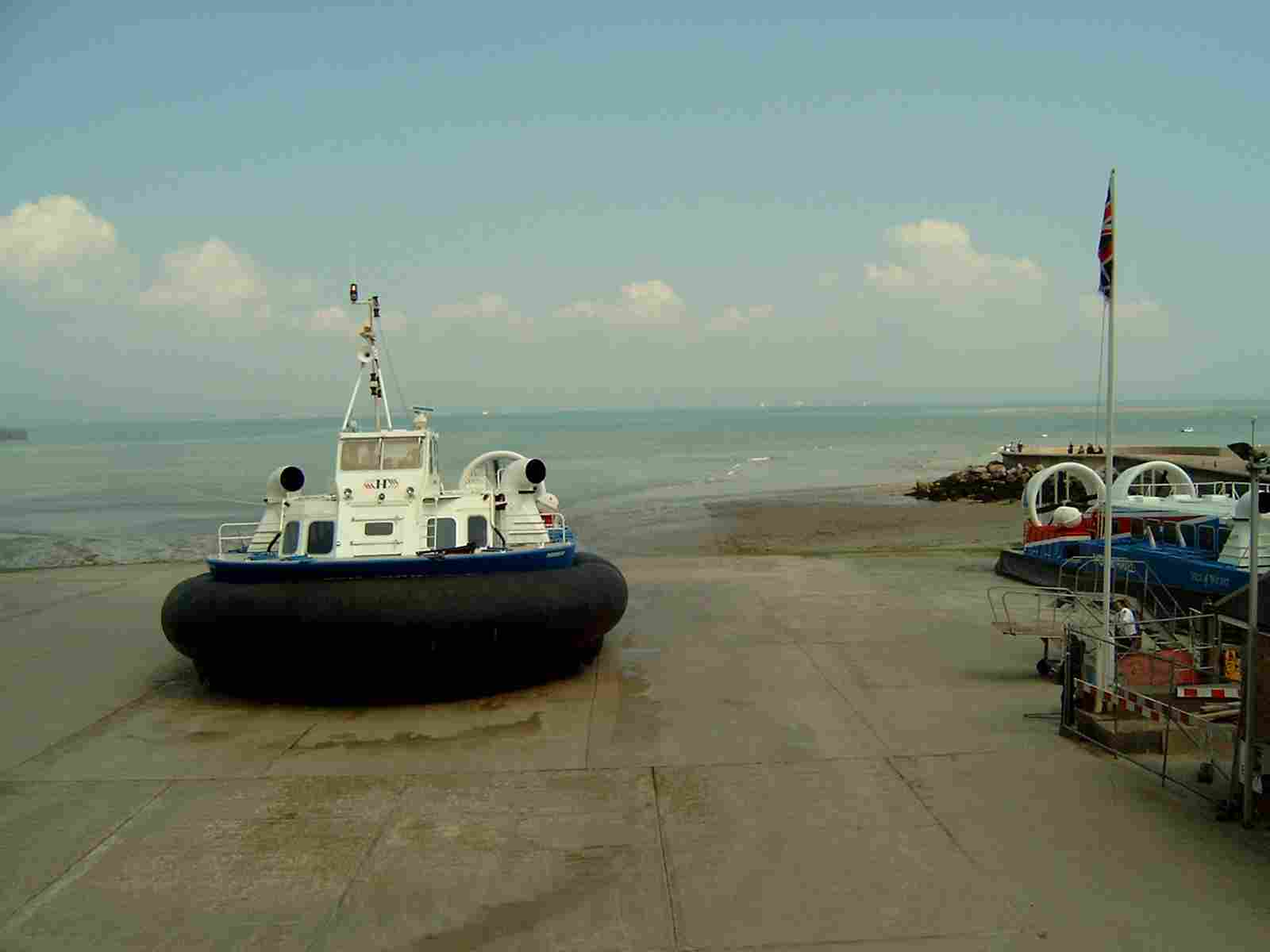
Ryde Hoverport is located across the railway line, with Hovertravel Hovercraft services running to Southsea in around 10 minutes.

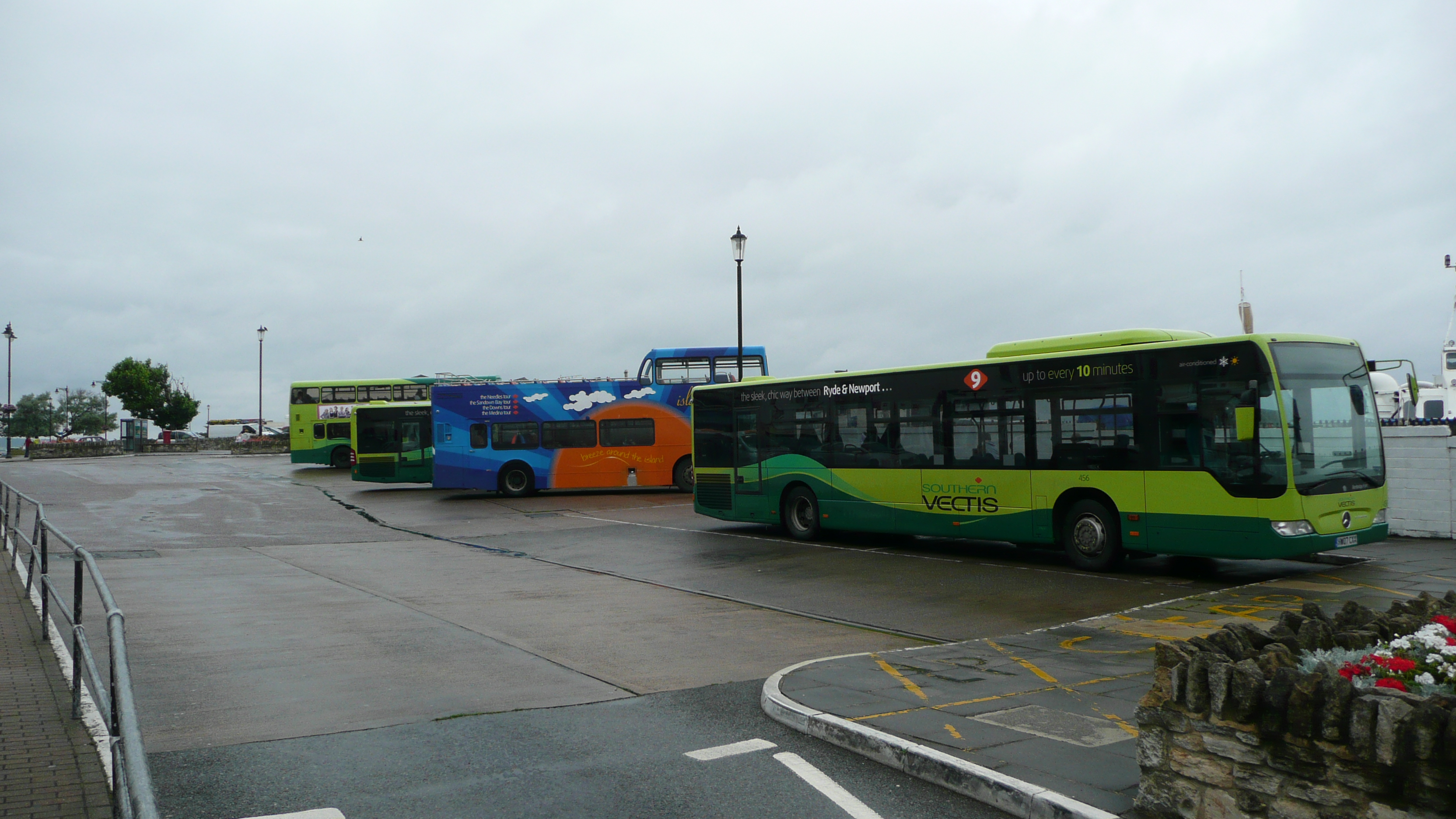
A view of the bus station section of the interchange. Set up in a saw-tooth arrangement, buses arrive forwards and reverse off the stand.

== See also ==
- Island Line – The railway line.
- Southern Vectis – The Isle of Wight's dominant bus company.
