= Ryde Pier =

Pier in the Isle of Wight, England

Coordinates: 50.736721°N 1.160623°W

- Ryde Pier in October 2026
- Type: Working pier with landing stages and railway
- Carries: Cars and Island Line trains
- Spans: The Solent
- Location: Ryde, Isle of Wight
- Official name: Ryde Pier
- Owner: Wightlink (road) / Network Rail (railway)

Characteristics
- Total length: 745 yards (681 m)

History
- Designer: John Kent of Southampton
- Opening date: 26 July 1814

Ryde Pier is an early 19th century pier serving the town of Ryde, on the Isle of Wight, off the south coast of England. It is the world's oldest seaside pleasure pier. Ryde Pier Head railway station is at the sea end of the pier, and Ryde Esplanade railway station at the land end, both served by Island Line trains.

== Before the pier ==
Before the pier was built, passengers had the uncomfortable experience of coming ashore on the back of a porter and then, depending on the state of the tide, having to walk as far as half a mile across wet sand before reaching the town. The need for a pier was obvious, especially if the town was to attract the wealthy and fashionable visitors who were beginning to patronise other seaside resorts.

== The original pier ==
Ryde Pier Act 1812
- Act of Parliament
- Parliament of the United Kingdom
- Long title: An Act for making a Pier and Landing Place at Ryde, in the Isle of Wight.
- Citation: 52 Geo. 3. c. cxcvi

Dates
- Royal assent: 13 July 1812

Text of statute as originally enacted

The pier was designed by John Kent of Southampton. It was authorised by the Ryde Pier Act 1812 (52 Geo. 3. c. cxcvi), and its foundation stone laid on 29 June 1813. The pier opened on 26 July 1814, with, as it still has, a timber-planked promenade. The structure was originally wholly timber and measured 576 yards (527 m). By 1833, extensions took the overall length to 745 yards (681 m). It is this pre-Victorian structure that has, with some modifications, carried pedestrians and vehicles ever since.

== Additions ==
Ryde Pier Tramways Act 1865
- Act of Parliament
- Parliament of the United Kingdom
- Long title: An Act to authorize the Ryde Pier Company to construct certain Tramways at Ryde in the Isle of Wight; and for other Purposes.
- Citation: 28 & 29 Vict. c. cccxlvi

Dates
- Royal assent: 5 July 1865

Ryde Station Act 1866
- Act of Parliament
- Parliament of the United Kingdom
- Long title: An Act for making a Railway and Central Station and erecting Slaughter-houses at Ryde in the Isle of Wight; and for other Purposes.
- Citation: 29 & 30 Vict. c. ccciii

Dates
- Royal assent: 30 July 1866

Ryde Pier Railways Act 1867
- Act of Parliament
- Parliament of the United Kingdom
- Long title: An Act for authorizing the Ryde Pier Company to make and maintain a Railway at Ryde in the Isle of Wight instead of Tramways authorized to be made by them there; for giving effect to an Agreement between that Company and the Ryde Station Company; and for other Purposes.
- Citation: 30 & 31 Vict. c. lix

Dates
- Royal assent: 31 May 1867

Text of statute as originally enacted

Ryde Pier Railway Extension Act 1870
- Act of Parliament
- Parliament of the United Kingdom
- Long title: An Act to enable the Ryde Pier Company to extend their railway to the station of the Isle of Wight Railway at Ryde; and for other purposes relating thereto.
- Citation: 33 & 34 Vict. c. cxxxvi

Dates
- Royal assent: 1 August 1870

Text of statute as originally enacted

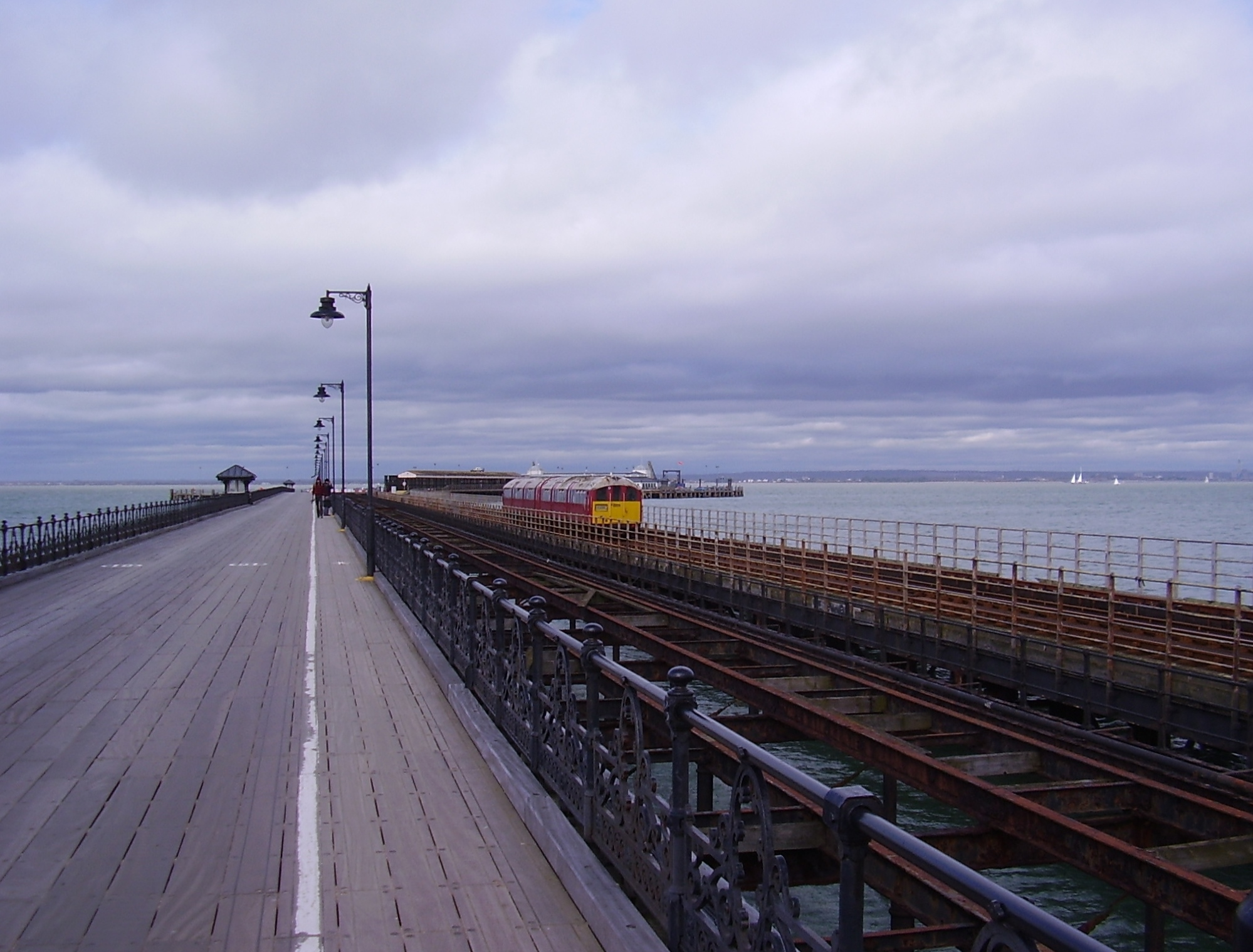
The "three piers" in 2017: the pedestrian and vehicle pier (left), the remains of the old tramway (centre), now converted to a pedestrian walkway, and the extant railway line (right)

A second 'tramway' pier was built next to the first, opening on 29 August 1864. Horse-drawn trams took passengers from the pier head to the esplanade. The Ryde Pier Tramways Act 1865 (28 & 29 Vict. c. cccxlvi) authorised the Ryde Pier Company to extend the tramway to the Isle of Wight Railway's St John's Road station.

The Ryde Station Act 1866 (29 & 30 Vict. c. ccciii) created the Ryde Station Company, and authorised the construction of a railway from the Isle of Wight Railway to St. John's Road. The Ryde Pier Railways Act 1867 (30 & 31 Vict. c. lix) and the Ryde Pier Railway Extension Act 1870 (33 & 34 Vict. c. cxxxvi) combined the two schemes into a single extension of the tramway, and permitted conversion to mechanically-powered vehicles. The extension was abandoned a decade later following construction of the railway pier. From 1886 to 1927, the trams were powered by electricity from a third rail, and from then until 1969 were petrol-powered.

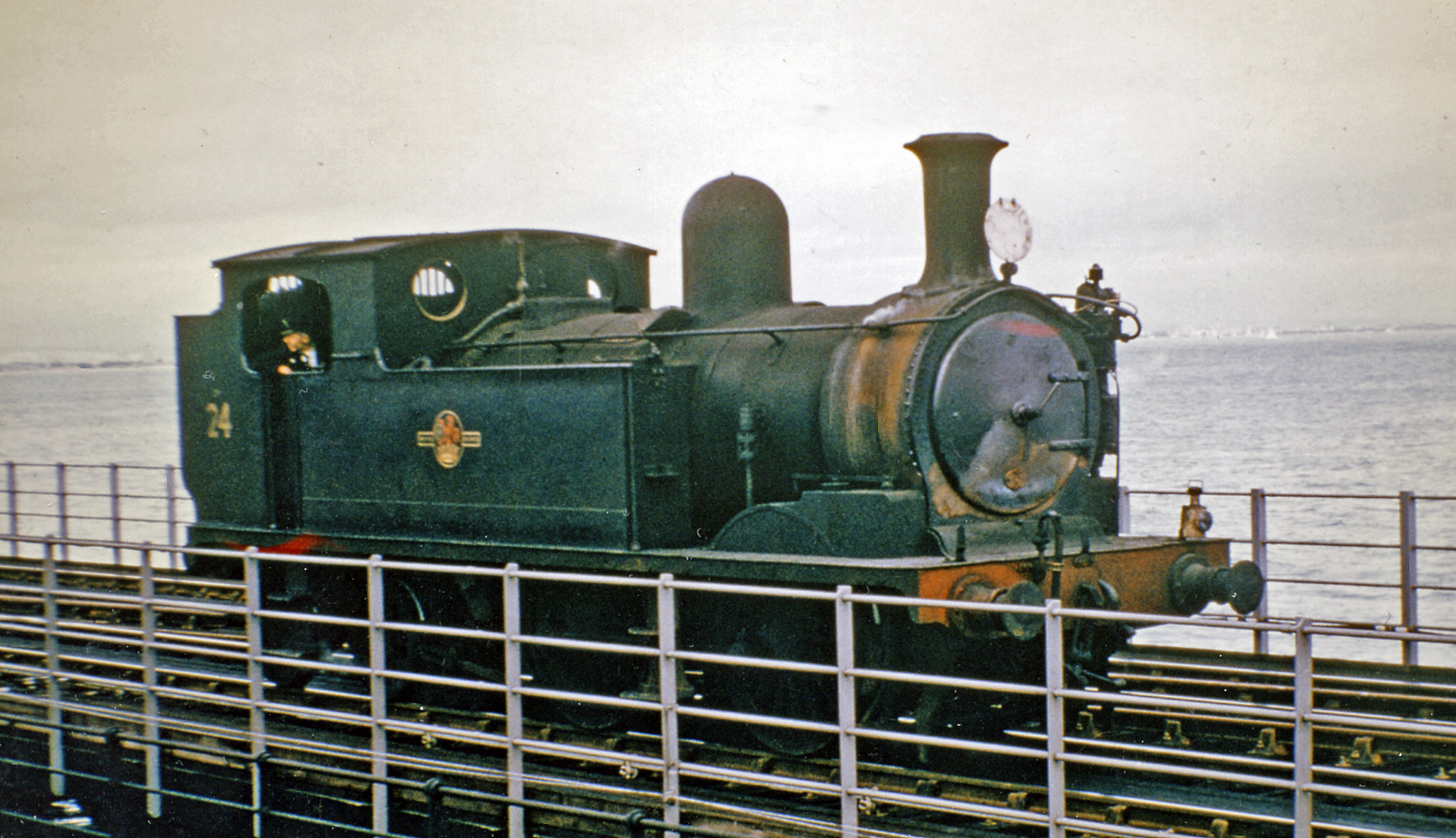
Ex-LSW 0-4-4T on Ryde Pier in 1965

On 12 July 1880, a third pier was opened, alongside the first two, providing a direct steam railway link to the pier-head. It was severely damaged on 18 January 1881, when four ships, the Eclipse, Havelock, John Ward and Lucknow, were driven through it, destroying 200 feet (61 m) of the pier. The railway was part of the Portsmouth and Ryde Joint Railway (a company owned jointly by the London, Brighton and South Coast Railway and London and South Western Railway), as far as Ryde St John's Road, to connect with their ship services to Portsmouth. However, trains were run by the independent Isle of Wight Railway and Isle of Wight Central Railway, who owned the tracks beyond St John's Road and operated services to Ventnor and Cowes via Newport respectively.

In 1895, a concert pavilion was constructed at the pier-head, and over the next sixteen years, the original wooden piles were replaced with cast iron. It was at Ryde Pier that the Empress Eugénie landed from Sir John Burgoyne's yacht The Gazelle, after her flight from Paris in 1870.

The Southern Railway Act 1924 (14 & 15 Geo. 5. c. lxvi) transferred the undertaking of the Ryde Pier Company (the road and tramway piers) to the Southern Railway. The Southern Railway already owned the railway pier.

The pier head was remodelled in the 1930s using concrete, and during the Second World War was used for military purposes, after various modifications.

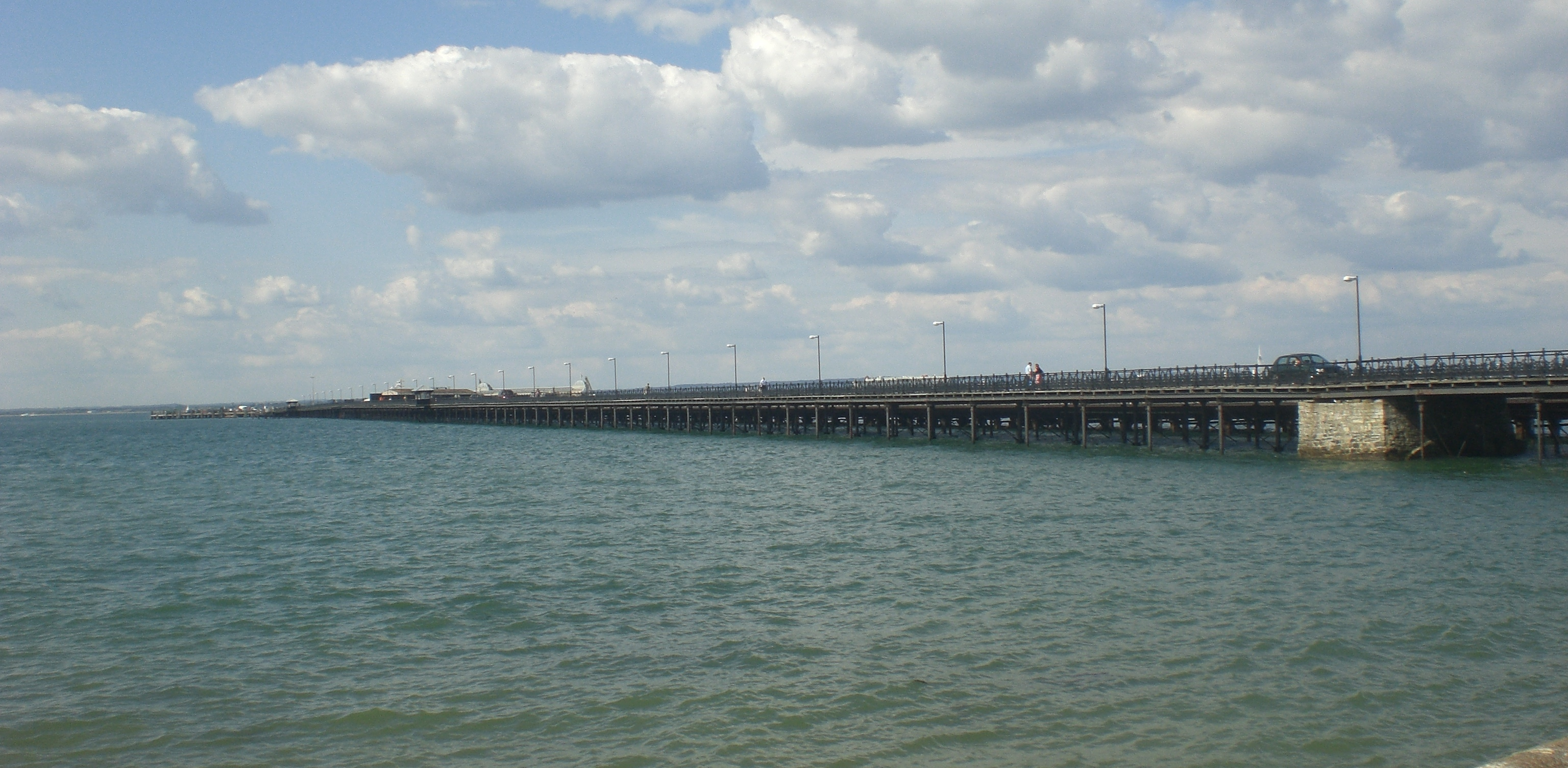
Ryde Pier shown from Ryde.

The concert pavilion was at the centre of the narrative in Philip Norman's book, Babycham Night; the author's family ran this venue when it was known as the Seagull Ballroom in the 1950s, and his relatives produced the eponymous perry. The pavilion was later demolished, but a few of the rotting piles are still visible around the edge of an extended car parking area constructed in 2010.

The tramway closed in 1969 and the structure was partially dismantled. This has left the disused and decaying tramway pier between the railway and promenade piers. The remaining structure has proved useful for temporary diversions, such as when a ship sliced through the promenade pier in 1974. In autumn 2010 the whole length was fitted with a temporary deck to provide a walkway, during re-building works on the Promenade Pier.

Ryde Pier was made a Grade II listed building in 1976. In the early 1980s, the road pier was transferred from British Rail to Sealink, and a modern waiting area, including some of the original buildings, replaced the original Victorian waiting rooms at the pier-head. Further modifications were made in 2009, including the provision of a conservatory-style refreshment area with views towards Ryde. In May 2011 the lighting columns on the Promenade Pier were fitted with Victorian-style brackets and lanterns.

Sealink (Transfer of Ryde Pier) Harbour Revision Order 1991
- Statutory Instrument
- Parliament of the United Kingdom
- Citation: SI 1991/10

Dates
- Made: 21 January 1991
- Laid before Parliament: 22 January 1991
- Commencement: 22 January 1991
Other legislation
Made under	Harbours Act 1964

Text of statute as originally enacted

The Sealink (Transfer of Ryde Pier) Harbour Revision Order 1991 (SI 1991/107) transferred ownership of the road pier from Sealink Harbours Limited to Wightlink, and made Wightlink the harbour authority for the waters immediately surrounding the pier.

Ryde Pier Harbour Revision Order 2010
- Statutory Instrument
- Parliament of the United Kingdom
- Citation: SI 2010/1900

Dates
- Made: 20 July 2010
- Laid before Parliament: 10 August 2010
- Commencement: 10 August 2010
Other legislation
Made under	Harbours Act 1964

Text of statute as originally enacted

The Ryde Pier Harbour Revision Order 2010 (SI 2010/1900) gave Wightlink the power to make byelaws to regulate the use of the road pier.

== The pier today ==
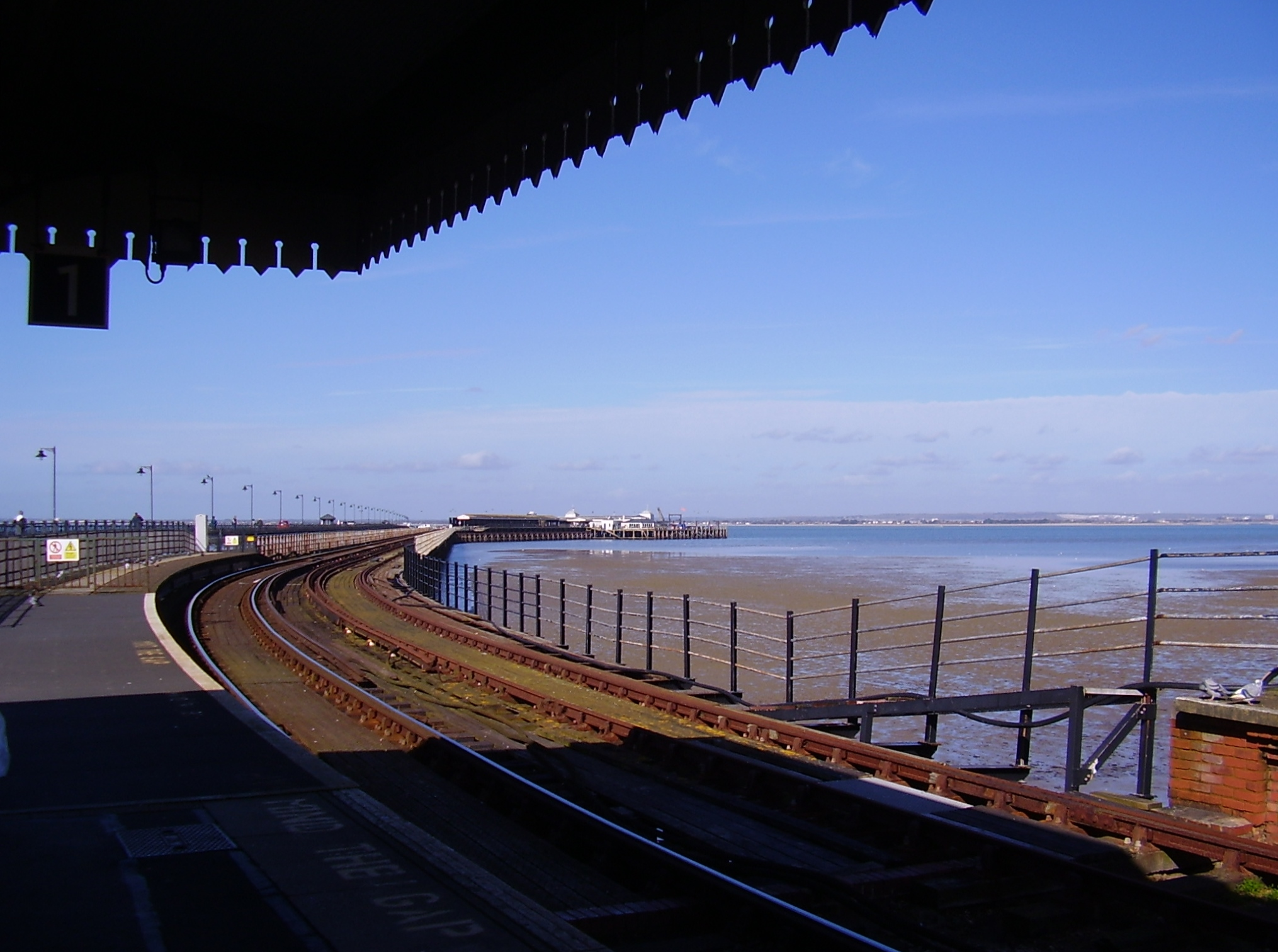
View along the pier from Ryde Esplanade station

The pier is still a gateway for passenger traffic to and from the Isle of Wight, with the Island Line train running from Ryde Pier Head railway station (at the pier head), via Ryde Esplanade down the eastern side of the island. The Wightlink catamaran runs regularly between Ryde and Portsmouth. It is possible to drive along the pier, and there is parking at the pier head.

Pedestrians can now walk the pier along the restored tramway deck in the centre, no longer having to contend with motor traffic driving along the same wooden walkway. From the pier head, there are panoramic views across the Solent to Portsmouth four miles away. On clear days, Fawley and its refinery can be seen away to the west.

In 2005, Ryde Pier featured briefly in the film Fragile, in an inaccurate scene where Calista Flockhart is driven along the pier after leaving a Red Funnel car ferry. In reality, the pier is only served by Wightlink craft, with Red Funnel services based out of Cowes and East Cowes, six miles (ten kilometres) to the north-west.

From August 2010 to March 2011, Ryde Pier was closed to vehicles to allow structural repairs underneath the promenade pier, which had failed a regular inspection by Trant Engineering Limited (Mechanical, Electrical and Civil Engineers). The pier remained open to pedestrians, who from October 2010 used temporary decking on the tramway pier. Some Wightlink foot passengers were allowed to use Island Line train services along the pier free of charge. Work to extend the Pier Head to allow for additional car parking continued during this period. The promenade pier then re-opened.

On the weekend of 26 July 2014, the pier celebrated its 200th anniversary. Network Rail's Strategic Route Plan in February 2018 warned that renewing the railway pier was "unaffordable" but failure to do so would be terminal to the operation of the railway, and as part of a wider programme to upgrade the Island Line have agreed to invest £5m into this project.

In 2020, as part of a wider regeneration of Ryde Esplanade train and bus station, a plan to reinstate the disused tramway pier as a pedestrian and cyclist route was announced with works due to be completed by the end of March 2023. Funding restrictions subsequently reduced the width of the new deck to 3m, which resulted in cyclist usage being eliminated from the plans. The tramway pier reopened in June 2023.

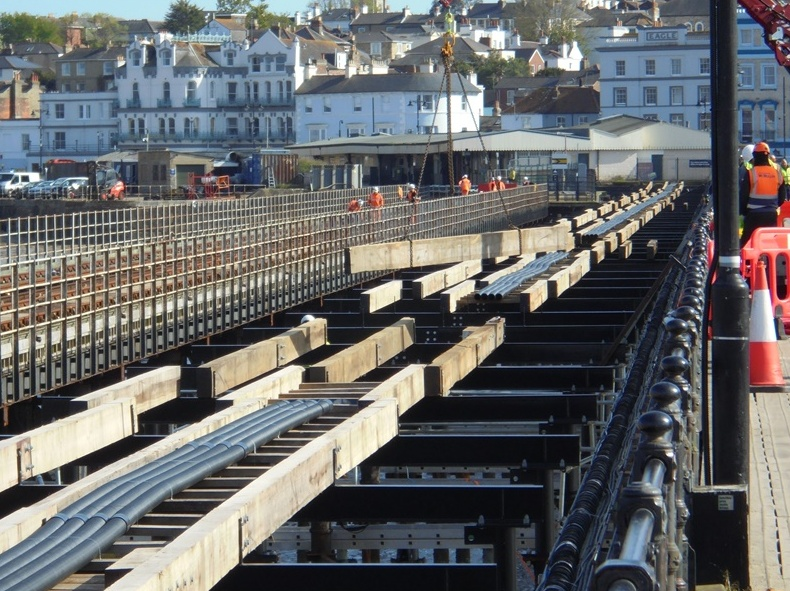

== Victoria Pier ==
For a few decades, Ryde had a second pier, the Victoria, a few hundred yards to the east. It was promoted by the Stokes Bay Pier and Railway Company to provide a landing for a rival ferry service from Gosport, and authorised by the Isle of Wight Ferry Act 1856 (19 & 20 Vict. c. cxii). It opened in 1864 as the main pier was getting its tramway. Being somewhat shorter than Ryde Pier, it could not be used at all points of the tide, and so offered little competition to the main Ryde to Portsmouth ferry services. When the Stokes Bay company was acquired by the London and South Western Railway in 1875, the ferry service ceased, and Victoria Pier became a pleasure pier only, with public baths at the head and a swimming platform at the dry end.

By 1900, the use of the bathing facilities was declining, and the second pier gradually became derelict. The austerity of the First World War led to it being considered redundant and a hazard, and in 1916, its demolition was authorised by the Ryde Corporation (Victoria Pier) Order 1916 confirmed by the Pier and Harbour Orders Confirmation Act 1916 (6 & 7 Geo. 5. c. xxxvii). By the 1920s it had gone. Until the construction of the marina in the 1980s, the outline of the shore-end abutment could be made out in the sea wall near Ryde Pavilion, and at low spring tide, the stumps of the piles could be seen in the sand offshore.

== Pier Hotel ==
The Royal Pier Hotel was built soon after the original pier, to serve its increasing trade and traffic. It stood on Pier Street opposite the bottom of Union Street for a hundred years, becoming a well-known local landmark.

Its position across the end of the steep final section of Union Street created a difficult 90-degree turn for drivers. In 1930 a bus descending Union Street took the turn into Pier Street too fast and overturned, killing several passengers and pedestrians, and damaging the south front of the hotel. At the inquest, the Pier Hotel was found to be a hazard to drivers, and instead of being repaired its demolition was ordered. By 1931, the Pier Hotel and the entire range of buildings back to the end of St. Thomas's Street had been removed, and Pier Street itself ceased to exist, becoming part of the Esplanade.
