= Portsmouth and Ryde Joint Railway =

UK railway line

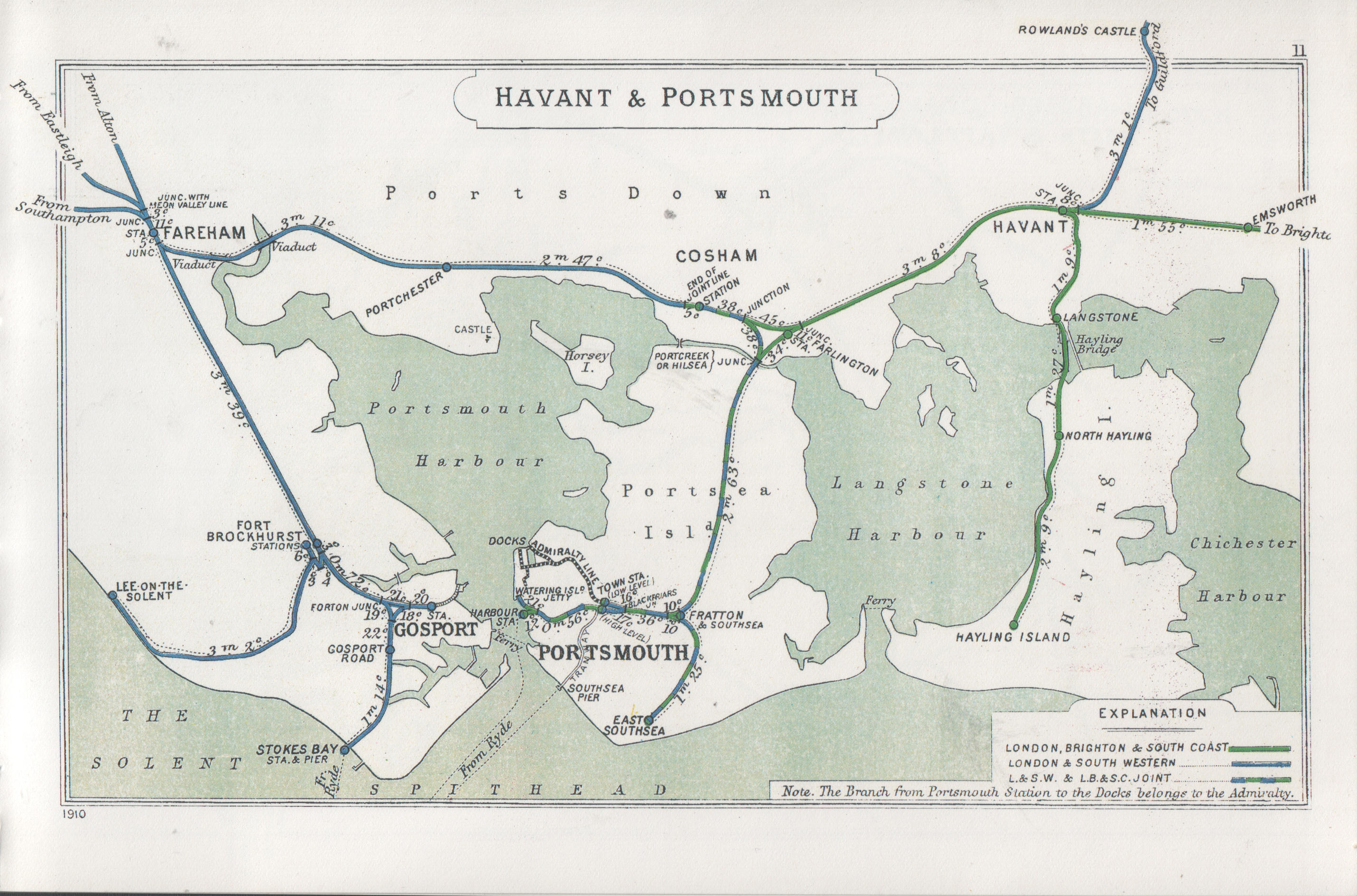
1910 diagram showing the mainland portions (centre)

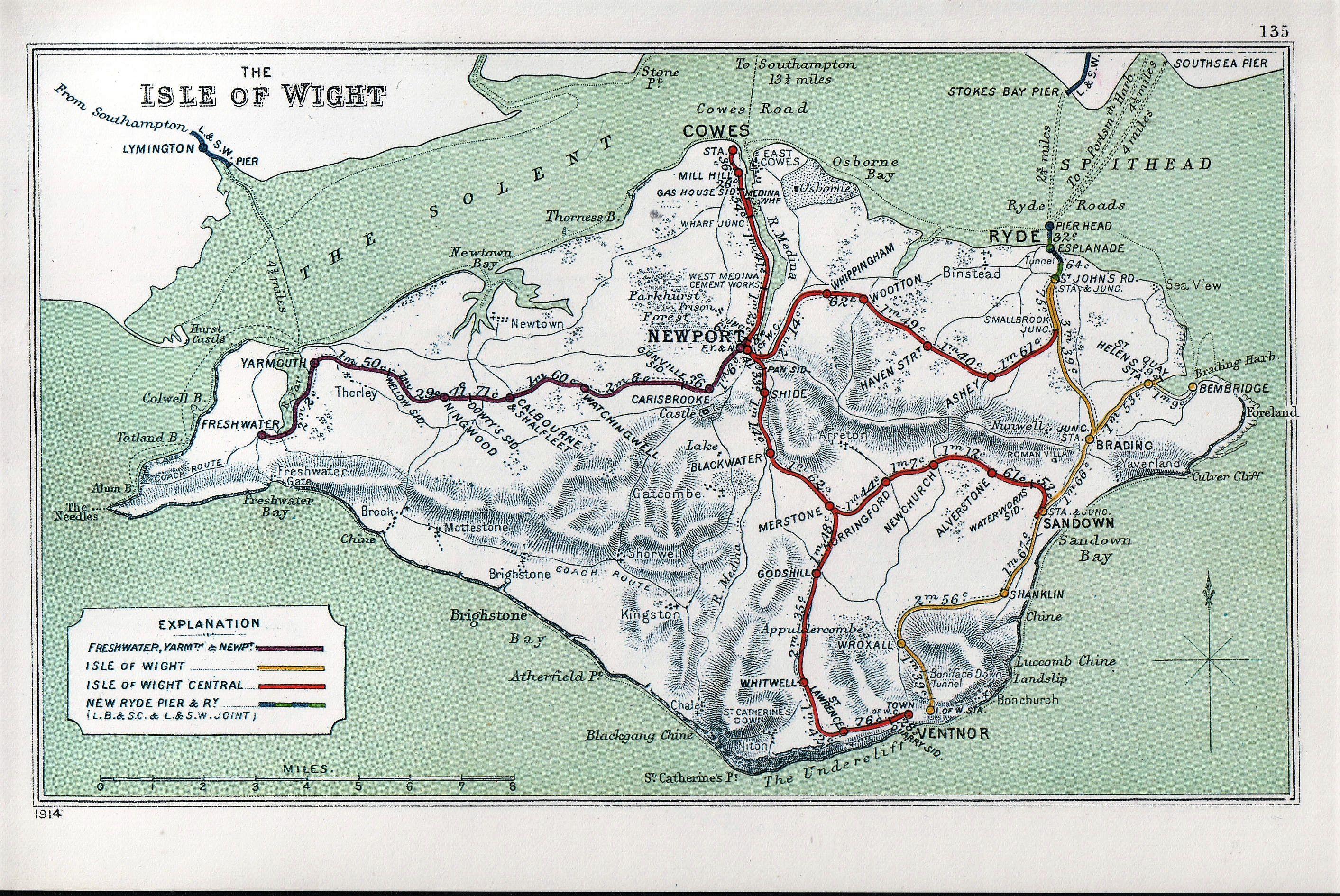
1914 diagram showing the Isle of Wight portion (upper right)

Railway Clearing House Junction Diagrams showing the Portsmouth and Ryde Joint Railway (blue/green dashes) and connecting lines

The Portsmouth and Ryde Joint Railway was a group of three railway lines in Southern England that were jointly owned and operated by the London and South Western Railway and the London, Brighton and South Coast Railway. The main line was between Cosham and Portsmouth Harbour; there was a branch from Fratton to East Southsea; and a line between Ryde Pier Head and Ryde St John's Road. The last-named section was isolated from the others, being on the Isle of Wight. The first section of line opened in 1847 and the last in 1885; the Southsea branch closed in 1914 but all of the other routes have since been electrified and remain open.

== History ==
The London and South Western Railway (LSWR) first served the town of Portsmouth by means of a line connecting Gosport to its main line at Bishopstoke, which opened in 1841. The Brighton and Chichester Railway (B&CR) had completed their line from Shoreham to Chichester in 1846. In August 1845, the B&CR was authorised to build an extension to Portsmouth. Shortly after opening to Chichester, the B&CR was absorbed by the newly created London, Brighton and South Coast Railway (LBSCR). The projected B&CR line was built by the LBSCR, opening from Chichester to Havant on 15 March 1847, and from Havant to Portsmouth on 14 June 1847. On 26 July 1848, two connections from that line to Cosham, forming a triangle between Farlington Junction, Cosham and Portcreek Junction, were opened for LBSCR goods traffic; and on 1 September 1848, the LSWR opened a line from Fareham on its Gosport line to Cosham and began running goods trains through to Portsmouth via the western side of the triangle; LSWR passenger services between Cosham and Portsmouth began on 1 October 1848.

The Portsmouth line was extended to Portsmouth Harbour, opening on 2 October 1876; Portsmouth station was renamed Portsmouth Town on the same day. In 1877, the LSWR and LBSCR were jointly authorised to build a new pier at Ryde, a railway line along that pier, and a connection from that line to the Isle of Wight Railway (IWR) at Ryde St John's Road. The line was opened between St John's Road and Ryde Esplanade on 5 April 1880, including a tunnel to the south of Ryde Esplanade; and to Ryde Pier Head on 12 July 1880. Although the line was jointly owned by the LSWR and LBSCR, its services were provided by the IWR from the outset and from 1 October 1888 also by the Ryde and Newport Railway (which later became part of the Isle of Wight Central Railway), until those companies were absorbed by the Southern Railway (SR).

The third component was the Southsea Railway, which ran from a junction with the main line at Fratton to East Southsea; this was authorised in 1880 and opened on 1 July 1885. Like the main line, this branch was worked jointly by the LSWR and LBSCR.

A large motive power depot was built at Fratton, in the angle between the main line and the Southsea branch. Construction commenced in 1889, and its main feature was a roundhouse-type locomotive shed containing a turntable of 50 feet (15 m) diameter. The LSWR and the LBSCR shared the turntable and most of the facilities, but each railway had its own offices, coal stages and stalls radiating from the turntable. Between thirty and forty locomotives from each company were based at this depot, being used on long-distance services to London, as well as shorter-distance services to places such as Brighton (LBSCR) and Eastleigh (LSWR). Among a total of 293 members of staff in 1926, there were 101 pairs of drivers and firemen. A breakdown crane was provided, and by nationalisation this was capable of lifting 36 long tons (37 t). LBSCR locomotives based at Fratton had the letter "F" painted on the platform angle just behind the front buffer beam; the LSWR did not use shed codes, and nor did the SR, but under British Railways, the code 71D was allotted in 1950, and by 1956 this was altered to 70F. In January 1947, 43 locomotives were allocated to Fratton, of which 23 were ex-LSWR, 18 were ex-LBSCR, and two were SR U class 2-6-0s.

The Southsea branch closed on 8 August 1914 as a temporary wartime expedient, but it was not reopened, and the track was removed in 1924. At the 1923 Grouping, the LSWR and LBSCR amalgamated with each other and with some other railways to create the Southern Railway, which thus became owners of the P&RJR. Apart from the Southsea branch, all of the lines of the P&RJR passed to British Railways at the start of 1948, and are still open.

=== Electrification ===
On 27 June 1935 the SR announced plans to electrify the route between Hampton Court Junction (near Surbiton) and Portsmouth via Woking; this included the portion of the former P&RJR between Portcreek Junction and Portsmouth Harbour station. Work commenced in October 1935, and was sufficiently complete to allow an electric train to reach Portsmouth & Southsea on 8 March 1937, and Portsmouth Harbour on 11 April. The full electric service began on 4 July 1937.

The section on the Isle of Wight was electrified in early 1967 as part of the scheme to electrify (using the 630 V DC third-rail system) the only railway line on the island not to have been closed – that between Ryde Pier Head and Shanklin, electric services commencing on 20 March 1967.

In 1988, British Rail obtained approval to electrify the route between Portsmouth and Southampton and between Fareham and Eastleigh, which included the remaining unelectrified portion of the former P&RJR between Portcreek Junction and Cosham and also the northern side of the Cosham triangle; the lines were energised on 14 March 1990 with services commencing on 14 May 1990.

== Extent ==
At its peak, the P&RJR had 7 miles 27 chains (11.81 km) of route on the mainland, including the Southsea branch and two short branches in Portsmouth: one from Blackfriars Junction to the terminal (low level) portion of Portsmouth Town station; and one from just outside Portsmouth Harbour station to Watering Island Jetty. On the Isle of Wight, the length of route was 96 chains (1.93 km).
