= Ryde Esplanade railway station =

Railway station on the Isle of Wight, England

Coordinates: 50.7331°N 1.1598°W

Ryde Esplanade
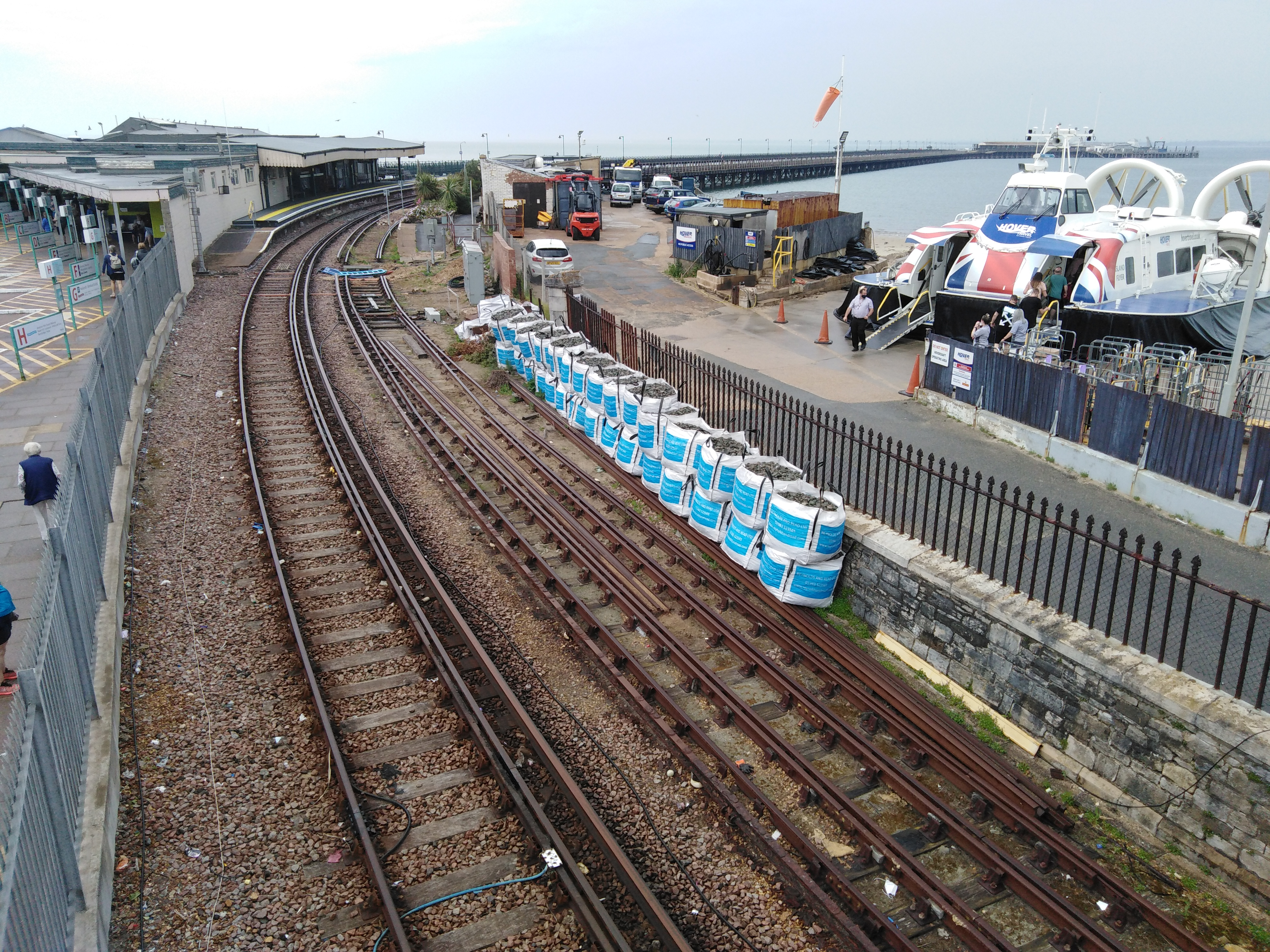
- Ryde Esplanade in June 2021

General information
- Location: Ryde, Isle of Wight; England
- Grid reference: SZ593929
- Managed by: Island Line
- Platforms: 1 (formerly 2)

Other information
- Station code: RYD
- Classification: DfT category E

History
- Original company: Portsmouth and Ryde Joint Railway
- Pre-grouping: Portsmouth and Ryde Joint Railway
- Post-grouping: Southern Railway

Key dates
- 5 April 1880: Opened
- 1 January 1967: Closed (for electrification)
- 20 March 1967: Reopened (after electrification)
- 3 January 2021: Closed for upgrade works
- 1 November 2021: Reopened

Passengers
- 2020/21: ▼46,880
- 2021/22: ▲86,876
- 2022/23: ▲0.134 million
- 2023/24: ▼0.126 million
- 2024/25: ▲0.130 million
Location
Notes
- Passenger statistics from the Office of Rail and Road

Ryde Esplanade railway station serves the town of Ryde on the Isle of Wight, and forms part of the Ryde Transport Interchange. Located on the sea front, it is the most convenient station for the majority of the town. Ryde Esplanade is also the location of the principal ticket office and all lost property facilities for the Island Line. The larger St John's Road station houses the area office and is next to Ryde Traincare Depot, where all in-house maintenance for the line takes place.

== History ==
A station has existed on the site since 29 August 1864, when a horse-drawn tram service began operation along the new Ryde Pier. This service, and the line it ran along, pre-dates both the railway line and the current facilities on the site. The tramway was extended to St John's Road in August 1871, but in 1880 this service was replaced by the railway line and current station. The tramway station was originally known as Pier Gate. Trams continued running under various power sources until after the Grouping of Britain's railways in 1923, right up to January 1969. The tram lines and the remaining terminus platforms for them are still visible at the western end of platform 1.

=== Stationmasters ===
- John Henry Astridge 1880 - 1884 (also station master of Ryde Pier Head)
- James Langworthy 1884 - 1894 (also station master of Ryde Pier Head)
- William Percy Froud 1895 - 1905 (afterwards station master at Portsmouth Town and Portsmouth Harbour)
- T.J.D. Russell 1905 - 1906
- George Henry French 1906 - 1930 (also station master at Ryde Pier Head, from 1913 also station master at Ryde St John's)
- Malcolm J. Bucket 1930 - 1931 (formerly station master at Fratton, also station master at Ryde St John's and Ryde Pier Head)
- H.E. Millichap ca. 1935 - 1941 (also station master at Ryde St John's and Ryde Pier Head)
- T.F. Thompson 1941 - 1949
- T. Rowley Cliff ca. 1951

== Facilities ==
There are two tracks through the station, and therefore two platform faces. The southern platform 1 is used for all regular passenger services, meaning that on departure trains may run in either direction. Platform 2 has previously been used for additional shuttle trains from the Esplanade to the Pier Head, but has fallen into disuse. Part of this second platform was due to be demolished in March 2007 under a separate Network Rail project. Access between the two platforms was by means of a subway. This subway is no longer open to the public and is regularly flooded to a depth of several metres. There is a canopy over platform one, while platform two has a simple shelter over the subway entrance. All passenger facilities, including the ticket office and access to Ryde bus station, are found next to platform one on the south side of the site.

== Services ==
All services at Ryde Esplanade are operated by Island Line using Class 484 EMUs.

The typical off-peak service in trains per hour is:

- 3 trains per 2 hours to Ryde Pier Head
- 3 trains per 2 hours to Shanklin

These services call at all stations, except Smallbrook Junction, which is served only during operating dates for the Isle of Wight Steam Railway.

Preceding station	Island Line	Following station
Ryde Pier Head Terminus	Island Line	Ryde St John's Road towards Shanklin
Ferry services
Portsmouth & Southsea Terminus	Hovertravel	Terminus

== Gallery ==
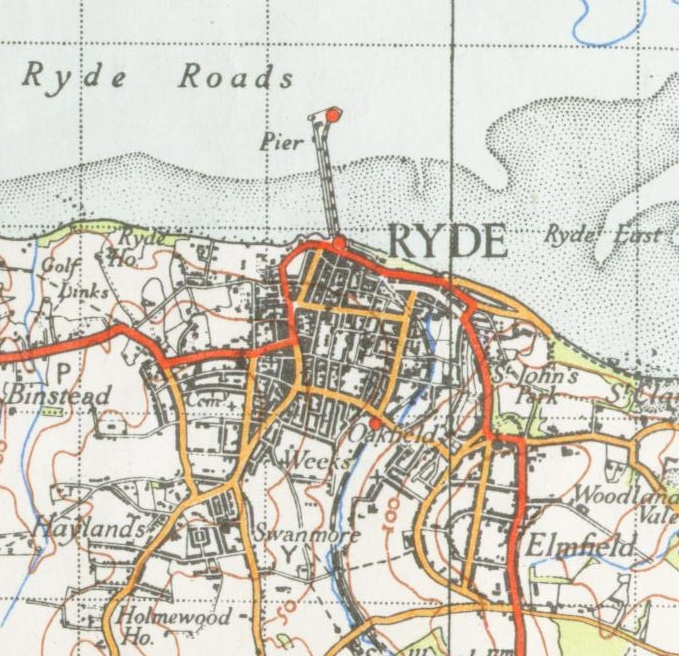
A 1945 Ordnance Survey map of Ryde showing the location of the Ryde Pier Head, Ryde Esplanade and Ryde St John's Road stations

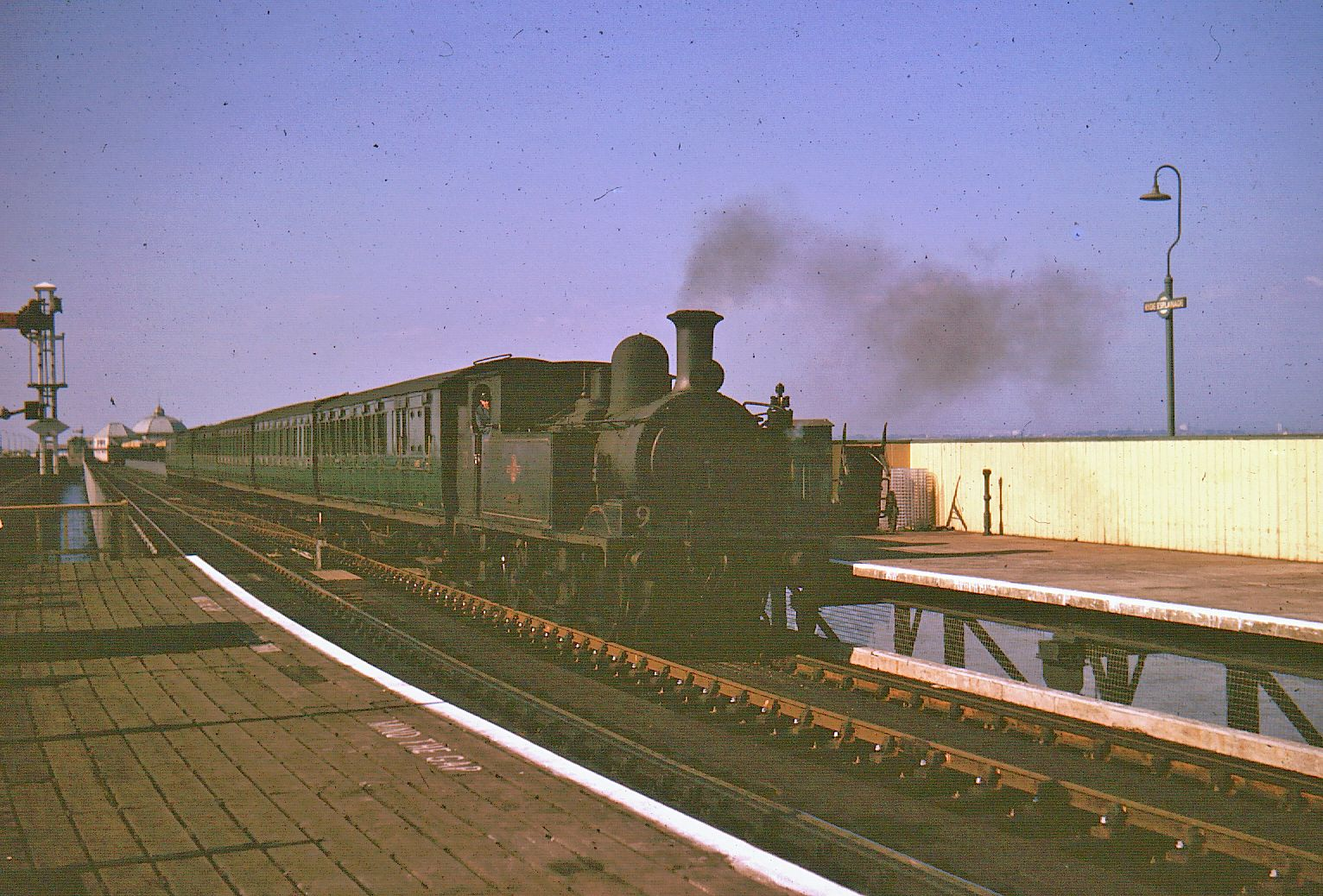
Ryde Esplanade station, August 1964

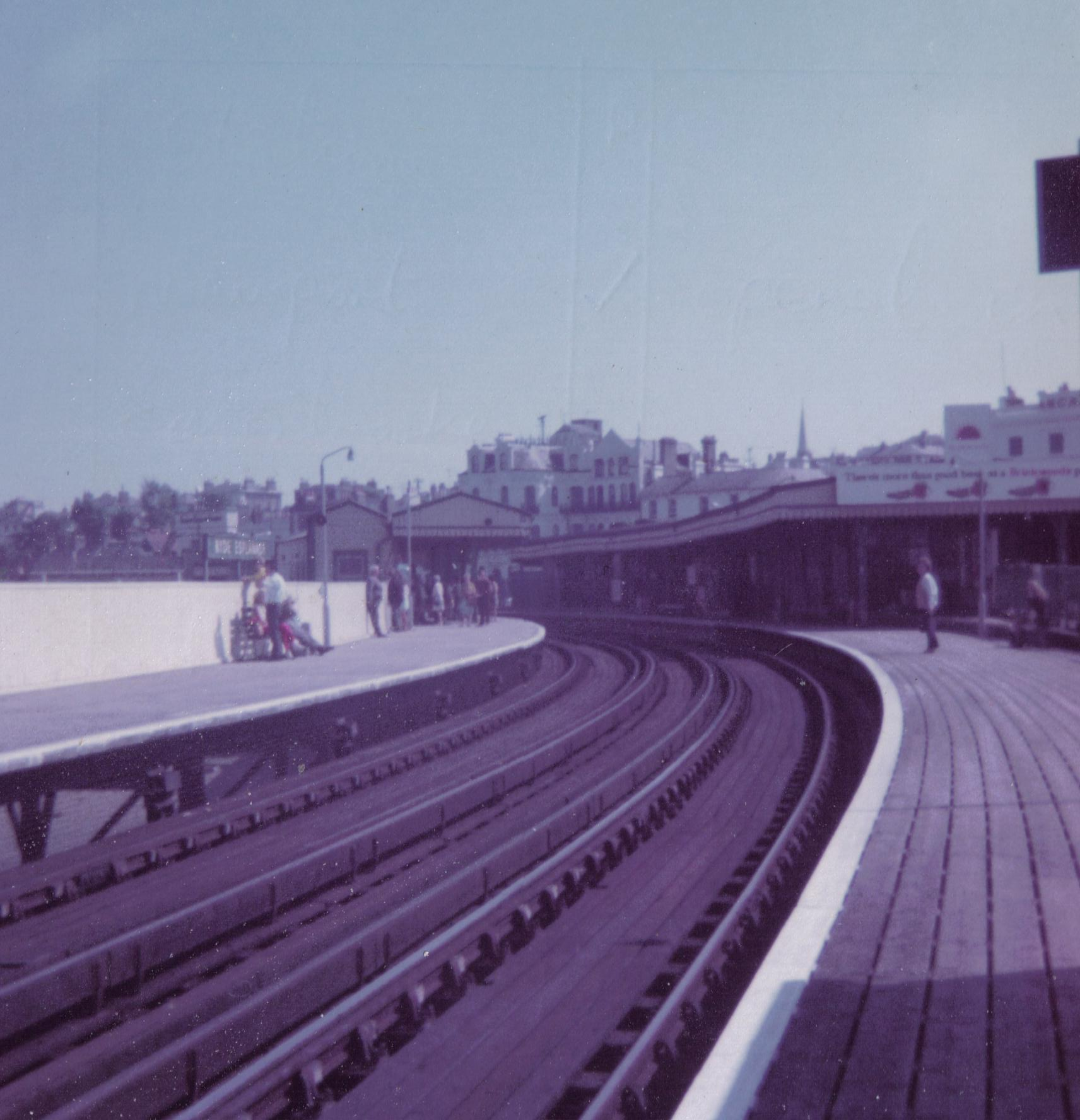
Ryde Esplanade in 1971.

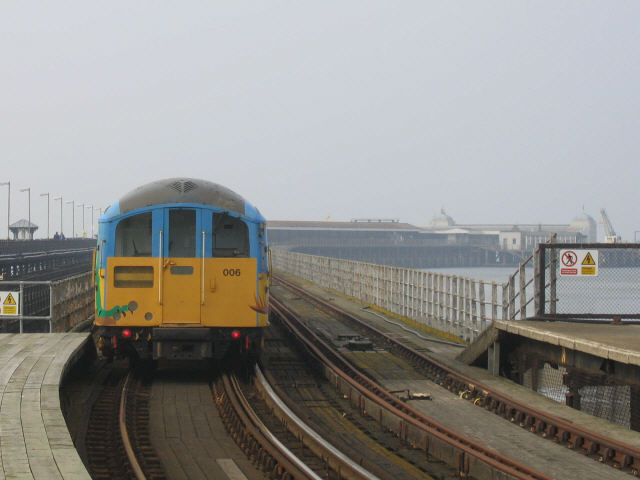
Train leaving Ryde Esplanade, heading towards Ryde Pier Head

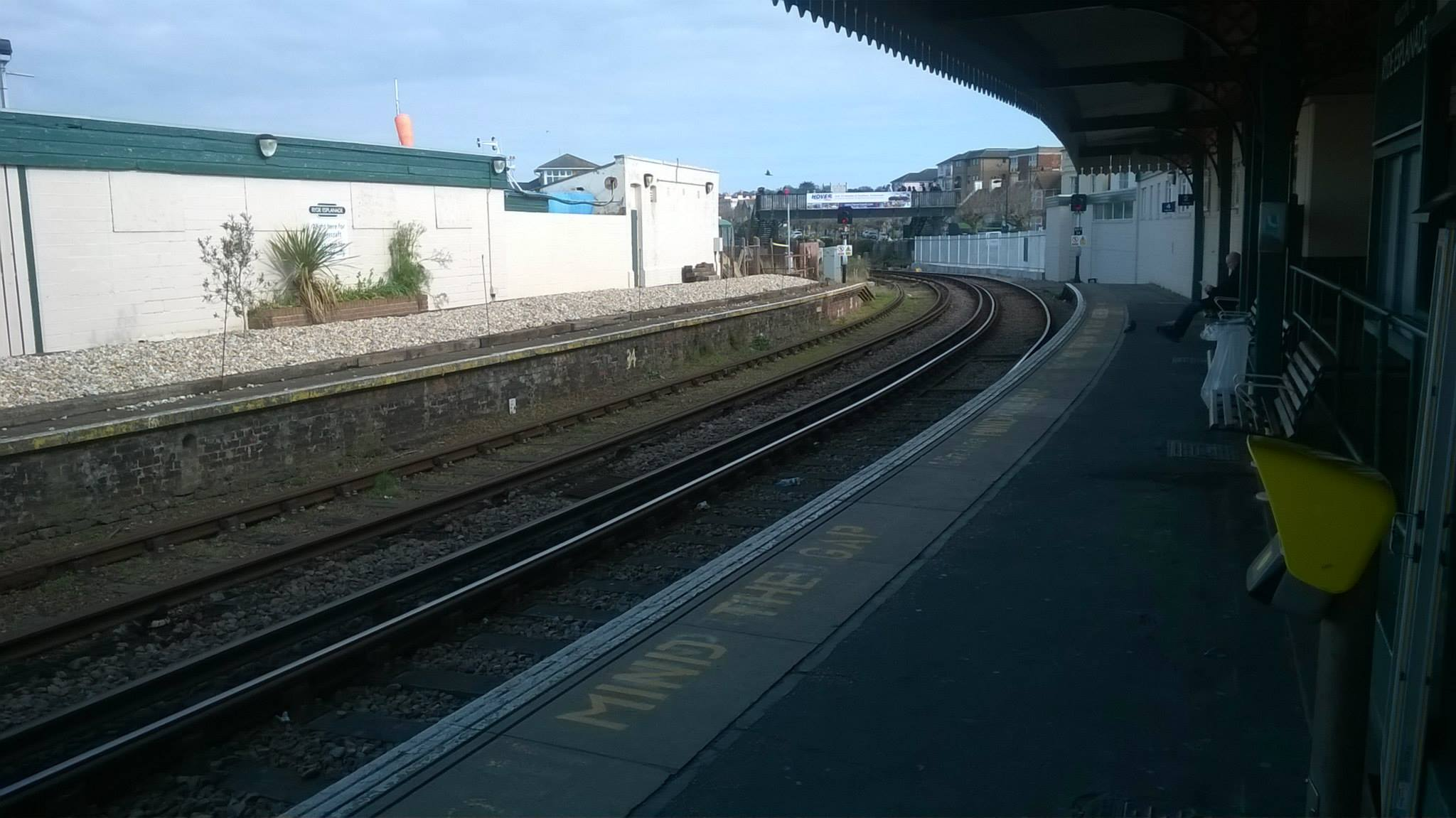
Garden at Platform 2 - April 2015 after the first phase was done.

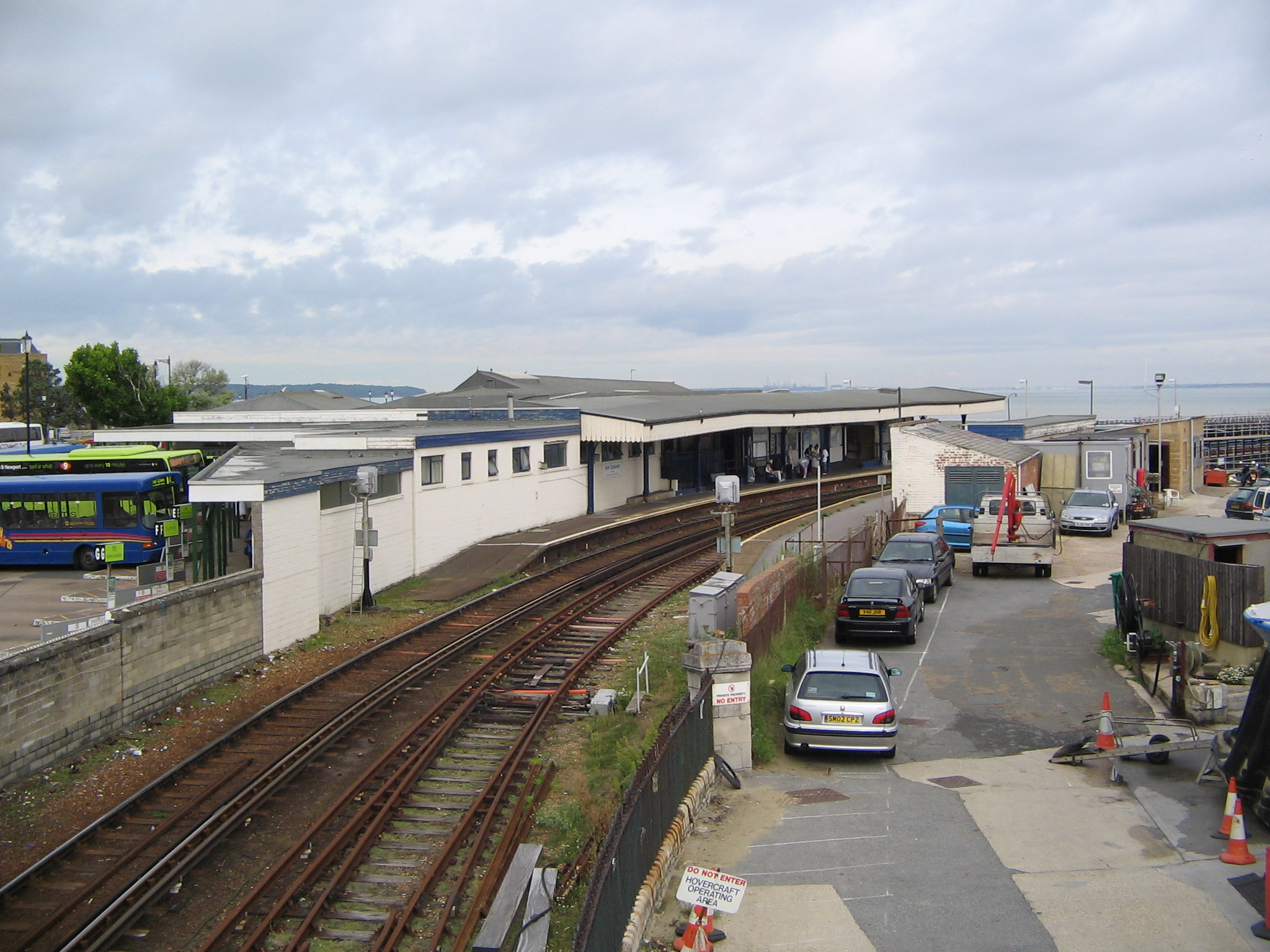
Look from the bridge over the Line which links the Hovercraft to Ryde Interchange.

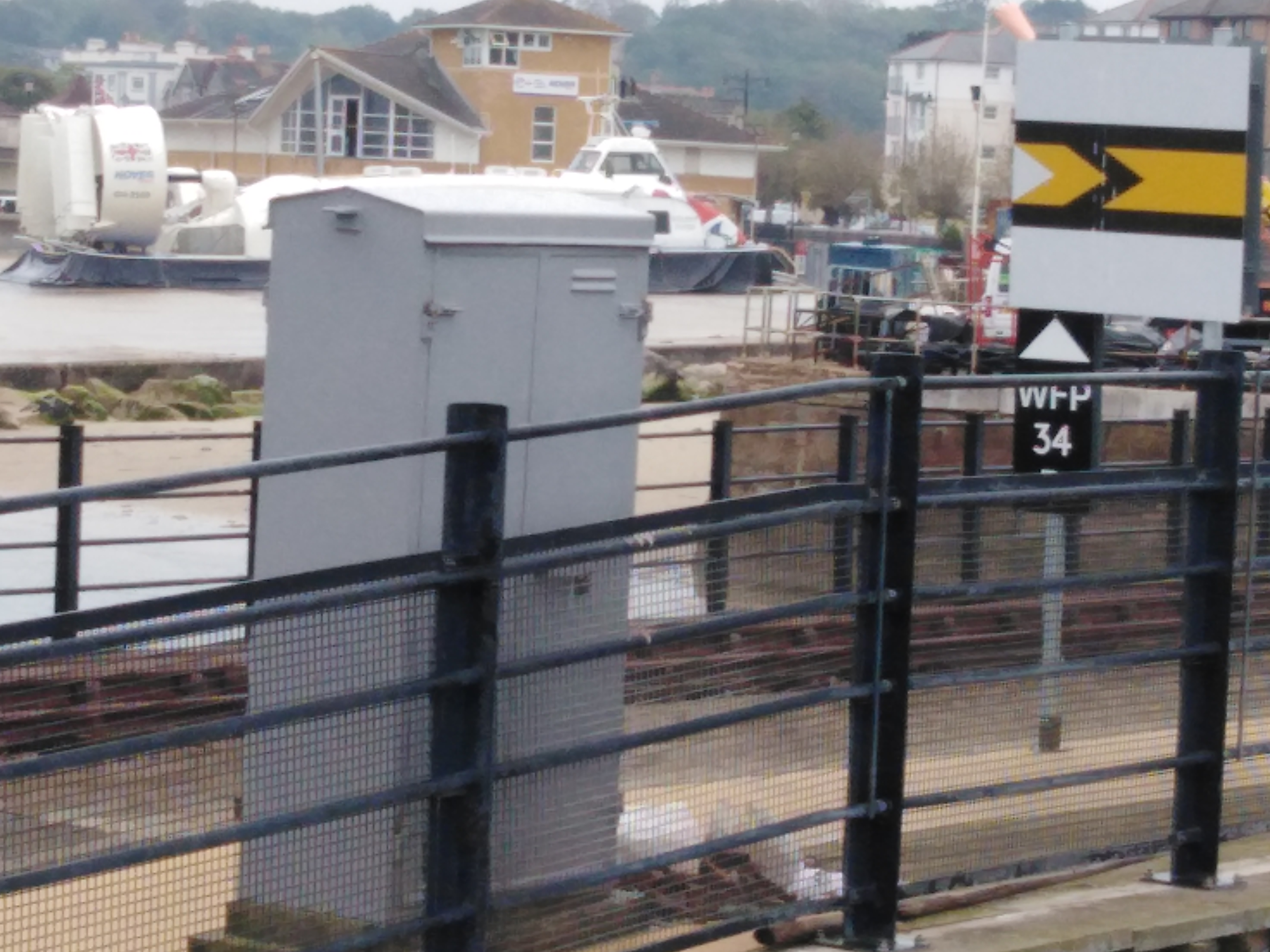
Ryde Esplanade looking south with a Fixed Distance Board in the foreground. The Signal ID is WFP (Whisky Foxtrot Papa) 34 R with a Triangle (Delta) Plate to show that it is not a stop signal.

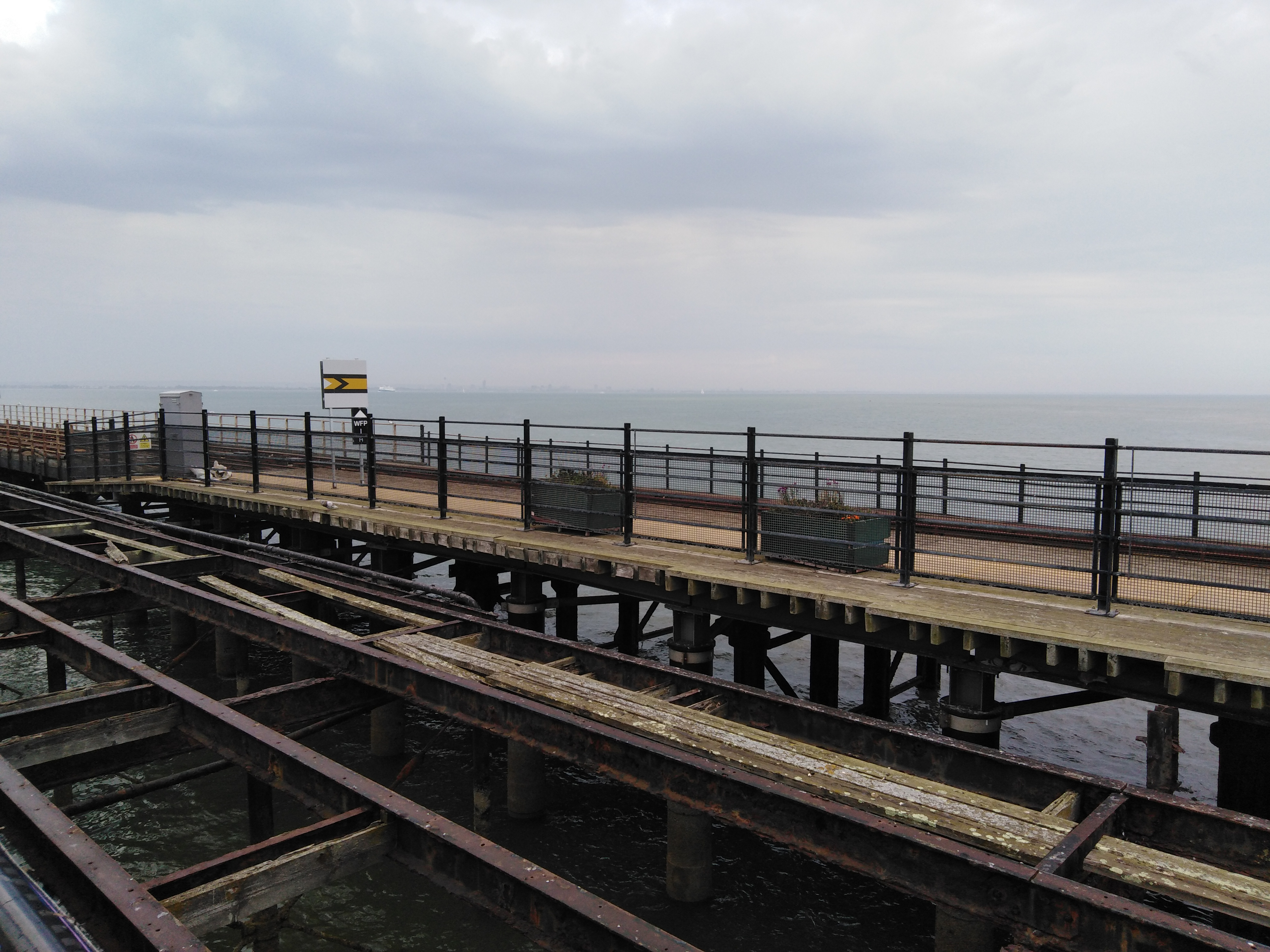
Ryde Esplanade Looking North with a Fixed Distance Board in the foreground. The Signal ID is WFP (Whisky Foxtrot Papa) 1 R with a Triangle (Delta) Plate to show that it is not a stop signal.

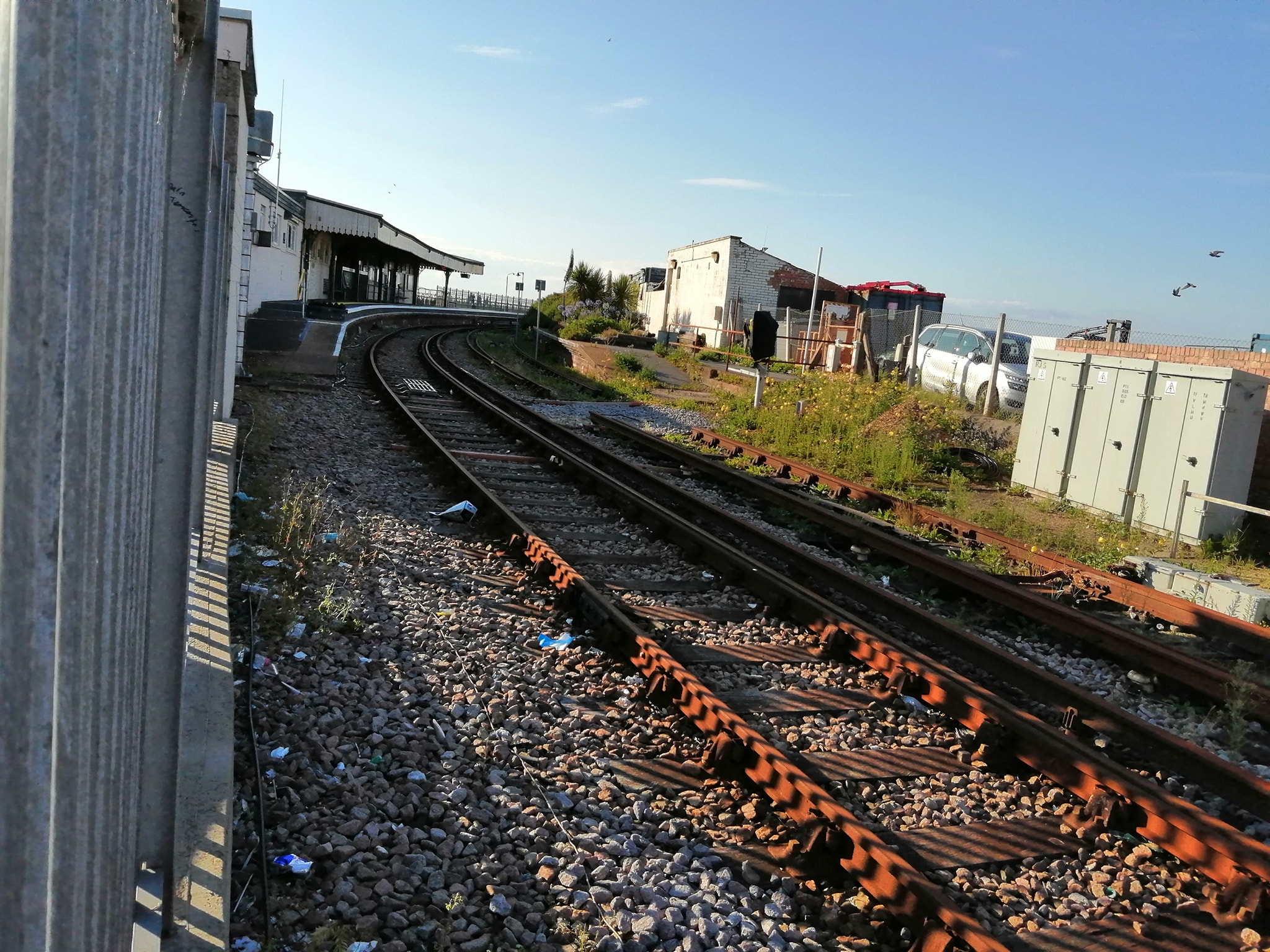
Trains can no longer access Esplanade or Pier Head Platform 2.
