= Ryde Pier Head railway station =

Railway station on the Isle of Wight, England

Coordinates: 50.739°N 1.160°W

Ryde Pier Head
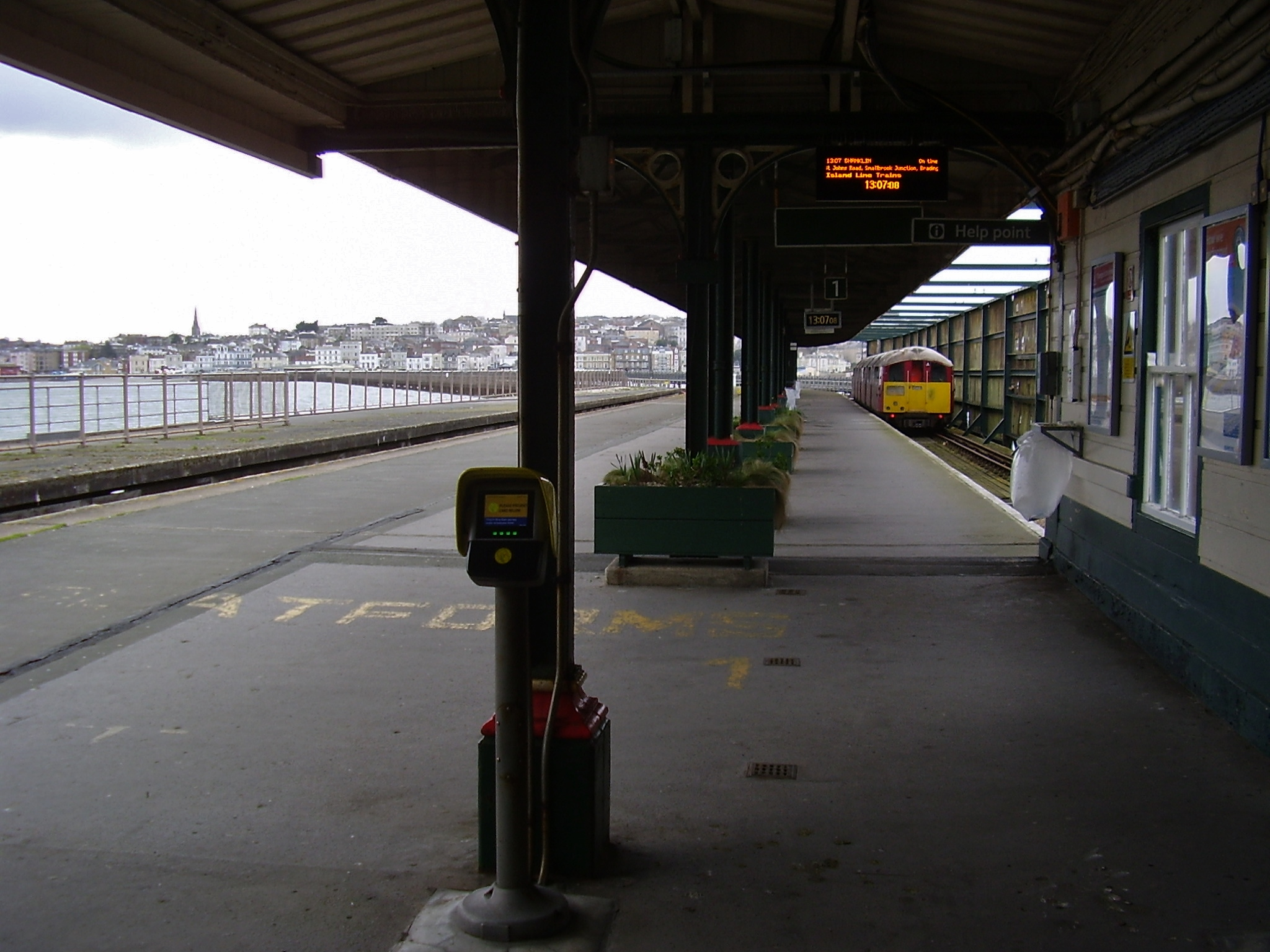

General information
- Location: Ryde, Isle of Wight, England
- Grid reference: SZ593935
- Manager: Island Line
- Platforms: 1

Other information
- Station code: RYP
- Classification: DfT category E

History
- Opened: 12 July 1880
- Original company: Portsmouth and Ryde Joint Railway
- Pre-grouping: Portsmouth and Ryde Joint Railway
- Post-grouping: Southern Railway

Key dates
- 1 January 1967: Closed for electrification
- 20 March 1967: Reopened
- 3 January 2021: Closed for upgrade works
- 1 November 2021: Reopened
- 6 September 2024: Closed for maintenance and repair works
- 2 May 2025: Reopened

Passengers
- 2020/21: ▼26,300
- Interchange: ▼14,228
- 2021/22: ▲68,646
- Interchange: ▲39,789
- 2022/23: ▲92,786
- 2023/24: ▲0.103 million
- Interchange: ▼37,501
- 2024/25: ▲0.129 million
- Interchange: ▼13,968
Location
Notes
- Passenger statistics from the Office of Rail and Road

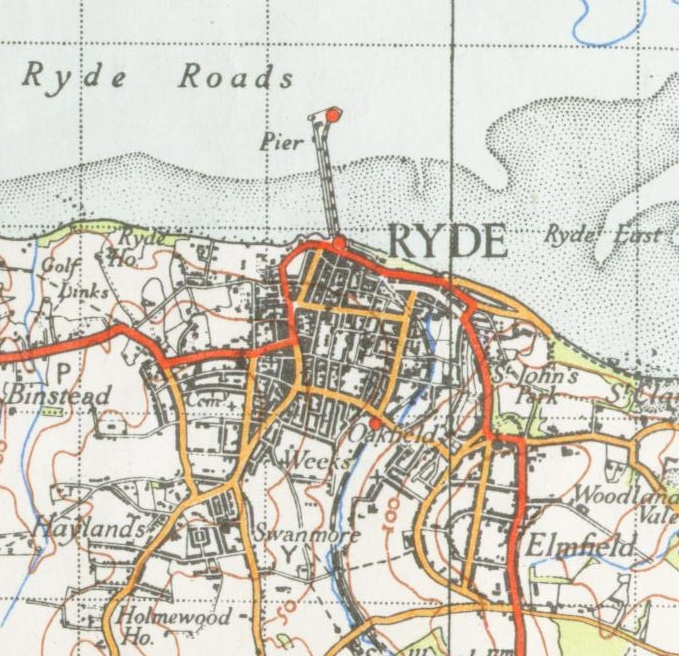
A 1945 Ordnance Survey of Ryde showing the location of the Ryde Pier Head, Ryde Esplanade and Ryde St John's Road stations

Ryde Pier Head railway station is one of three stations in the town of Ryde on the Isle of Wight. Situated at the end of the town's pier, it is adjacent to the terminal for the Wightlink fast catamaran service connecting the island with Portsmouth on the English mainland. Passengers can use this to connect with the rest of the National Rail network at Portsmouth Harbour station, which is adjacent to the Portsmouth terminal. Through rail tickets for travel via Pier Head station are available to and from other stations on the Isle of Wight. These include travel on the catamaran service to or from Portsmouth as appropriate.

Trains run down the eastern coast of the Isle of Wight to Shanklin (the Island Line), the last remnant of a network of railways on the island. Because of the restricted loading gauge, particularly through the tunnel under Ryde, services are operated by former London Underground stock.

The ticket office at the station is run by Wightlink and not Island Line.

== History ==
In 1880 the London and South Western Railway (LSWR) and London, Brighton and South Coast Railway (LBSCR) agreed to open a jointly owned line north from Ryde St John's Road. Under the direction of LBSCR Chief Engineer Frederick Banister, the construction of the extension included a new tunnel and a third Ryde Pier to enable the line to reach a new station at Ryde Pier Head, which provided a connection with the companies' ferry services.

When the LBSC/LSWR joint line opened, it was as a double track section from Ryde St John's Road station through to Ryde Pier Head. There was a scissors crossover situated on Ryde Pier to allow trains to access all platforms. Sets of crossovers were installed at St John's Road to enable trains to change from the joint line's left-hand running to the single-track sections on the Isle of Wight Central Railway's Newport line and the Isle of Wight Railway's Shanklin line (now known as the Island Line).

The station originally consisted of three platforms in the form of a pair of islands; a fourth track was added later, opening in 1933. The station was rebuilt on electrification of the remaining line in 1967, and the new layout consisted of two tracks with three platform faces. One of these tracks is now out of use, so only one platform currently operates. This is the track which runs along the western side of the pier; a double track section commences immediately to the south of Ryde Esplanade railway station.

As of May 2019, the condition of some of the station buildings led to criticism that it was not a sufficiently welcoming sight for visitors to the island. There were also significant concerns that the age and condition of the Victorian railway pier would mean the line between the Esplanade and Pier Head might have to be abandoned, as it was not seen as economical to renew the pier based on passenger numbers. However, noting that if the pier railway were to close the rest of the Island Line would serve little purpose and therefore also likely close, Network Rail have agreed to fund £5m worth of renewal work on the pier, as the government makes a £26m investment in new trains and track for the route. From 2021 onwards, the Pier Head (and the rest of the Island Line) is served by new Vivarail D-Train Class 484 EMUs, converted from London Underground D78 Stock.

=== Stationmasters ===
- John Henry Astridge 1880 - 1884 (also station master of Ryde Esplanade)
- James Langworthy 1884 - 1894 (also station master of Ryde Esplanade)
- William Percy Froud 1895 - 1905 (afterwards station master at Portsmouth Town and Portsmouth Harbour)
- T.J.D. Russell 1905 - 1906
- George Henry French 1906 - 1930 (also station master at Ryde Esplanade)
- Malcolm J. Bucket 1930 - 1931 (formerly station master at Fratton, also station master at Ryde Esplanade and Ryde St John's)
- H.E. Millichap ca. 1935 - 1941 (also station master at Ryde Esplanade and Ryde St John's)
- T.F. Thompson 1941 - 1949
- T. Rowley Cliff ca. 1951

== Services ==
As of May 2026, trains run to Shanklin every approximately 40 minutes between 06:03 and 23:17, though on Monday to Friday, there are two two-hour gaps in service. A late evening train additionally calls at stations to St John's Road. Weekend services are hourly all day.

Wightlink passenger ferry services run every hour to Portsmouth Harbour for most of the day, though services progressively depart later in the evening, with the last sailing from Ryde Pier Head at 23:10 daily.

Preceding station	Island Line	Following station
Terminus	Island Line	Ryde Esplanade towards Shanklin
Ferry services
Terminus	Wightlink	Portsmouth Harbour Terminus

== Gallery ==
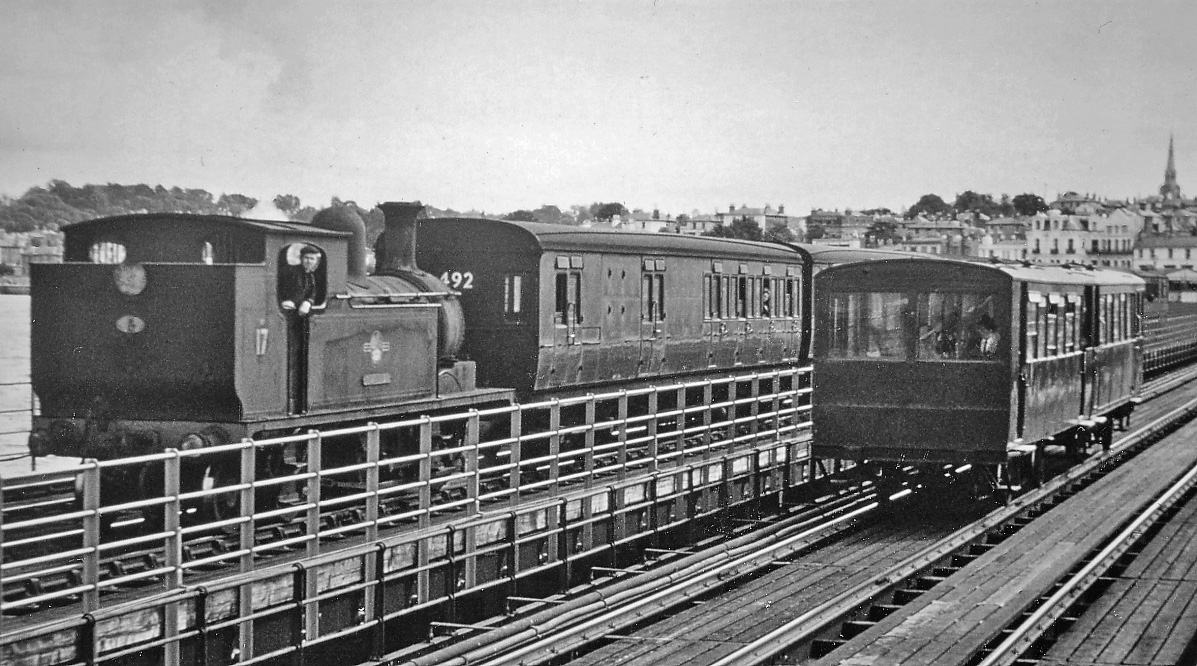
Steam train and petrol tramcar in 1965

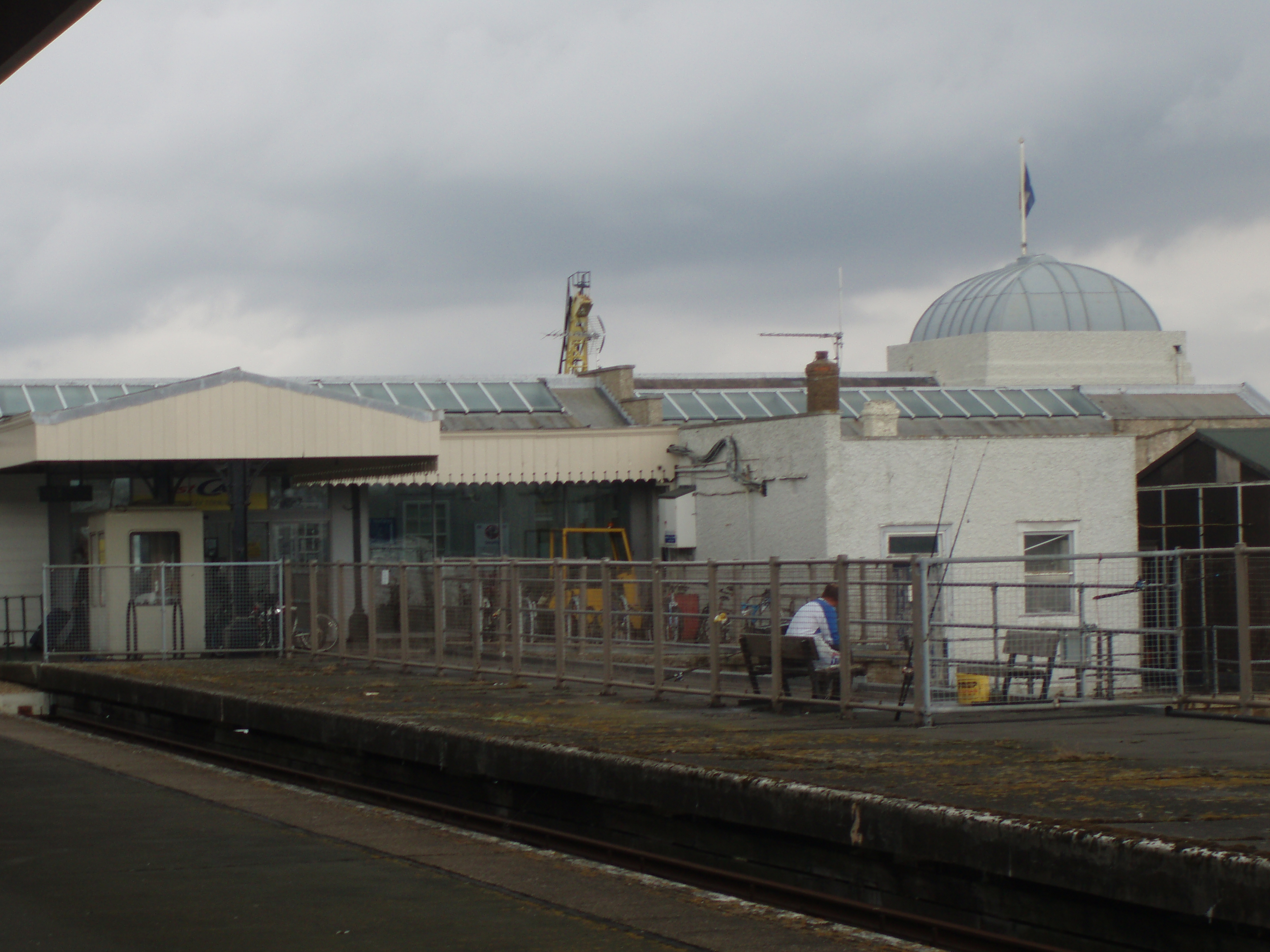
Familiar Dome

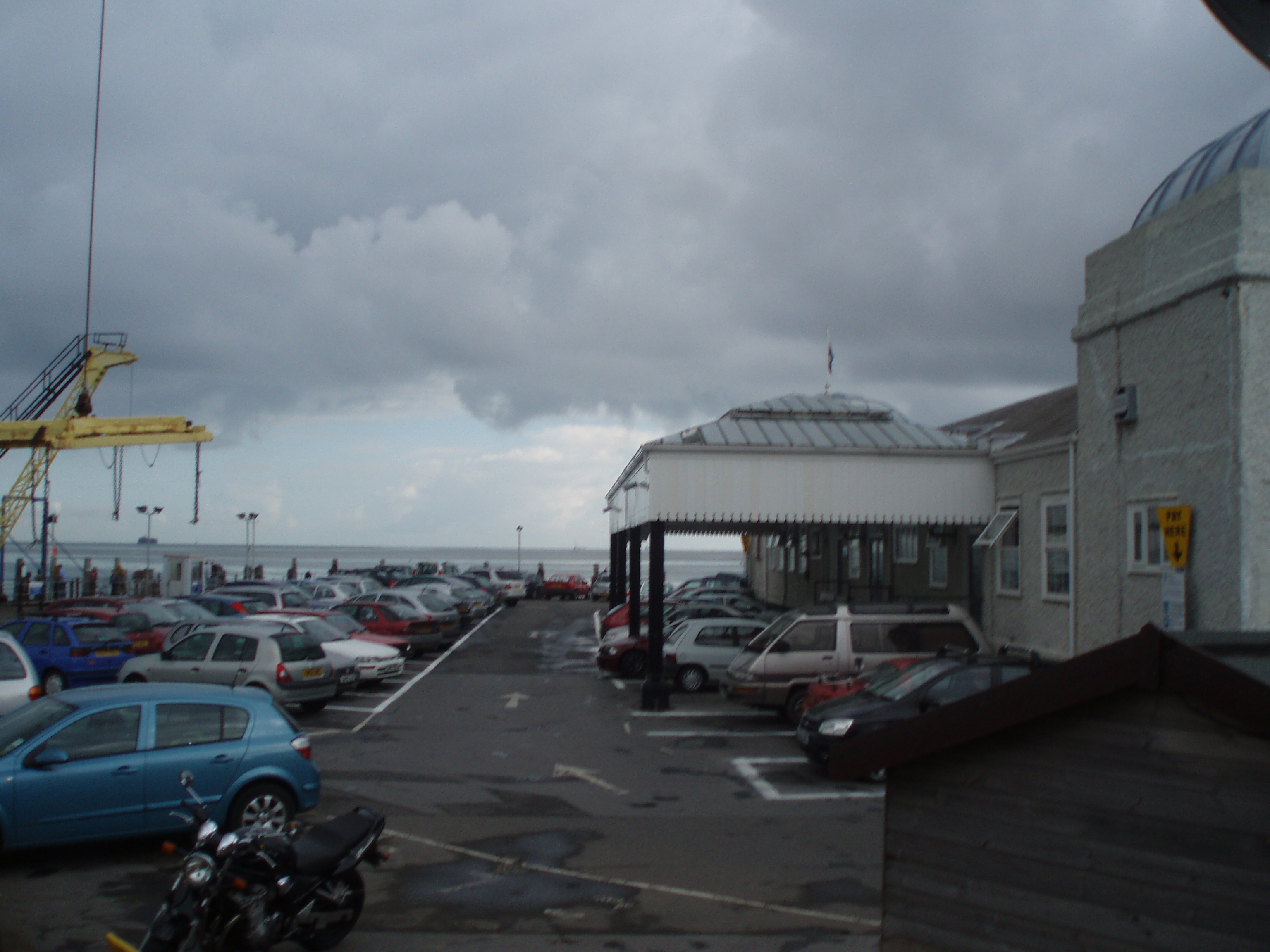
Car park behind

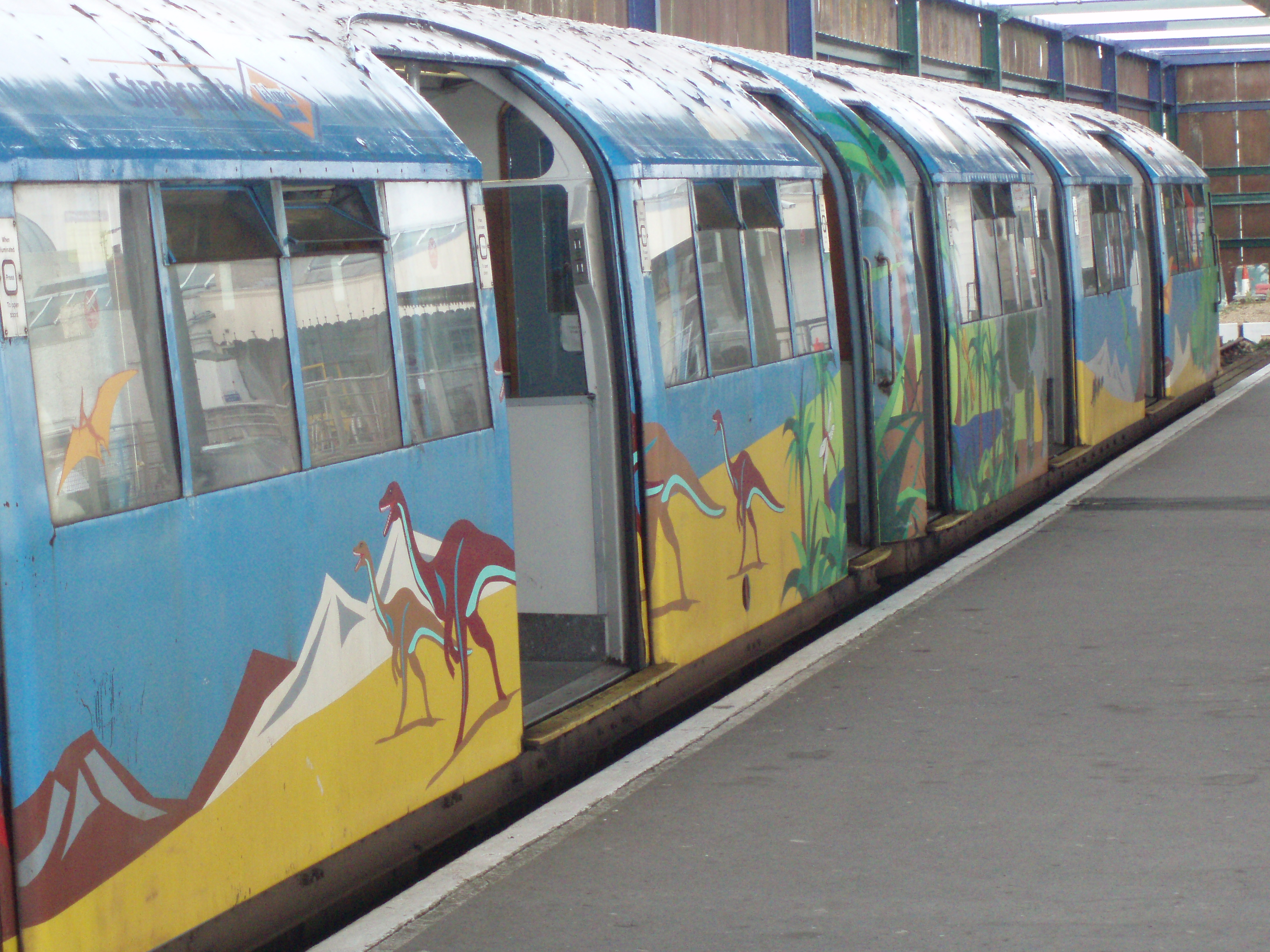
Dinosaur train at Ryde Pier Head

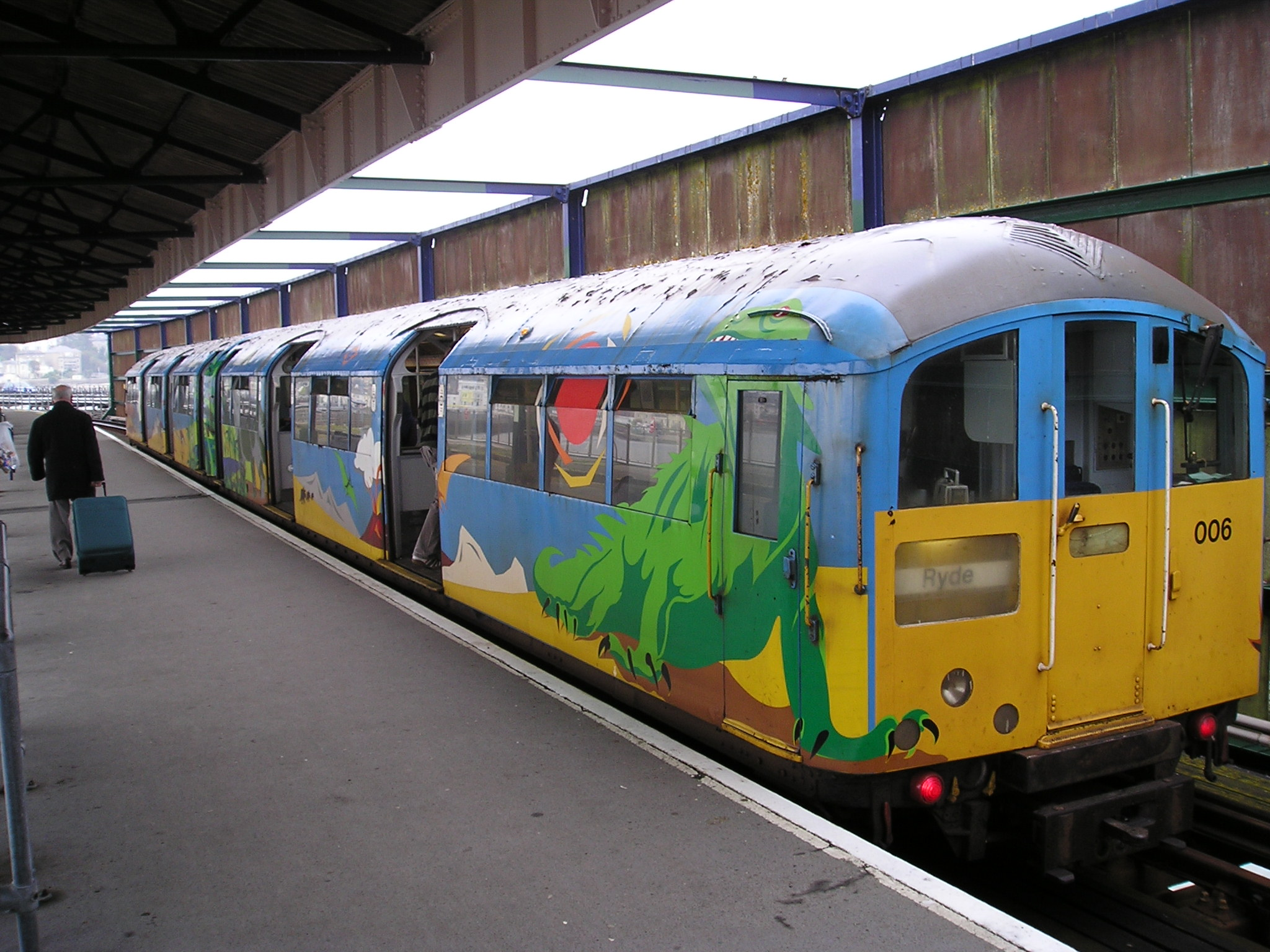
Dinosaur train at Ryde Pier Head

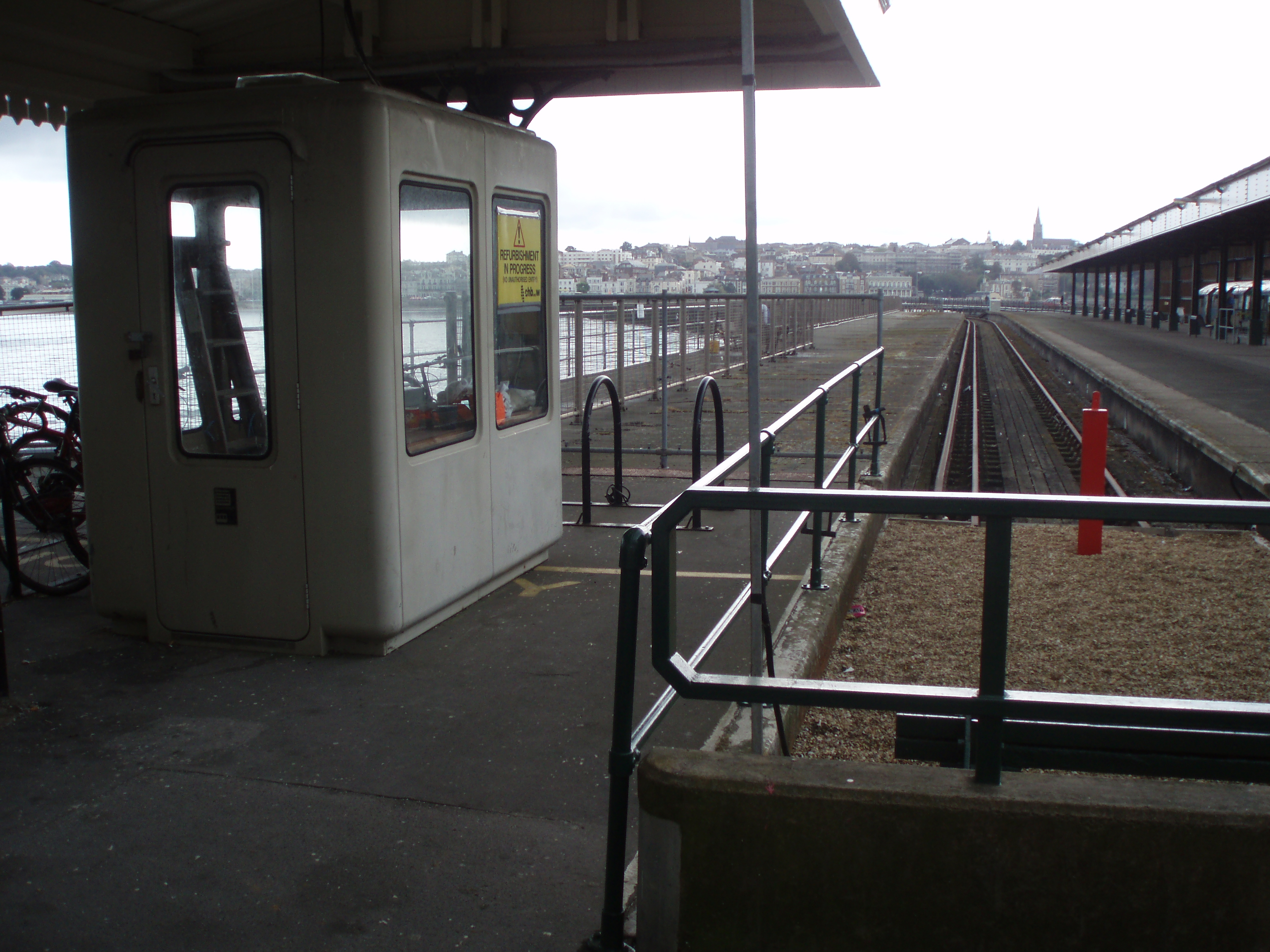
Looking towards Esplanade station

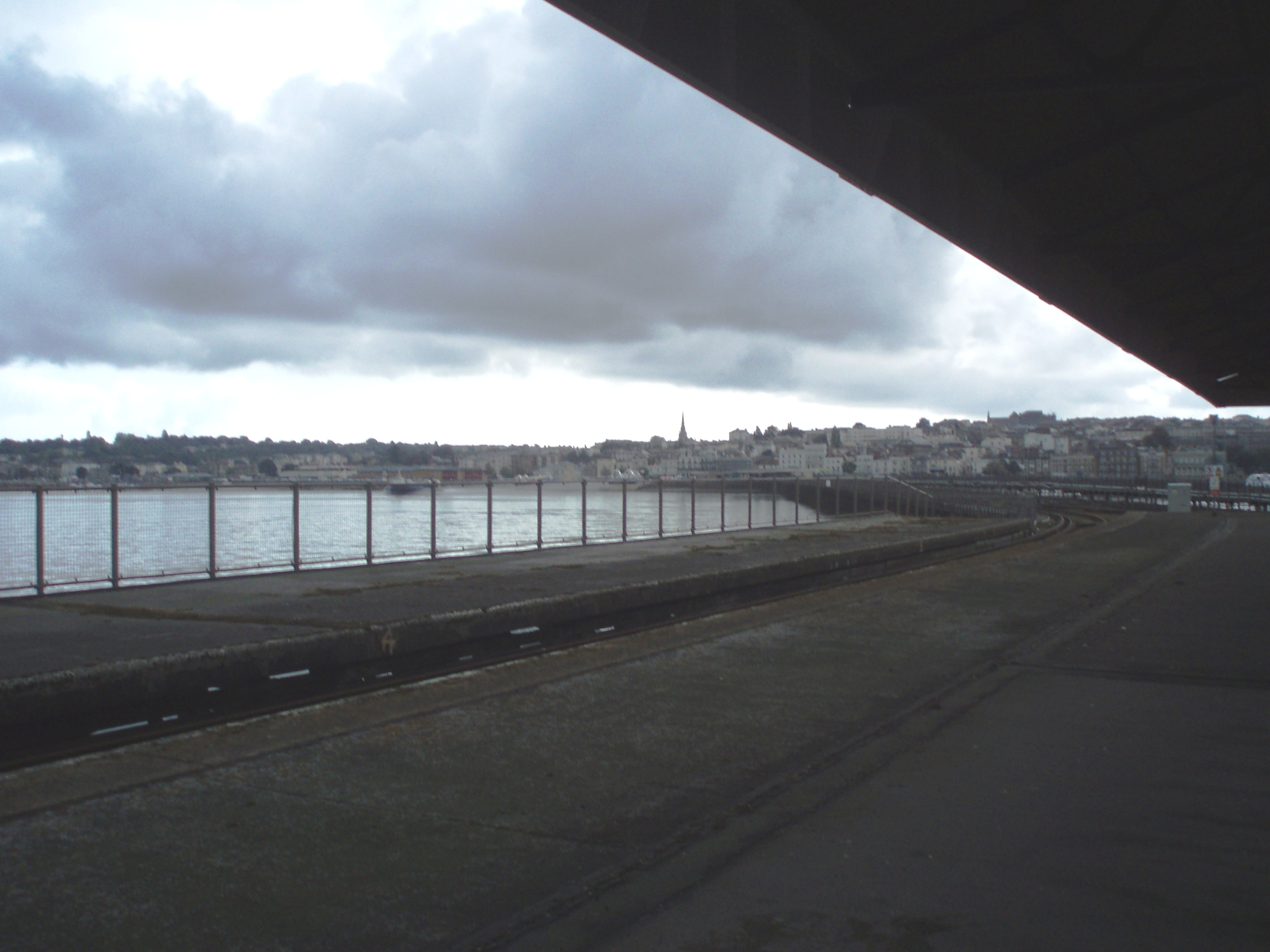
Eastern view

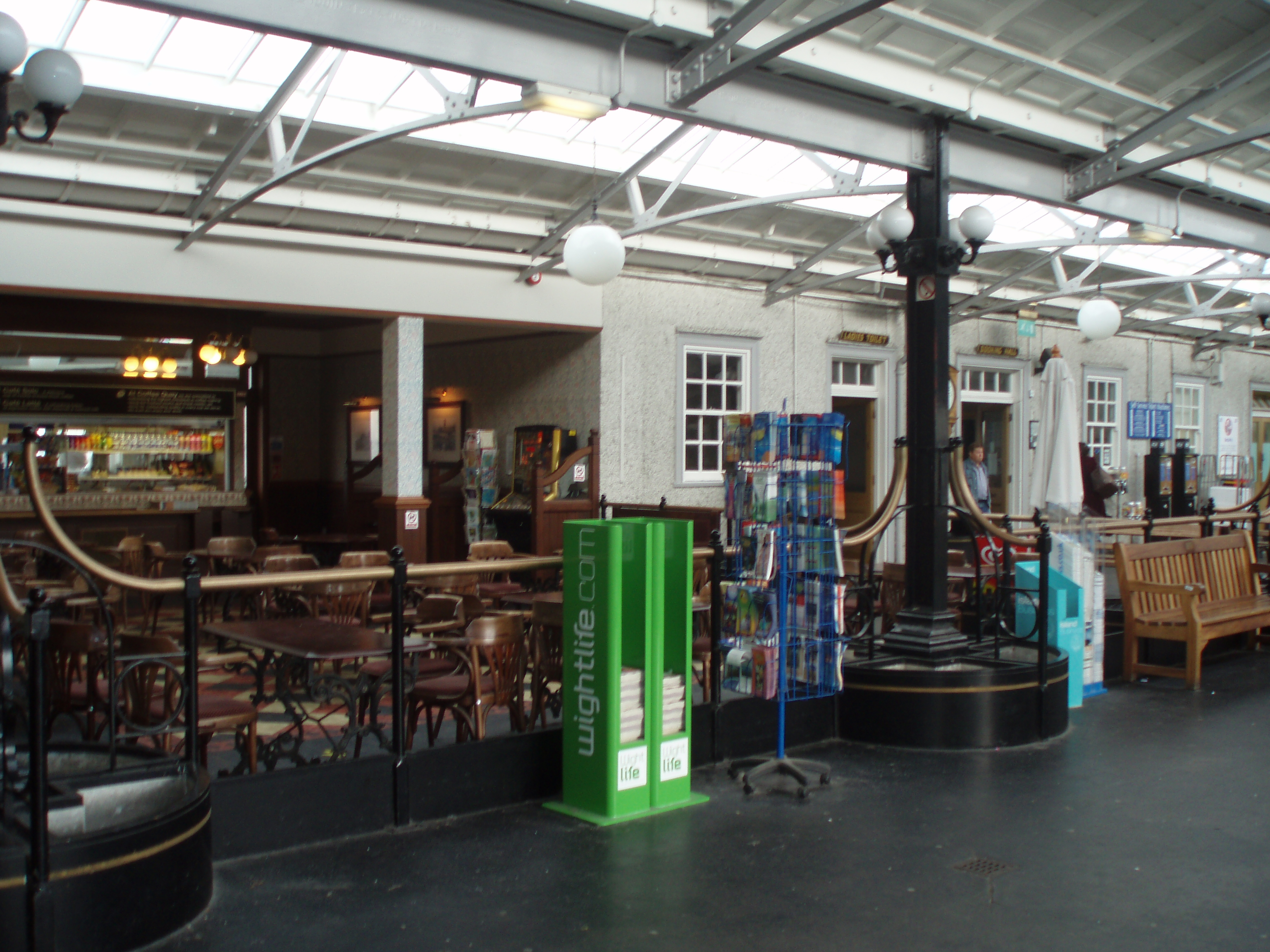
Foyer

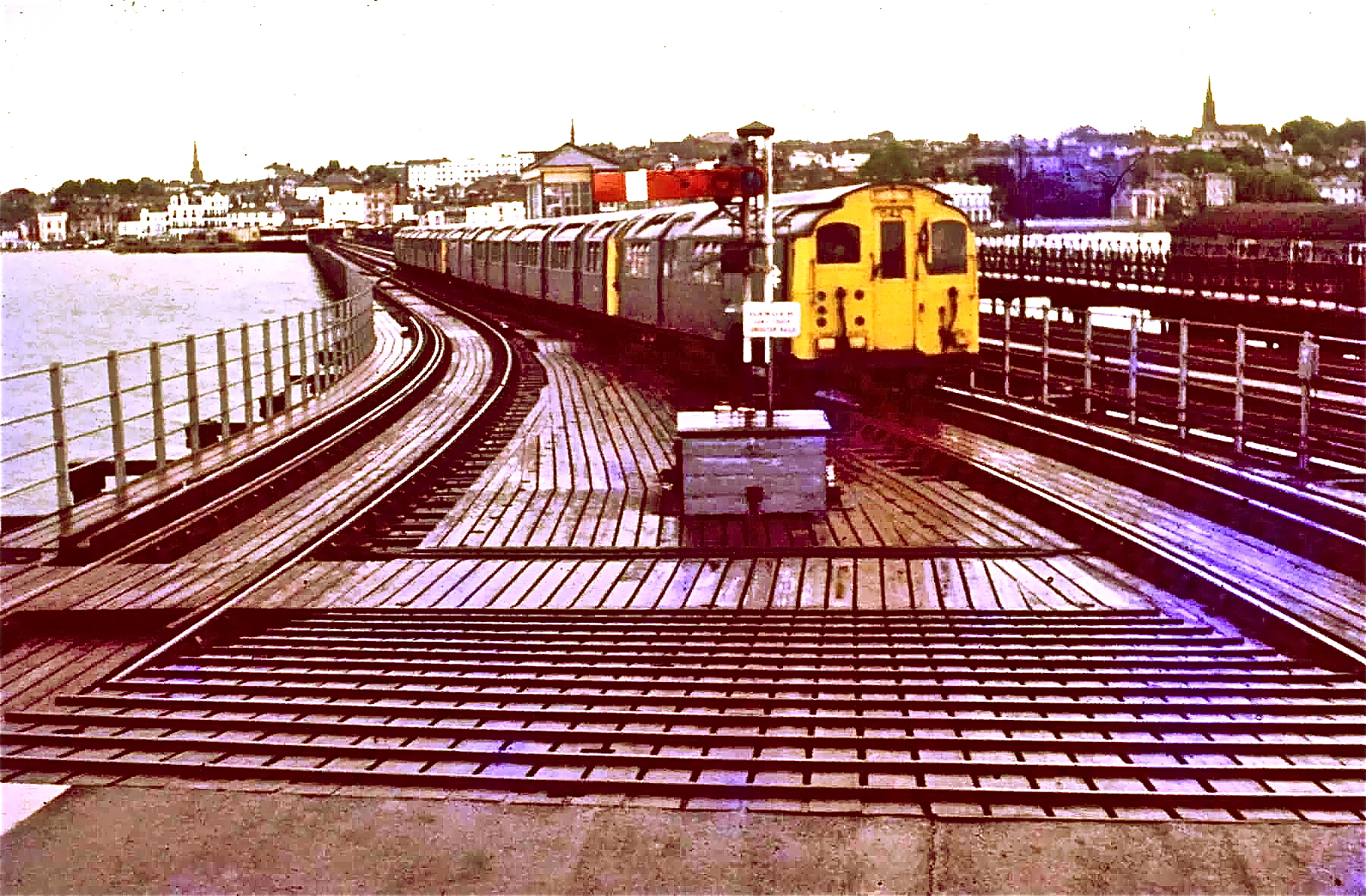
Class 485 Unit 042 in 1969

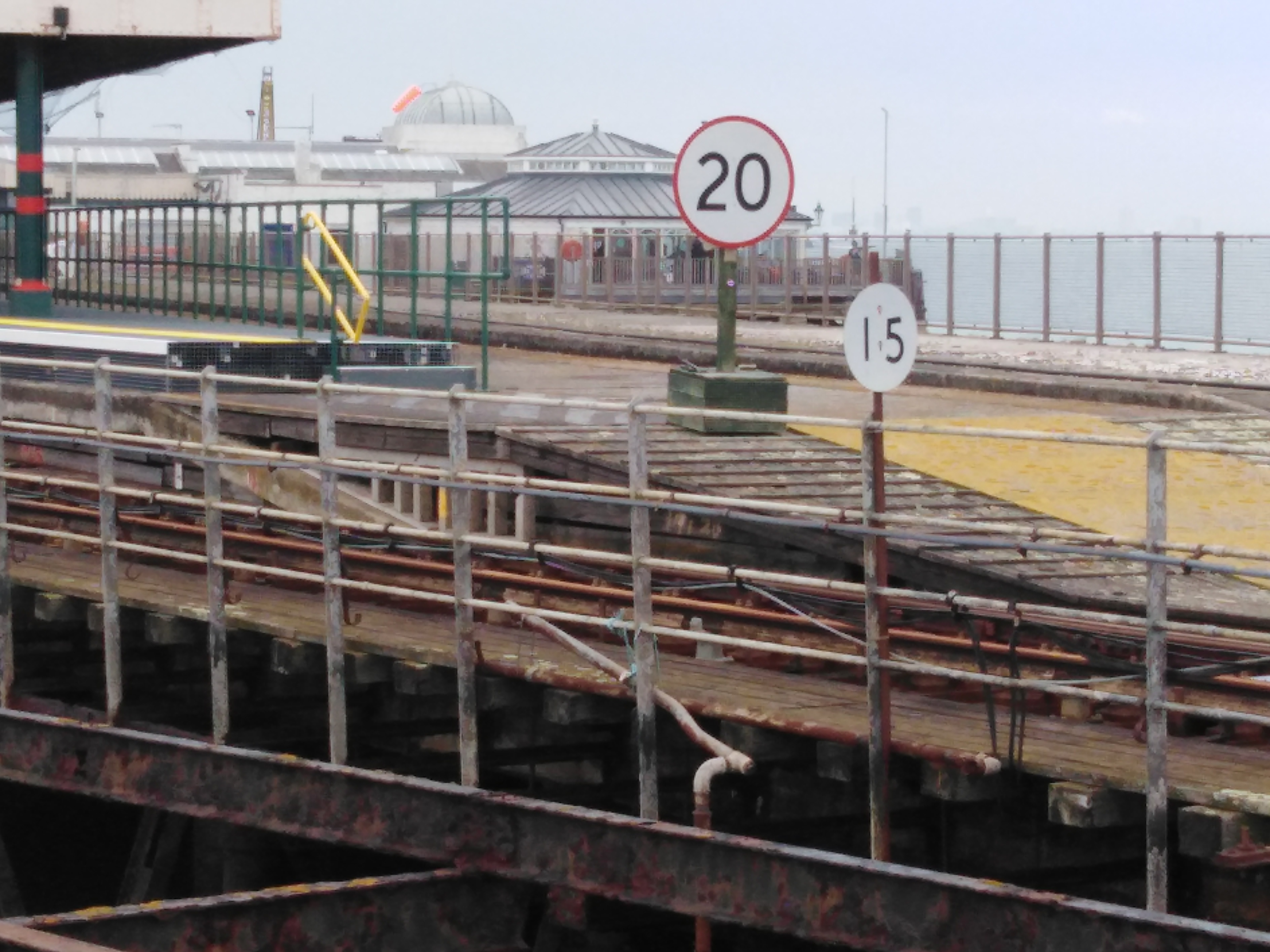
Ryde Pier Head in June 2021 the raised part is for the new trains. The station will have level boarding.
