= Transport on the Isle of Wight =

Various transport methods used on the Isle of Wight, England

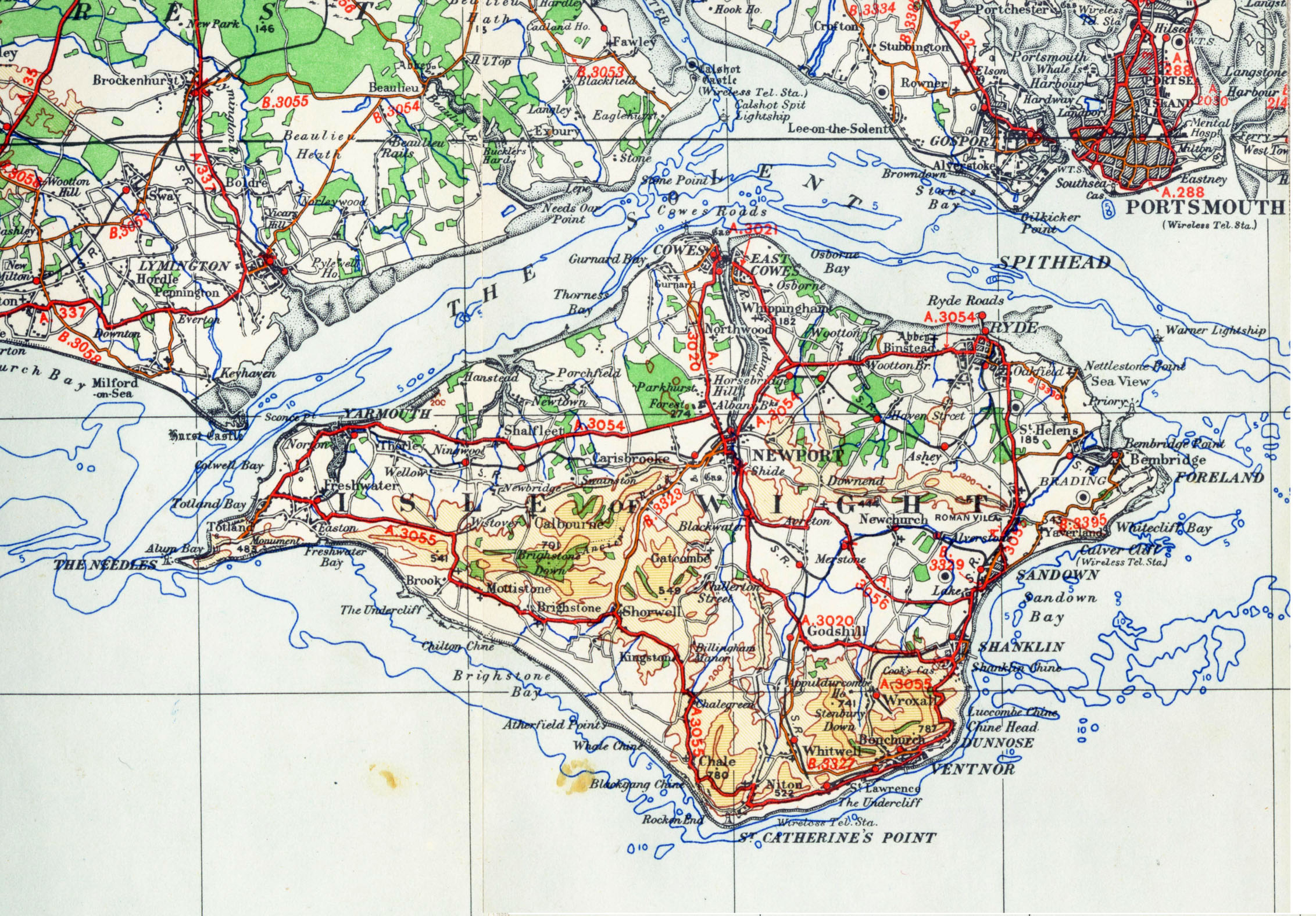
A map of the island from 1945

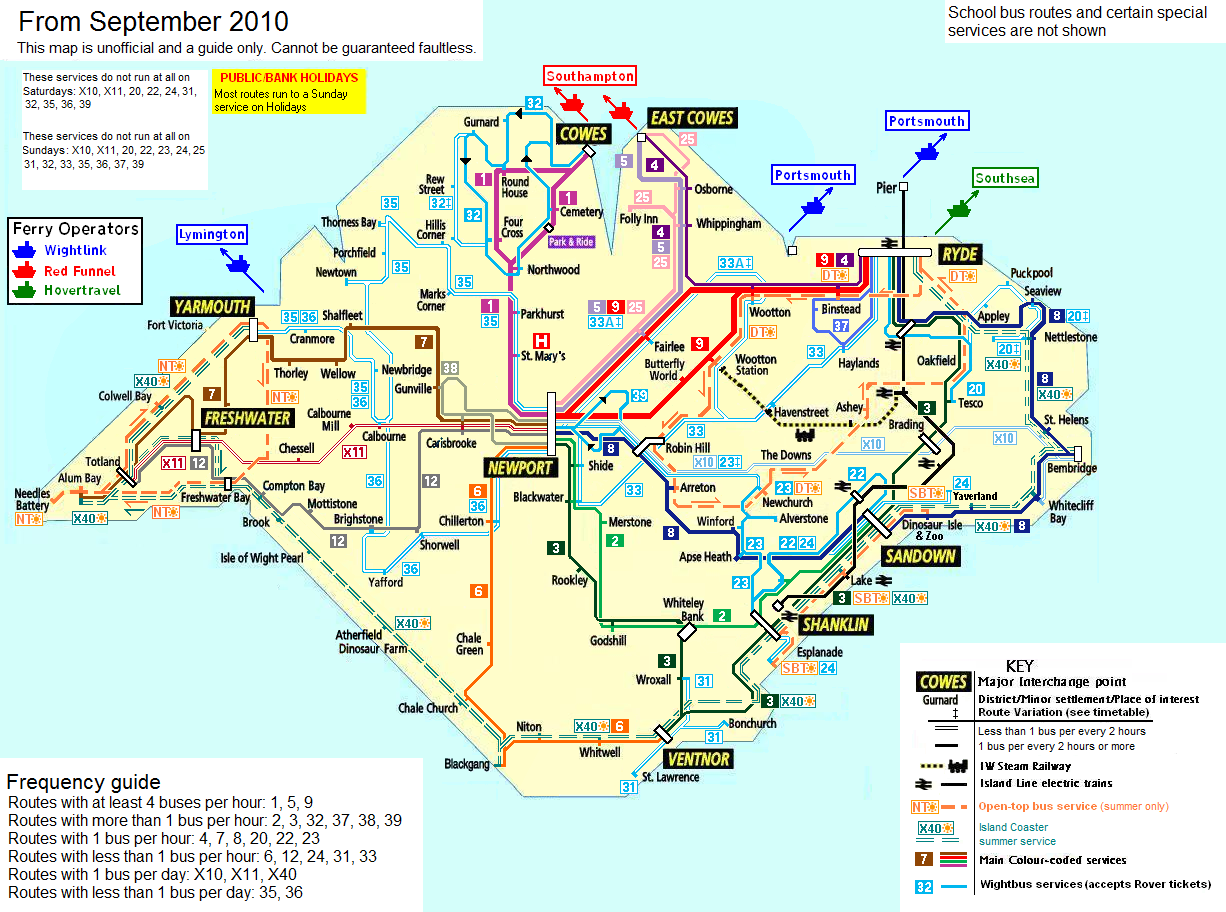
Public transport map from September 2010

There are several modes of transport on the Isle of Wight, an island in the English Channel.

== Rail ==
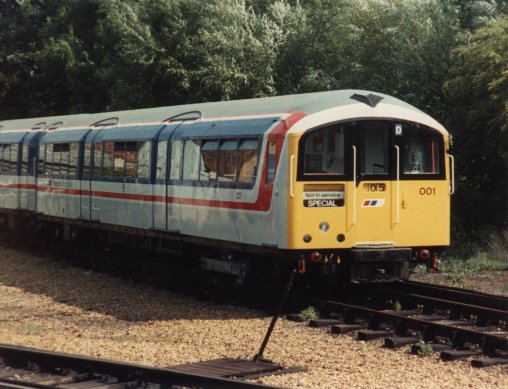
An Island Line train, unit 483001, in 1989.

The Island Line is the one railway left on the island. It runs some 8½ miles from Ryde Pier Head to Shanklin, down the eastern side of the island via Brading and Sandown. It was opened by the Isle of Wight Railway in 1864, and was nationalised in 1948, falling under the Southern Region of British Railways. It was transferred to Network SouthEast in 1982, as part of the sectorisation of British Rail, who operated it under the Ryde Rail brand. After the privatisation of British Rail, it was run by Island Line Trains between 1996 and 2007, the smallest train operating company on the National Rail network. Services are now provided by South Western Railway, using electric trains which are converted London Underground rolling stock. These trains date from 1978, making them some of the oldest trains in regular passenger service anywhere in the UK.

The island also has a steam-operated heritage railway, the Isle of Wight Steam Railway. This connects with the Island Line at Smallbrook Junction, and was part of the former Ryde to Newport line.

In the 1950s and 1960s, and before the Beeching Report, the island enjoyed a comprehensive network based on a triangle of lines connecting Ryde, Newport, Sandown and Ventnor. Lines ran from Ryde to Cowes via Newport and from Ryde to Ventnor via Brading, Sandown and Shanklin. Branch lines led from Brading to Bembridge, Sandown to Newport and west from Newport to Yarmouth and Freshwater. There were two stations at Ventnor:

1. Ventnor, the terminus of the aforementioned Island Line from Ryde via Brading, Sandown and Shanklin.
2. Ventnor Town (renamed Ventnor West by the Southern Railway in 1923) – a branch of the Newport-Sandown line from Merstone, via Godshill.

The two lines terminated at different levels above the town.

Today, much of the old rail network has been converted to cycle ways, including the Newport-Cowes, Newport-Sandown and Yarmouth-Freshwater sections. Other sections can still be traced on the ground, including the two tunnels where the Ventnor lines ran beneath the downs.

== Roads ==
The Island has 550 miles (890 km) of roadway, and does not have any motorway, although it does have a short stretch of dual carriageway with a 70 mph speed limit north of Newport.

A sign used to greet visitors disembarking from the car ferry at Fishbourne stating Island Roads are Different, Please Drive Carefully.

== Buses ==
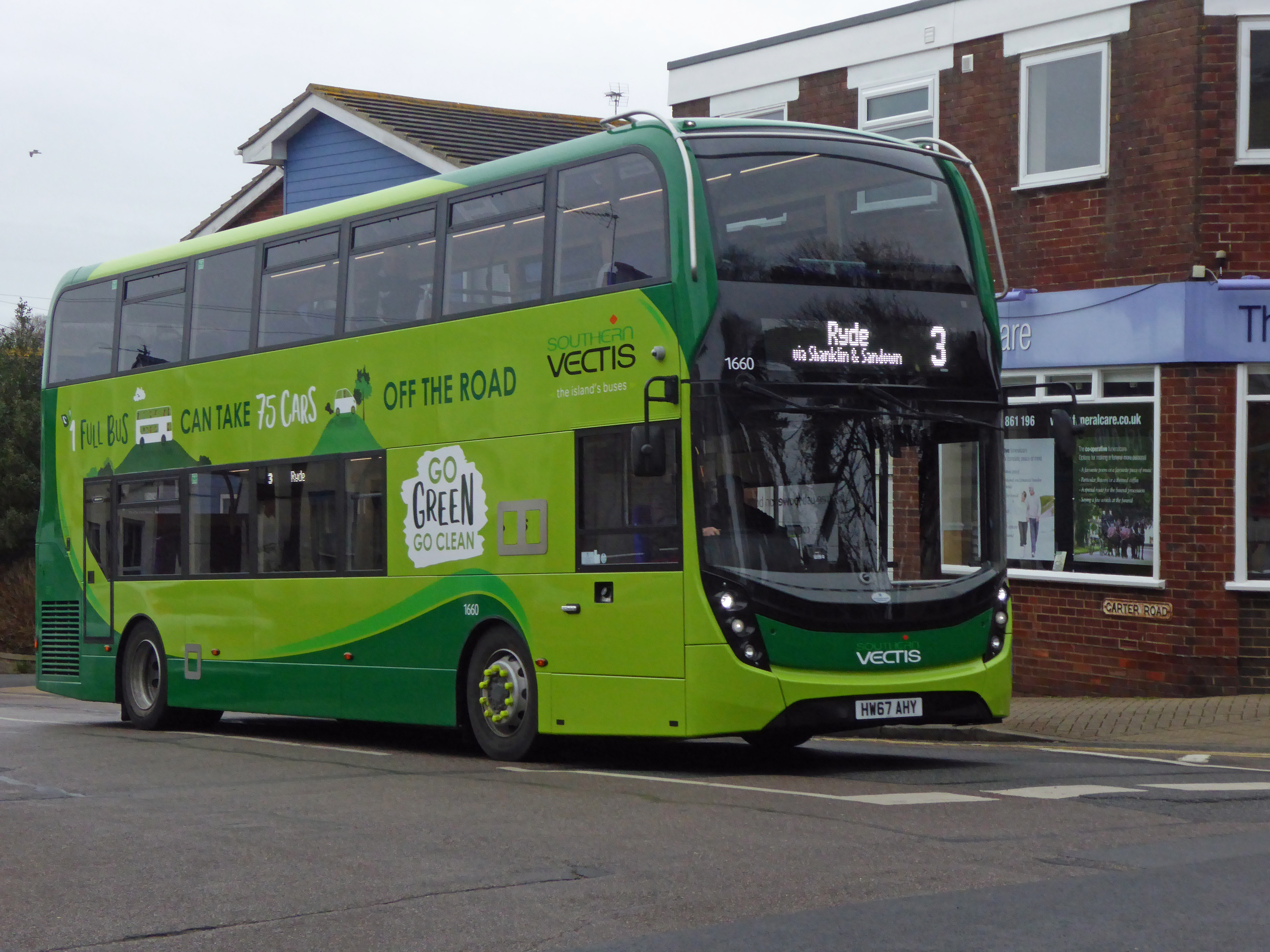
Southern Vectis ADL MMC 1660 in Shanklin

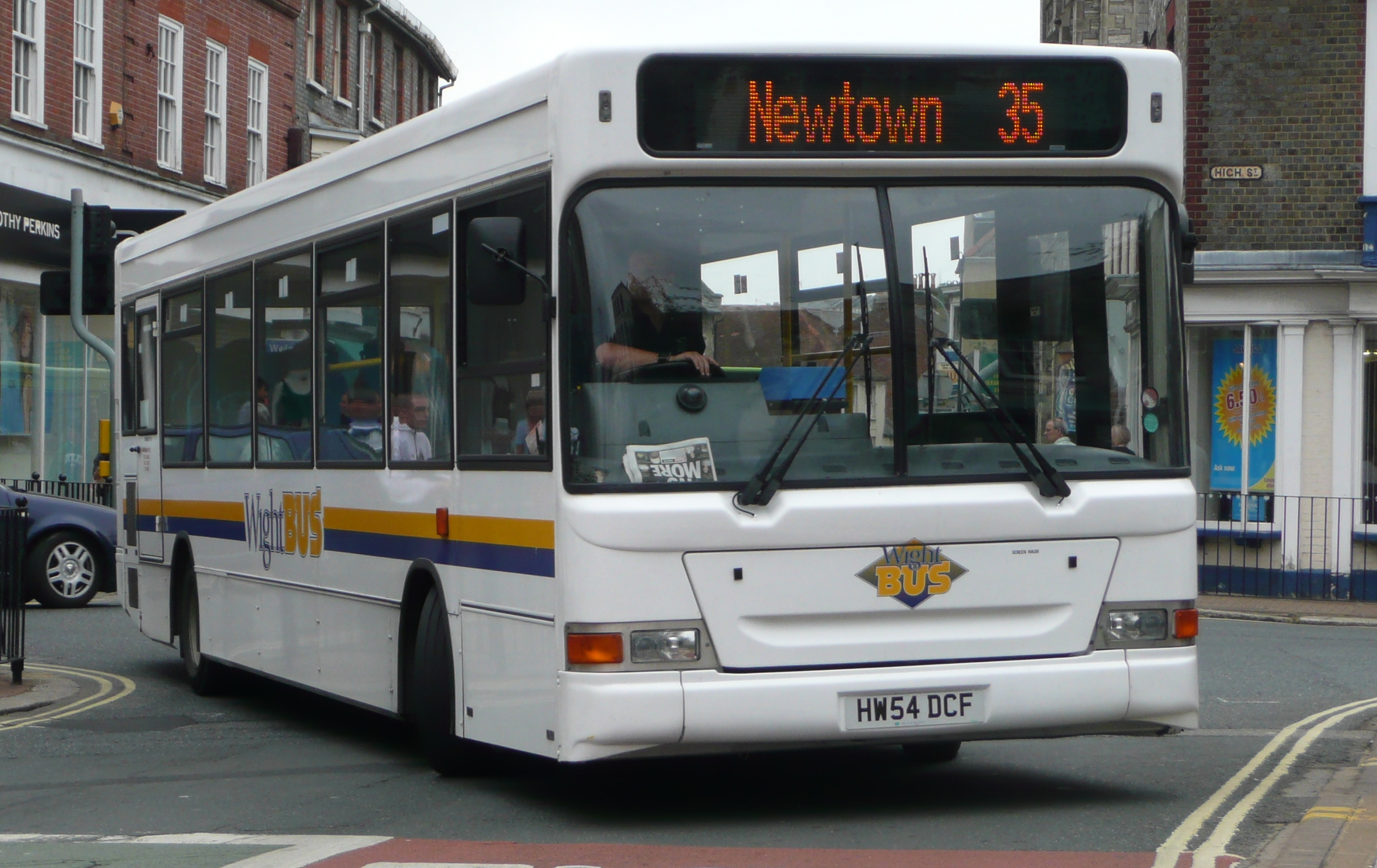
A Wightbus vehicle in Newport.

April 1905 saw the start of bus services, with the Isle of Wight Express Syndicate operating a circular service running between Newport, Shanklin, Sandown and Ryde. The Vectis bus company was formed in 1922. At first, it used only double decker buses; however, a review found that island roads were not always suitable and so single deckers were used instead (double deckers were re-introduced in 1936). In 1929, the Vectis Bus Company was bought by Southern Railway, forming Southern Vectis. After 1968, it became part of the state-owned National Bus Company. In 1986, with privatisation, the bus company was bought by its management team and it stayed independent until 2005, when it was bought by the Go-Ahead Group.

Southern Vectis had a near-monopoly of island bus transport for most of the 20th and early 21st century, challenged only briefly after deregulation in 1986. It now runs fifteen different routes, with the most regular services between the larger towns such as Ryde and Cowes. From April 2006, the company changed the livery on its buses (excluding open-top buses) to two shades of green and also adopted a new simplified network, based on most routes radiating from Newport. The bus station in Newport was relocated nearby and redeveloped, with the previous site built over with shops.

During the summer, Southern Vectis also operates some open-topped buses on tourist routes: the Downs Breezer and the Needles Breezer.

Wightbus first started in the 1970s as the Isle of Wight County Council's County Bus and were branded Wightbus in 1997. They operate a smaller network of services that are not viable for a commercial operator, but that attract government subsidy. They took around 1,000 island students to and from school, until Southern Vectis took over all school services from September 2010.

FYTbus operates three bus routes in and around Freshwater, Yarmouth and Totland using a fleet of minibuses; they operate three routes:

- A: Yarmouth – Freshwater – Freshwater Bay;
- B: Freshwater – Totland Bay – Colwell Bay – Norton Green – Freshwater;
- C: Yarmouth – Freshwater Bay – Totland Bay – Colwell Bay – Freshwater – Yarmouth.

Cowes has currently the only park-and-ride bus site on the island; however, there has been talk of building one for Newport.

== Bus stations ==
There are three bus stations on the Isle of Wight, most services from them are run by Southern Vectis:

=== Newport ===
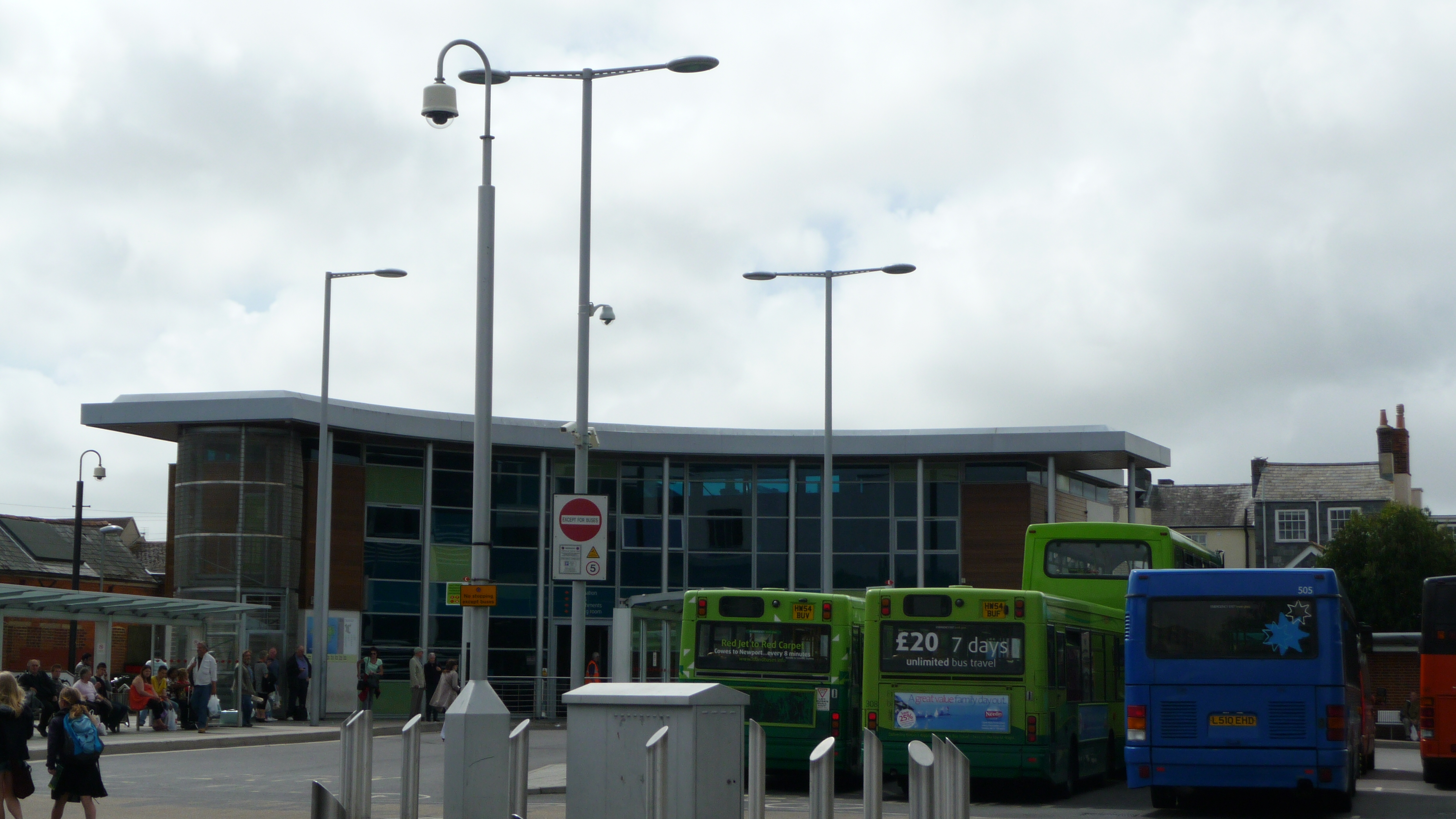
Newport Bus Interchange

Newport bus station is located in the town centre of Newport, on Orchard Street. The original 1960s bus station was demolished in late 2005 to make way for a retail development.

The present bus station features an indoor heated waiting area and an information desk. Seats and lighting have been installed and the entire bus station is a no-smoking area.

Newport town centre has bus lanes leading to the bus station, known as the 'Red Carpet'. However one section of the bus lane in South Street, close to the bus station, which was originally temporary while the bus station was being built, has been proved 'not legal', effectively meaning any other vehicle can use it.

=== Ryde ===
Ryde bus station is slightly smaller than Newport's and is located on the Esplanade near the Hovertravel terminal and Island Line railway station. Over time there have been plans to re-develop it into a new interchange as a gateway to the Island. However, none of these plans have so far come to fruition. Benches and litter bins removed for construction work have been replaced and the temporary Esplanade bus stops removed. In October 2009 the project was abandoned.

=== Yarmouth ===
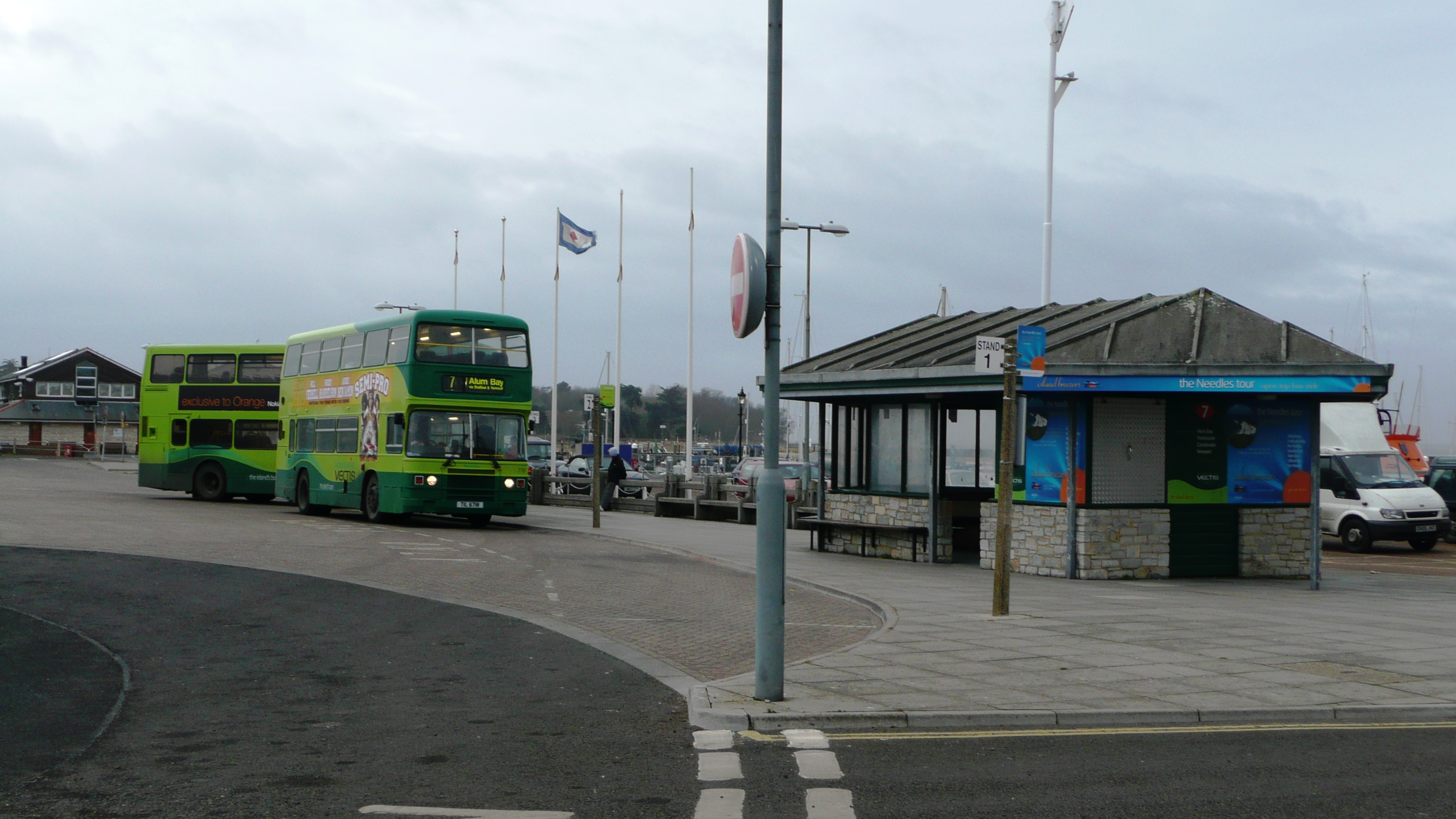
Yarmouth Bus Station

Yarmouth bus station, next to the Wightlink ferry terminal, serves Southern Vectis route 7 as well as The Needles tour during the summer. As well as three stands for buses, the area has parking for visiting coaches, often full in the summer. There is a large bus shelter for waiting passengers, which doubles as an information kiosk in the summer.

== Walking and cycling ==
The Island has an extensive network of byways, bridleways, footpaths and cycle tracks, including 520 miles (840 km) of public rights of way. Several long-distance paths are highlighted on Ordnance Survey maps and local signs, including a route around the whole island (the Isle of Wight Coastal Path), and smaller trails such as the Tennyson Trail and Worsley Trail. The island is also home to the Isle of Wight Walking Festival, which has taken place annually in May for ten years and now has over 200 different walks.

Sustrans National Cycle Network routes 22 and 23 have sections through the Isle of Wight, including off-road sections of route 23 between Cowes and Newport and Newport and Sandown along disused railway lines. There is a signed "round-the-island" cycle route primarily on road, as well as a 12-mile (19 km) on and off-road leisure route called the Sunshine Trail. The Island holds an annual Cycling Festival in July and the Isle of Wight Randonnee takes place on the May Bank holiday, a cycling race going over minor roads right around the island.

== Air ==
There are two small general aviation airfields on the island: Isle of Wight Airport at Sandown and Bembridge Airport. These are popular with day-trippers flying from the mainland in summer. Flights to and from London have been trialled, but proved unpopular and were discontinued. However, it was reported in 2007 that future plans could see the flight reinstated.

== Fixed link proposals ==
The construction of a fixed (tunnel or bridge) across the Solent has been proposed by a variety of groups over many years. However, proposals frequently divide opinion. As a result, no serious effort to construct a crossing has been made in recent times, despite high ferry costs.

=== Tramway proposal (2008) ===
One proposal in 2008 came from local company Civic Networks Ltd and businessman John Clewley in March 2008, which suggested a tramway to link Ryde to Gosport and rail networks on both sides. The plans also included a large new harbour at Ryde, with berthing facilities for four car and four passenger ferries and two container ships and replacement facilities for the harbour. Unlike previous proposals, it was met with more support from residents, as it would not risk increased volumes of traffic on the island's roads.

=== Pro-Link campaign (2014) ===
In late 2014, local pro-link campaigner Carl Feeney launched a Facebook group, IOW Fixed Link Campaign. A £3 billion undersea road tunnel proposal was published in October 2014 by Feeney's company Able Connections Ltd, under its operating name, Pro-Link. In 2017, the group released a poll of residents in which 3,280 people supported an idea. However, the survey was carried out by Pro-Link, rather than an independent company, using methods including SurveyMonkey and the UK Parliament petitions website, rather than contracting a major national polling company to carry out its own survey.

Pro-Link branded its campaign as the "Solent Freedom Tunnel", proceeding to launch a GoFundMe page in October 2018 with a target of £130,000 for a feasibility study to be commissioned from Arup Group. The page has raised £6,471 as of January 2020, and the group claims to have raised a further £14,000 from other sources.

=== 2019 general election ===
Pro link campaigner Feeney ran for the Isle of Wight constituency in the 2019 United Kingdom general election as an Independent Network candidate. He attracted criticism in December 2019 when he said his journey to campaign in East Cowes was "as if we had gone to another country", and went on to claim the Red Funnel terminal had the appearance of a "bomb site". He stated that the terminal had "stripped the souls and hopes from nearby residents". Feeney received 1,542 votes, less than previous independent candidates had achieved, and consequently lost his deposit. The No Fixed Link Campaign wrote an editorial piece in the County Press stating that it was declaring victory. Feeney stated that he would continue his campaign after a period of "rest with my family".

== See also ==
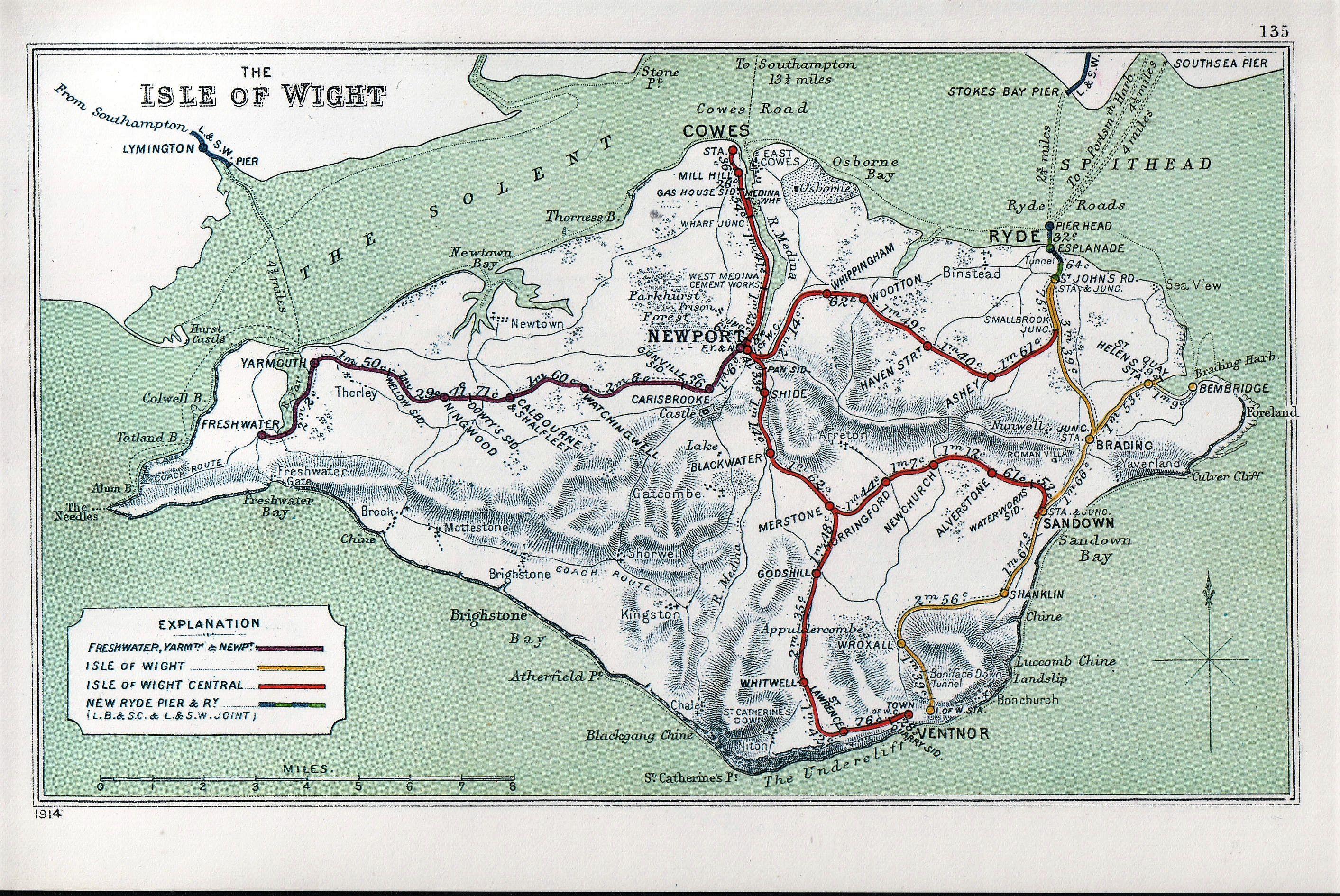
A 1914 Railway Clearing House map of lines on the Island, note the different owners and duplication.

- Isle of Wight ferry services
- Isle of Wight Bus & Coach Museum
