= Moss Motor Tours =

Bus and coach company

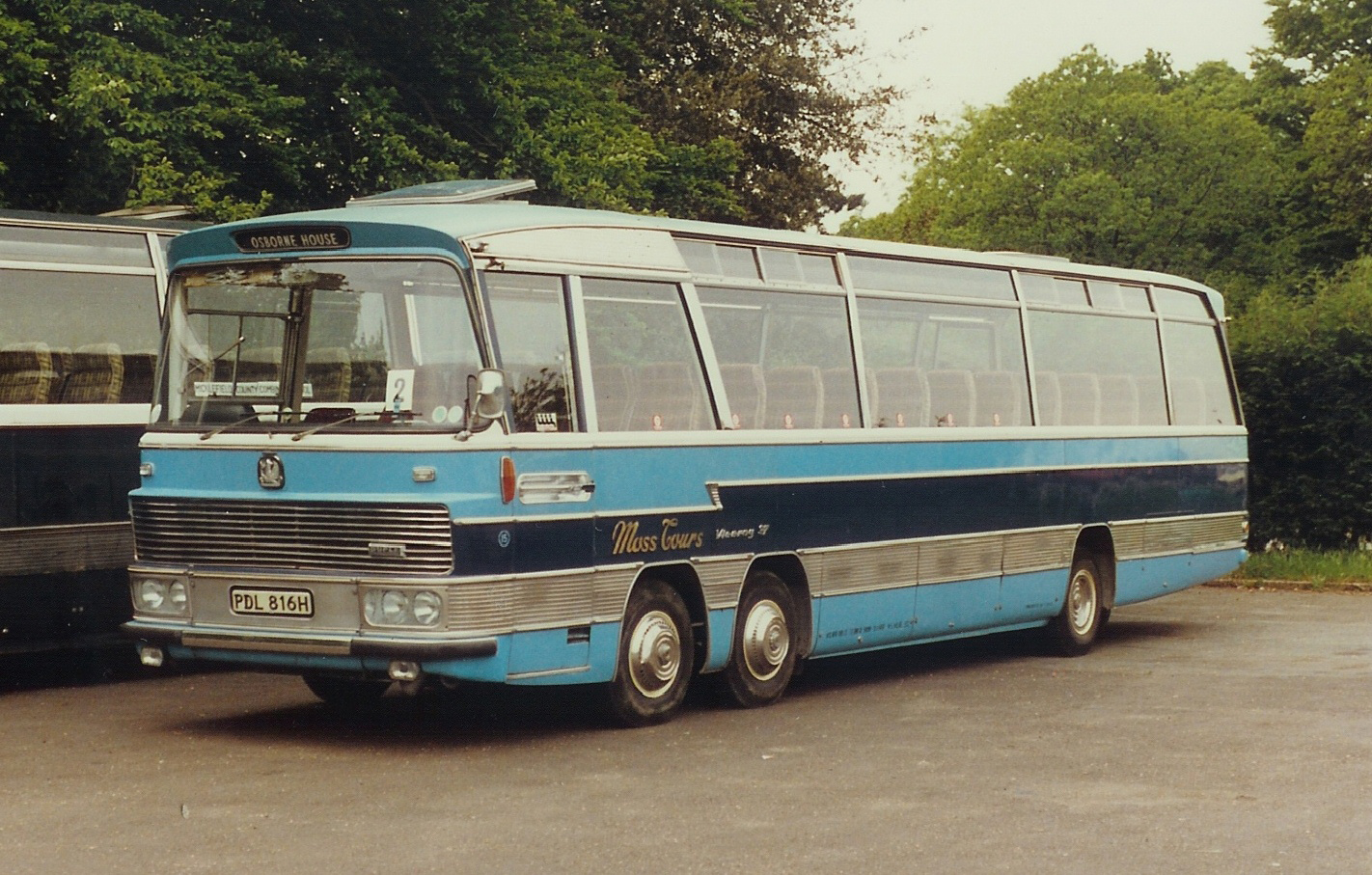
- Founded: 1921
- Headquarters: Sandown, Isle of Wight
- Service area: Isle of Wight
- Service type: Bus Services, Coach Tours & Private Hire

Moss Motor Tours Ltd. was a bus and coach company that operated on the Isle of Wight between 1921 and 1994. The company sold its assets in 1994 to various bus and coach providers on the Island and off. The name and "goodwill" of the company was purchased by Southern Vectis in 1994.

Following Southern Vectis' purchase by the Go-Ahead Group in 2005, "Moss Motors" was resurrected as one of several fleet names for the company's coach unit (also including, amongst others, Fountain Coaches and the West Wight Bus & Coach Company). "Moss Motors" was also used for a short time to brand a commuter coach service into Newport. In January 2013, a change in management and significant investment in new vehicles (mostly buses, not coaches) meant that these classic fleetnames were abandoned in favour of one "home to school" brand "Vectis Blue".

== History ==
Moss Motor Tours was started in 1921. The company operated several bus routes and tours of the Island to cater to tourists, these included trips to see cruise liners, mystery tours, and round the island tours. The company also operated private hire vehicles. Moss' was based in Sandown, Isle of Wight and had shops where tickets for the various tours were sold. One of Moss' coaches is now viewable at the Isle of Wight Bus Museum.

Post-deregulation, Moss Motor Tours operated several bus routes against the incumbent privatised bus operator Southern Vectis, these typically used red buses with 'Blue Ferret' branding.

Most if not all original Moss Motor Tours coaches were bought new and were kept inside for much of the winter, in fact as testament to this, several of the coaches left from the company's sale in 1994 are still in use by both mainland and Island operators, for example, island based Gange's Coaches, still use the last coach purchased by Moss - "Island Princess" in its original blue and cream livery.

== Gallery ==
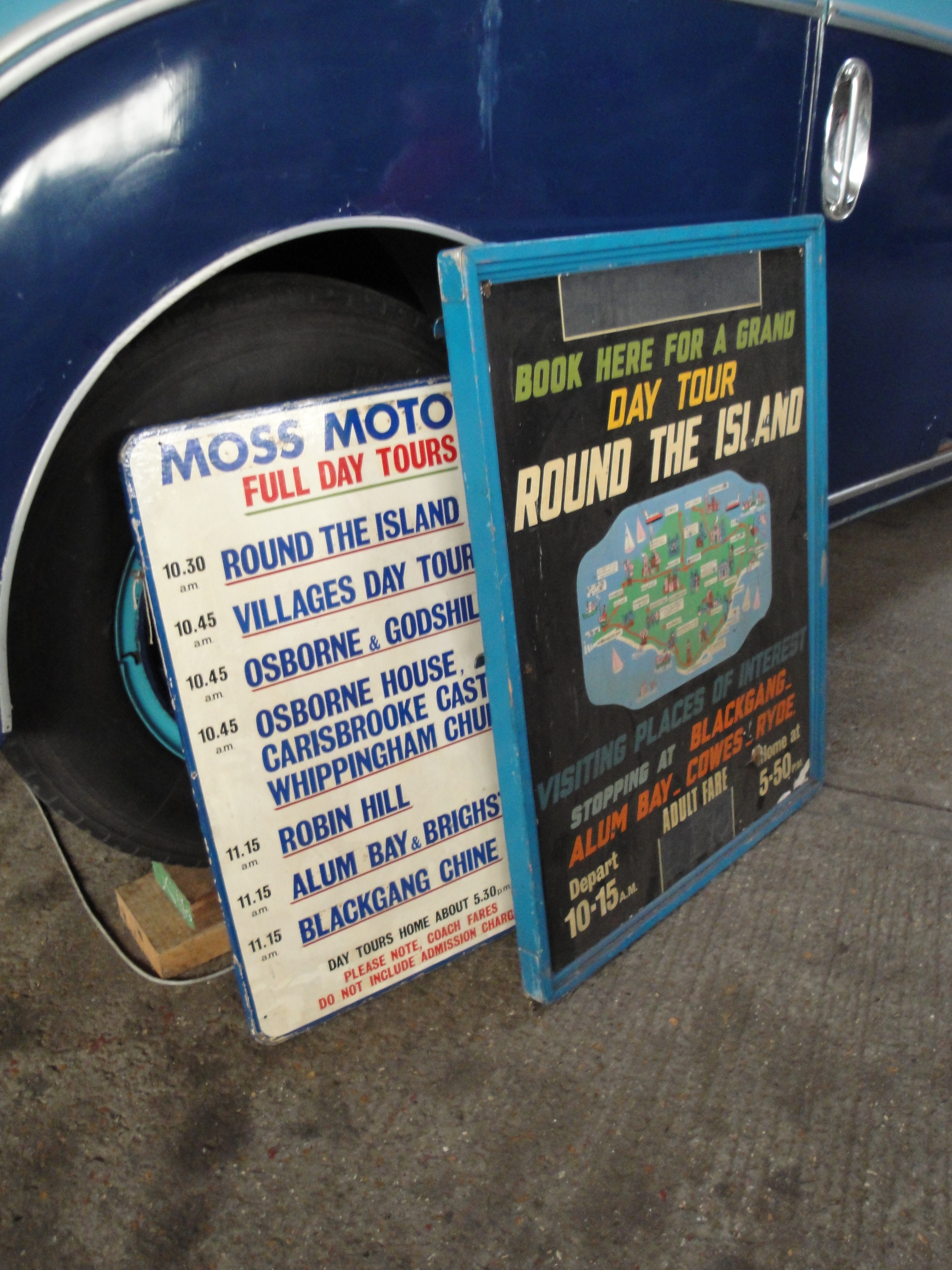
Some of the many promotional noticeboards used by Moss to promote their coach tours.

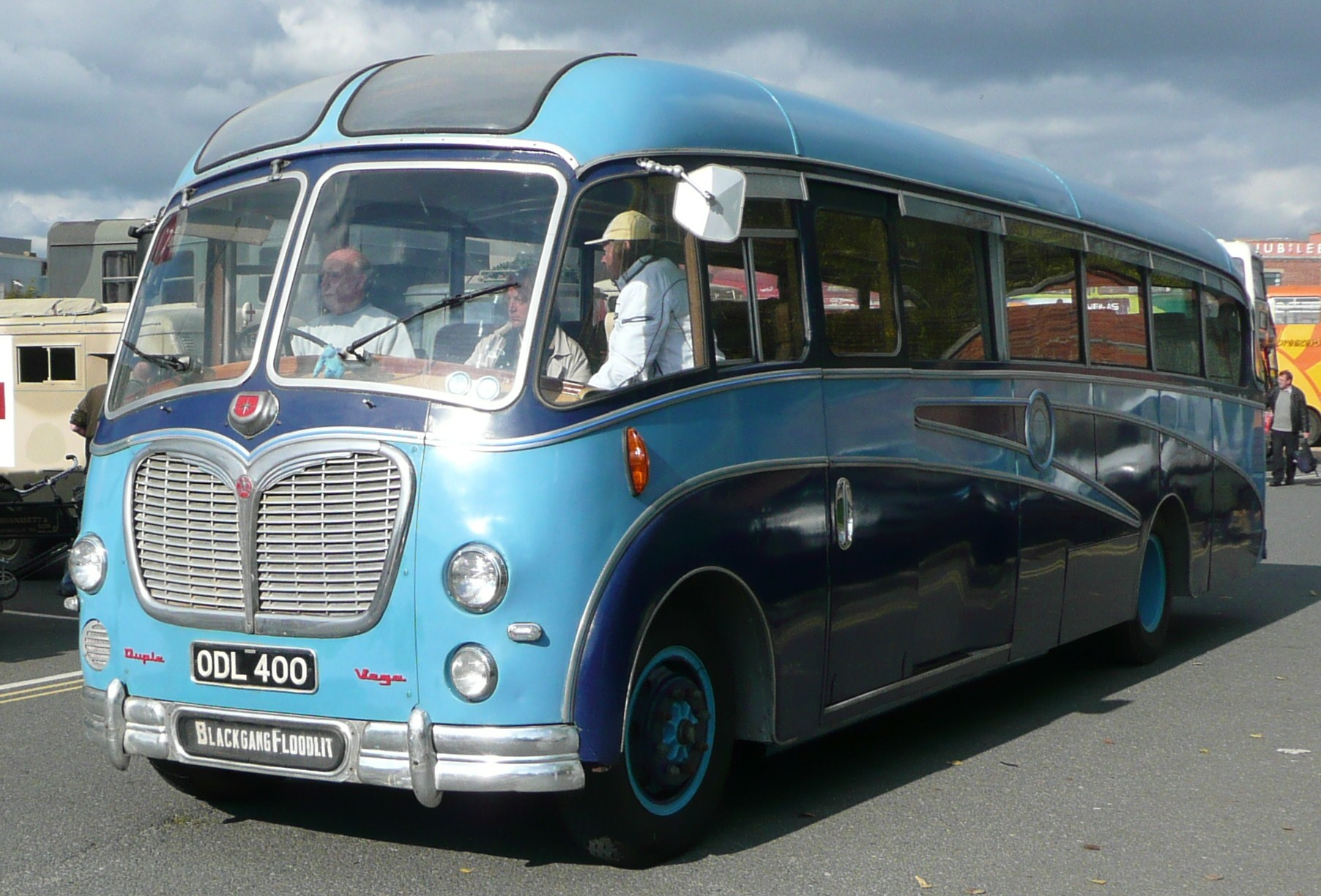
Preserved ex-Moss Motor Tours 1957 Bedford SBG/Duple Vega, at the 2008 Isle of Wight Bus Museum running day.

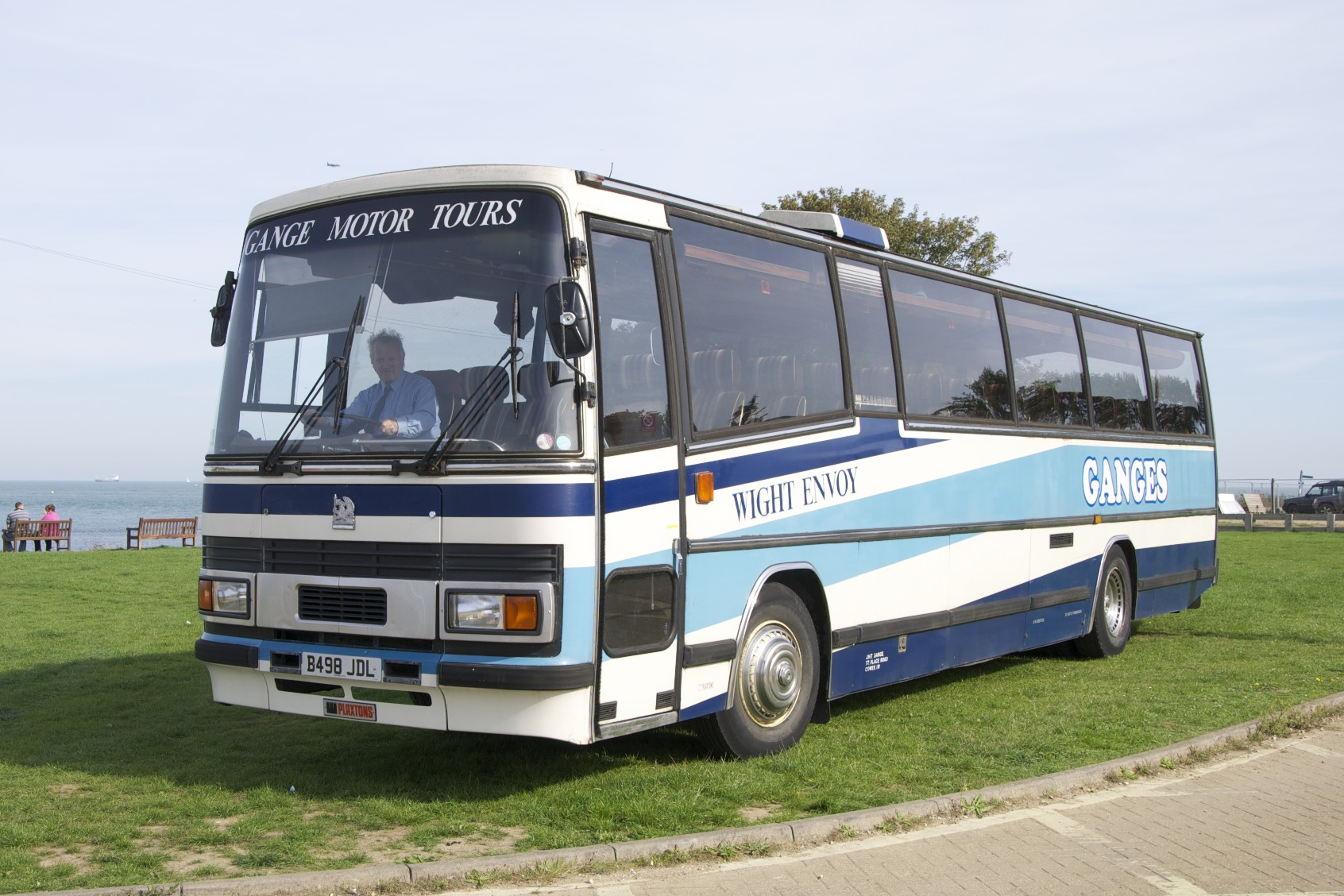
Former Moss Coach "Wight Envoy", pictured operating by Gange's Coaches.

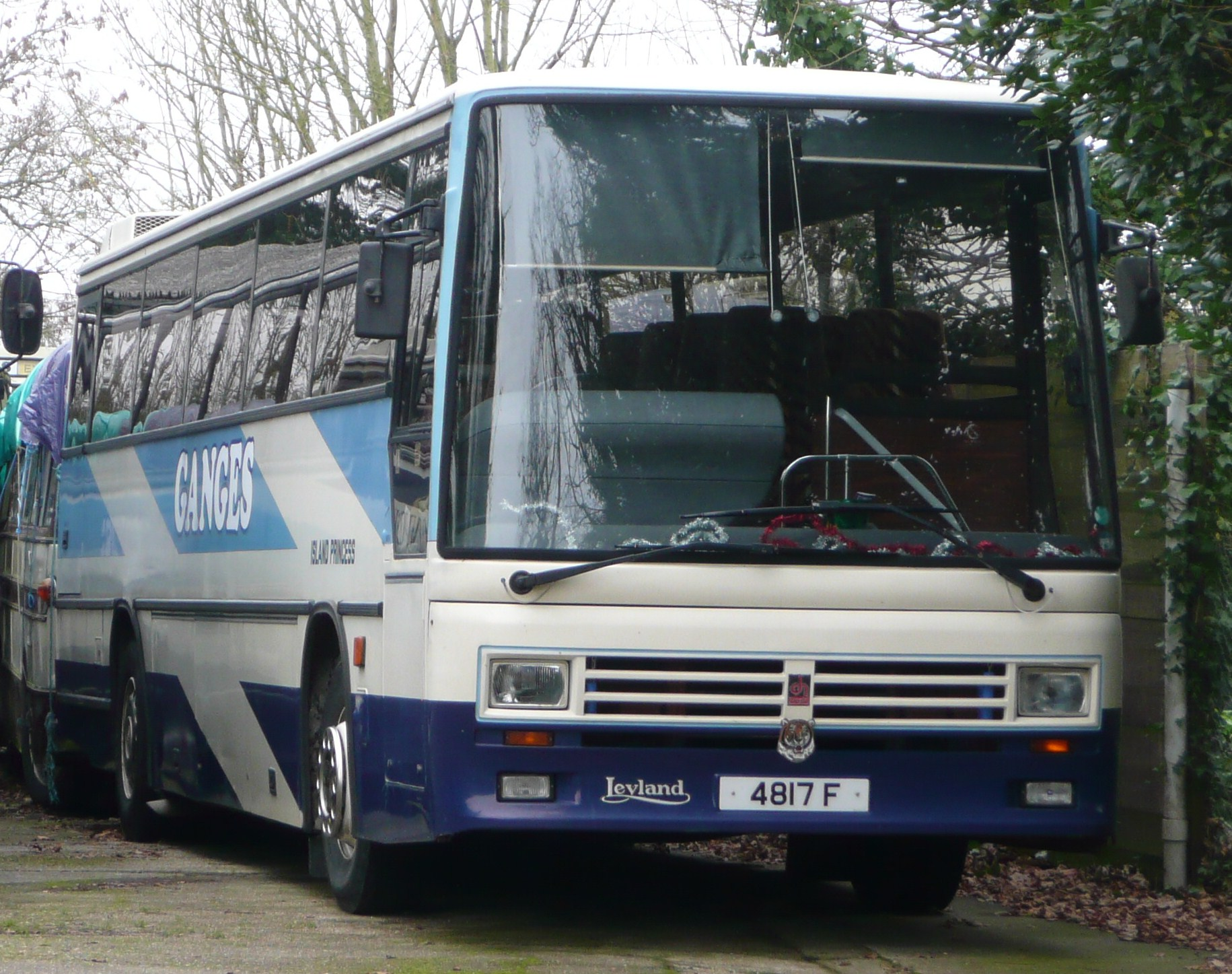
Former Moss Coach "Island Princess", the last coach purchased by Moss, also part of the Gange's Coaches fleet.
