= Southern Vectis =

Bus operator on the Isle of Wight, England

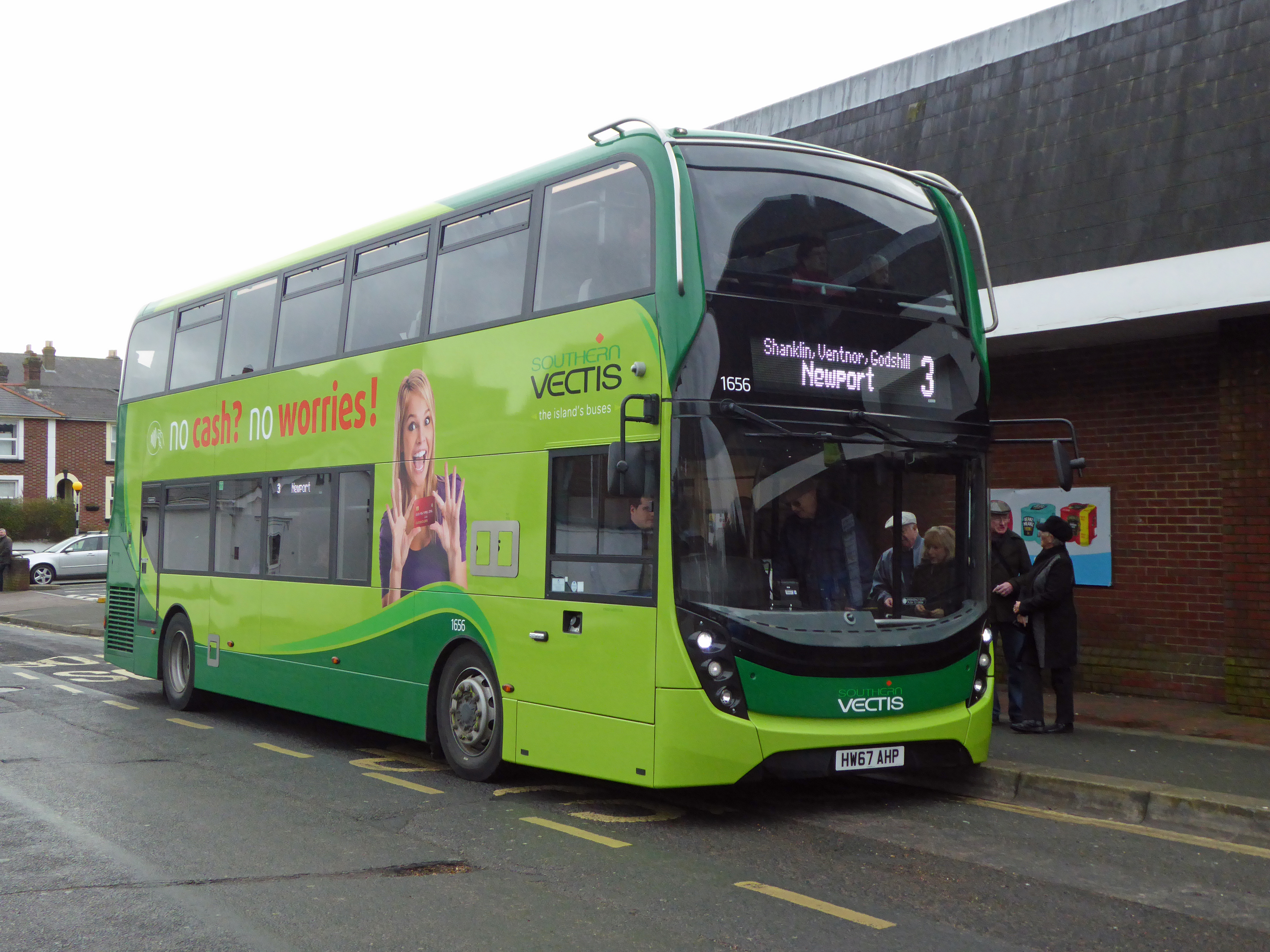
- Alexander Dennis Enviro400 MMC in Shanklin in January 2018
- Parent: Go-Ahead Group
- Founded: 1921; 105 years ago
- Headquarters: Newport, Isle of Wight, England
- Service area: Isle of Wight
- Service type: Bus and coach
- Fleet: 130 (June 2025)
- Operator: Go South Coast
- General Manager: Richard Tydesley
- Website: www.islandbuses.info

Southern Vectis is a bus operator on the Isle of Wight, founded in 1921 as Dodson and Campbell. It became the Vectis Bus Company in 1923. The company was purchased by Southern Railway before being nationalised in 1969. In 1987, the company was re-privatised and in July 2005, it became a subsidiary of Go-Ahead Group.

== History ==
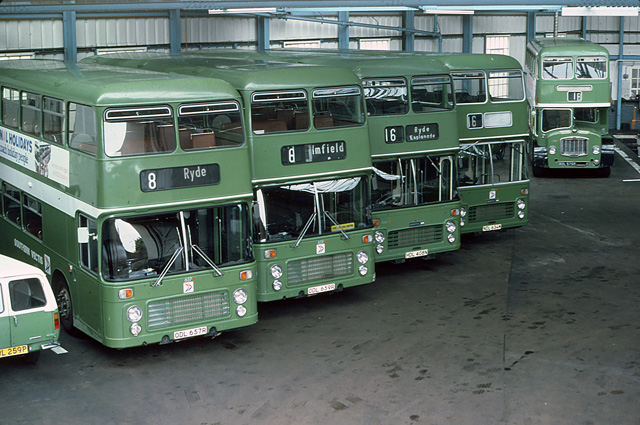
ECW bodied Bristol VRs in National Bus Company livery at Ryde depot in 1979

Past lettering and logos

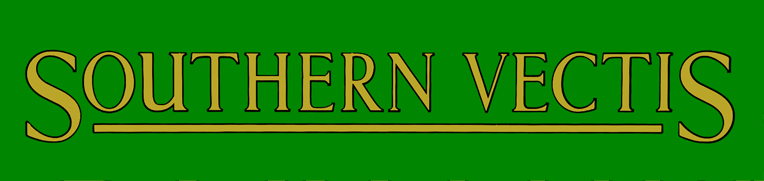
Tilling Group gold lettering pre-1972

National Bus Company (1972–1986)

The logo used from 2006 to 2013

The logo used from 2013 to 2023

Southern Vectis can trace its origins back to 1921, when a bus company named Dodson & Campbell (later renamed Dodsons Bros) was founded in Cowes, running three vehicles between Newport and Cowes. In 1923, the company was renamed to the Vectis Bus Company; Vectis being the ancient Roman name for the Isle of Wight. In 1929, half the shares in the company were purchased by Southern Railway and incorporated as a subsidiary named the Southern Vectis Omnibus Company Limited. In 1932, the Dodsons retired from the business and relinquished their remaining shares in the company to the BAT-Tilling Group.

Southern Vectis was nationalised in November 1948 when the Tilling Group sold its operations to the government, forming the British Transport Commission; this coincided with the nationalisation of Southern Railways, forming the Southern Region of British Railways, that same year. After passing to the Transport Holding Company (THC) following the BTC's abolition under the provisions of the Transport Act 1962, Southern Vectis was later among the THC operators that passed into the ownership of the state-owned National Bus Company (NBC) on 1 January 1969, following the passage of the Transport Act 1968.

=== Deregulation ===
Gange's Minicoaches alongside a Southern Vectis minibus, late 1980s

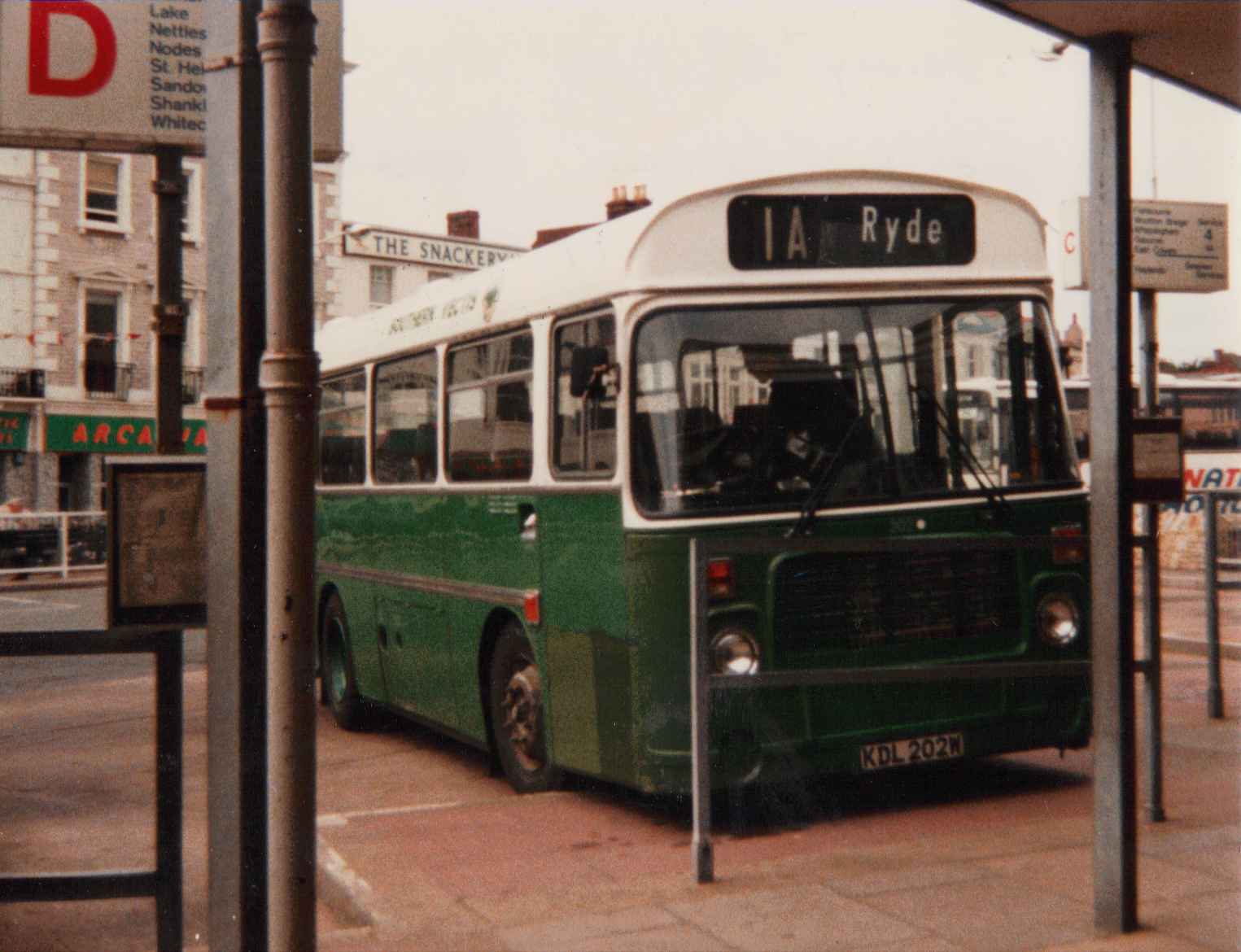
ECW bodied Bristol LH in post-deregulation livery at Ryde bus station on route 1A in June 1987

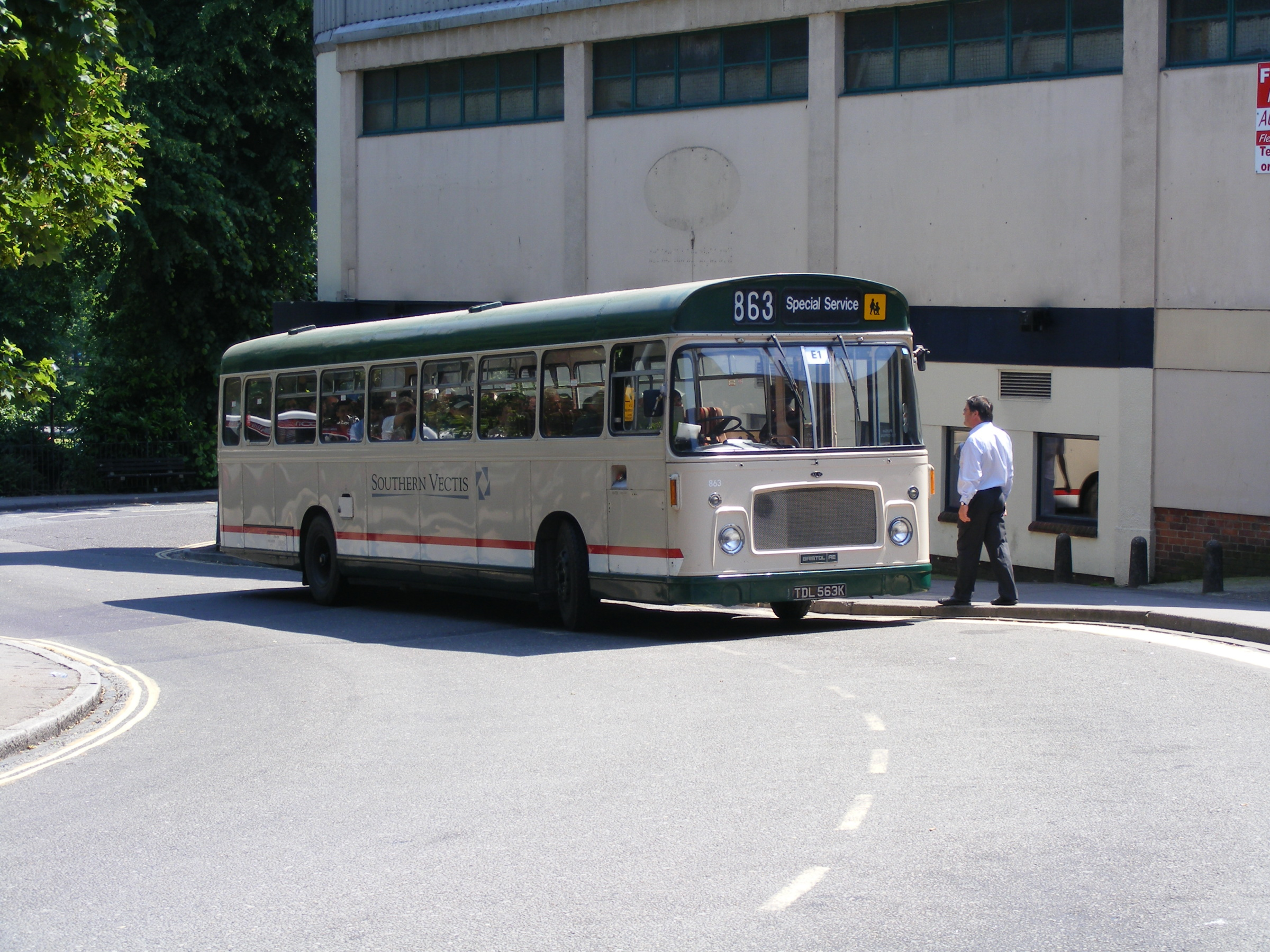
Preserved ECW bodied Bristol RE in post-1995 cream, red and green livery in June 2008

In the run-up to the deregulation of bus services on 26 October 1986 and ensuing breakup of the NBC under the provisions of the Transport Act 1985, Southern Vectis was sold to a management buyout team in October 1986, beating a rival bid from the Carlton PSV coach dealership in Rotherham, South Yorkshire; as part of the deal, Southern Vectis also acquired Newport bus station.

Following deregulation, several competitors to Southern Vectis commenced operations the Isle of Wight and others increased their existing services. These included Gange's Minicoaches, Grand Hotel Tours, Island Travel (Cooke's Coaches of Porchfield), Moss Motor Tours, Seaview Services' RedLynx and Wiltax of Shanklin. Island Travel and Gange's Minicoaches established routes between Cowes and Ryde.

The newly privatised Southern Vectis responded with 'bus war' tactics, including running buses immediately ahead of competitors on unregistered 'duplicate' services to beat them to waiting passengers. After Gange's Minicoaches complained to the Traffic Commissioner for South East England that Southern Vectis were running a 'flying squad' of drivers ahead of their buses, Southern Vectis were found to be running anti-competitive practices and were hit a condition on their operating licence that stipulated only one vehicle was run on a registered duplicate service.

As well as this, Southern Vectis refused to allow competitors to use its Newport Bus Station, resulting in Gange's Minicoaches complaining to the Office of Fair Trading (OFT), who ruled that Southern Vectis must allow competitors to use the bus station or face the Competition Commission. As a result, Gange's was offered stand F in Ryde bus station and a stand in the Newport bus station. Gange's did not agree to the charges for either and continued to operate from the opposite side of Ryde bus station, located on council land, and the South Street bus stop in Newport until its bus services eventually ceased.

In response to the Isle of Wight County Council removing an experimental bus lane on Newport's congested high street after two months, in February 1990, Southern Vectis announced it would cut back its bus network by 5% from 10 June 1990, with some Sunday services and evening journeys on services around the island withdrawn. Southern Vectis stated these services had to be withdrawn to recoup costs incurred due to service delays from the lane's removal. The County Council responded by taking on the withdrawn routes through its in-house County Bus operation and by considering tendering services to other operators to break up Southern Vectis' near monopoly of services.

In 1991, Southern Vectis' duplication tactics were seen again when they shadowed council-contracted buses run by Norman Baker Taxis and Wiltax Buses. In response to criticism by other operators for its tactics, around this time, Southern Vectis had started to franchise its routes, offering competing operators to run council tendered services for a reduced fee compared to the tender price.

==== Outside ventures ====
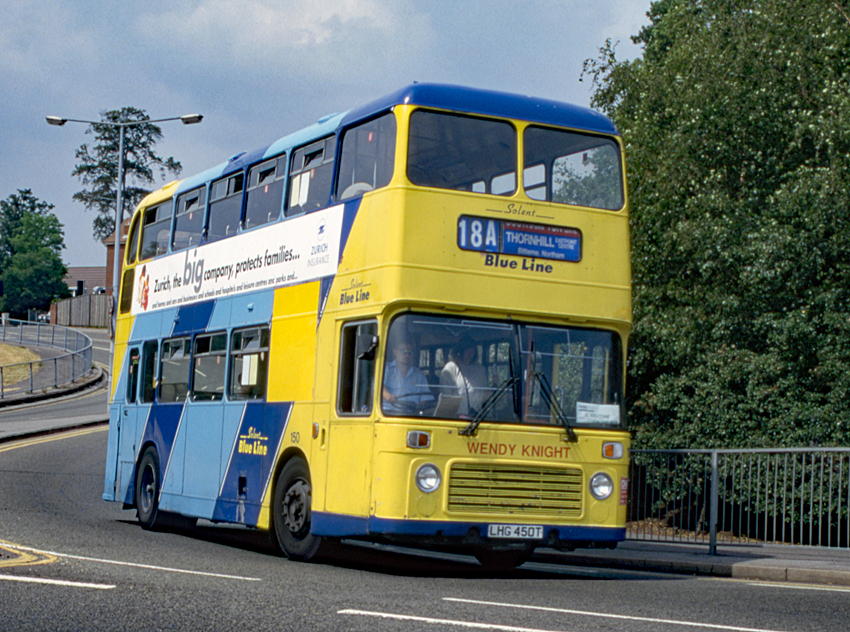
Solent Blue Line ECW bodied Bristol VRT in Bitterne, Southampton in June 1996

Southern Vectis also moved into other business areas on the Isle of Wight. As well as running a coaching subsidiary named Fountain Coaches, originally assimilated into Southern Vectis by the NBC in 1969, the company bought a self-drive van hire firm and package tour operator Vikki Osborne (IW) Holidays. It also bought two Ford Granada taxis, which ran from the Cowes pontoon, and began taxibus services which continued until 1989. In 1990, Iveco entered an agreement with Southern Vectis Commercials, the commercial vehicle repair wing of the company, to open a truck service dealership on the island.

In April 1987, Southern Vectis crossed the Solent into the English mainland, founding Solent Blue Line in Southampton in response to competitive threats made by Southampton Citybus in the Southern Daily Echo. The new operations used older Southern Vectis buses and secondhand double-deckers painted in yellow and two-tone blue livery, which competed directly and aggressively on Southampton Citybus services. In response, Southampton Citybus employed second-hand AEC Routemasters and upped frequencies on its services to retain passengers. During October, Southern Vectis purchased the Southampton operations of Stagecoach Holdings' Hampshire Bus operations, merging the routes, 80 buses and 200 staff of the company into Solent Blue Line and therefore making it the second largest bus operator in the city.

As well as its bus war in neighbouring Southampton, Southern Vectis attempted to expand further across the Solent through bidding to purchase municipal bus company Portsmouth City Transport (PCT) from Portsmouth City Council. In April 1988, Southern Vectis was named the winning bidder for PCT, purchasing the company for £700,000 (equivalent to £1,949,000 in 2025) with plans to rename it 'Green Line' and integrate it into Solent Blue Line; an initial bid of £1.15 million (equivalent to £3,202,000 in 2025) was rejected in order for the competing PCT management team to improve their offer. The sale, criticised by the Transport and General Workers Union and alleged to have initially been a joint effort between Southern Vectis and Badgerline, was initially halted by members of Portsmouth City Council using a standing order to force a vote on rescinding the sale, which was rejected in a council vote. The sale was eventually called off a week before completion when Portsmouth City Council rejected a revised offer after Southern Vectis found Portsmouth City Transport to be in poor financial standing.

Having tried and failed to purchase the company while it was being privatised earlier that year, in June 1987, Southern Vectis entered into competition with Wilts & Dorset in Bournemouth and Poole through founding Badger Vectis, a joint minibus venture between themselves and Badgerline which eventually ceased in April 1988.

In the aftermath of the Cold War, following the completion of similar work in Scotland and France, Southern Vectis began a consultancy business for newly privatised bus companies in the former Eastern Bloc, starting in 1992 with the completion of a market analysis report for Göltzschtal-Verkehr GmbH of Auerbach in the former East Germany, which had been handed to the local authority after German reunification and was reporting losses equivalent to £1 million (equivalent to £2,300,000 in 2025). Vectis expanded further by acquiring a 20% stake in Polish municipal operator Kaliskie Linie Autobusowe in 1994, cumulating in Vectis employees driving a double-decker bus to an event celebrating 50 years of bus travel in Kalisz in September 1995, followed by the launch of a second joint venture with Chełmskie Linie Autobusowe in Chełm in 1997. Vectis also joined Hampshire County Council in exchange visits with Chișinău, Moldova during 1997 to help train employees of the city's municipal transport company.

Southern Vectis entered into environmental management in April 1995 with the purchase of a 65% controlling share in Vikoma International, an oil spill management company based in Cowes. The following October, Southern Vectis was listed on the Alternative Investment Market of the London Stock Exchange, trading shares at a middle price of 43p. Southern Vectis later acquired hovercraft and light rail seating manufacturer Air Vehicles Ltd, moving this and Vikoma into a specialised industrial division of the company in June 1997. After acquiring Peterlee fibreglass manufacturer FRP as well as Eastleigh septic tank manufacturer Conder Products, this division was eventually split from Southern Vectis in 2001 into a new company, Conder Environmental Plc.

Also in 1995, Southern Vectis launched the Train, Bus and Coach Hotline (also known as the TBC Hotline), a premium-rate telephone number providing timetable information across the United Kingdom seven days a week. Support for the TBC Hotline from major bus operating groups led to Southern Vectis publishing the 'Great British Bus Timetable' for distribution around the country, as well as smaller 'Getting Around' timetable books concentrating on networks in Wales and the Scottish Highlands and Islands. Despite initially gaining the financial support of the Department of the Environment, Transport and the Regions (DETR) in 1998, Southern Vectis' involvement in the TBC Hotline began to be wound down when they announced it was franchising a new call centre to Newstel Media in Glasgow instead of remaining in Newport, while bus operating groups began pulling their support for the Great British Bus Timetable at the end of 2000 in favour of the DETR's own PTI 2000 telephone line and new operator websites.

=== Go-Ahead Group ownership ===
Plaxton President bodied Volvo B7TL in the company's 2006 livery at Newport bus station in February 2010

In July 2005, Southern Vectis was sold to the Go-Ahead Group, with the company and Solent Blue Line becoming part of Go South Coast.

In 2008, Southern Vectis once again began competing with the Isle of Wight Council's Wightbus school services, duplicating routes and claiming term ticket fees for student passengers from the council. In September 2010, the council engaged Southern Vectis to operate many school bus routes. In 2012, a £28 million eight-year school transport contract was agreed between the council and Southern Vectis, with 'closed-door' school services beginning in October 2012 under the brand name Vectis Blue using a fleet of Optare Solo SRs and Alexander Dennis Enviro400s painted in a two-tone blue livery. In 2021, these services were integrated back under the Southern Vectis brand.

In October 2009, Southern Vectis launched a website promoting a car scrappage scheme, which offered island residents a 12-month season ticket for bus journeys if they scrapped their car. The company said five vehicles were scrapped in the first fortnight and that it had received around 6,000 enquiries within this period.

== Services ==
As of 2026, Southern Vectis operated a network of 42 public, sightseeing and school bus services across the Isle of Wight. Night bus variants of some public bus routes run on Friday and Saturday nights.

=== Open-top buses ===
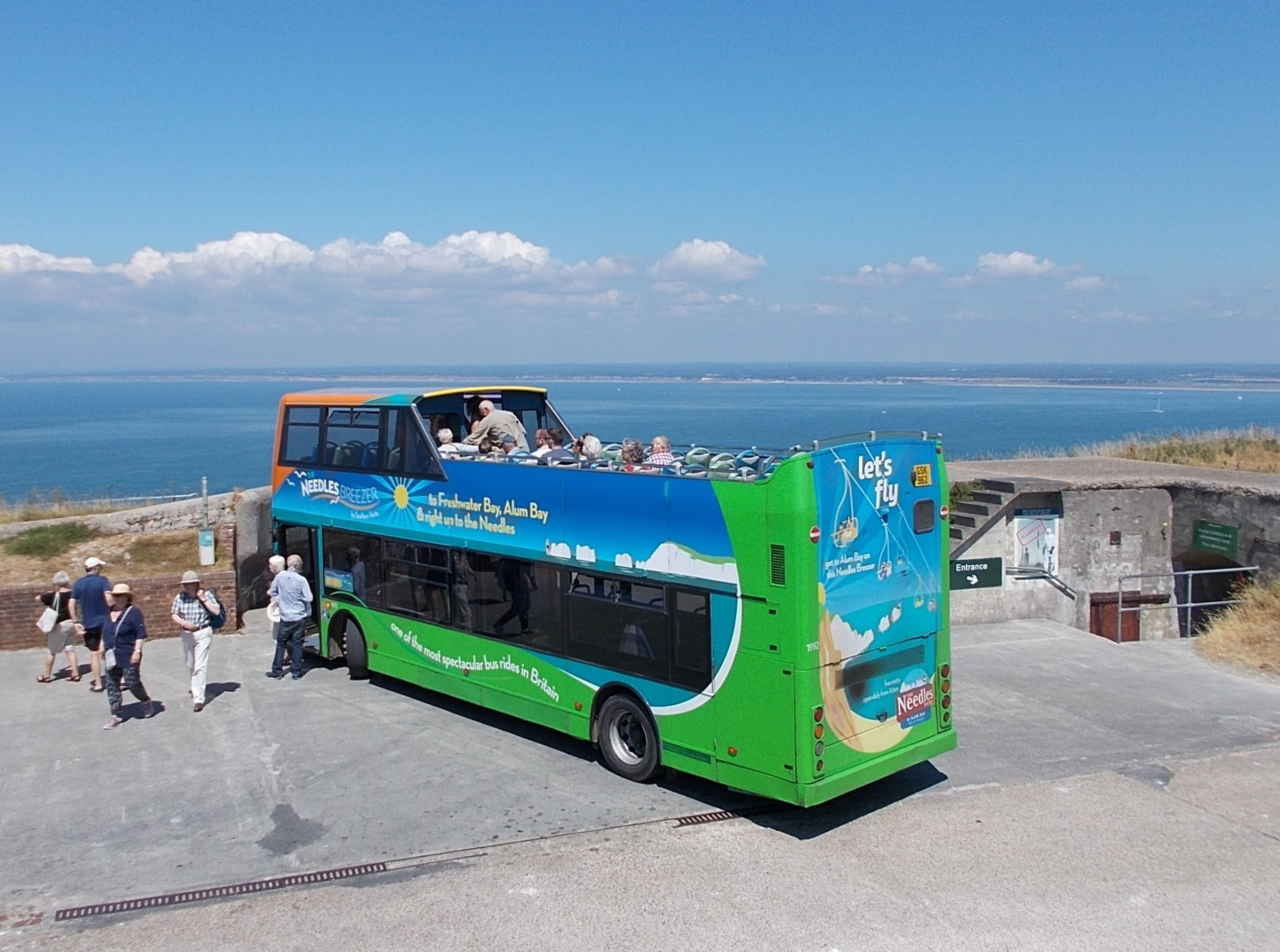
'Needles Breezer' open-top bus at The Needles (2018)

Southern Vectis's Open Top Tours (orange and yellow livery) ran two circular summer routes to tourist destinations. In 2007, Open Top Tours was rebranded Island Breezers (yellow and blue livery). Other open-top tours by Southern Vectis included The Needles Breezer, The Downs Breezer, The Sandown Bay Breeze" (finished 2012).

In 2007, an Island Coaster service started between Ryde and Alum Bay with a £10 all-day ticket, or longer period tickets for residents. The Island Coaster followed the route of two former services, the 12 from Ryde to Sandown and the 7/7A from Sandown to Alum Bay. Stops were at Freshwater Bay and Blackgang Chine, linking them with Ventnor, Shanklin, Sandown and Ryde. To get between Blackgang Chine and Brook near Brighstone, the service used the Military Road.

The 2008 season began on 15 March and finished on 2 November 2008. Route X4 was removed (although still displayed on buses). There was no stop at the Bembridge Coast Hotel or Sandown Esplanade. In 2009, there was only one morning and one afternoon journey each way, one of which terminated or started in Shanklin rather than Ryde and reached from Freshwater Bay to Yarmouth, but not reaching Alum Bay. Coaches were used rather than buses.

In 2011, the Shanklin Steamer began (to Old Village, Shanklin Esplanade, Shanklin Chine and the Shanklin railway station).

=== Tourist road trains ===
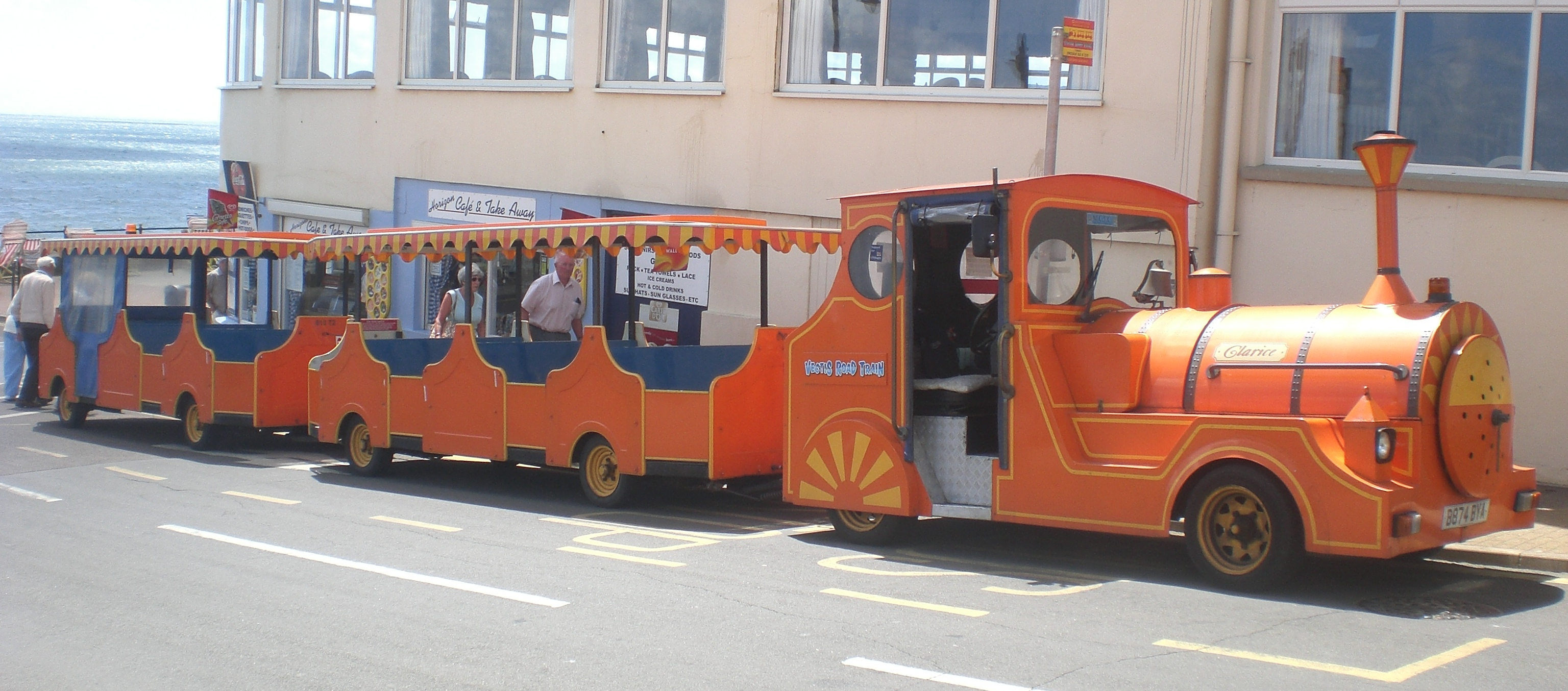
An Isle of Wight Council Dotto road train

Until September 2009, three tourist road trains operated along the seafront of Ryde, Shanklin and Sandown. The services were run by Southern Vectis under contract to Isle of Wight Council. In April 2010, it was announced that the vehicles would retire due to maintenance costs. In January 2011, the Dotto Trains were sold to a dealer in Llandudno.

=== Coach transport ===
Southern Vectis' involvement in coaching had varied through the years; early in the company's history the firm took no interest in coaching, preferring to leave the field to others. However, the company became involved in coaching through acquisition and conglomeration.

Some buses had previously been acquired from Fountain Coaches. The company had been assimilated into Southern Vectis when the National Bus Company rationalised in 1969. West Wight Bus & Coach Company and four of its coaches had been purchased by Southern Vectis in 1987. Moss Motor Tours was purchased by Southern Vectis in 1994. Wightrollers' 11 coaches were purchased by Go South Coast in July 2011. Southern Vectis employed staff from the firm.

=== Other services ===
The company has been involved in Isle of Wight events such as the Isle of Wight Festival and the Bestival. Additional buses were brought to the island. During the Isle of Wight Festival, extra shuttle services were run from Lymington to Yarmouth Wightlink ferry terminal; from the Southampton to East Cowes Red Funnel ferry terminal; and from the Portsmouth to Fishborne and Portsmouth to Ryde Wightlink ferry terminal and Fastcat passenger boat terminal.

In 2003, Southern Vectis started The Pink Peril, a segregated school service aimed at deterring vandalism and antisocial behaviour by misbehaving students. The service made of the oldest bus in the Southern Vectis fleet painted in an "uncool" pink, equipped with CCTV cameras, no heating and uncomfortable seating. The service ran longer than conventional school services, with five minutes extra travel time added for each incident aboard the bus.

In 2009, the company ran the Sailbus during Cowes Week after the council ceased operating it. There was decreased patronage due to new fares and the service did not run the following year.

== Fares and subsidies ==
Southern Vectis has increased its fares to reflect its market position and lack of effective competition. Fares have also reflected the need to provide free transport to the large population of elderly people on the Isle of Wight.

Students under 19 in full-time education on the Isle of Wight previously received discounted fares under the Isle of Wight Council's Student Rider scheme. In July 2010, after cuts in funding from the government to local authorities, the scheme was ended.

Island residents and visitors living in England over the qualifying age or with a disability previously travelled free in the council area at any time of day, under the English National Concessionary Travel Scheme. In 2007, the Isle of Wight council reduced its reimbursement to Southern Vectis for free-travelling passengers from 76% to 46%. By 2009, concessionary travel accounted for just under half of all journeys on Southern Vectis. In 2010, free travel was restricted to off-peak times, reflecting the approach of the majority of English councils.

On 17 March 2008, Southern Vectis ended several evening, night and Sunday routes. Details of the service cuts emerged soon afterwards. On 1 September 2008, routes 27, 28 and 29 ended.

In 2009, another subsidy decrease occurred. Routes 4 and 5, some journeys on route 6, routes 14 and 16 were withdrawn. That same year, Southern Vectis staff went on strike for three days over pay.

In 2017, Southern Vectis introduced a contactless payment system. In 2021, Tap On Tap Off began, a contactless ticket-free payment system enabling capped daily fares.

== Fleet and depots ==
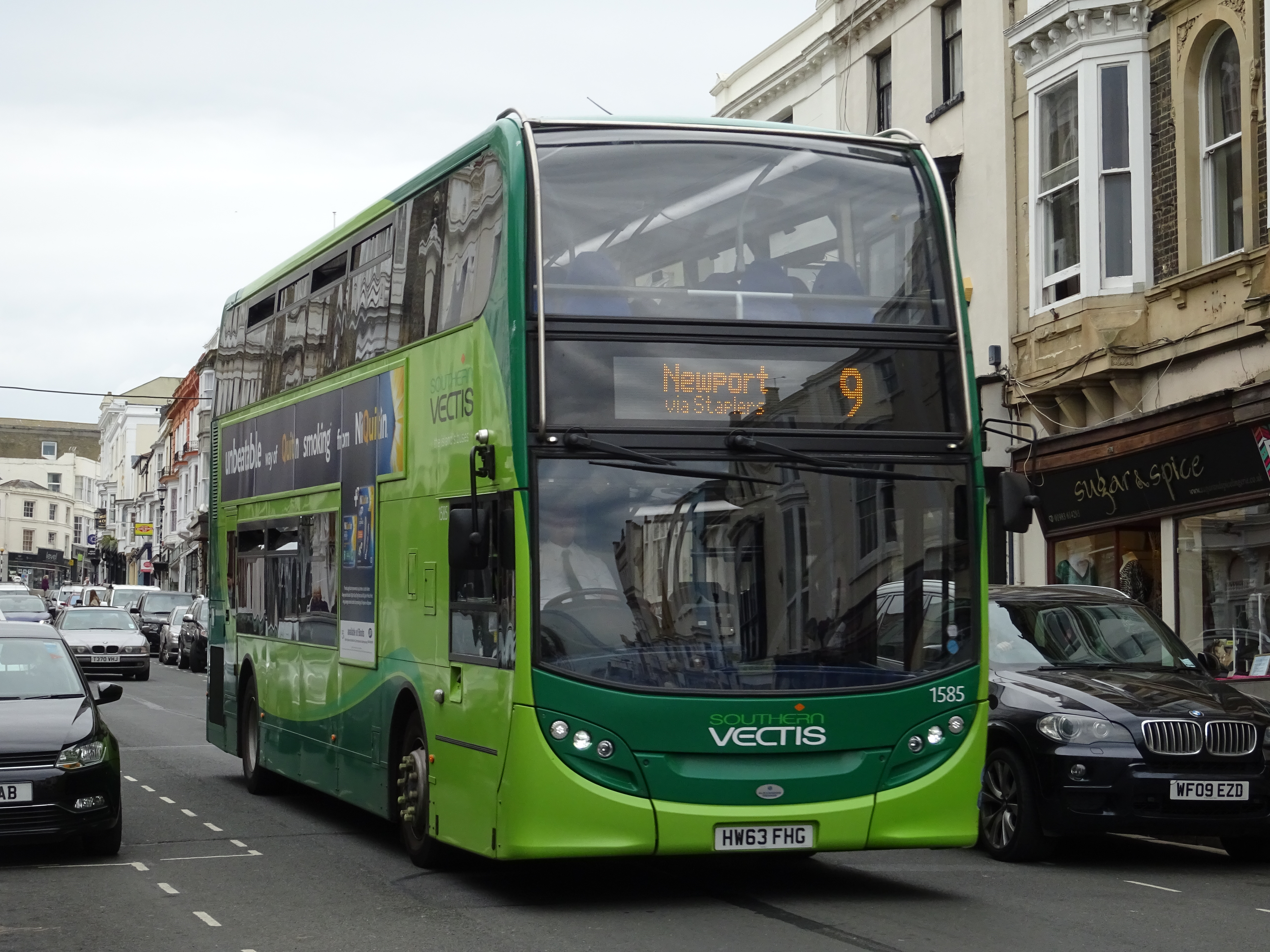
Alexander Dennis Enviro400 in Ryde in May 2016

As of June 2025, Southern Vectis operated a fleet of 130 buses. Most of the fleet is based at the Nelson Road, Newport garage, with the remainder based at outstations around the island.

In 2010, Southern Vectis closed its garage in Park Road, Ryde, retaining a neighbouring yard for school bus and coach operation until 2012. After plans to redevelop the garage site fell through, Ryde garage reopened in 2015 as the new site of the Isle of Wight Bus & Coach Museum. Another former garage, at Pier Street, Ventnor, was put up for auction in December 2020 with planning permission for two shops and 10 flats, and after the auction listing was withdrawn and relisted in 2021, plans were approved by the County Council in September 2026 for the depot to be demolished.

In March 2024, Go South Coast and the Isle of Wight Council made a successful bid for £12.7 million of central government Zero Emissions Bus Regional Areas (ZEBRA) funding for 22 new battery-electric buses, which was subsequently increased by a further nine following the awarding of an additional £4.7 million through the ZEBRA2 scheme. Following the installation of charging facilities at Newport depot, a fleet of 31 Wright StreetDeck Electroliner double-deckers were delivered to Southern Vectis and began entering service from late February 2026.

=== Livery ===
In March 2006, Southern Vectis rebranded its buses to a new Best Impressions livery of two shades of green and a new logo and slogan, "the island's buses". This was refreshed by Best Impressions in 2014 to incorporate a large green swoop towards the back of the vehicles, similar to the Vectis Blue livery. Before 2014, most open-top routes had blue and orange livery, with Island Breezers branding. This was revised in 2014, when the Needles Breezer received a blue, green and orange livery, reminiscent of Go South Coast's Purbeck Breezers. This livery extended to the rest of the Island Breezers fleet as the buses were replaced or repainted.

== Incidents ==
Early in the morning of 20 June 2025, a double-decker bus used for the Isle of Wight Festival, operating between the festival near Newport and Sandown Airport, caught fire. Emergency services were called at 00:40 BST to Newport Road, and the driver of the bus escaped without injury.
