= Newport bus station (Isle of Wight) =

Bus station on the Isle of Wight, England

Coordinates: 50.698°N 1.294°W

Newport Bus Station
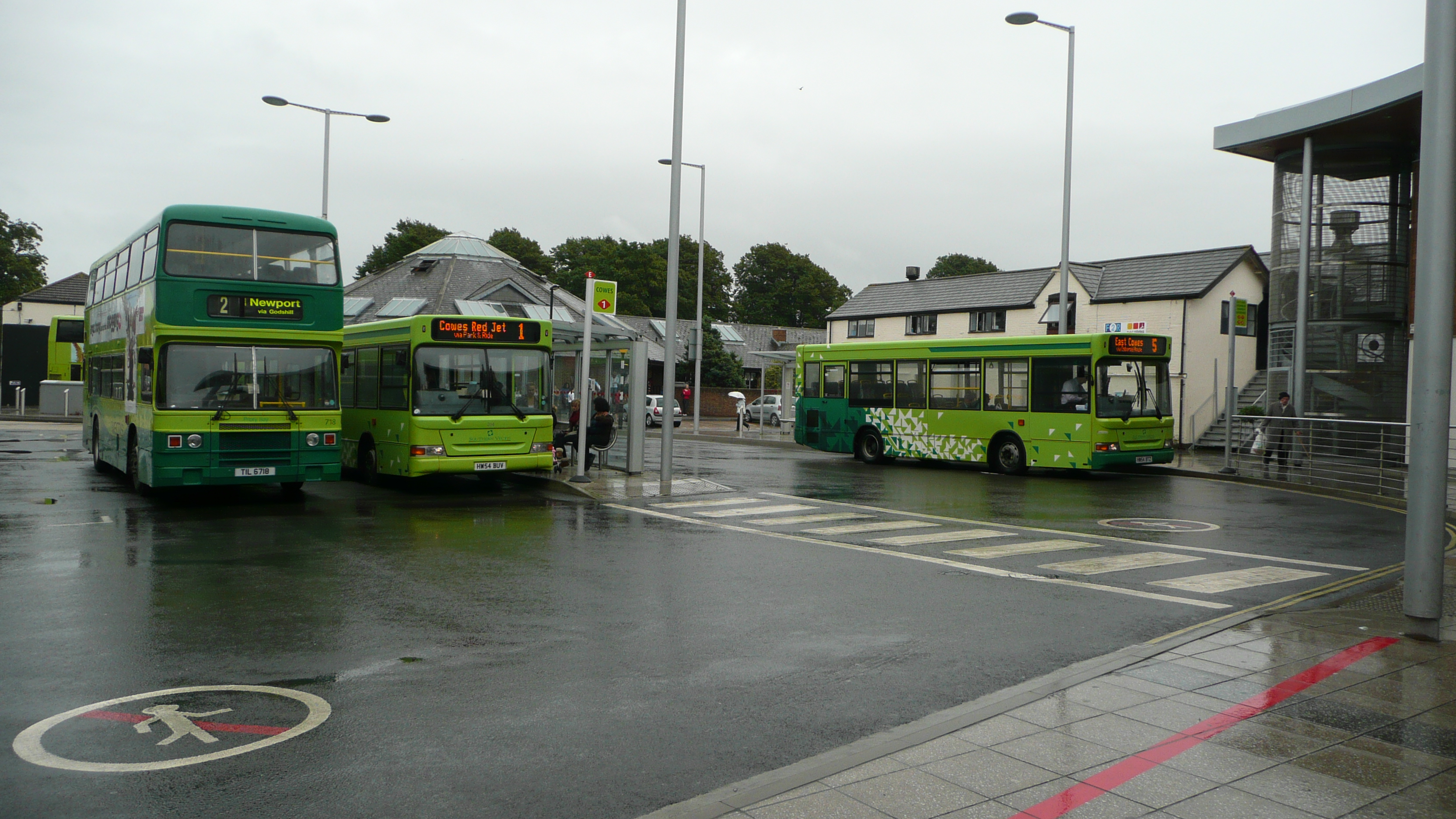

General information
- Location: Newport; Isle of Wight
- Operator: Southern Vectis
- Bus stands: 5
- Bus operators: Southern Vectis
- Connections: No
Location

Newport bus station, on the Isle of Wight is located at Orchard Street in Newport town centre. Recent redevelopment has seen the former 1960s-built South Street bus station demolished, to make way for a new row of shops, and the current facility built behind that site.

From April 2011, the bus station travel office has accommodated a 'Visitor Information' point, to serve as a replacement for the Tourist Information Centres, which were closed by the Isle of Wight Council to save money as a result of funding reductions from central government.

== Overview ==
There is a network of bus lanes through Newport town centre which lead to the bus station, with the aim of speeding a bus's passage into the bus station. They are located on St James' Street and South Street, and go against the direction of flow of these otherwise one-way streets. For the rebuilding of the bus station a temporary bus lane was placed along Church Litten; this was taken out of use and resurfaced to allow regular traffic to use it once the new bus station opened.

== History ==
=== Original buildings ===
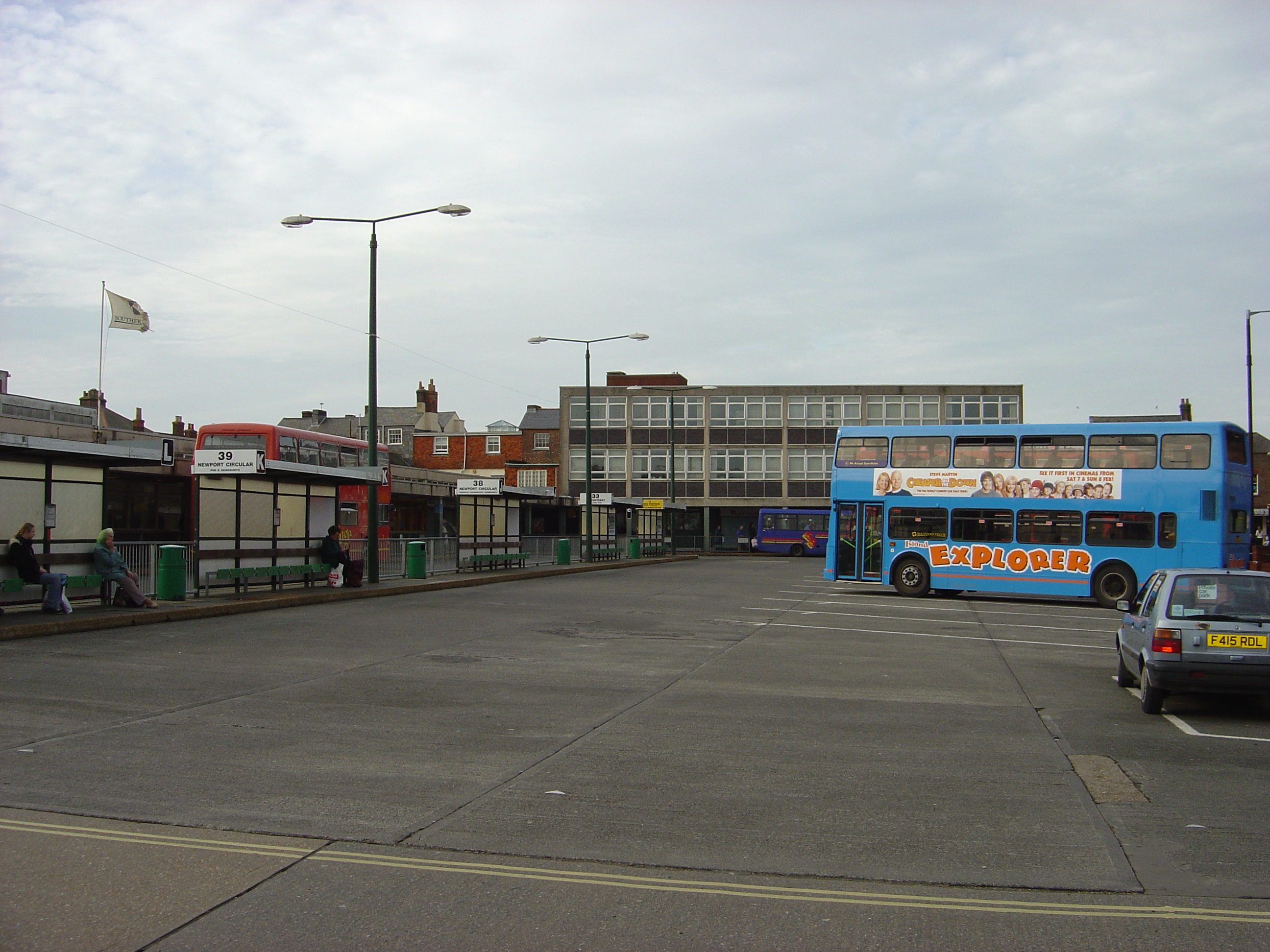
The bus station before 2005 redevelopment.

Newport bus station was built in the 1960s facing South Street where the current shopping centre is located. For buses entering the bus station, they turned straight off South Street, and parked at one of the stands in the bus station. Buses leaving the bus station left at an exit next to Inland Revenue offices on the other side of the bus station. Prior to bus lanes being put in, all buses followed the east to west flow of traffic along this section of South Street. At the front of the bus station was an area for bus parking. Towards the back were stands for Island Explorer and Route Rouge routes. There were other stands in the middle for Newport Town services such as routes 38 and 39. Another stand was located at the back near the Inland Revenue offices, now occupied by a Next store. Shops opened out under these offices onto the bus station, one of which was the Southern Vectis travel office. Stands at the back of the bus station were covered by an overhang, rather than freestanding shelters.

=== Competitors refused access ===
As the bus station was bought along with Southern Vectis in 1986 from the National Bus Company by management, the station is owned and maintained by Southern Vectis. This was subject to controversy from the first week of bus deregulation, as the company refused to allow any of their competitors, Island Travel and Gange's Minicoaches, into the station. These companies were forced to use a bus stop outside the station, which they claimed were obscured by parked double deckers.

Southern Vectis' refusal to allow Gange's Minicoaches to use Newport bus station prompted an investigation in 1987 by the Office of Fair Trading. The first time the deregulated bus industry had come under investigation from the OFT. The OFT report, published in 1988, found Southern Vectis' behaviour to be anti-competitive, preventing smaller bus operators from establishing awareness and competing effectively. Southern Vectis was presented with an ultimatum following the report, either allow competitors to use the bus station, or face the Monopolies and Mergers Commission. The company decided that the former was preferable, and instated a programme by which competitors could use their station. At the time, Southern Vectis' relatively small competitors would have to pay an annual licence fee, insurance, and provide their timetables to Southern Vectis for the next six months, in return for the right to use and post timetables at appropriate stands in the station. The precedent was set, preventing privately owned bus stations from restricting access to competitors.

=== Redevelopment ===
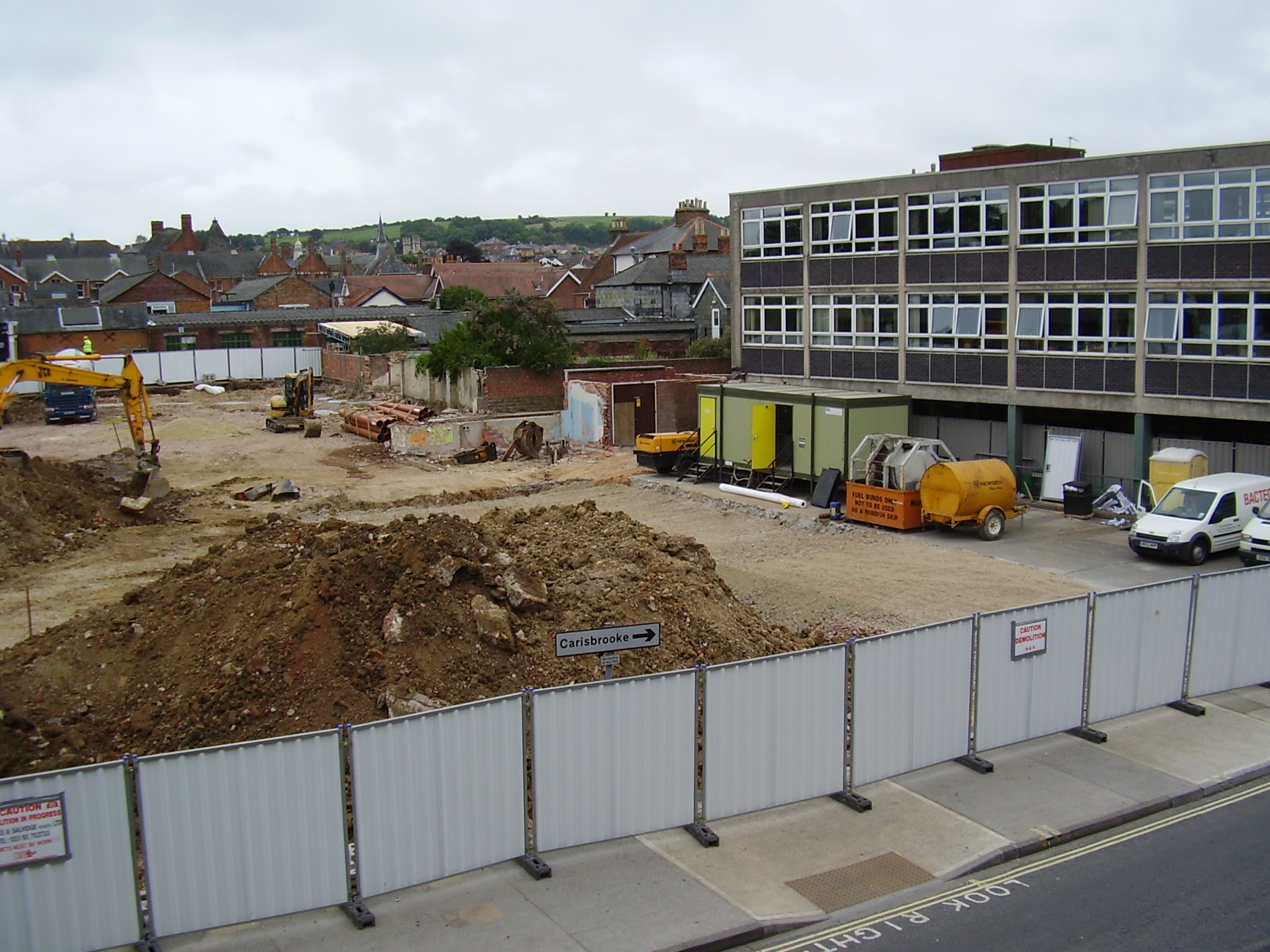
Bus station site under redevelopment in September 2005

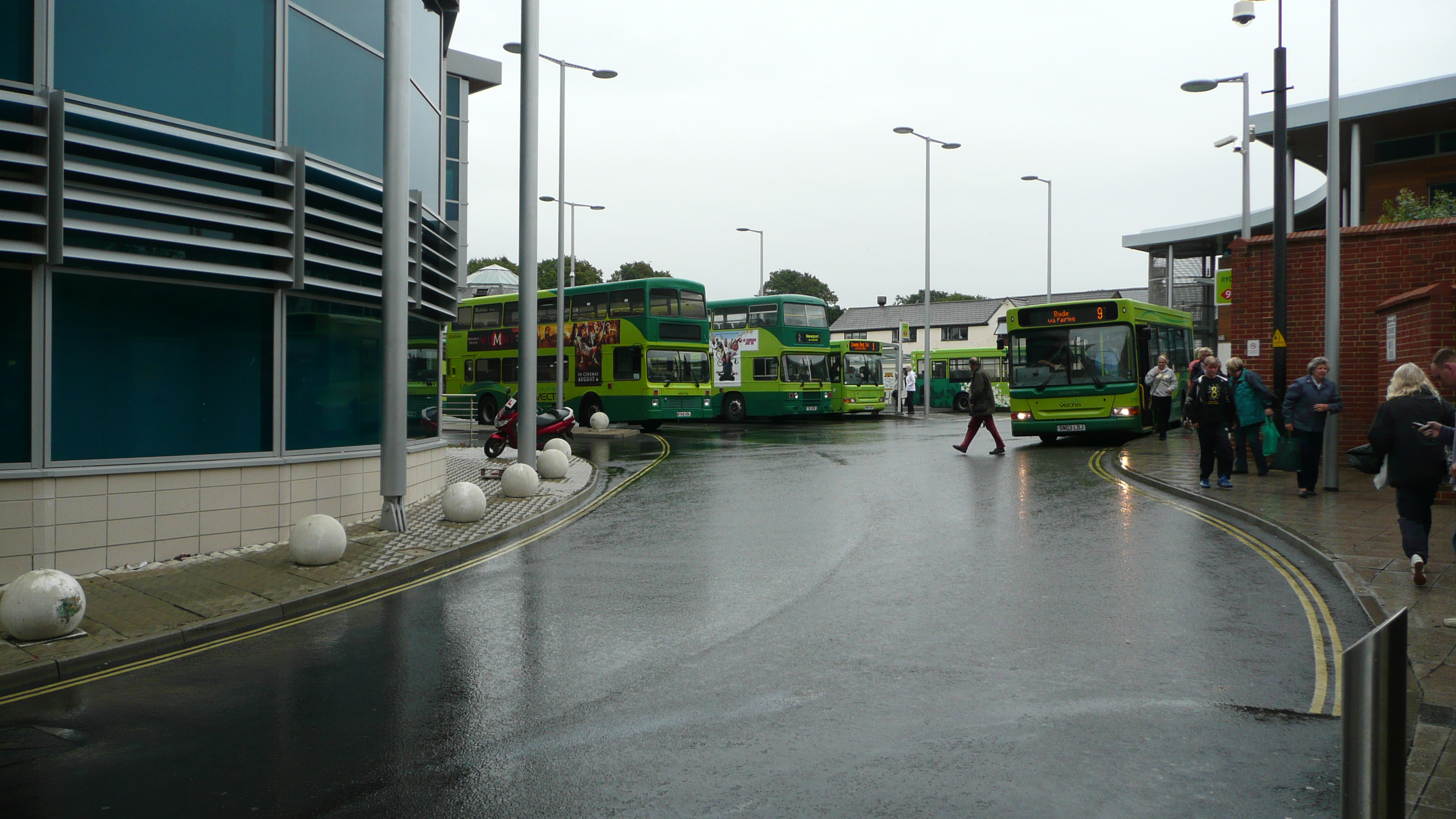
A view taken from Stand A of the bus station, looking towards Stand B

The plans for redevelopment were first revealed in September 2003 for 60,000 square feet (5,600 m^{2}) of retail space to be created on the old bus station site. Plans were finally approved almost a year later in July 2004. The approved plans were slightly different from those originally lodged, with only 50,000 square feet (4,600 m^{2}) of retail space and a reduced number of shops.

Redevelopment started from the old bus station from summer 2005. During this time a temporary bus lane was set up alongside Church Litten with bus shelters erected in South Street Car Park. Buses set down in the bus lane, and stopped to pick up passengers at one of the three bus stands in Church Litten, lettered A, B or C.

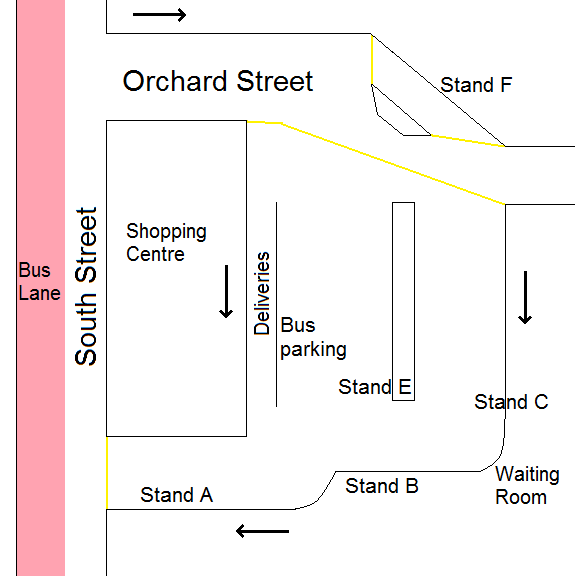
A diagram of the layout of Newport bus station.

In April 2011, following the closure of tourist information centres across the island by the Isle of Wight Council, Southern Vectis agreed to launch a new visitor information service in the main island towns. The waiting room of the bus station was refurbished to accommodate the new services. The new service was aimed at providing a replacement only for the role of providing information on tourist and travel details.
