= Isle of Wight Bus & Coach Museum =

- Established: 1997
- Location: Park Road, Ryde Isle of Wight, PO33 2BE
- Coordinates: 50.726108°N 1.154863°W
- Type: Transport
- Director: Derek Priddle (Chairman), Trevor Whelan, Richard Newman, Keith Randle, Leo Roberts, Ben Bartram, Russ Cluitt, Trevor Wood, Graeme Brazier.
- Website: http://www.iwbusmuseum.org.uk/

The Isle of Wight Bus & Coach Museum, also referred to as The Isle of Wight Bus Museum, was founded in 1997 in Newport on the Isle of Wight in the United Kingdom.

The museum is a registered charity and run completely by volunteers. The vehicle collection is currently housed in the former bus depot at Ryde, Isle of Wight.

The museum hosts two bus rallies of its own. The May Running Day, branded as Rydabus, emphasises local heritage with a selection of operational vintage buses recreating authentic Isle of Wight routes from the 1960s, 1970s, and 1980s. In contrast, the October Wightrider event adopts a broader national perspective, inviting heritage buses from across the United Kingdom to join displays and running services alongside the museum's own collection.

== Vehicles on display ==
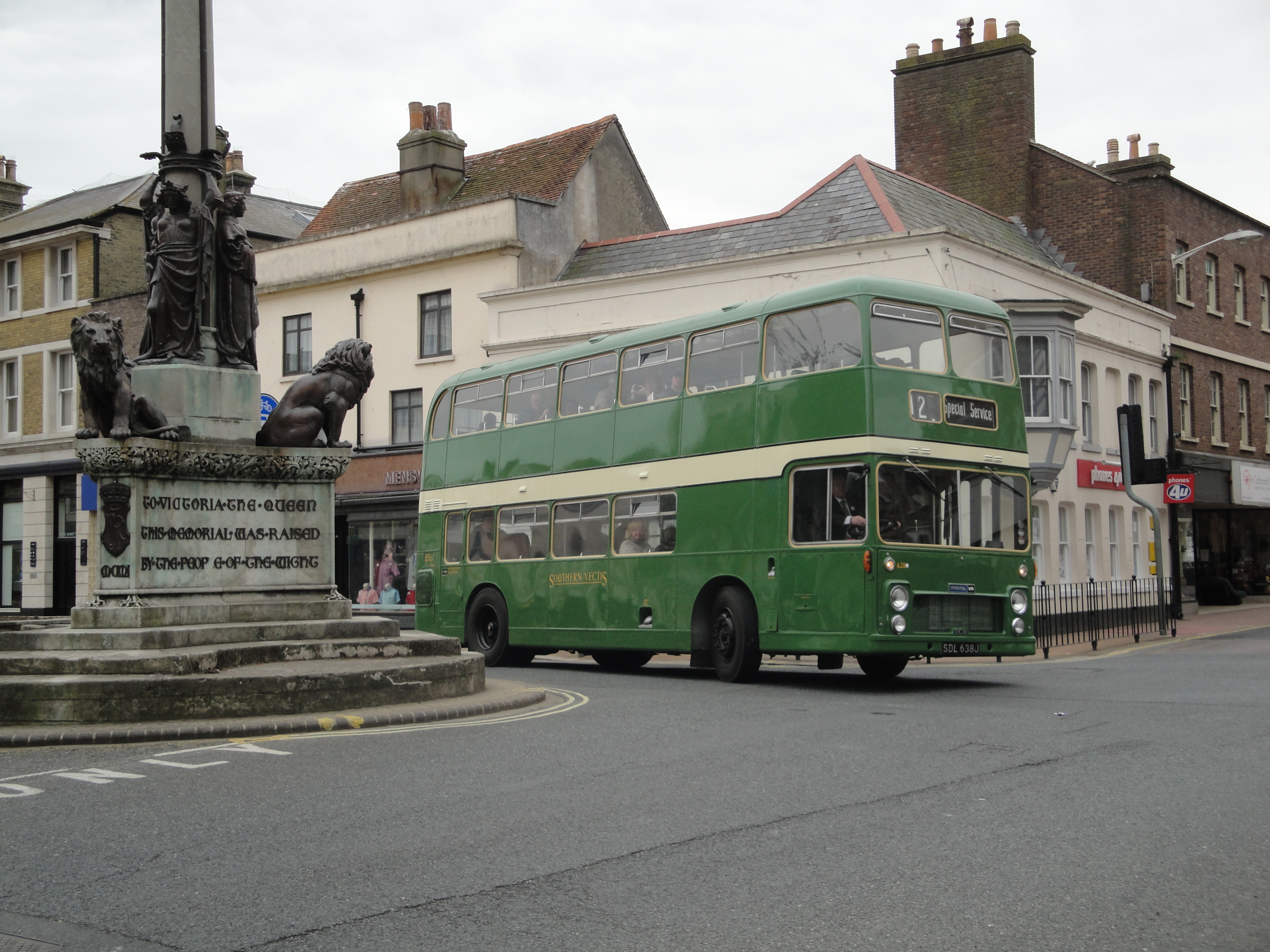
Bristol VR Previously run by Southern Vectis 628 SDL638J St James Square, Newport.

Bus	Registration	Year	Owner
Bristol K5G / ECW	FLJ538	1954	Museum
Bristol K5G	EDL657	1947	Museum
Bristol MW6G / ECW	PDL515	1958	Museum
Bedford SB / Duple	ADL459B	1964	Museum
Bristol FLF6G / ECW	CDL479C	1965	Museum
Bristol MW6G / ECW	FDL927D	1966	Museum
Bristol RESH / Duple Commander	KDL885F	1968	Museum
Bristol RELL / ECW	TDL563K	1971	Museum
Bedford YRQ / Plaxton	VDL264K	1972	Museum
Leyland Leopard / ECW B51	RDL309X	1982	Museum
Dennis Dart / Duple	G526VYE	1990	Museum
Volvo B10B / Northern Counties	K125BUD	1993	Museum
AEC Matador / SVOC	GXX785	1945	Museum
Daimler CK / Dodson	DL5084	1927	Museum
Cheverton Stage Coach		1880	Museum
Merc / Robin Hood	NDL 600W	1982	Museum
Bedford SB / Duple	ODL400		Museum
Leyland National	MDL880R	1976	Museum
Dennis Dart	HW52 EPX	2002	Museum
Ford Transit	B259 MDL	1984	Museum
Bedford OB / Duple	FDL676	1949	On Loan
Bristol LD6G / ECW	PDL519	1958	Museum
Dennis Ace / Harrington	DL9015	1934	Private
Bristol LD6G / ECW	SDL268	1959	Private
Bristol VRT-SL2 / ECW	SDL638J	1971	Private
Bristol LD/ ECW	MDL 954		Private
Leyland Olympian / ECW	A700DDL		Museum
Bristol RESL / ECW	HDL 23E		Museum

The Isle of Wight Bus Museum currently has 21 vehicles on display at its new premises at Ryde.

== Relocation ==
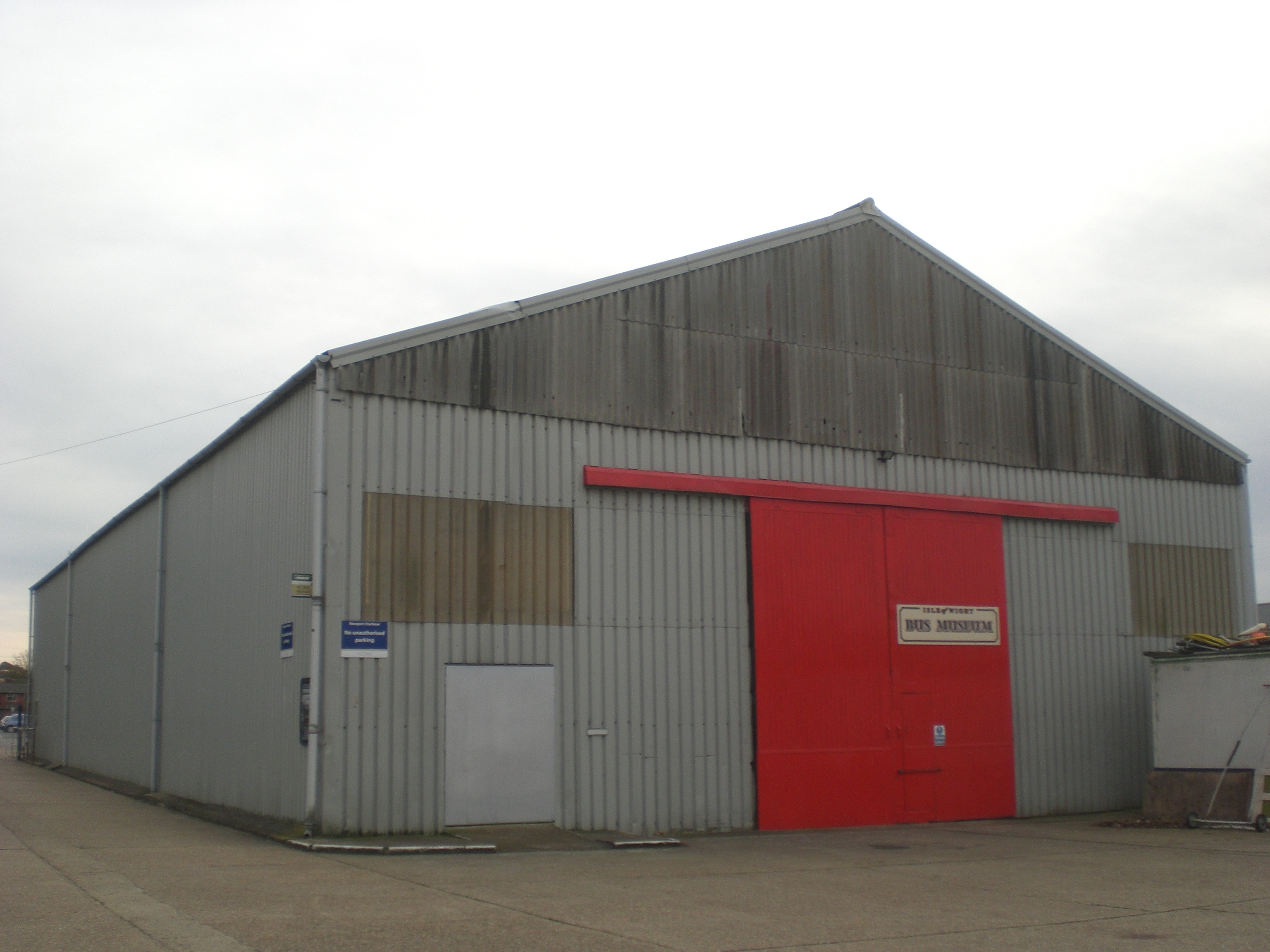
The bus museum's previous site at Newport Quay

By the end of 2010, the museum was planning to relocate and construct a new purpose-built unit to house an Island Road Transport Museum. The move was necessary due to the building it used being demolished as part of redevelopment of Newport Quay. The plan was to purchase a two and a half acre area of farmland adjoining Havenstreet Railway, with the new site covering twice the floor area that the previous base offered. The plans would require £120,000 to be raised to fund the move. Supporters were invited to purchase £250 shares in the project with monies being returned if the plan failed. However, in addition to funding issues, the field formed part of the Isle of Wight AONB, which could have led to a battle for planning consent over redevelopment.

Since 2015 the museum has been based at a former Southern Vectis depot, located in Park Road, Ryde, Isle of Wight. which houses and displays the museum's collection of buses and coaches.

== Photo gallery ==
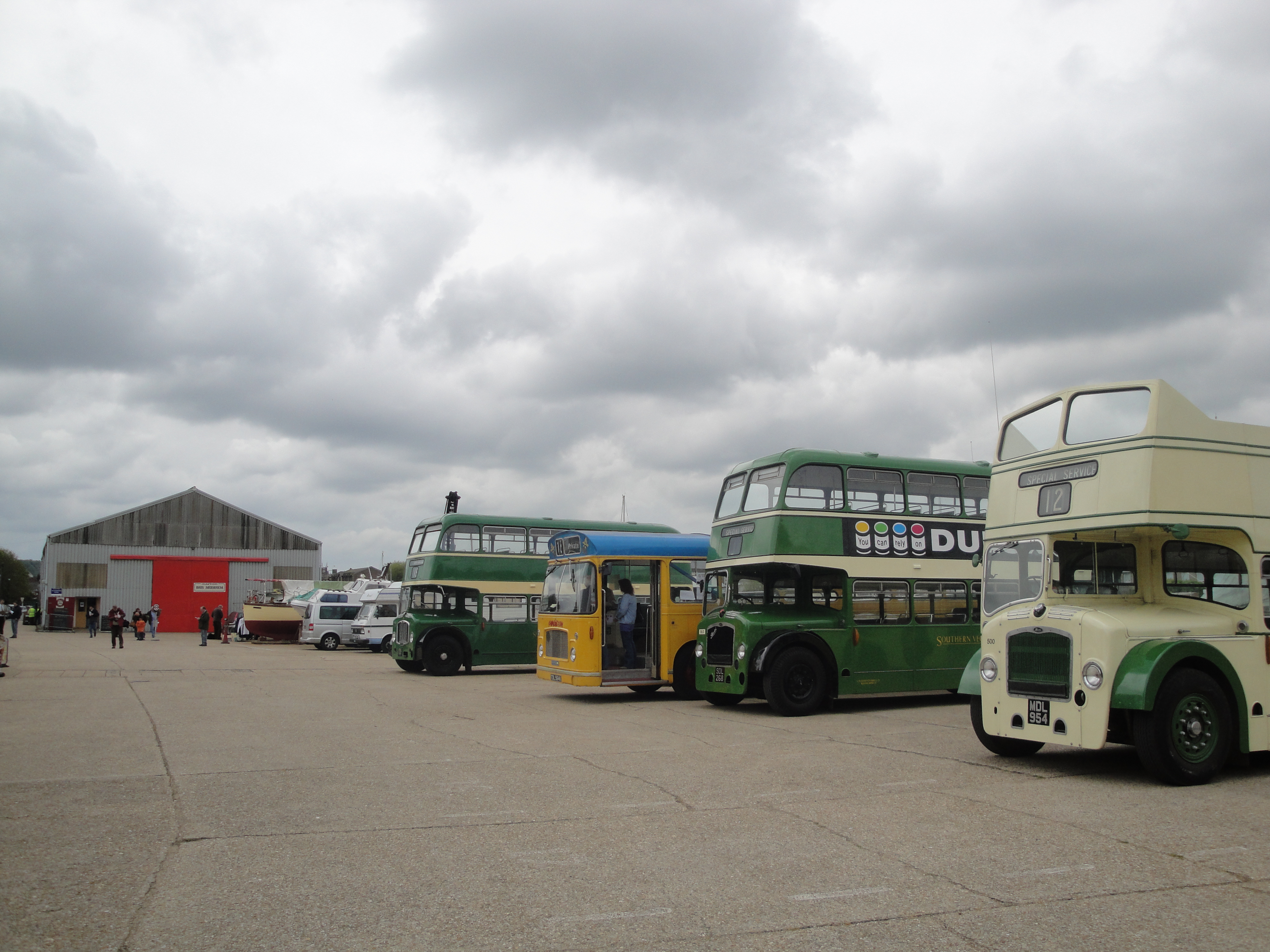
Buses lined up on the quay during the "Ex Island Buses" only running day during May 2010.

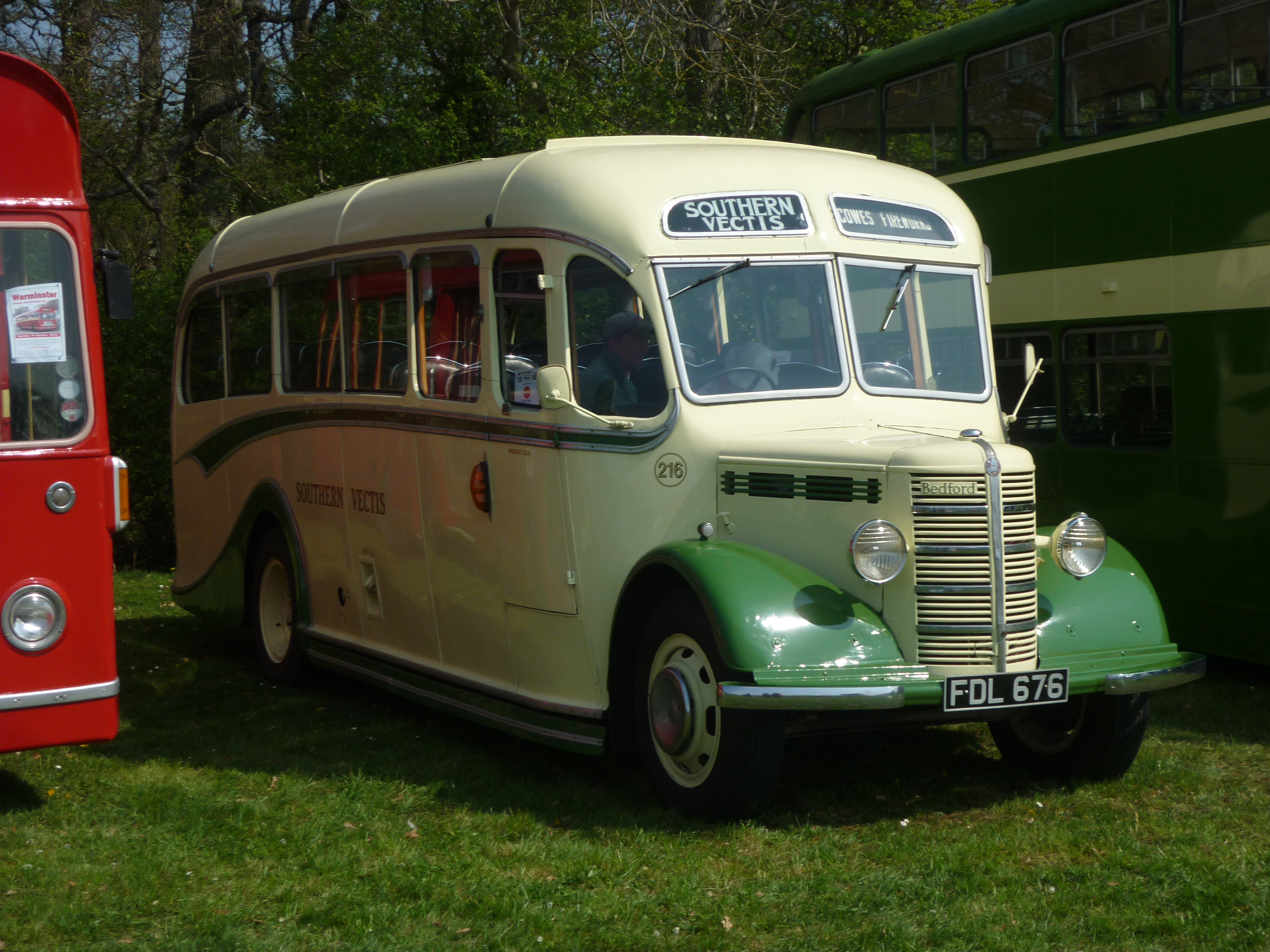
An ex Southern Vectis Bedford OB 216 (FDL676) at the Southern Vectis Bustival 2011. This bus is part of the bus museum collection.

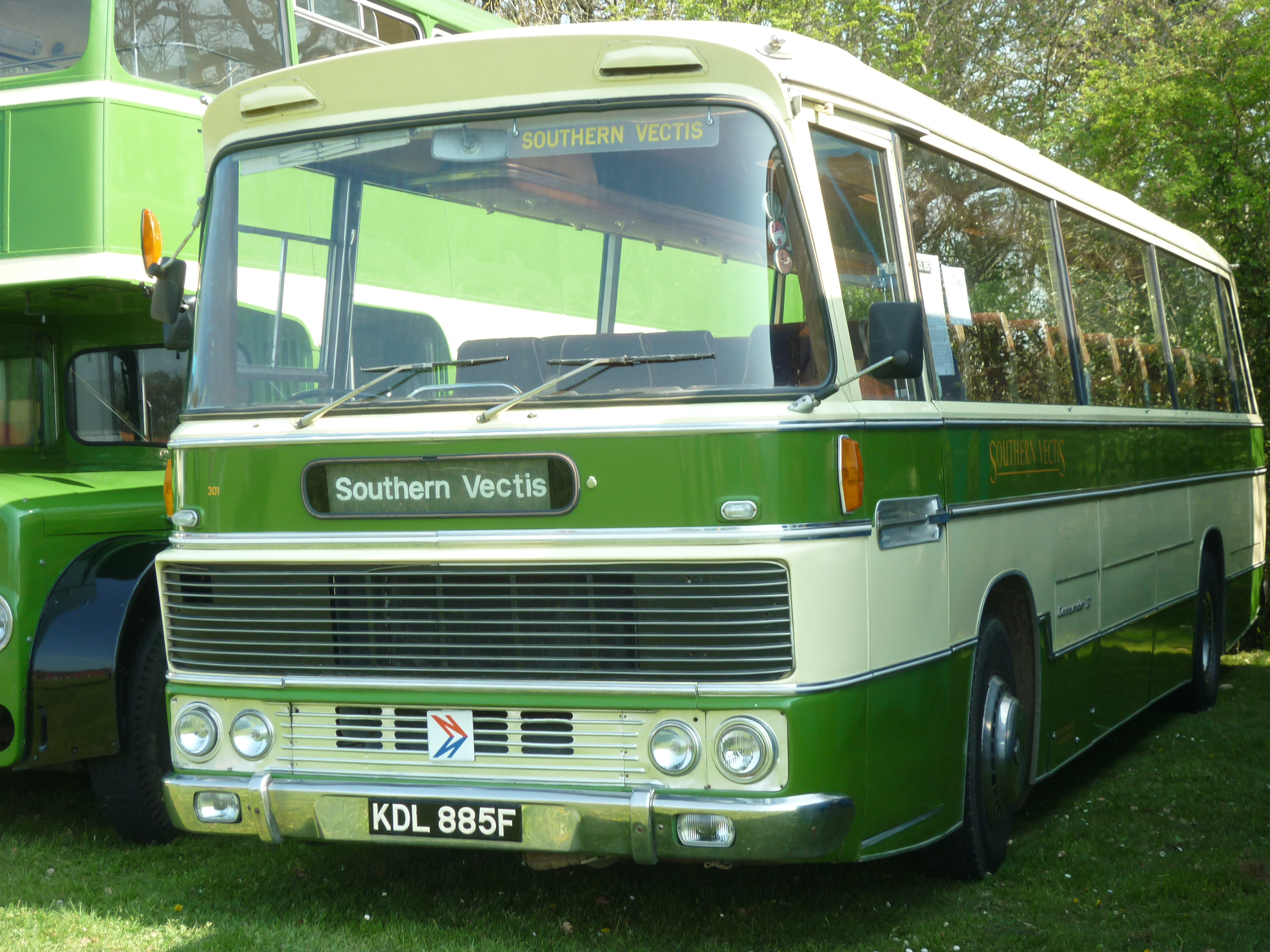
This is 301 a Bristol RELH with Duple Commander Bodywork.This bus is part of the bus museum collection.
