= List of civil parishes on the Isle of Wight =

This is a list of civil parishes in the ceremonial county of Isle of Wight, England. There are 33 civil parishes. The whole of the island is parished.

== Isle of Wight ==
The whole of the county is parished.

Civil Parish	Area (km^{2})	Population (2011 Census)	Population (2021 Census)	Density (km^{2})	Population change (2011-2021)	Photo
Arreton ^{2}	19.35	988	1,037	53.59	+0.49%	
Bembridge ^{2}	9.12	3,688	3,561	390.4	-0.35%	
Brading (town) ^{2}	14.27	2,034	2,167	151.8	+0.64%	
Brighstone ^{2}	19.59	1,603	1,584	80.86	-0.12%	
Calbourne, Newtown and Porchfield ^{2}	31.23	886	819	26.22	-0.78%	
Chale ^{2}	8.89	639	620	69.71	-0.3%	
Chillerton and Gatcombe ^{2}	11.2464	422	426	37.85	+0.09%	
Cowes (town) ^{1}	2.8	10,405	10,450	3,725	+0.04%	
East Cowes (town) ^{1}	5.09	7,314	8,428	1,655	+1.4%	
Fishbourne ^{4}	2.18	754	738	377.4	-0.21%	
Freshwater ^{2}	14.49	5,369	5,646	389.7	+0.51%	
Godshill ^{2}	19.81	1,459	1,486	75.02	+0.18%	
Gurnard ^{1}	4.08	1,682	2,088	510.7	+2.88%	
Havenstreet and Ashey ^{3} ^{4}	12.28	737	759	61.82	+0.3%	
Lake ^{5}	2.43	5,117	4,980	2,044	-0.27%	
Nettlestone and Seaview ^{4}	5.4	2,549	2,522	466.4	-0.11%	
Newchurch ^{2}	16.03	2,622	2,635	164.3	+0.05%	
Newport and Carisbrooke ^{3}	54.48	25,496	26,376	484.2	+0.34%	
Niton and Whitwell ^{2}	12.92	2,082	2,154	166.7	+0.34	
Northwood ^{1}	5.56	2,311	2,279	409.2	-0.14%	
Rookley ^{2}	3.83	638	607	158.4	-0.5%	
Ryde (town) ^{4}	10.1080	23,999	24,096	2,365	+0.04%	
Sandown (town) ^{5}	4.26	7,185	7,125	1,671	-0.08%	
Shalfleet ^{2}	20.29	1,546	1,627	80.18	+0.51%	
Shanklin (town) ^{5}	7.7	9,072	9,123	1,184	+0.06%	
Shorwell ^{2}	19.33	670	690	35.7	+0.3%	
St Helens ^{4}	1.9	1,213	1,242	653.8	+0.24%	
Totland ^{2}	5.35	2,927	2,960	552.4	+0.11%	
Ventnor (town) ^{6}	8.22	5,976	5,567	677.2	-0.71%	
Whippingham ^{1}	6.21	787	850	136.7	+0.77%	
Wootton Bridge ^{3}	6.98	3,477	3,389	485.5	-0.26%	
Wroxall ^{6}	7.53	1,753	1,709	226.8	-0.25%	
Yarmouth (town) ^{2}	6.76	865	726	107.3	-1.7%	
Isle of Wight	380.2	138,265	140,459	369.5	+0.16%	

- Data Source: Office of National Statistics: QS102EW - Population density

== Notes ==
1. Formerly Cowes Urban District
2. Formerly Isle of Wight Rural District
3. Formerly Newport Municipal Borough, also formerly Newport Parish Council.
4. Formerly Ryde Municipal Borough
5. Formerly Sandown-Shanklin Urban District
6. Formerly Ventnor Urban District

== See also ==
- List of civil parishes in England
- List of places on the Isle of Wight
