= List of Isle of Wight bands =

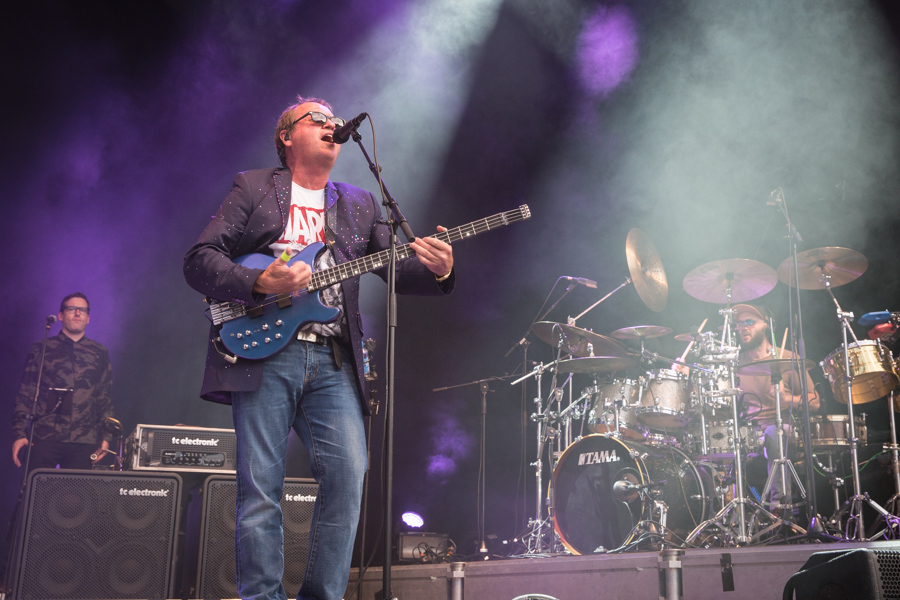
Level 42 at Kongsberg Jazz Festival 2017

This is a list of bands and musicians from the Isle of Wight, as well notable music venues and festival on the Island.

== Bands ==
- Level 42
- The Bees (a.k.a. A Band of Bees)
- Get Shakes
- Champs
- The Operators
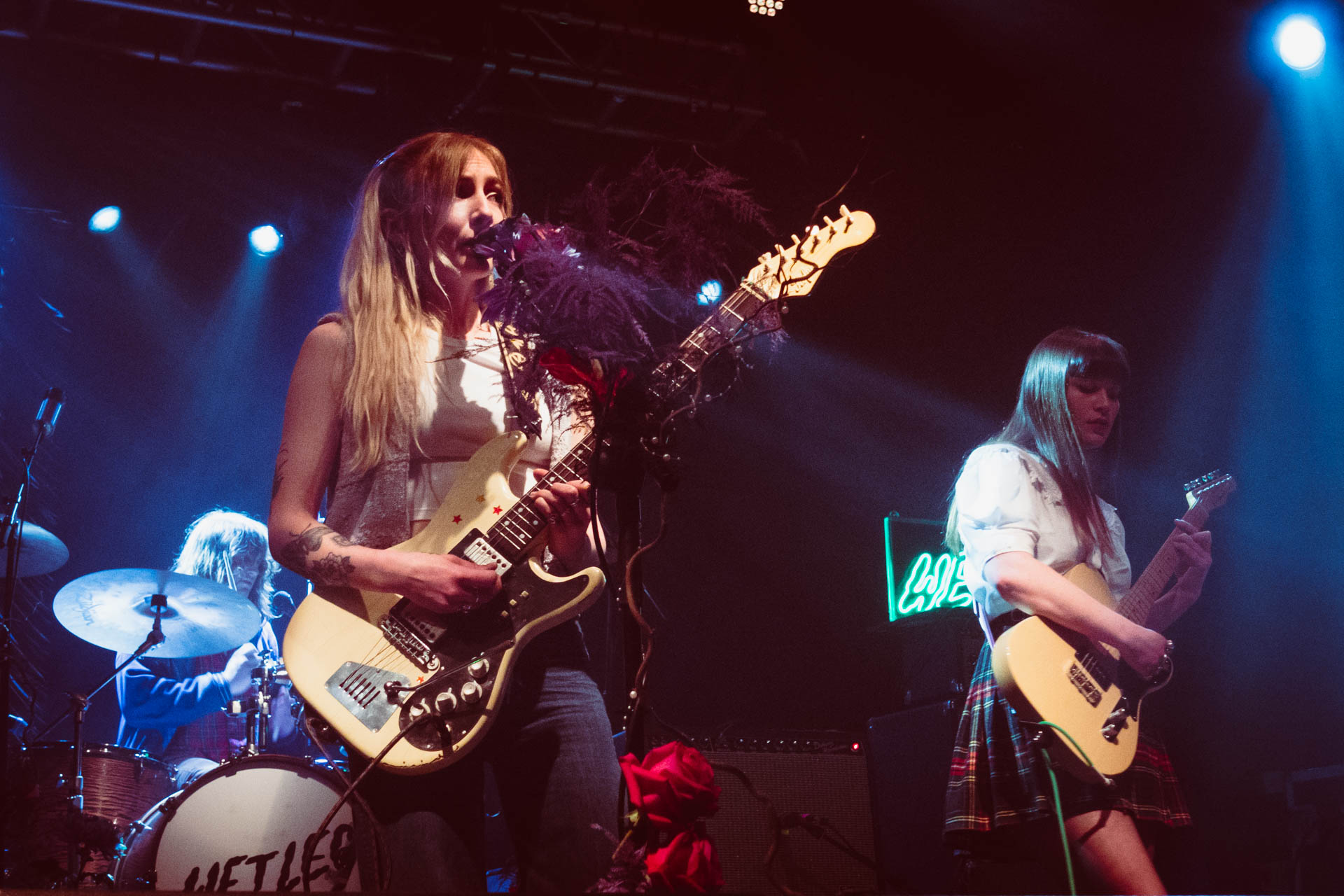
- Wet Leg
  Grade 2
- Wet Leg
- Coach Party
- The Pill
- Plastic Mermaids
- Five Degrees North
- The Optimists
- ugly ozo

== Musicians ==
- Mark King, Level 42, Re-Flex
- Jet Harris, former member of the Shadows, died 2011
- Antony Harding, drummer of Hefner
- Andy Booth, drummer of Go:Audio
- Jon Thorne, session bassist, played for Lamb (band), Jools Holland, Robert Miles, Love Amongst Ruin and Robert Fripp
- Stu Fisher, studio engineer and session drummer, performed with Hole (band), Ozric Tentacles and Courtney Love
- Sarah Close, singer-songwriter and YouTuber
- Dick Taylor, guitarist for the Pretty Things and early bassist for the Rolling Stones
- Lee Downer, singer and guitarist for the Defiled
- Razzle (Nicholas Dingley) Drummer for Hanoi Rocks
- Fugo Kid, stage name of rapper Jack Portuito
- Snowy White guitarist in Thin Lizzy 1980 to 1982
- David Steele, Fine Young Cannibals
- Lauran Hibberd, also known as Favourite Daughter
- Stormtrooper, 1970s punk band, reunited in 2025
- Rhian Teasdale, singer and guitarist with Wet Leg
- Peter Banks, member of After the Fire

== Isle of Wight music scene in national media ==
In August 2022, NME reviewed Lauran Hibberd's album Garageband Superstar, giving it 3 stars.

In October 2022, Plastic Mermaids were featured in The Guardian as One to Watch. Journalist Damien Morris said the group produce "playfully ambitious songs that wander from bouncy pop and orchestral psych to indie folk and electro."

In February 2023, pianist Jay Eatwell featured on Channel 4 show The Piano. Eatwell was praised by judges Lang Lang and Mika and performed at the Royal Festival Hall.

In January 2026, BBC Radio 6 Music DJs Steve Lamacq and Huw Stephens broadcast live from local venue Strings Bar and Venue as part of Independent Venue Week. The show featured music by local artists including Coach Party, Paul Armfield, Five Degrees North, Wet Leg, The Bees, Level 42 and The Pill.

== Isle of Wight music festivals ==
=== Current Festivals ===
- Isle of Wight Festival, (1968-70, 2002-present). Takes place in June at Seaclose Park, Newport. The festival has hosted acts including Jimi Hendrix, David Bowie, Amy Winehouse, Paul McCartney, The Who, Tom Petty & The Heartbreakers, Bruce Springsteen and the E Street Band, Red Hot Chili Peppers, Florence and the Machine, Jay-Z and Neil Young.

=== Past Festivals ===
- Bestival (2004-18), moved to Dorset in 2017. Organised by DJ and record producer Rob da Bank, headliners included The Cure, Duran Duran, Outkast, Snoop Dogg, Elton John, Stevie Wonder, The Prodigy, Massive Attack and MGMT.
- Rhythmtree Festival (2009-22), formerly DidgHead Radio Festival. Headliners included Ginger Baker's Jazz Confusion, Kid Creole and the Coconuts, Skinny Lister, Stereo MC's, Morcheeba, Saving Grace feat. Suzi Dian And Robert Plant, The Zombies, The Wailers and The Fatback Band. In 2023, organisers announced the festival was postponed, with the Sundown Sessions replacing the main event that year. The festival then never returned.
- The Great Wonderfest (2019). Held at Duxmore Farm, the festival was hosted by TV duo Dick and Dom and was headlined by The Vamps, Busted, Conor Maynard and Becky Hill, Musical Youth and The Blow Monkeys. The 2020 event announced Ella Eyre, Faithless, HRVY, Terry Hall and Lauran Hibberd but was cancelled by organisers.

== Isle of Wight music venues ==
- Strings Bar and Venue (Newport), a 300-capacity venue set up in 2017. Has hosted performances from Buzzcocks, Tom Meighan, Lauran Hibberd, Six60, British Lion featuring Iron Maiden's Steve Harris, and Porridge Radio. In August 2026, Strings organised concerts held Robin Hill Adventure Park, which has a larger capacity. The lineup included Scouting For Girls, Sigma, Tom Meighan, Echobelly, 5 Degrees North, Fugo Kid and Ruby.
- Quay Arts (Newport), the Island's leading art gallery and venue for live arts events, situated in a converted 19th-Century brewery warehouse. Has hosted Glen Matlock, Peggy Seeger, Martyn Joseph, Peter Knight's Gigspanner.
- Freshwater Memorial Hall (Freshwater), a former Drill Hall which is run as a charitable not-for-profit establishment. Has hosted Martin Carthy, Catrin Finch & Seckou Keita, Martin Simpson and Robyn Hitchcock, as well as non-music events such as a recording of the BBC Radio 4 show Any Questions.
