= Trixie's Big Red Motorbike =

British indie pop band

- Trixie's Big Red Motorbike performing in Osaka, Japan, July 2012.

Background information
- Origin: Isle of Wight, United Kingdom
- Genres: Indie pop, twee pop
- Years active: 1981–1985, 2012
- Labels: Chew; Nathan; Lobby Lud; C-Side; In Der Tat; Accident
- Past members: Jane Litten (vocals, keyboards, recorder); Mark Litten (programming, guitar, backing vocals, bass, drums); Ai Matsuda (backing vocals, percussion); Melanie Litten (vocals, percussion, recorder)
- Website: trixiesbigredmotorbike.weebly.com

Trixie's Big Red Motorbike was an indie pop band formed on the Isle of Wight, United Kingdom, in 1981. They released two singles, one EP and one flexi disc. A vinyl compilation album of their music called The Intimate Sound of Trixie’s Big Red Motorbike was released by Accident Records in 1995. A retrospective album called All Day Long in Bliss was released on Lobby Lud Records in February of 2012. They reformed that same year.

== Formation and early recordings ==
In 1981 telephone technician Mark Litten and his sixth-former sister Melanie began performing cover versions of songs by The Undertones and Marine Girls. At this time they were known as 'Pocket Money'. These early recordings are now lost. Their first original song was "Invisible Boyfriend", and this became their first single under the name Trixie's Big Red Motorbike. This was recorded at "Trixieland"-a box-room in their house on the Isle of Wight. Only 100 copies were pressed, and the record came with photocopied sleeves and no labels.

A copy of the single was sent to BBC Radio 1 DJ John Peel, who played it on his show and invited the band to record a session. On 28 July 1982 they recorded four songs, and these were broadcast on 24 August.

Their second record was the EP Five Songs, recorded in Portsmouth. 500 copies were pressed, and this also came with photocopied sleeves.

== Jane Fox ==
By this time TBRM had become friendly with Jane Fox of Marine Girls, and she was invited to join them for their second John Peel session, recorded 17 August 1983. She also joined them for a recording session at Rod Gammons Sound Studio on the Isle of Wight. At this session three songs were recorded: "That's the End of That", which was released as a 7" flexidisc, "Norman and Narcissus" and "In Timbuktu". Their next single release was "Norman and Narcissus" (Lobby Lud Records). This was the band's first and only entry in the UK Indie Chart, peaking at number 29.

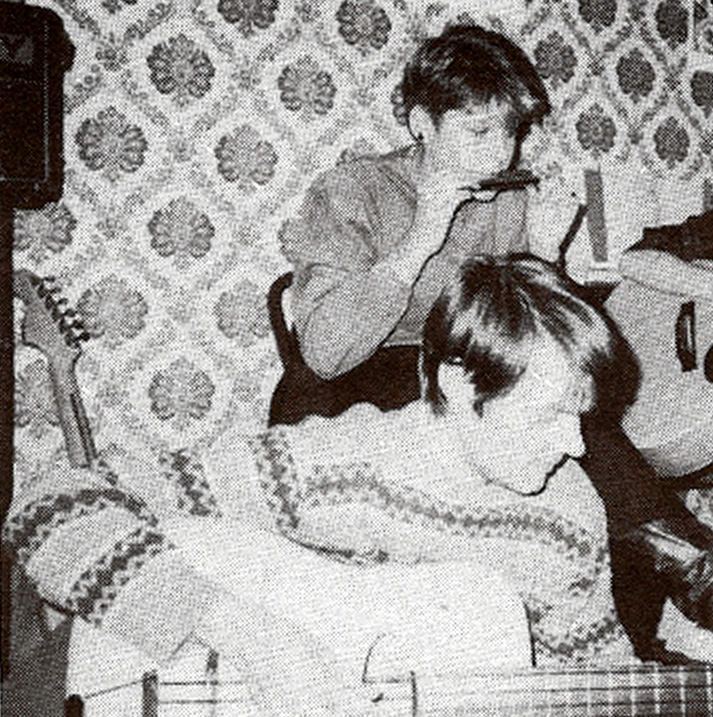
TBRM rehearsing, 1983

== Later work ==
In 1984 a compilation album of Isle of Wight bands was released. TBRM contributed two tracks: "When He's by my Side" and "Fairytales". These were the last studio recordings by the band. In 1986 a compilation cassette of various indie bands was released by In Der Tat, a German record company. TBRM contributed two tracks: "That's Quite a Lot" and "I'm Gonna Ride Away", both recorded at Trixieland. Around this time Melanie moved off of the Isle of Wight, and TBRM disbanded. Mark contributed one song "Once I've Seen Him", and played guitars on an EP by Sarah Goes Shopping, a band formed by Twa Toots leader Sarah Brown. The TBRM song "That's the End of That" was covered by the New York band The Poconos.

Mark Litten died on 21 September 2015.

== Trixieland ==
Trixieland was a 7'x7'x7' box-room in the Littens' house in Shanklin, Isle of Wight. It was used for recording TBRM's first single and demos. It was also Mark's bedroom.

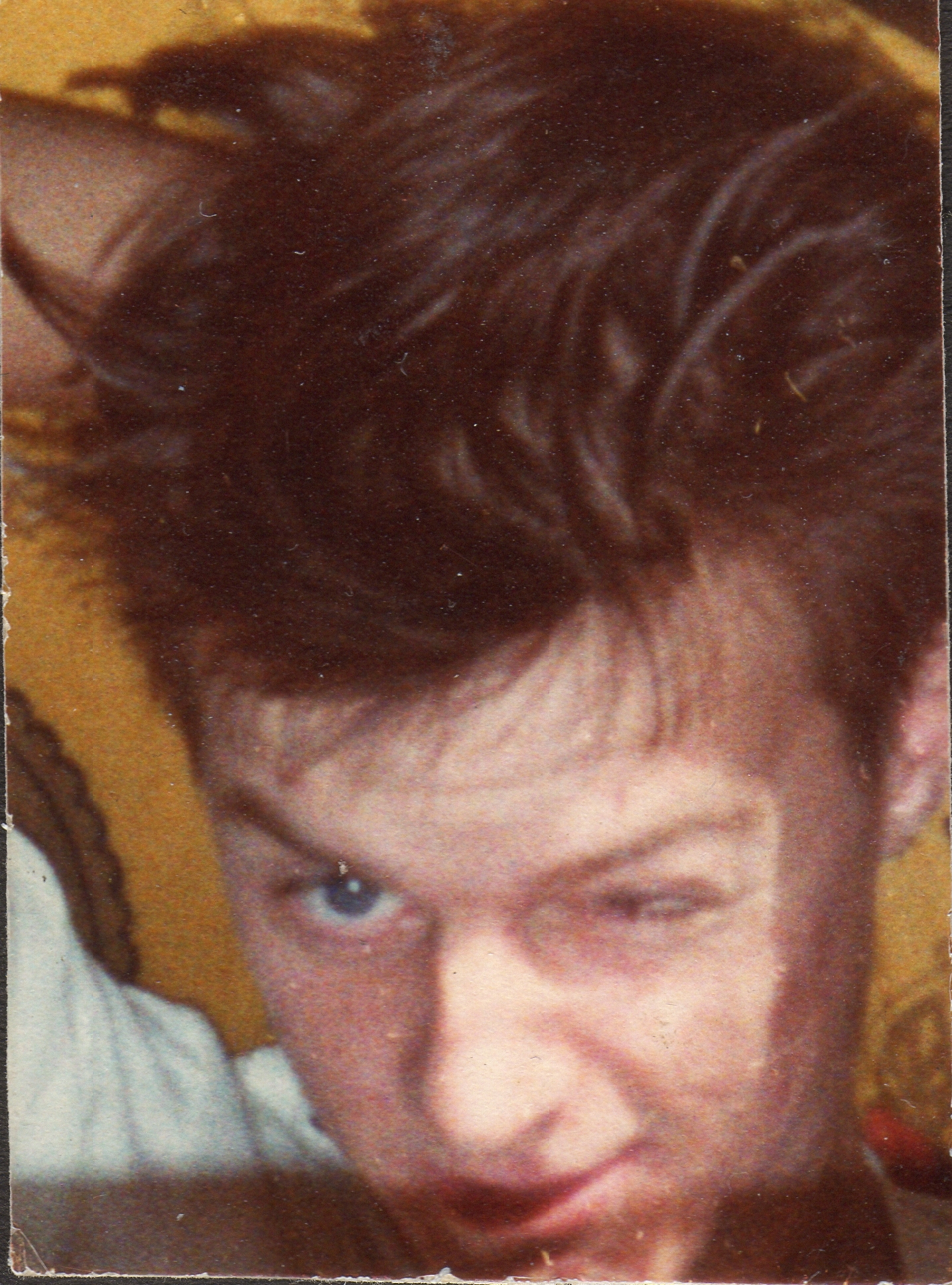
Mark Litten at Trixieland, 1982

Recording equipment consisted of a TEAC 1/4" reel to reel tape recorder and an Aiwa tape to tape cassette recorder. There were no mixing facilities. The microphone stands were handmade from broom handles. Most tracks were created by first recording the drum machine, guitar and vocal together, then adding instruments one by one; bouncing between the two machines. The instruments were very inexpensive: a simple drum machine, a Westbury electric guitar, a non-Fender precision bass, and various percussion instruments. The sound resulting from this set-up was variable in quality, and should probably be described as lo-fi.

== Interviews and reviews ==
In 1982 TBRM were interviewed by BBC producer John Walters in Shanklin. Writing in Honey he said "Melanie sings as if doing her fingernails at the same time", and called them "talented". They were interviewed by Alvin Smith for the St Albans fanzine "Wally's Dog" in summer 1983. Their flexidisc was issued with this fanzine.

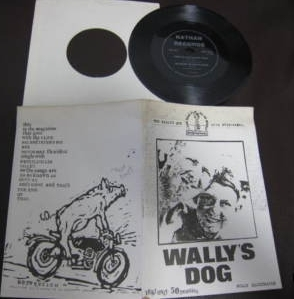
"Wally's Dog" fanzine.

In "Caught in Flux" magazine Mike Appelstein wrote that TBRMs songs were "among the sweetest, breeziest songs I've ever heard, complete with minimal instrumentation, thin/understated vocals, and melodies to die for."

In Plan B magazine in 2008 the influential British music critic Everett True described the band as "so twee they were beyond twee".

== Career ==
TBRM signed a publishing deal with Twist and Shout Music, and received enquiries from several independent record companies. However, they never had a recording contract, a manager or an agent. A combination of shyness, lack of business acumen, and a determination to stick to the DIY punk ethos of the time caused them to miss opportunities again and again. Physical isolation from the centres of the music industry was also a problem. Their first two records were sold by mail order, and in the pre-internet early 1980s, most of their contact with the outside world was by post.

== Guest members ==
1981–1982	Jim Bycroft (tenor saxophone, keyboards); Kevin Sparrow (handclaps)
1983–1985	Jane Fox (vocals, celesta); Nathan Thomas (speech, sneezing)

== Discography ==
=== Vinyl ===
Title and Track list	Release date	Label	Catalogue number
"Invisible Boyfriend" / "A Splash of Red"	1982	Chew Records	CH 9271
Five Songs EP: "Hold Me", "Whatever Happened to the Treetops?", "You Took Him Away From Me", "Trixie's Groove", "One Nation Under a Brolly"	1983	–	RAM 510
"That's the End of That": "That's the End of That", "As Soon as She's Gone" (by Clive Pig and Lee Valley)	1984	Nathan Records	NAT 001
"Norman and Narcissus" / "In Timbuktu" (#29 UK Indie)	1983	Lobby Lud Records	L100001
Feet on the Street: "When He's by My Side", "Fairytales" plus twelve tracks by other Isle of Wight artists.	1984	C-Side Records	C-SIDE 1
The Intimate Sound of Trixie's Big Red Motorbike: "Trixie's Big Red Motorbike", "Invisible Boyfriend", "A Splash of Red", "Hold Me", "Trixie's Groove", "One Nation Under A Brolly", "Whatever Happened to the Treetops?", You Took Him Away from Me", "That's the End of That", "Norman and Narcissus", "In Timbuktu", "When He's by My Side", "Fairytales", "Hold Me (Hands on mix)", "One Nation Under a Brolly (Long version)", "One Nation Under a Brolly (Longer version)", "You Took Him Away from Me (Tea-time mix)", "That's the End of That (Wight noise mix)", Norman and Narcissus (Shanklin version)", "I'm in Love with You (Norton version)".	1995	Accident Records	DENT 1

=== Cassettes ===
Title and Track list	Release date	Label	Catalogue number
Adventures in Trixieland: "Fairytales", "I'm in Love with You", "Hold Me", "One Nation Under a Brolley", "That's the End of That", "Michael and Mandy", "Just a Minute", "Invisible Boyfriend", "Whatever Happened to the Treetops?", "You Took Him Away From Me", "A Splash of Red", "That's the End of That", "One Nation Under a Brolley", "Norman and Narcissus", "In Timbuktu".	1984	Lobby Lud Records	LC100004
Reynard the Fox: "That's Quite a Lot", "I'm Gonna Ride Away" plus twenty-one tracks by various other indie bands.	1986	In Der Tat	tat 18

=== CDs ===
Title and Track list	Release date	Label	Catalogue number
The Post-Punk Singles Volume 7: "Hold Me", "One Nation Under a Brolley", "You Took Him Away From Me", "Whatever Happened to the Treetops?", "Trixie's Groove" plus twenty tracks by other Post-Punk bands.	2000	–	07NW0109
