= Michal Morey =

Michal Morey was a woodcutter who lived at Sullens, near Downend on the Isle of Wight. He was executed in Winchester and gibbeted on the Isle of Wight in 1737 for the murder of his orphaned grandson, James Dove, who was in the care of Morey and his wife Beth. It is said that, in order to destroy evidence of Dove's murder, he burnt his cottage. The road is now known as "Burnthouse Lane" and the woods as "Burnthouse Woods".

== Death of James Dove ==
James Dove, aged 14, went missing shortly after coming into a small legacy and was last seen going to the woods with his grandfather. Michal Morey absconded for several days and a warrant was issued for his arrest. He was apprehended towards the end of July 1736 and held in Winchester awaiting trial.

Three months later, the dismembered and decomposed remains of James Dove were found in the woods. They were in two leather bags, together with a billhook and bloodied gloves. Identification was made from the victim's clothes.

== Trial and execution ==
Morey was tried at Winchester Assize in March 1737. The evidence was circumstantial. Morey, being inarticulate and taciturn by nature, pleaded not guilty and presented a poor defence. He was sentenced to death and hanged an hour after the trial at Winchester public gallows. His body was then taken to the scene of his crime and hung in chains from a gibbet erected in his home parish of Arreton.

The gibbet was built at a cost of six pounds and five shillings by local wheelwright, John Phillips. It was positioned on a Bronze Age barrow (since known as Michal Morey's Hump) near a crossroads on Gallows Hill at the end of Burnthouse Lane.

== Legacy ==
The gibbet-post now forms a prominent roof beam, over 22 feet in length, in the original tap room of the nearby Hare and Hounds tavern, with the date 1737 carved on it. Beneath, in a glass box, is exhibited a skull said to have been unearthed in 1933 and formerly supposed to be that of Morey. Research has subsequently identified it as belonging to a Bronze Age woman who died in her late teens, as stated on an accompanying notice.

The following rhyme was popular with local children for many years and is displayed, along with contemporary accounts painted in black letters, at intervals around the Hare And Hounds.

Michal Morey is dead
For chopping off his grandson's head
He is hung on Arreton Down
For rooks and ravens to peck down

== See also ==
- History of the Isle of Wight
