= Isle of Wight =

County and island of England

- Ceremonial county
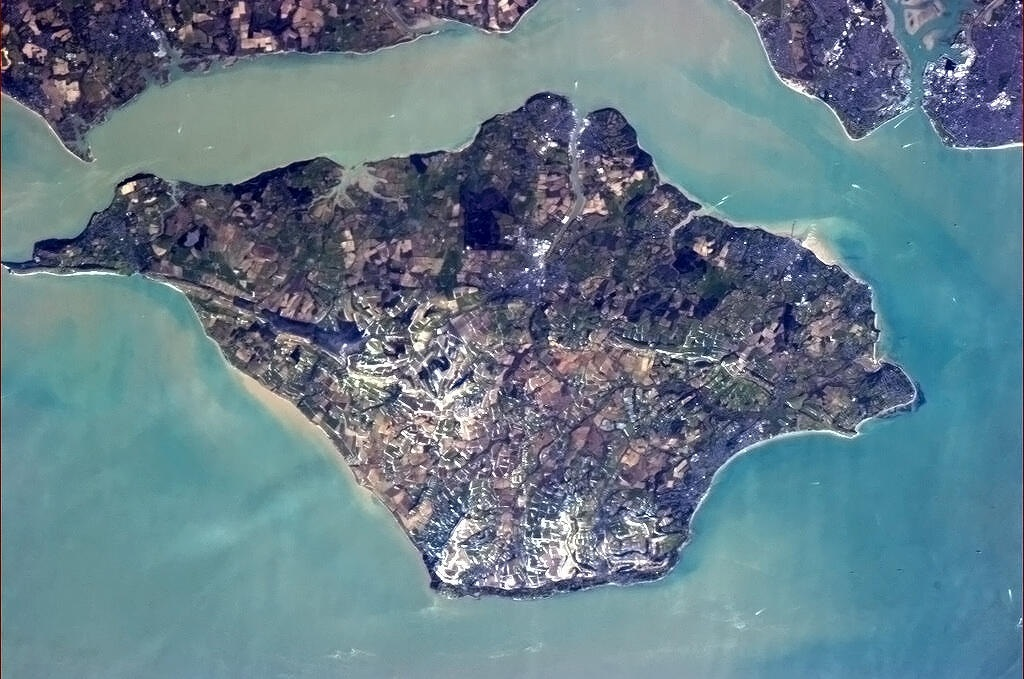
- An image of the Isle of Wight from the ISS

- Coordinates: 50°42′N 1°18′W
- Sovereign state: United Kingdom
- Constituent country: England
- Region: South East
- Time zone: UTC+0 (GMT)
  - Summer (DST): UTC+1 (BST)
- UK Parliament: Joe Robertson (Con) (Isle of Wight East); Richard Quigley (Lab) (Isle of Wight West)
- Police: Hampshire and Isle of Wight Constabulary
- County town: Newport
- Largest town: Ryde
- Ceremonial county
- Lord Lieutenant: Susan Sheldon
- High Sheriff: Nigel Alan Hartley
- Area: 380 km^{2} (150 sq mi)
  - Rank: 46th of 48
- Population (2024): 141,660
  - Rank: 46th of 48
  - Density: 373/km^{2} (970/sq mi)
- Unitary authority
- Council: Isle of Wight Council
- Control: No overall control
- Admin HQ: Newport
- Area: 380 km^{2} (150 sq mi)
  - Rank: 90th of 296
- Population (2025): 140,777
  - Rank: 169th of 296
  - Density: 371/km^{2} (960/sq mi)
- ISO 3166-2: GB-IOW
- GSS code: E06000046
- ITL: UKJ34
- Website: iow.gov.uk

The Isle of Wight (/waɪt/ WYTE) is an island off the south coast of England, in the English Channel. A ceremonial county, it is separated from the mainland county of Hampshire by the Solent strait. Its largest settlement is Ryde, and the administrative centre is Newport.

The Isle of Wight has a land area of 380 km^{2} (150 sq mi), making it the largest island in England, and had an estimated population of 141,660 in 2024. The island is largely rural, with the largest settlements primarily on the coast. These include Ryde in the north-east, Shanklin and Sandown in the south-east, and the large villages of Totland and Freshwater in the west. Newport is located inland at the point at which the River Medina broadens into its estuary, and Cowes and East Cowes flank the estuary on the northern coast. For local government purposes the island is a unitary authority area. It was historically part of Hampshire.

The island is known for its mild climate, coastal scenery, and verdant landscape of fields, downland, and chines. It is said to be the sunniest place of Great Britain. It has been designated a UNESCO Biosphere Reserve. The distance between the Isle of Wight and mainland Great Britain is between 2 and 5 miles (3 and 8 kilometres). The island also contains dinosaur fossils.

The island has played an essential part in the defence of the ports of Southampton and Portsmouth and has been near the front line of conflicts through the ages, having faced the Spanish Armada and weathered the Battle of Britain. From the Victorian era significant urban development took place as the island developed into a tourist destination; it was home to the poets Algernon Charles Swinburne and Alfred, Lord Tennyson, and Queen Victoria built her summer residence and final home, Osborne House, at East Cowes. It has a maritime and industrial tradition of boat-building, sail-making, the manufacture of flying boats, hovercraft, and Britain's space rockets. The island hosts annual music festivals, including the Isle of Wight Festival, which in 1970 was the largest rock music event ever held.

== Name ==
The oldest records that give a name for the Isle of Wight are from the Roman Empire. It was called Vectis or Vecta in Latin and Iktis (Ίκτις) or Ouiktis in Ancient Greek. Latin Vecta, Old English Wiht, and Old Welsh Gueid and Guith were recorded from the Anglo-Saxon period. In medieval Irish sources such as the Sanas Cormaic it is found as Icht, hIcht, n-Iucht and lucht. The Domesday Book of 1086 called the island Wit. The modern Welsh name is Ynys Wyth (ynys meaning 'island'). These are all variants of the same name, possibly sharing a Celtic origin with Welsh gwaith 'work', a cognate of both Latin vectis ('lever', or literally 'the act of lifting') and Old English wiht ('weight'). It may mean 'place of the division', since the island divides the two arms of the Solent.

In Old English, inhabitants of the Isle were known as Wihtware.

== History ==
=== Stone Age ===
During Pleistocene glacial periods sea levels were lower than at present, and the area that today forms the Solent was part of the valley of the now-extinct River Solent. The river flowed eastward from Dorset, following the course of the modern Solent strait. The river travelled east of the Isle of Wight before flowing southwest towards the major Channel River system. At these times, extensive gravel terraces associated with the Solent River and the forerunners of the island's modern rivers were deposited. During warmer interglacial periods, silts, beach gravels, clays, and muds of marine and estuarine origin were deposited due to higher sea levels, suggesting similar marine or estuary conditions to those experienced today.

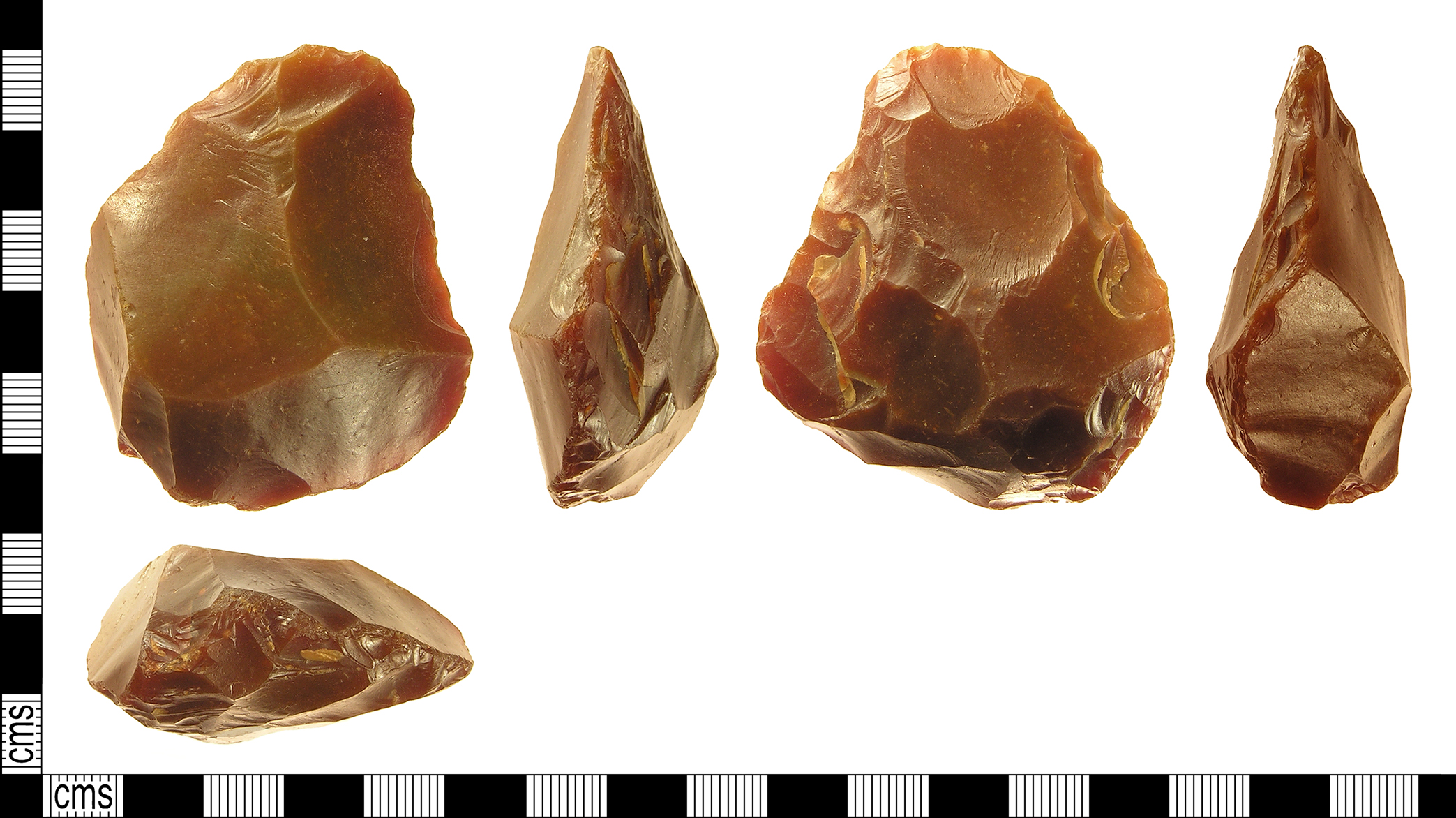
A flint hand axe from the Paleolithic, c. 500,000 BP, found on the island in 2010.

The earliest clear evidence of Lower Palaeolithic archaic human occupation on what is now the Isle of Wight is found close to Priory Bay. More than 300 acheulean handaxes have been recovered from the beach and cliff slopes, originating from a sequence of Pleistocene gravels dating approximately to MIS 11-MIS 9 (424,000–374,000 years ago). Reworked and abraded artefacts found at the site may be considerably older however, closer to 500,000 years old. The identity of the hominids who produced these tools is unknown. However, sites and fossils of the same age range in Europe are often attributed to Homo heidelbergensis or early populations of Neanderthals.

A Middle Palaeolithic Mousterian flint assemblage, consisting of 50 handaxes and debitage, has been recovered from Great Pan Farm in the Medina Valley near Newport. Gravel sequences at the site have been dated to the MIS 3 interstadial during the last glacial period (c. 50,000 years ago). These tools are associated with the late Neanderthal occupation, and evidence of late Neanderthal presence is seen across Britain at this time.

No significant evidence of Upper Palaeolithic activity exists on the Isle of Wight. This period is associated with the expansion and establishment of populations of modern human (Homo sapiens) hunter-gatherers in Europe, beginning around 45,000 years ago. However, evidence of late Upper Palaeolithic activity has been found at nearby sites on the mainland, notably Hengistbury Head in Dorset, dating to just before the onset of the Holocene and the end of the last glacial period c. 11,700 years ago.

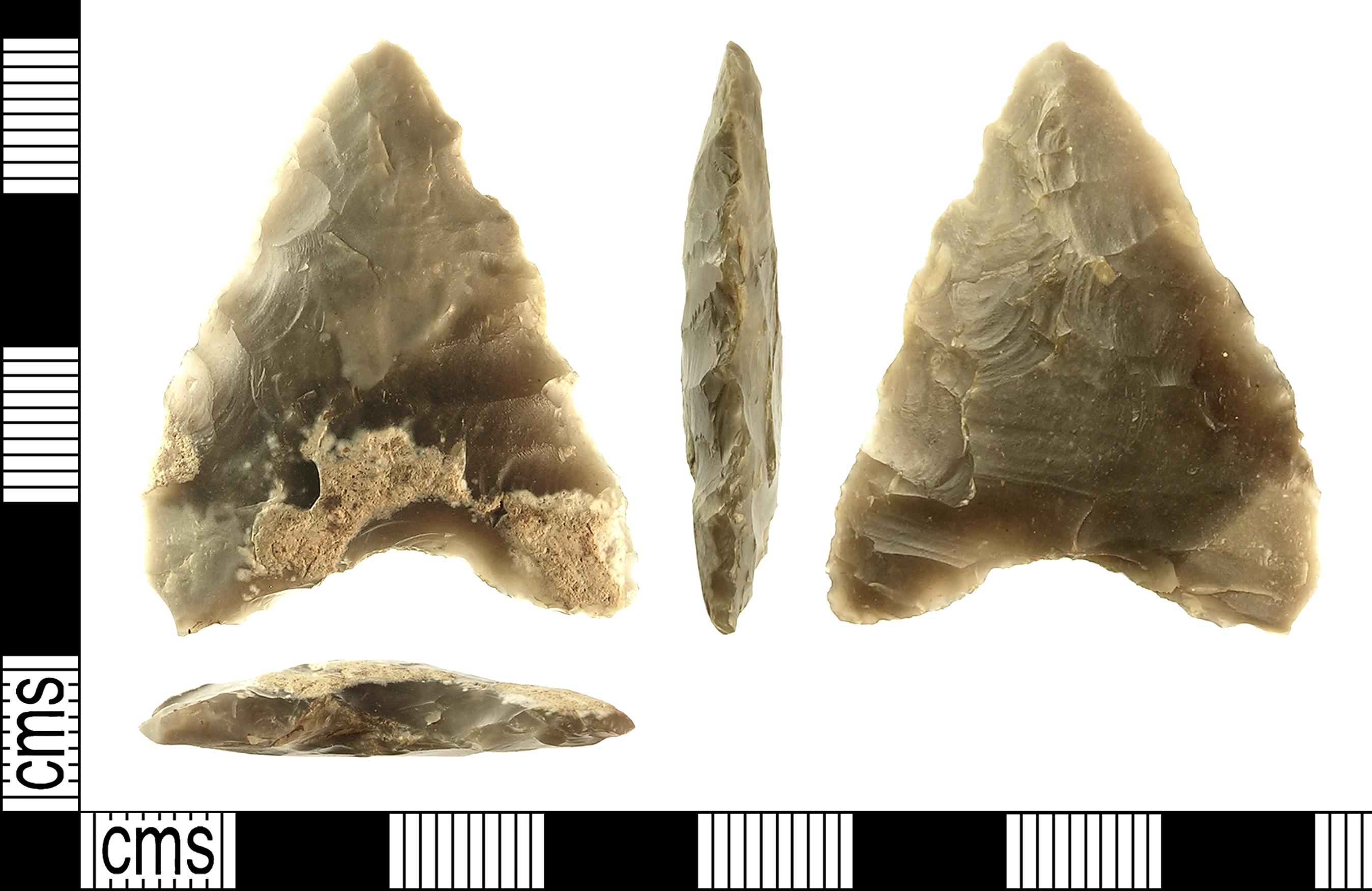
A Neolithic arrowhead from c. 2500 – c. 2100 BCE, found on the island in 2011

Evidence of Mesolithic hunter-gatherer occupation on the island is generally found along the river valleys, particularly along the Solent coastline of the island and in the former catchment of the western Yar. Other key terrestrial sites are found at Newtown Creek, Werrar, and Wootton-Quarr.

A submerged escarpment 11 metres (36 feet) below sea level off Bouldnor Cliff on the island's Solent coastline has yielded an internationally significant mesolithic archaeological site. The Bouldnor Cliff site exhibits evidence of seasonal occupation by Mesolithic hunter-gatherers dating to c. 6050 BC. Finds include flint tools, burnt flint, worked timbers, wooden platforms, and pits. The worked wood shows evidence of splitting large planks from oak trunks, interpreted as being intended for use as dug-out canoes. DNA analysis of sediments at the site yielded wheat DNA, not found in Britain until 2,000 years after the occupation at Bouldnor Cliff. It has been suggested this is evidence of wide-reaching trade in Mesolithic Europe; however, the contemporaneity of the wheat with the Mesolithic occupation has been contested. Owing to lower sea levels during the Mesolithic the hunter-gatherer site was located on a river bank surrounded by wetlands and woodland. As sea levels rose throughout the early Holocene the Solent flooded, submerging the site.

From c. 6,000 years ago migrations of farming populations to Britain from northwest Europe brought the onset of the Neolithic, largely replacing and assimilating previous mesolithic hunter-gatherer populations. On the Isle of Wight Neolithic occupation is attested to by flint tool finds, pottery and monuments. The Isle of Wight's neolithic communities were agriculturalists, farming livestock and crops. The Isle of Wight's most recognisable neolithic site is the Longstone at Mottistone, the remains of an early Neolithic long barrow. Initially constructed with two standing stones at the entrance, only one remains upright today. The site would have likely served as a communal tomb and ritual site for nearby farming communities. A Neolithic mortuary enclosure has also been identified on Tennyson Down near Freshwater.

=== Bronze Age and Iron Age ===
From c. 4,400 – c. 4,200 years ago Britain experienced a new wave of migrations from continental Europe, linked to the Bell Beaker Culture. Bell beaker migrants are typically thought to have introduced metal-working to Britain marking the beginning of the Bronze Age. Evidence of early Bronze Age occupation on the Isle of Wight include distinctive bell beaker pots, flint tools, occupation sites and finds of bronze weapons and tools, occurring either individually or in hoard deposits such as the famous Arreton hoard. Highly visible evidence of early Bronze Age activity on the Isle of Wight comes in the form of the barrow monuments present across the island's chalk downland. It is likely these barrows were high-status burial sites, and often occur in 'cemeteries' a notable example being Five Barrows near Brook.

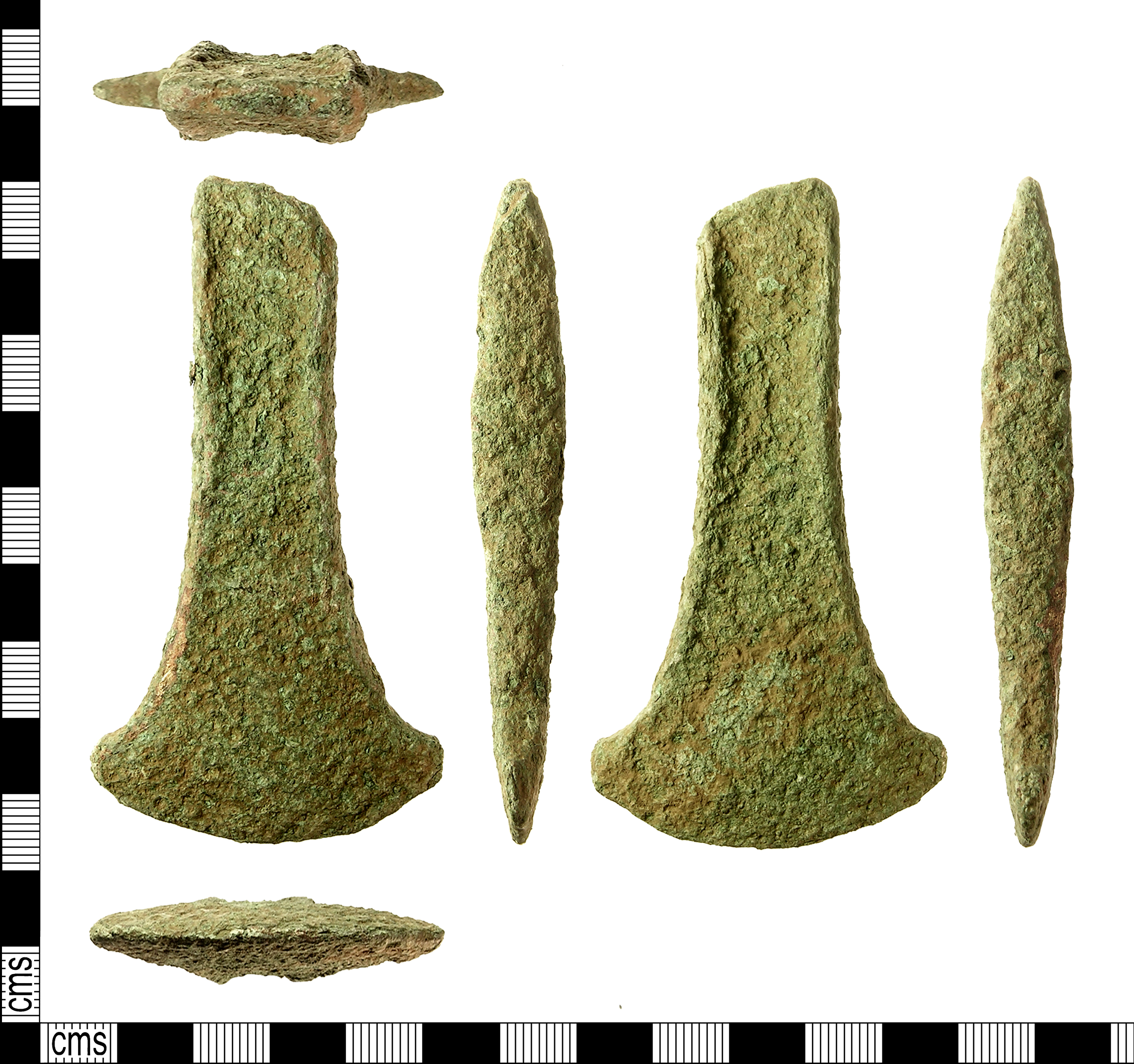
An early Bronze Age axehead from c. 2000 – c. 1700 BCE, found on the island in 2011

Bronze Age Britain had large tin reserves in Cornwall and Devon areas, which was necessary to smelt bronze. At that time, the sea level was much lower, and carts of tin were brought across the Solent at low tide for export, possibly on the Ferriby Boats. Anthony Snodgrass suggests that a shortage of tin, as a part of the Bronze Age Collapse and trade disruptions in the Mediterranean around 1300 BC, forced metalworkers to seek an alternative to bronze.

From the 7th century BC, during the Late Iron Age, the Isle of Wight, like the rest of Great Britain, was occupied by the Celtic Britons, in the form of the Durotriges tribe, as attested by finds of their coins, for example, the South Wight Hoard, and the Shalfleet Hoard. The island was known as Ynys Weith in Brittonic Celtic. Southeastern Britain experienced significant immigration, which is reflected in the current residents' genetic makeup. As the Iron Age began, tin value likely dropped sharply, greatly changing the Isle of Wight's economy. Trade, however, continued, as evidenced by the local abundance of European Iron Age coins.

=== Roman period ===
Julius Caesar reported that the Belgae took the Isle of Wight in about 85 BC, and recognised the culture of this general region as "Belgic" but made no reference to Vectis. The Roman historian Suetonius mentions that the island was captured by the commander Vespasian. The Romans built no towns on the island, but the remains of at least seven Roman villas have been found, indicating the prosperity of local agriculture. First-century exports were principally hides, enslaved people, hunting dogs, grain, cattle, silver, gold, and iron.

=== Early medieval period ===
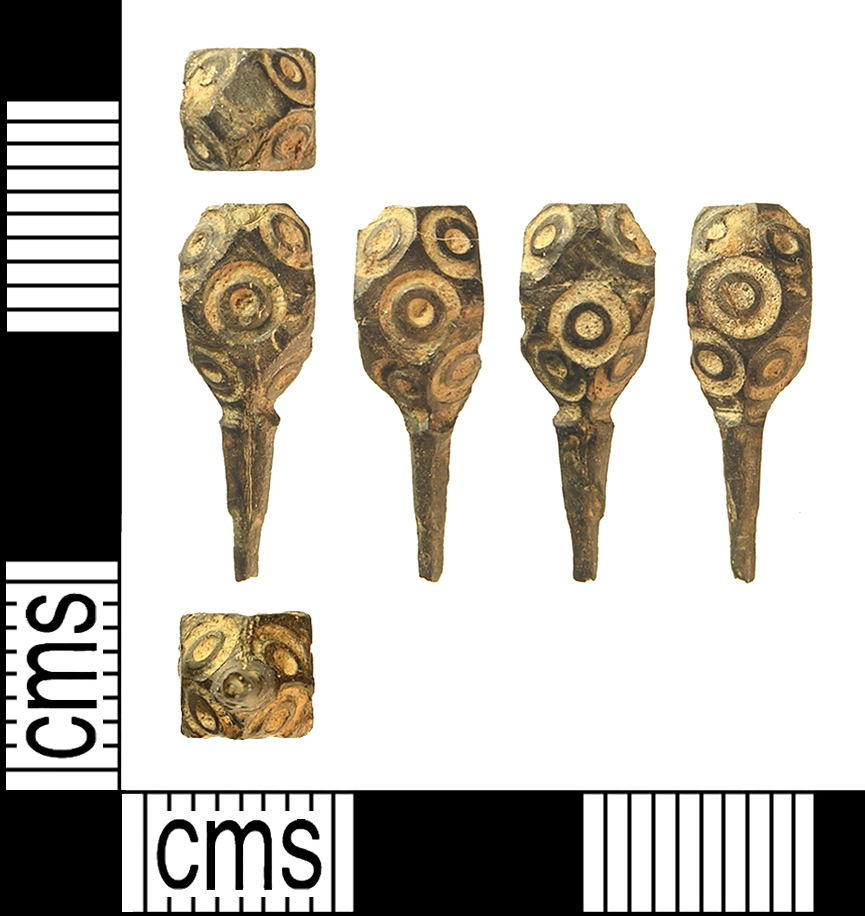
An Anglo-Saxon copper-alloy pin, dating from c. 700 – c. 900, found on the island in 2012

There are indications that the island had vast trading links, with a port at Bouldnor, evidence of Bronze Age tin trading, and finds of Late Iron Age coins. Starting in AD 449, the 5th and 6th centuries saw groups of Germanic-speaking peoples from Northern Europe crossing the English Channel and gradually set about conquering the region.

During the Early Middle Ages, the island was settled by Jutes as the heathen kingdom of the Wihtwara. In Asser’s Life of Alfred, he states that the West Saxon kings Cerdic and Cynric granted lordship of the Isle of Wight to two brothers, Stuf and Wihtgar, said to be of Jutish and Gothic origin and cousins of Cynric. The brothers then set about exterminating the native Britons, either killing them or driving them into exile. According to Bede, in 685, the Isle of Wight was invaded by King Cædwalla of Wessex, who attempted to violently replace the Jutish inhabitants with his own followers. In 686, the native King Arwald was killed in battle, and the island became the last part of English lands to be converted to Christianity.

It suffered especially from Viking raids and was often used as a winter base by Viking raiders when they could not reach Normandy. Later, both Earl Tostig and his brother Harold Godwinson (who became King Harold II) held manors on the island.

=== Norman Conquest to 18th century ===
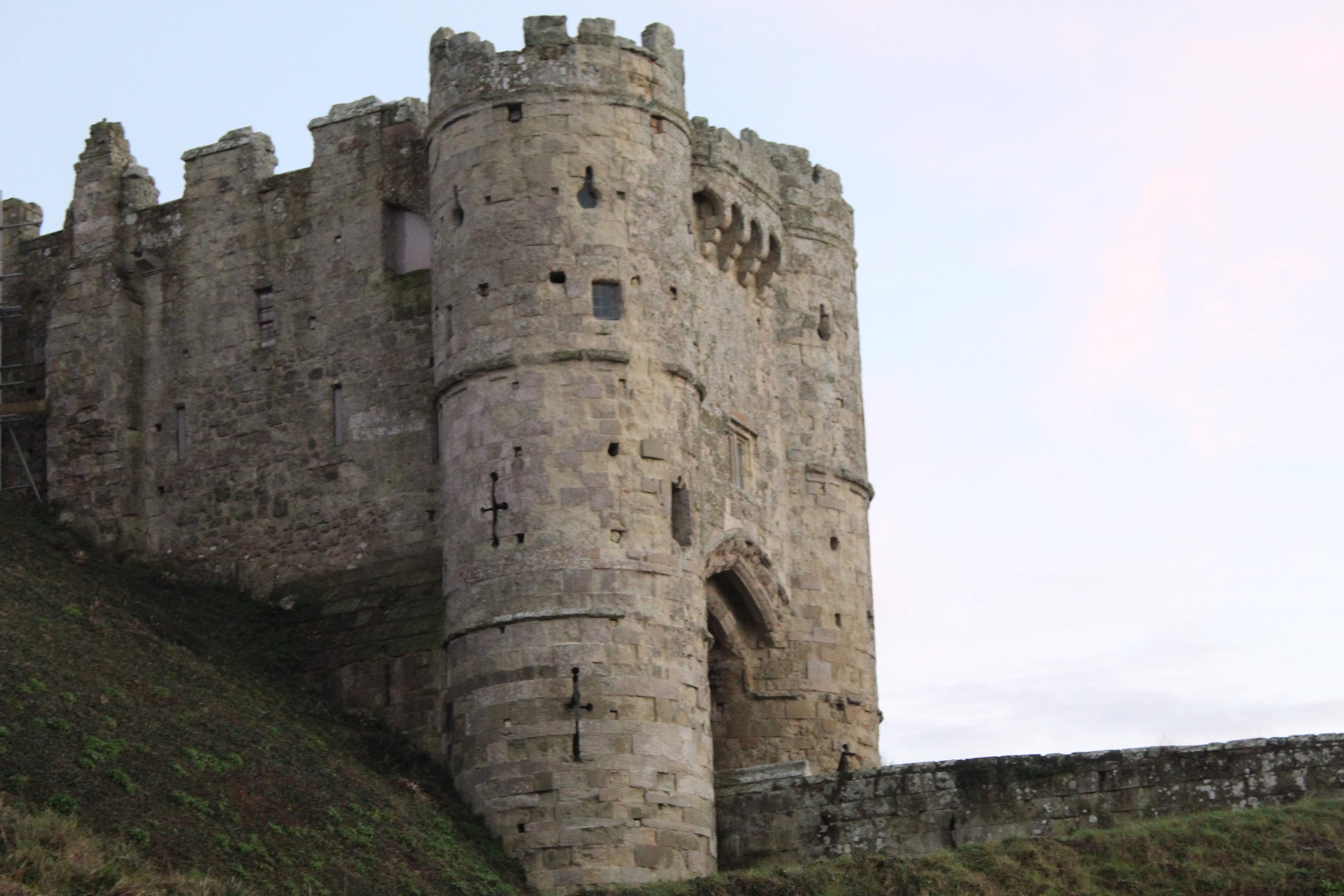
Carisbrooke Castle

The Norman Conquest of 1066 created the position of Lord of the Isle of Wight; the island was given by William the Conqueror to his kinsman William FitzOsbern. Carisbrooke Priory and the fort of Carisbrooke Castle were then founded. Allegiance was sworn to FitzOsbern rather than the king; the Lordship was subsequently granted to the de Redvers family by Henry I after his succession in 1100.

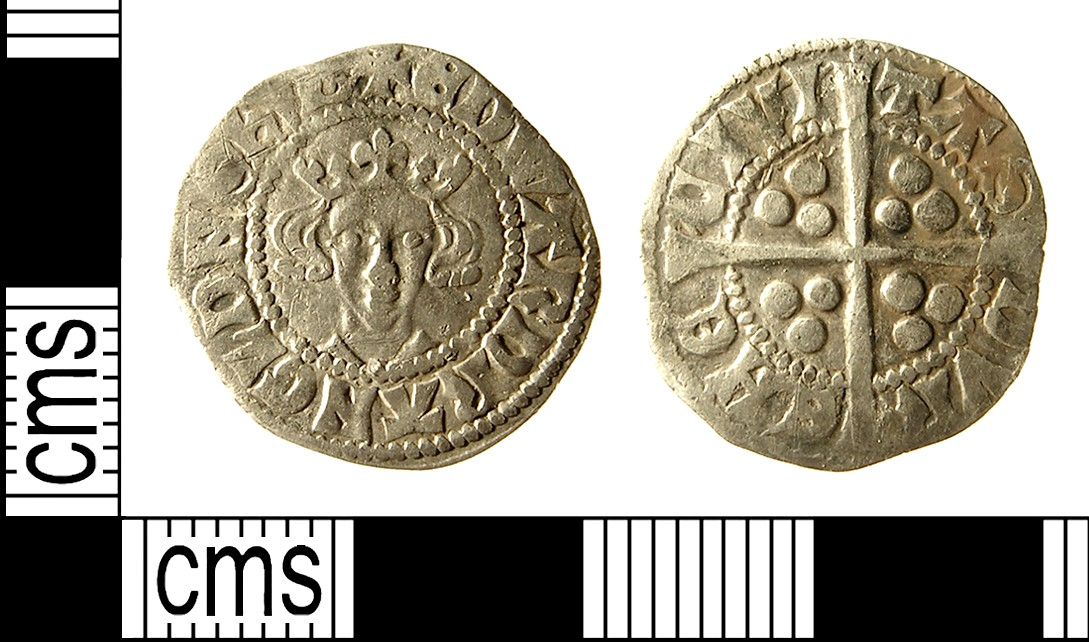
A silver penny of Edward I, minted 1300–1305, found on the island in 2011

For nearly 200 years the island was a semi-independent feudal fiefdom, with the de Redvers family ruling from Carisbrooke. The final private owner was the Countess Isabella de Fortibus, who, on her deathbed in 1293, was persuaded to sell it to Edward I. Subsequently, the island was under the control of the English Crown and its Lordship a royal appointment.

The island continued to be attacked from the continent: it was raided in 1374 by the fleet of Castile and in 1377 by French raiders who burned several towns, including Newtown.

Under Henry VIII, who developed the Royal Navy and its Portsmouth base, the island was fortified at Yarmouth, Cowes, East Cowes, and Sandown.

The French invasion on 21 July 1545 (famous for the sinking of the Mary Rose on the 19th) was repulsed by local militia.

On 1 May 1647, Swedish and English ships clashed in a brief skirmish off the island, ending in the Swedish fleet being able to escape.

During the English Civil War, King Charles I fled to the Isle of Wight, believing he would receive sympathy from Governor Robert Hammond. Still, Hammond imprisoned the king in Carisbrooke Castle.

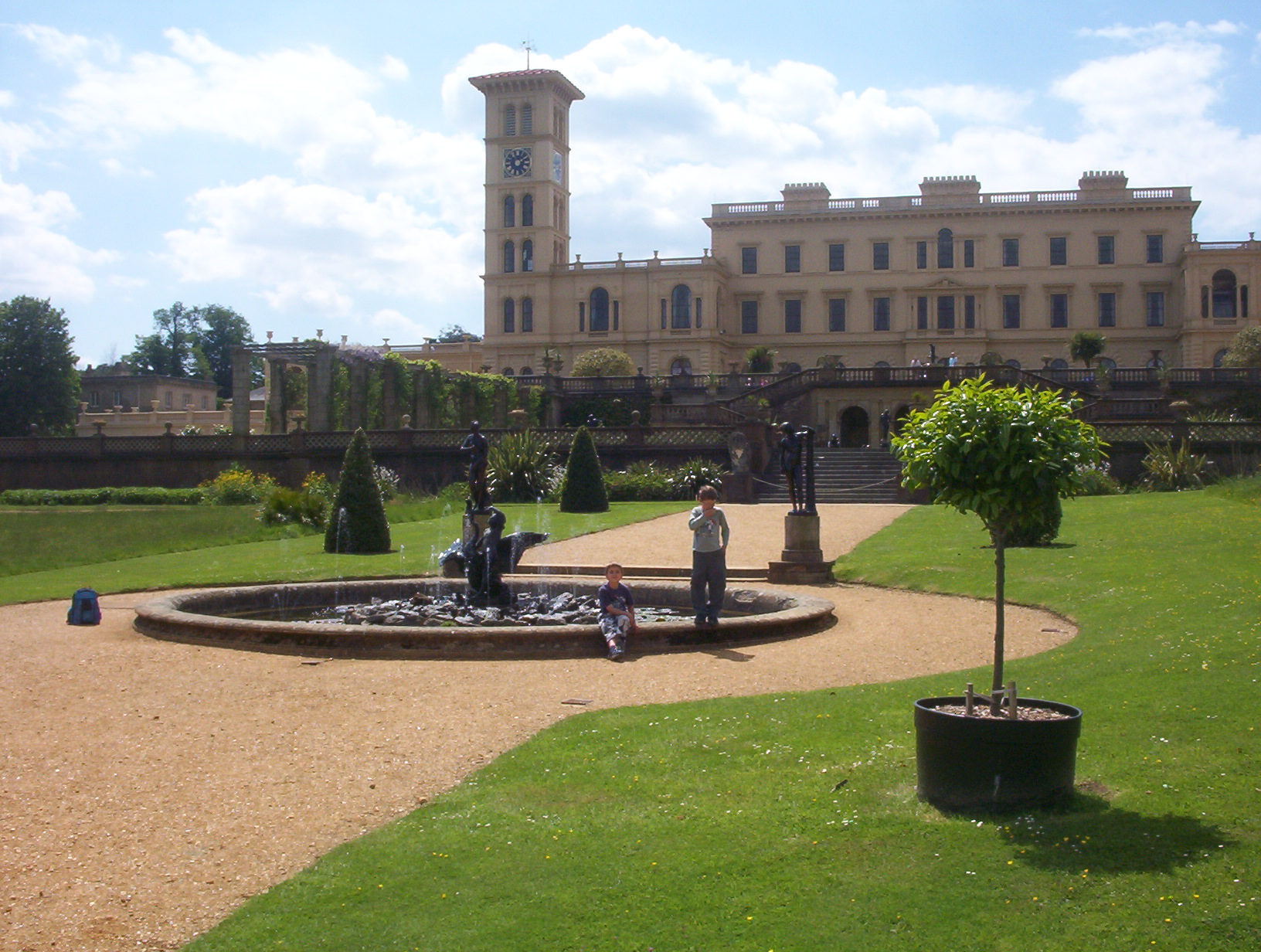
Osborne House and its grounds are now open to the public.

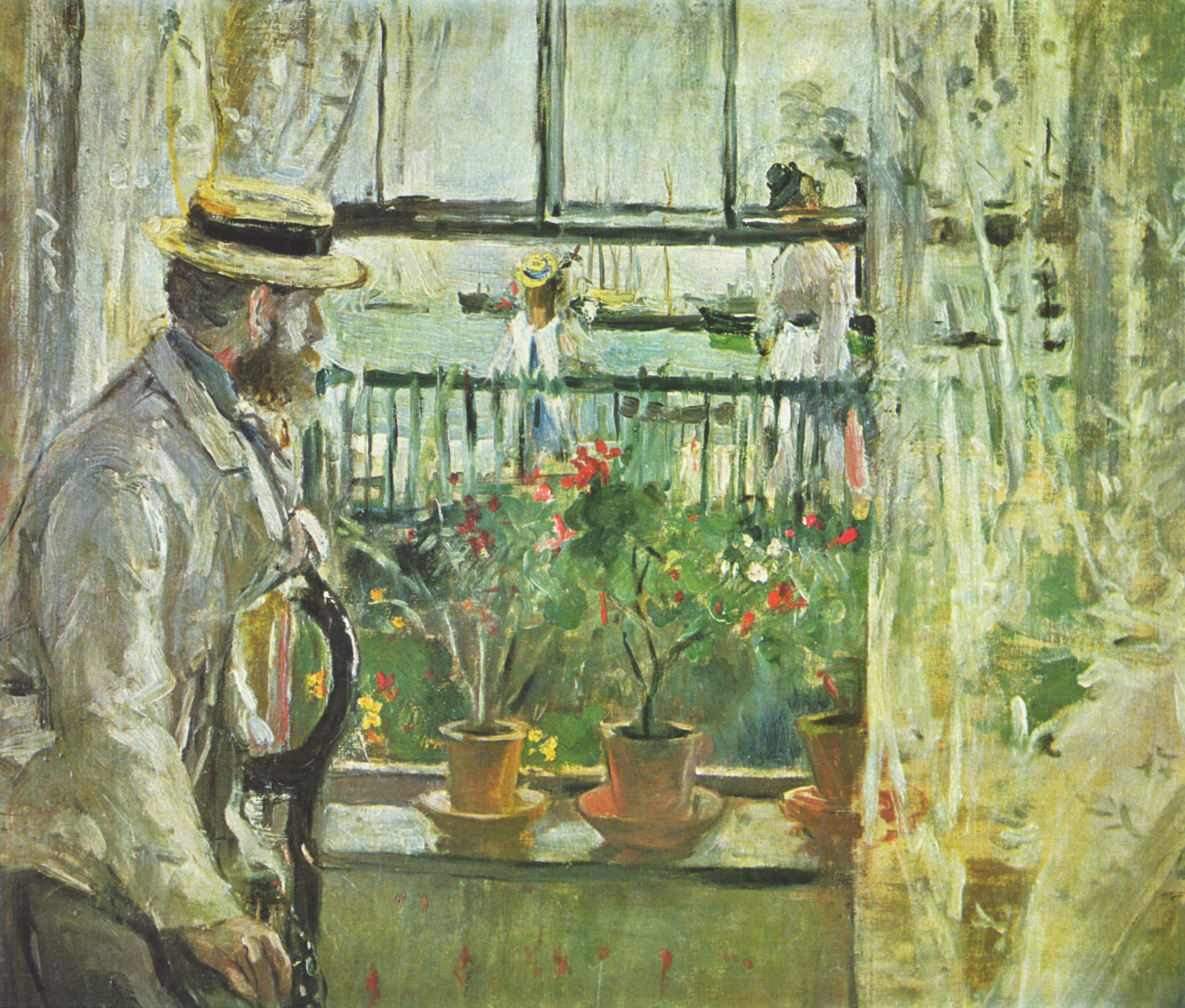
Eugene Manet on the Isle of Wight, 1875 painting by Berthe Morisot

During the Seven Years' War, the island was a staging post for British troops departing on expeditions against the French coast, such as the Raid on Rochefort. During 1759, with a planned French invasion imminent, a large force of soldiers was stationed there. The French called off their invasion following the Battle of Quiberon Bay.

=== 19th century ===
In the spring of 1817, the 21 year old John Keats spent time in Carisbrooke and Shanklin, where he found inspiration in the countryside and coast, and worked on his long poem Endymion.

In the mid-1840s, potato blight was first found in the UK on the island, having arrived from Belgium. It was later transmitted to Ireland.

In the 1860s, what remains in real terms the most expensive ever government spending project saw fortifications built on the island and in the Solent, as well as elsewhere along the south coast, including the Palmerston Forts, The Needles Batteries, and Fort Victoria, because of fears about possible French invasion.

The future Queen Victoria spent childhood holidays on the island and became fond of it. When she became queen, she made Osborne House her winter home. Subsequently, the island became a fashionable holiday resort for many, including Alfred, Lord Tennyson, Julia Margaret Cameron, and Charles Dickens (who wrote much of David Copperfield there), as well as the French painter Berthe Morisot and members of European royalty.

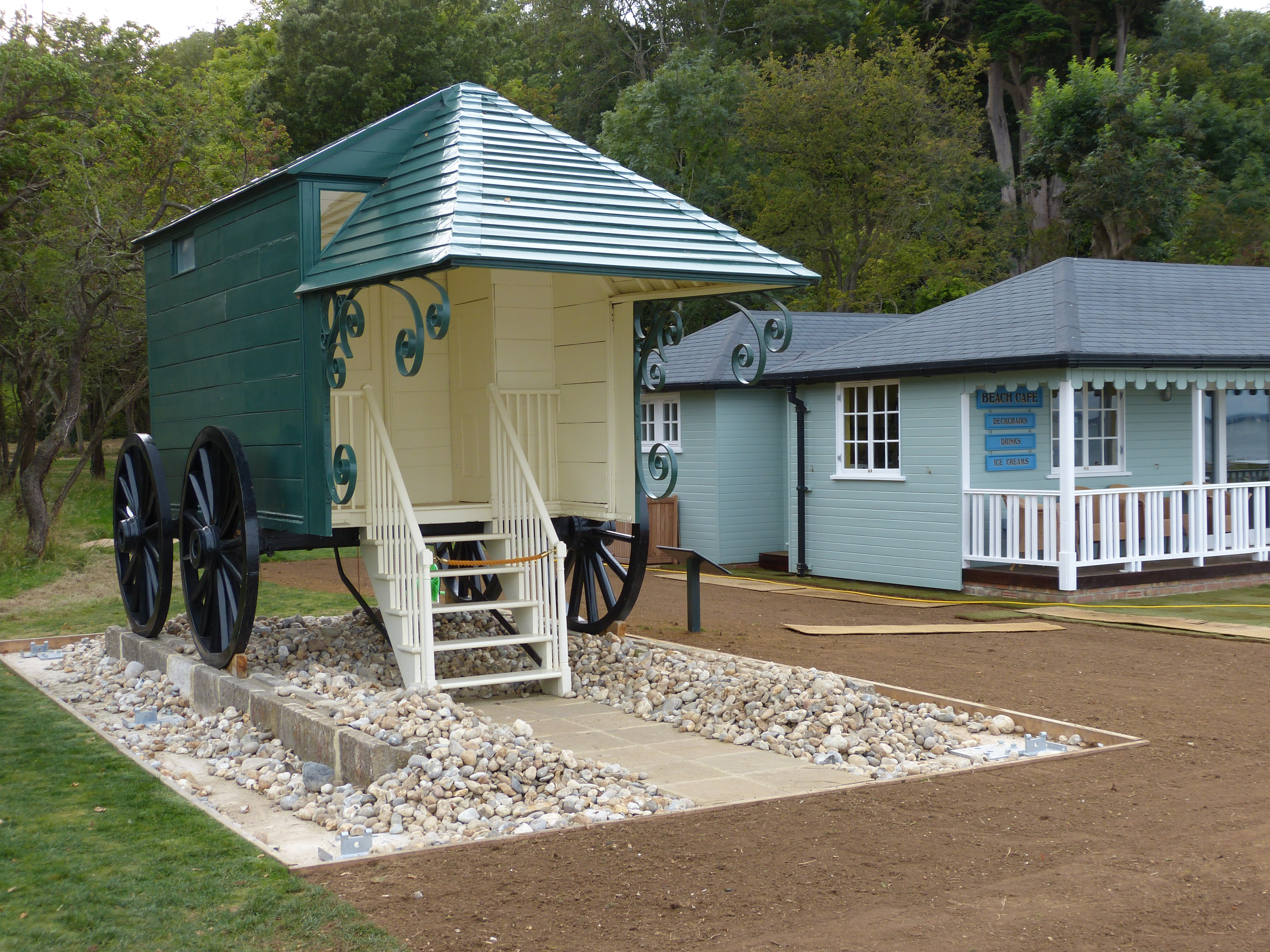
Queen Victoria's bathing machine, preserved at Queen Victoria's Beach east of Osborne House

Until the queen's example, the island had been rural, with most people employed in farming, fishing, or boat-building. The boom in tourism, spurred by growing wealth and leisure time and by Victoria's presence, led to the significant urban development of the island's coastal resorts. As one report summarises, "The Queen's regular presence on the island helped put the Isle of Wight 'on the map' as a Victorian holiday and wellness destination ... and her former residence Osborne House is now one of the most visited attractions on the island." While on the island, the queen used a bathing machine that could be wheeled into the water on Osborne Beach; inside the small wooden hut, she could undress and then bathe, without being visible to others. Her machine had a changing room and a WC with plumbing. The refurbished machine is now displayed at the beach.

On 14 January 1878, Alexander Graham Bell demonstrated an early version of the telephone to the queen, placing calls to Cowes, Southampton, and London. These were the first publicly-witnessed long-distance telephone calls in the UK. The queen tried the device and considered the process to be "quite extraordinary" although the sound was "rather faint". She later asked to buy the equipment that was used, but Bell offered to make "a set of telephones" specifically for her.

The world's first radio station was set up by Guglielmo Marconi in 1897, during her reign, at the Needles Battery, at the western tip of the island. A 168-foot (51 m) high mast was erected near the Royal Needles Hotel as part of an experiment on communicating with ships at sea. That location is now the site of the Marconi Monument. In 1898 the first paid wireless telegram (called a "Marconigram") was sent from this station, and the island was for some time the home of the National Wireless Museum near Ryde.

Queen Victoria died at Osborne House on 22 January 1901 at 81.

=== 20th century and later ===
During the Second World War, the island was frequently bombed. With its proximity to German-occupied France, the island hosted observation stations, transmitters, and the RAF radar station at Ventnor. Adolf Hitler personally suggested an invasion of the Isle of Wight as a supplementary operation for Operation Sealion, and the possibility of an invasion was incorporated into Fuhrer Directive 16. Field Marshal Alan Brooke, in charge of defending the UK during 1940, was sceptical about being able to hold the island in the face of an invasion, instead considering that British forces would retreat to the western side of the island rather than commit forces against what might be a diversionary landing. In the end no invasion of the island was carried out as German naval commanders feared any invasion force might be cut off by British naval forces, particularly Royal Navy submarines.

The island was the starting point for one of the earlier Operation Pluto pipelines to feed fuel to Europe after the Normandy landings.

The Needles Battery was used to develop and test the Black Arrow and Black Knight space rockets, which were subsequently launched from Woomera, Australia.

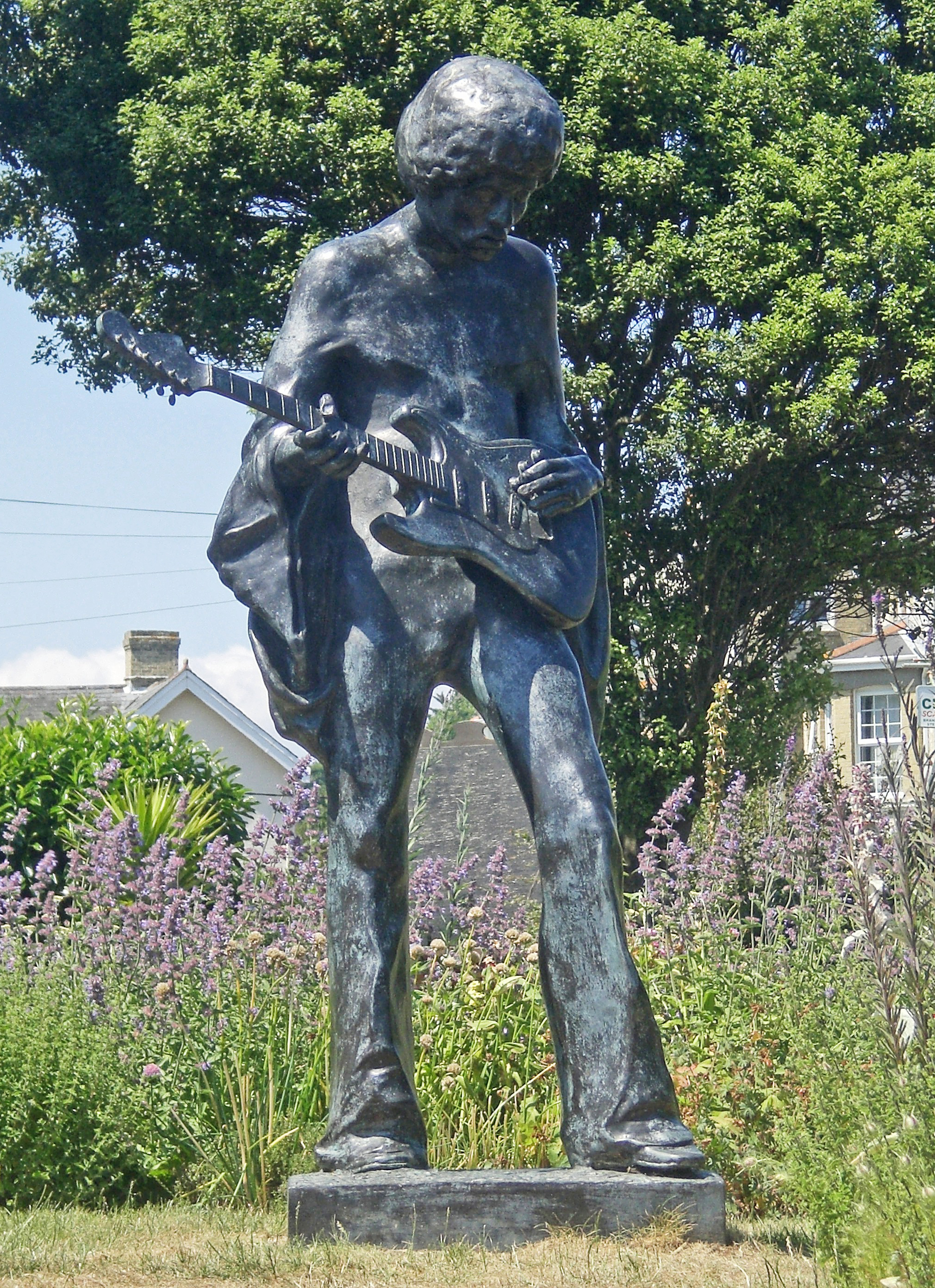
Statue of Jimi Hendrix outside Dimbola Lodge

The Isle of Wight Festival was a large rock festival near Afton Down, West Wight, in August 1970, following two smaller events in 1968 and 1969. The 1970 show was one of the last public performances by Jimi Hendrix and attracted somewhere between 600,000 and 700,000 attendees. The festival was revived in 2002 in a different format and is now an annual event.

On 26 October 2020, an oil tanker, the Nave Andromeda, suspected to have been hijacked by Nigerian stowaways, was stormed southeast of the island by the Special Boat Service. Seven people believed to be Nigerians seeking UK asylum were handed over to Hampshire Police.

== Governance ==
The coat of arms of the Isle of Wight Council

The island had a single Member of Parliament until 2024. The Isle of Wight constituency covered the entire island, with 138,300 permanent residents in 2011, making it one of the most populated constituencies in the United Kingdom (more than 50% above the English average). Following passage of the Parliamentary Voting System and Constituencies Act 2011, the Sixth Periodic Review of Westminster constituencies was to have changed this, but this was deferred to no earlier than October 2022 by the Electoral Registration and Administration Act 2013. Thus the single constituency remained for the 2015, 2017 and 2019 general elections. However, two separate constituencies, Isle of Wight East and Isle of Wight West were created for the island under the 2022 review, and were first contested in the 2024 general election.

The Isle of Wight is a ceremonial county and unitary authority. Since the abolition of its two borough councils and restructuring of the Isle of Wight County Council into the new Isle of Wight Council in 1995, it has been administered by a single tier Island Council which has the same powers as a unitary authority in England.

There have been small regionalist movements: the Vectis National Party and the Isle of Wight Party; but they have attracted little support at elections.

== Geography and environment ==
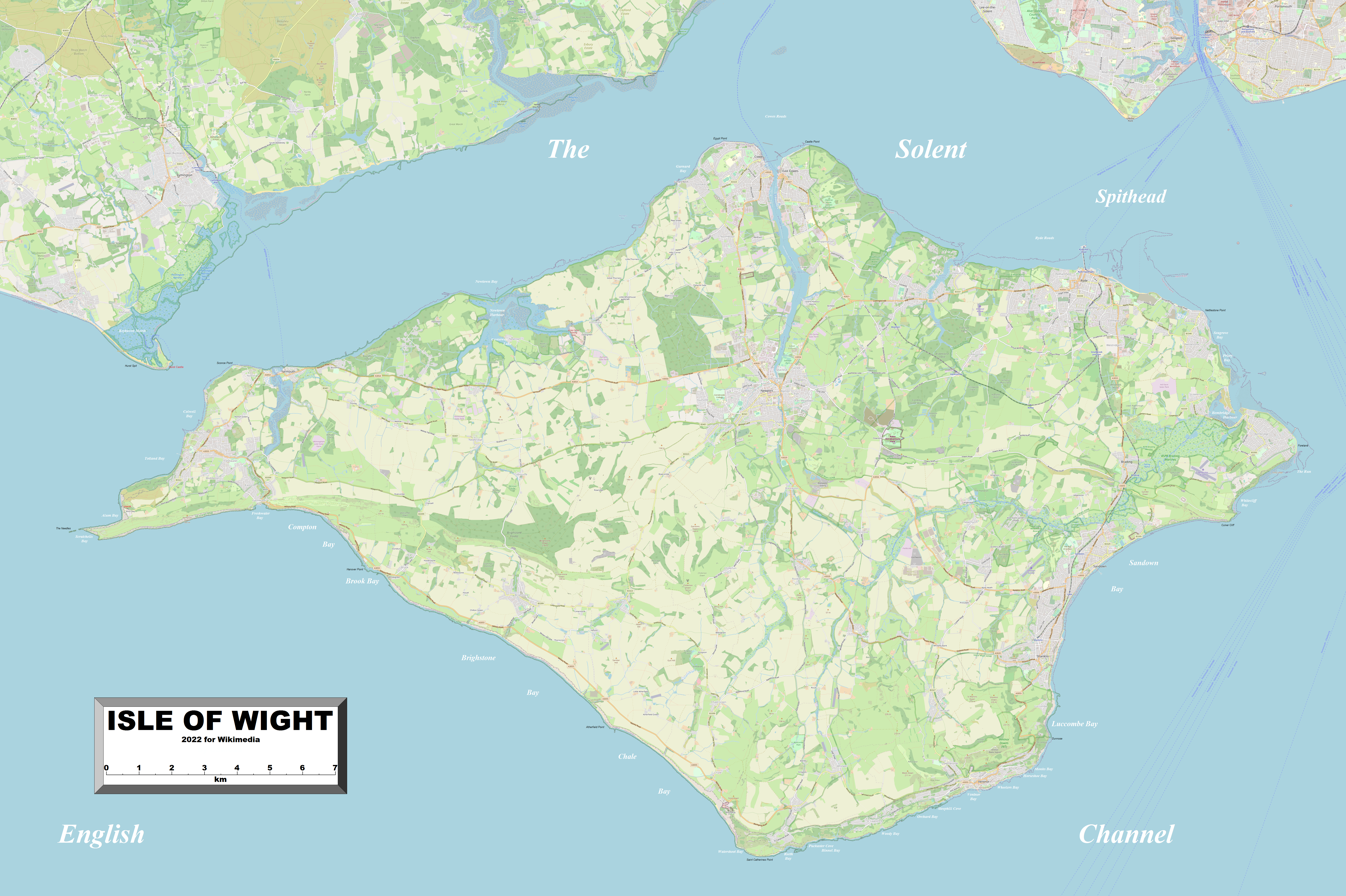
Detailed map of the Isle of Wight

The Isle of Wight is situated between the Solent and the English Channel, is roughly rhomboid in shape, and covers an area of 150 sq mi (380 km^{2}). Slightly more than half, mainly in the west, is designated as the Isle of Wight Area of Outstanding Natural Beauty. The island has 100 sq mi (258 km^{2}) of farmland, 20 sq mi (52 km^{2}) of developed areas, and 57 miles (92 km) of coastline. Its landscapes are diverse, leading to its oft-quoted description as "England in miniature". In June 2019 the whole island was designated a UNESCO Biosphere Reserve, recognising the sustainable relationships between its residents and the local environment.

West Wight is predominantly rural, with dramatic coastlines dominated by the chalk downland ridge, running across the whole island and ending in the Needles stacks. The southwestern quarter is commonly referred to as the Back of the Wight, and has a unique character. The highest point on the island is St Boniface Down in the south east, which at 241 m (791 ft) is a marilyn. The most notable habitats on the rest of the island are probably the soft cliffs and sea ledges, which are scenic features, important for wildlife, and internationally protected.

The island has three principal rivers. The River Medina flows north into the Solent, the Eastern Yar flows roughly northeast to Bembridge Harbour, and the Western Yar flows the short distance from Freshwater Bay to a relatively large estuary at Yarmouth. Without human intervention the sea might well have split the island into three: at the west end where a bank of pebbles separates Freshwater Bay from the marshy backwaters of the Western Yar east of Freshwater, and at the east end where a thin strip of land separates Sandown Bay from the marshy Eastern Yar basin.

The Undercliff between St Catherine's Point and Bonchurch is the largest area of landslip morphology in western Europe.

The north coast is unusual in having four high tides each day, with a double high tide every twelve and a half hours. This arises because the western Solent is narrower than the eastern; the initial tide of water flowing from the west starts to ebb before the stronger flow around the south of the island returns through the eastern Solent to create a second high water.

=== Geology ===
The Isle of Wight is made up of a variety of rock types dating from early Cretaceous (around 127 million years ago) to the middle of the Palaeogene (around 30 million years ago). The geological structure is dominated by a large monocline which causes a marked change in age of strata from the northern younger Tertiary beds to the older Cretaceous beds of the south. This gives rise to a dip of almost 90 degrees in the chalk beds, seen best at the Needles.

The northern half of the island is mainly composed of clays, with the southern half formed of the chalk of the central east–west downs, as well as Upper and Lower Greensands and Wealden strata. These strata continue west from the island across the Solent into Dorset, forming the basin of Poole Harbour (Tertiary) and the Isle of Purbeck (Cretaceous) respectively. The chalky ridges of the Isle of Wight and Purbeck were a single formation before they were breached by waters from the River Frome during the last ice age, forming the Solent and turning the Isle of Wight into an island. The Needles, along with Old Harry Rocks on Purbeck, represent the edges of this breach.

All the rocks found on the island are sedimentary, such as limestones, mudstones and sandstones. They are rich in fossils; many can be seen exposed on beaches as the cliffs erode. Lignitic coal is present in small quantities within seams, and can be seen on the cliffs and shore at Whitecliff Bay. Fossilised molluscs have been found there, and also on the northern coast along with fossilised crocodiles, turtles and mammal bones; the youngest date back to around 30 million years ago.

The island is one of the most important areas in Europe for dinosaur fossils. The eroding cliffs often reveal previously hidden remains, particularly along the Back of the Wight. Dinosaur bones and fossilised footprints can be seen in and on the rocks exposed around the island's beaches, especially at Yaverland and Compton Bay, from the strata of the Wessex Formation. As a result, the island has been nicknamed "Dinosaur Island" and Dinosaur Isle was established in 2001.

The area was affected by sea level changes during the repeated Quaternary glaciations. The island probably became separated from the mainland about 125,000 years ago, during the Ipswichian interglacial.

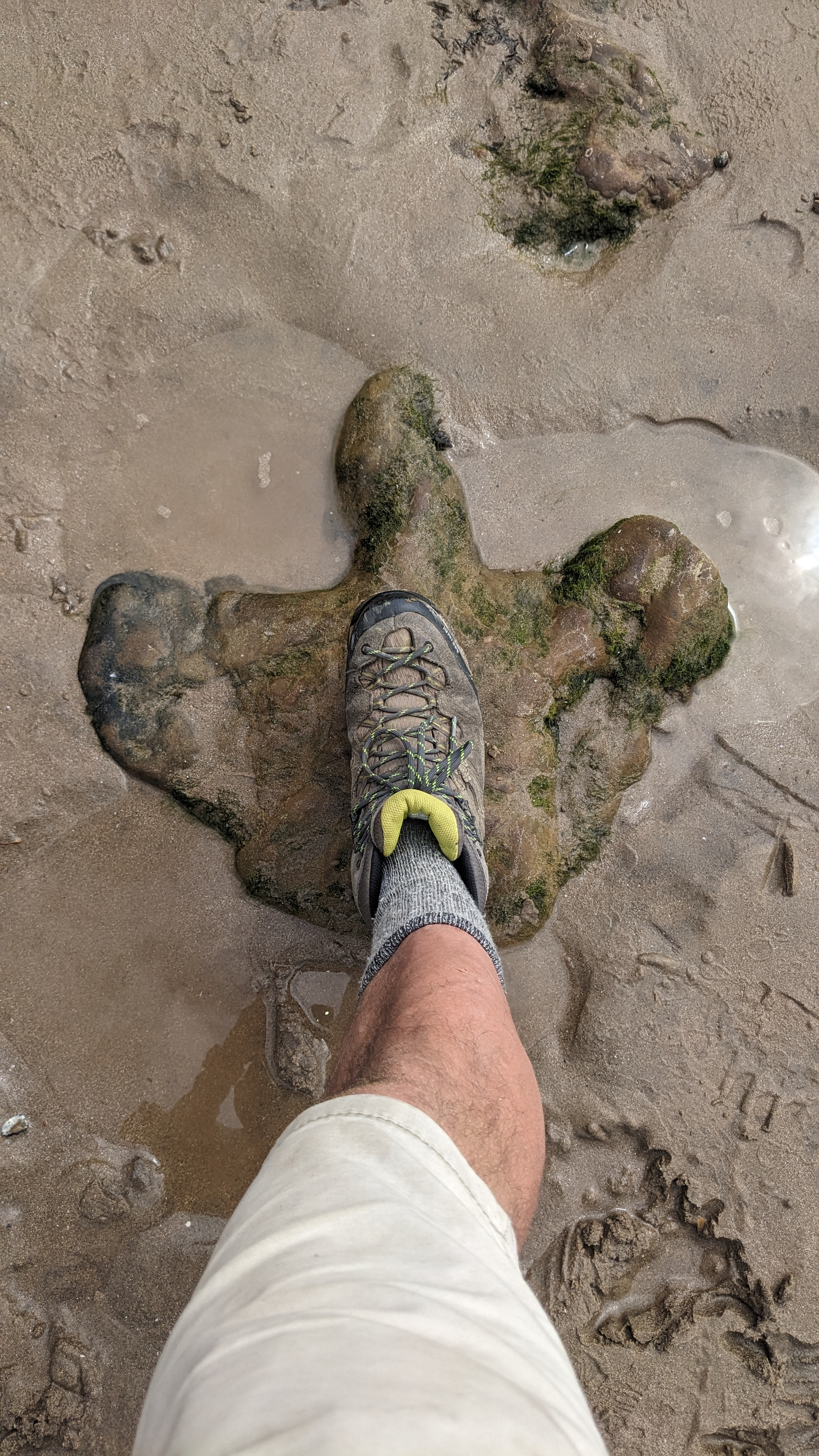
Dinosaur Footprint - Compton Beach

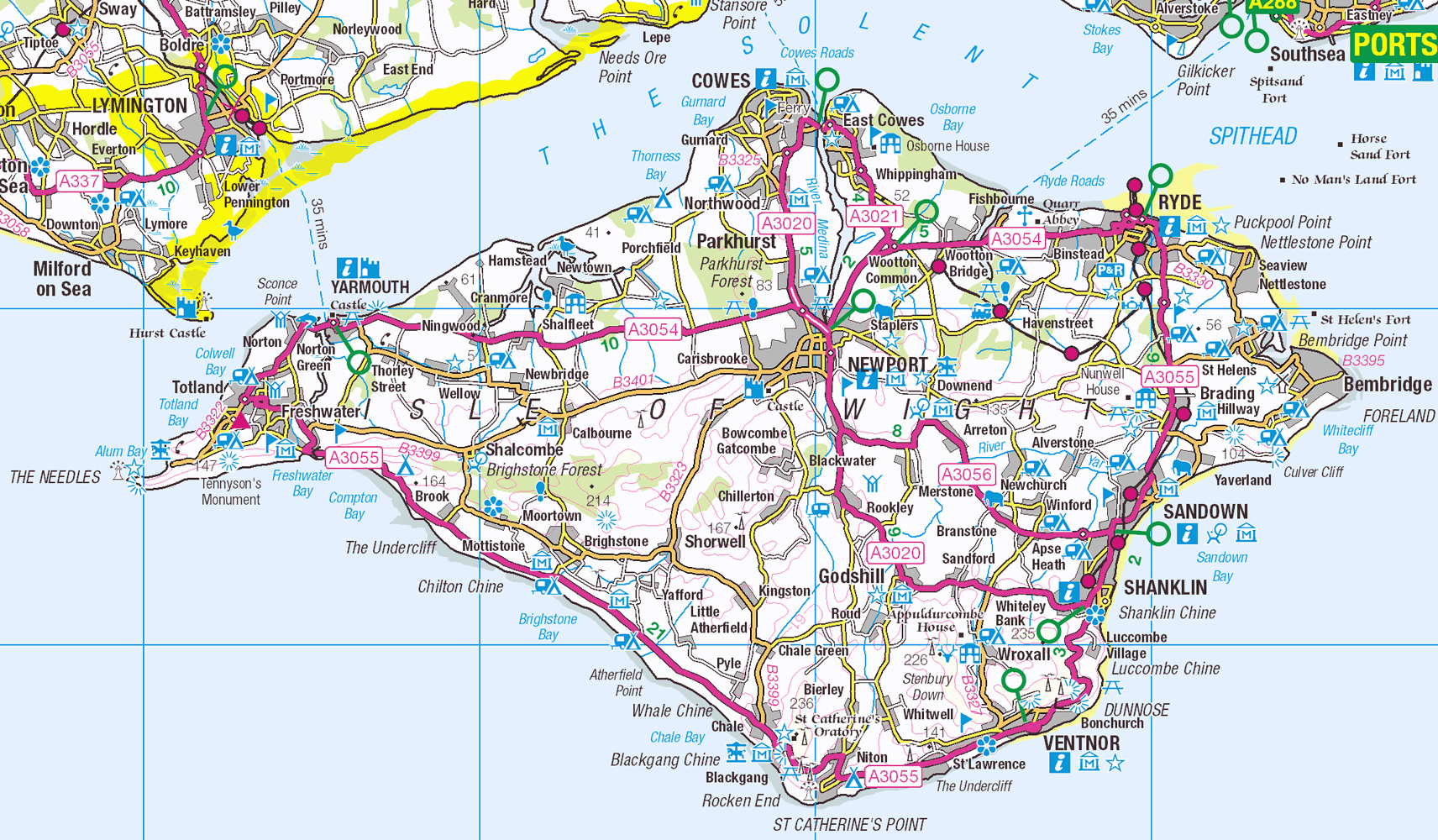
Ordnance Survey map of the island

Geological map of the island

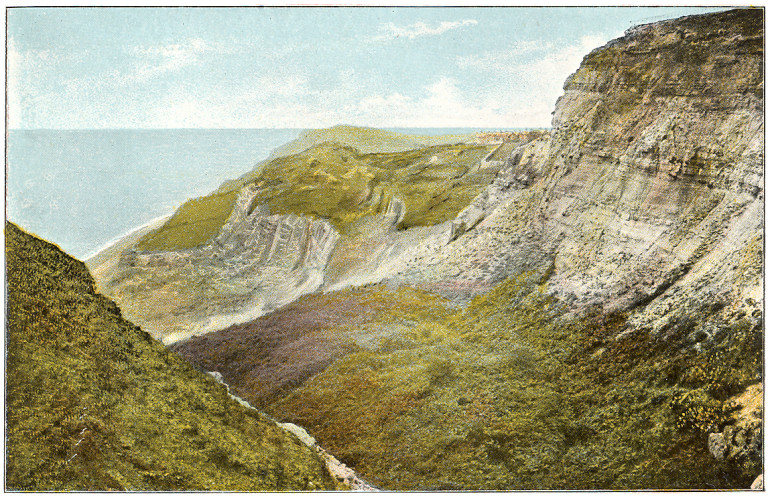
Blackgang Chine, circa 1910

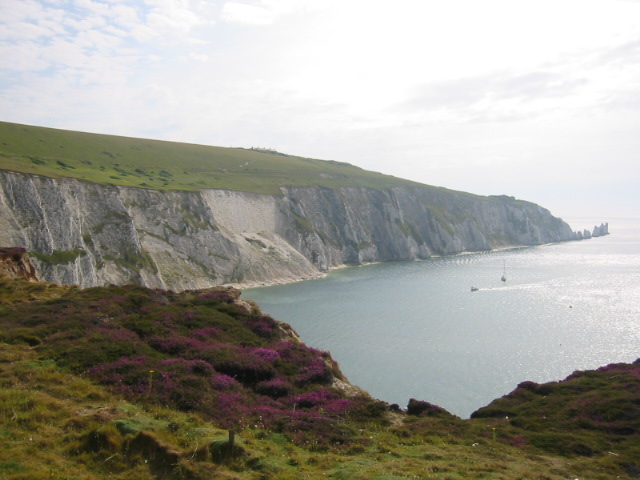
A view of the Needles and Alum Bay

=== Climate ===
Like the rest of the UK, the island has an oceanic climate, but is somewhat milder and sunnier, which makes it a holiday destination. It also has a longer growing season. Lower Ventnor and the neighbouring Undercliff have a particular microclimate, because of their sheltered position south of the downs. The island enjoys 1,800–2,100 hours of sunshine a year. Some years have almost no snow in winter, and only a few days of hard frost. The island is in Hardiness zone 9.

Climate data for Shanklin
Month	Jan	Feb	Mar	Apr	May	Jun	Jul	Aug	Sep	Oct	Nov	Dec	Year
Mean daily maximum °C (°F)	8.5 (47.3)	8.3 (46.9)	9.8 (49.6)	12.1 (53.8)	15.0 (59.0)	17.3 (63.1)	19.4 (66.9)	19.9 (67.8)	15.4 (59.7)	15.0 (59.0)	12.1 (53.8)	9.5 (49.1)	13.5 (56.3)
Mean daily minimum °C (°F)	4.8 (40.6)	4.3 (39.7)	5.4 (41.7)	7.0 (44.6)	9.8 (49.6)	12.4 (54.3)	14.6 (58.3)	15.1 (59.2)	13.5 (56.3)	11.1 (52.0)	8.0 (46.4)	5.6 (42.1)	9.3 (48.7)
Average precipitation mm (inches)	76.4 (3.01)	56.3 (2.22)	47.1 (1.85)	46.8 (1.84)	44.9 (1.77)	42.5 (1.67)	40.1 (1.58)	50.9 (2.00)	57.0 (2.24)	87.5 (3.44)	87.8 (3.46)	88.1 (3.47)	725.4 (28.55)
Average precipitation days (≥ 1.0)	12.1	10.2	9.0	8.5	7.5	7.0	6.6	7.8	7.9	11.8	13.5	13.2	115.1
Mean monthly sunshine hours	68.2	89.8	132.9	201.4	241.1	247.7	262.3	240.9	173.1	122.3	82.6	60.7	1,923
Source: Met Office Climate Averages, St Catherines Point, 1991–2020 (Sunshine hours from 1981–2010 stats)

=== Flora and fauna ===
The Isle of Wight is one of the few places in England where the European red squirrel is still flourishing, as no competing grey squirrels are to be found there. Other mammalian species on the island include the European badger, hedgehog, least weasel, red fox and stoat, with the hedgehogs proving to be quite popular amongst locals and visitors alike; in 2019, a rescue and rehabilitation group was organised to assist them, called Save Our Hedgehogs Isle of Wight. The island is also home to several protected species, such as the European dormouse and several rare bats, including the western barbastelle.

There are several species of deer on the island, both endemic and non-native, all of which are monitored and surveyed annually by the organisation Isle of Wight Deer Conservation. According to the British Deer Society (BDS), the Isle of Wight Biodiversity Group would like to see the island's ecosystems and flora preserved, one method being to keep the island "deer-free"; however, of the five types of deer documented, the European red deer and roe deer are truly native species, having been known to swim to the island from the mainland.

The diminutive Chinese Reeve's muntjac or barking deer—so-called due to its signature dog-like "bark" when threatened—is one of the smallest deer species on Earth and is present on the island. The Asian sika (the second-largest species on the island) and Eurasian fallow deer also will journey to the island from the mainland, generally seen in very small herds, in pairs, or alone. Ultimately, all five of the deer species seen on the Isle of Wight are adept swimmers, thus any that are observed may or may not be long-term Island residents. Nonetheless, the island deer (that are present at any given time) tend to remain strategically hidden and are generally thought of as being difficult to spot, even on such a small island. Besides deer, there exists a colony of feral goats on Ventnor's downs.

The Glanville fritillary, a species of butterfly, has a distribution in the United Kingdom largely restricted to the edges of the island's crumbling cliffs.

A competition in 2002 named the pyramidal orchid as the Isle of Wight's county flower.

The occurrence of species and habitats of conservation importance in the island's waters has led to the designation of a suite of marine protected areas seeking to protect these features, including marine conservation zones (MCZs) and special areas of conservation (SACs). The island's marine environment also forms a component of its UNESCO Biosphere Reserve, and is part of the Western English Channel Important Marine Mammal Area (IMMA).

Population pyramid of the Isle of Wight in 2021

=== Settlements ===
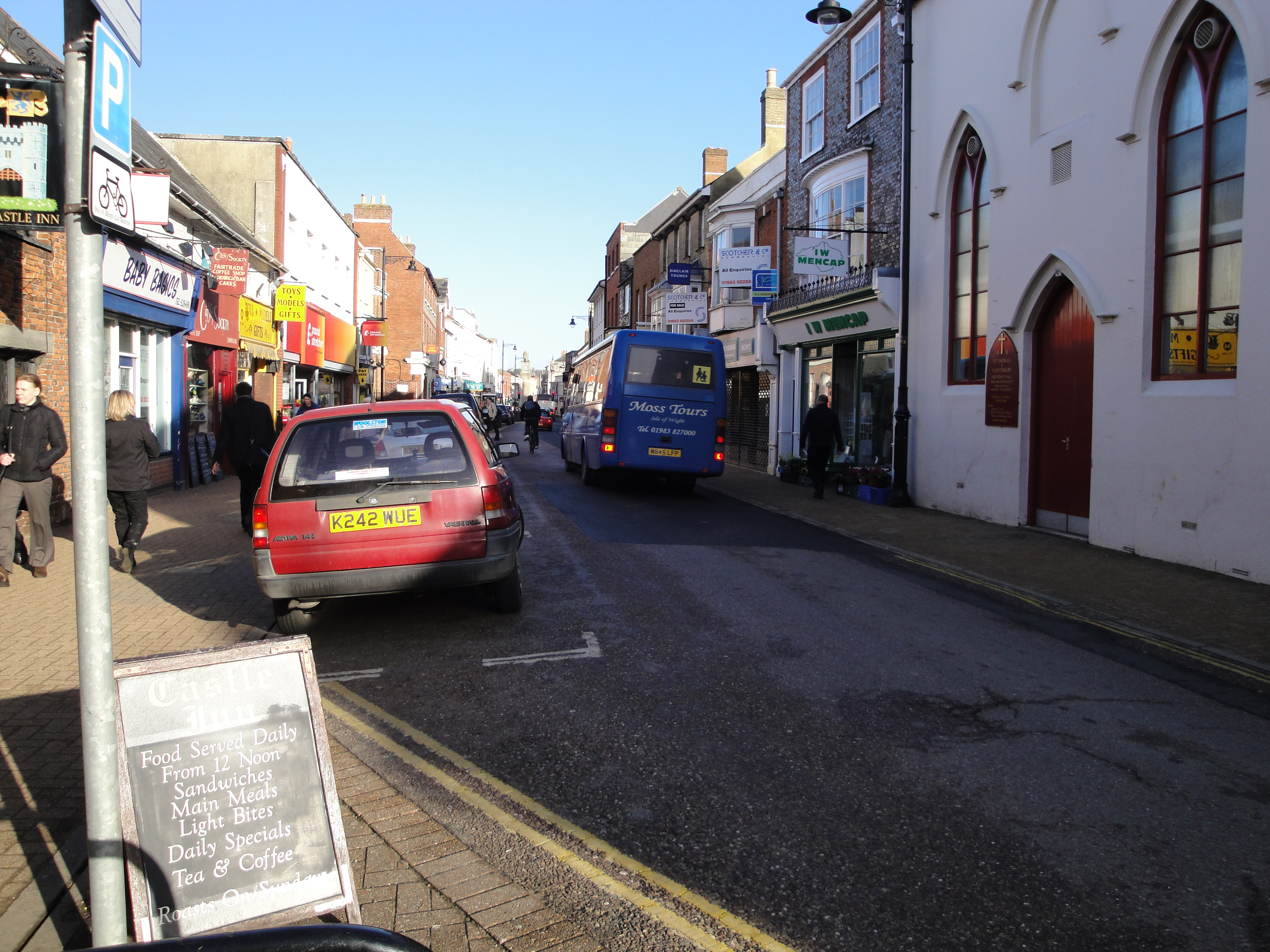
High Street in Newport, the county town

- Newport is the centrally located county town, with a population of about 25,000 and the island's main shopping area. Located next to the River Medina, Newport Quay was a busy port until the mid-19th century.
- Ryde, the largest town with a population of about 30,000, is in the northeast. It is Victorian with the oldest seaside pier in England and miles of sandy and pebble beaches.
- Cowes hosts the annual Cowes Week and is an international sailing centre.
- East Cowes is famous for Osborne House, Norris Castle and as the home from 1929 to 1964 of Saunders-Roe, the historic aircraft, flying boat, rocket and hovercraft company.
- Sandown is a popular seaside resort. It is home to the Wildheart Animal Sanctuary, formerly the Isle of Wight Zoo, the Dinosaur Isle geological museum and one of the island's two 18-hole golf courses.
- Shanklin, just south of Sandown, attracts tourists with its high summer sunshine levels, sandy beaches, Shanklin Chine and the old village.
- Ventnor, built on the steep slopes of St Boniface Down on the south coast of the island, leads down to a bay that attracts many tourists. Ventnor Haven is a small harbour.

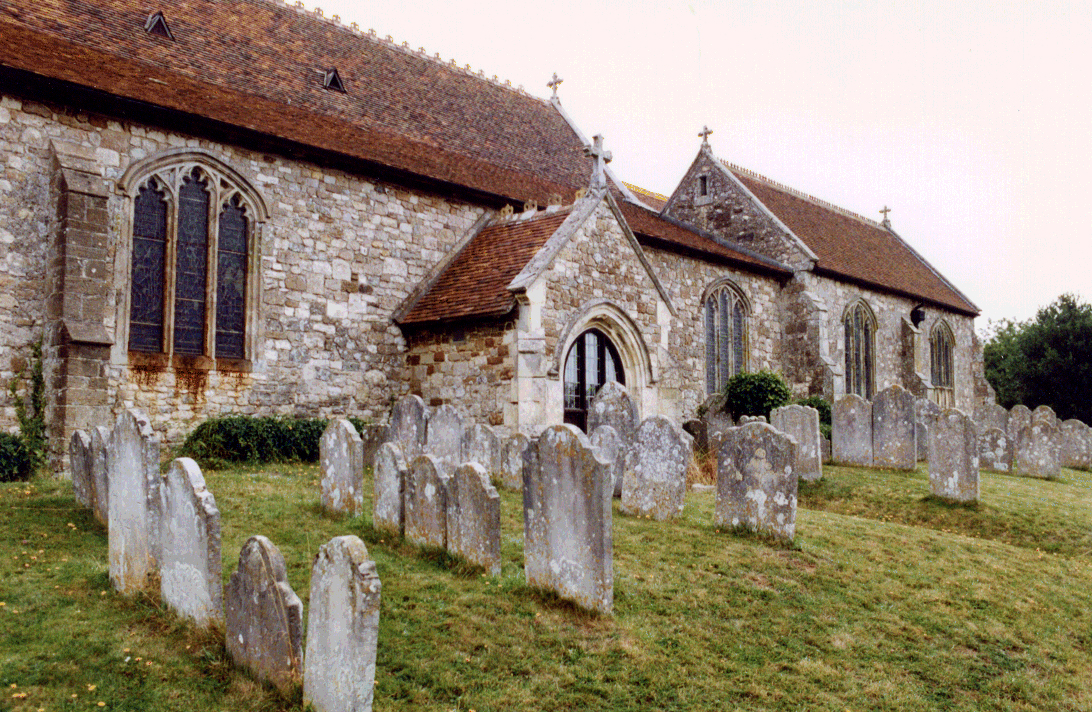
Graveyard in the churchyard in Brading

== Economy ==
=== Socio-economic data ===
The table below shows the regional gross value (in millions of pounds) added by the Isle of Wight economy, at current prices, compiled by the Office for National Statistics.

Regional gross value in millions of pounds sterling
Year	Regional gross value added (Note: Components may not sum to totals due to rounding)	Agriculture (Note: includes hunting and forestry)	Industry (Note: includes energy and construction)	Services (Note: includes financial intermediation services indirectly measured)
1995	831	28	218	585
2000	1,369	27	375	800
2003	1,521	42	288	1,161
2008	2,023			
2012	2,175			

According to the 2011 census, the island's population of 138,625 lives in 61,085 households, giving an average household size of 2.27 people.

41% of households own their home outright and a further 29% own with a mortgage, so in total 70% of households are owned (compared to 68% for South East England).

Compared to South East England, the island has fewer children (19% aged 0–17 compared to 22% for the South East) and more elderly (24% aged 65+ compared to 16% for the South East), giving an average age of 44 years for an island resident compared to 40 in South East England.

=== Industry and agriculture ===
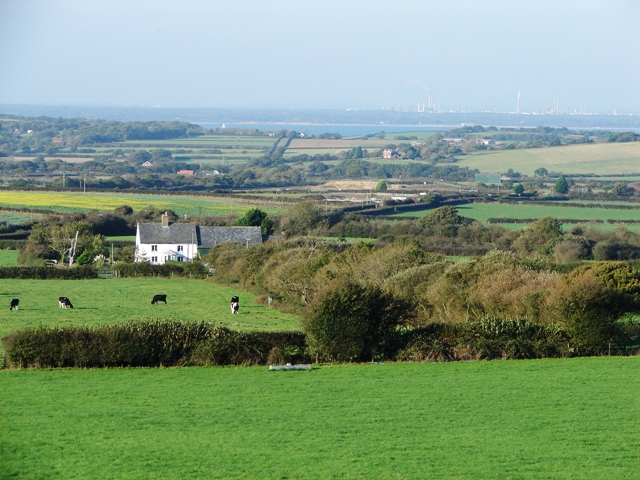
Fields on the island with the coast of Great Britain in the background

The largest industry on the island is tourism, but it also has a significant agriculture including sheep, dairy farming and arable crops. Traditional agricultural commodities are more difficult to market off the island because of transport costs, but local farmers have succeeded in exploiting some specialist markets, with the higher price of such products absorbing the transport costs. One of the most successful agricultural sectors is now the growing of crops under cover, particularly salad crops including tomatoes and cucumbers. The island has a warmer climate and a longer growing season than much of the United Kingdom. Garlic has been grown in Newchurch for many years, and is, in part, exported to France. This has led to the establishment of an annual Garlic Festival at Newchurch, which is one of the largest events of the local calendar.

A favourable climate supports two vineyards, including one of the oldest in the British Isles at Adgestone. Lavender is grown for its oil. The largest agricultural sector has been dairying, but due to low milk prices and strict legislation for UK milk producers, the dairy industry has been in decline: there were nearly 150 producers in the mid-1980s, but now just 24.

Maritime industries, especially the making of sailcloth and boat building, have long been associated with the island, although this has diminished in recent years. GKN operates what began as the British Hovercraft Corporation, a subsidiary of (and known latterly as) Westland Aircraft, although they have reduced the extent of plant and workforce and sold the main site. Previously it had been the independent company Saunders-Roe, one of the island's most notable historic firms that produced many flying boats and the world's first hovercraft.

Another manufacturing activity is in composite materials, used by boat-builders and the wind turbine manufacturer Vestas, which has a wind turbine blade factory and testing facilities in West Medina Mills and East Cowes.

Bembridge Airfield is the home of Britten-Norman, manufacturers of the Islander and Trislander aircraft. This is shortly to become the site of the European assembly line for Cirrus light aircraft. The Norman Aeroplane Company is a smaller aircraft manufacturing company operating in Sandown. There have been three other firms that built planes on the island.

In 2005, Northern Petroleum began exploratory drilling for oil at its Sandhills-2 borehole at Porchfield, but ceased operations in October that year after failing to find significant reserves.

==== Breweries ====
There are three breweries on the island. Goddards Brewery in Ryde opened in 1993. David Yates, who was head brewer of the Island Brewery, started brewing as Yates Brewery at the Inn at St Lawrence in 2000. Ventnor Brewery, which closed in 2009, was the last incarnation of Burt's Brewery, brewing since the 1840s in Ventnor. Until the 1960s most pubs were owned by Mews Brewery, situated in Newport near the old railway station, but it closed and the pubs were taken over by Strong's, and then by Whitbread. By some accounts Mews beer was apt to be rather cloudy and dark. In the 19th century they pioneered the use of screw top cans for export to British India.

=== Services ===
==== Tourism and heritage ====
The island's heritage is a major asset that has for many years supported its tourist economy. Holidays focused on natural heritage, including wildlife and geology, are becoming an alternative to the traditional British seaside holiday, which went into decline in the second half of the 20th century due to the increased affordability of foreign holidays. The island is still an important destination for coach tours from other parts of the United Kingdom.

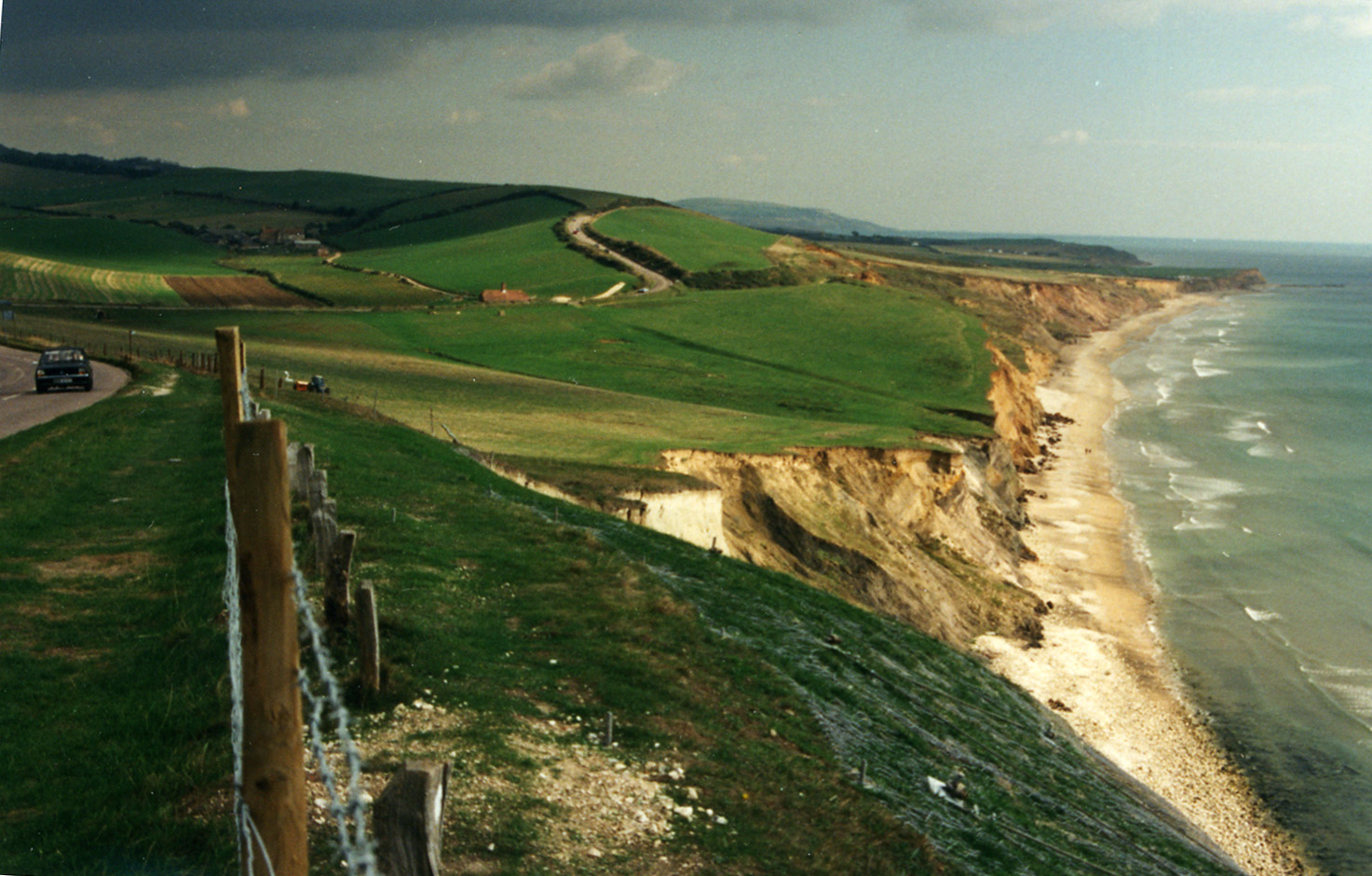
Compton Chine, looking east towards Blackgang

Tourism is still the largest industry, and most island towns and villages offer hotels, hostels and camping sites. In 1999, it hosted 2.7 million visitors, with 1.5 million staying overnight, and 1.2 million day visits; only 150,000 of these were from abroad. Between 1993 and 2000, visits increased at an average rate of 3% per year.

At the turn of the 19th century the island had ten pleasure piers, including two at Ryde and a "chain pier" at Seaview. The Victoria Pier in Cowes succeeded the earlier Royal Pier but was itself removed in 1960. The piers at Ryde, Seaview, Sandown, Shanklin and Ventnor originally served a coastal steamer service that operated from Southsea on the mainland. The piers at Seaview, Shanklin, Ventnor and Alum Bay were all destroyed by various storms during the 20th century; only the railway pier at Ryde and the piers at Sandown, Totland Bay (currently closed to the public) and Yarmouth survive.

Blackgang Chine is the oldest theme park in Britain, opened in 1843. The skeleton of a dead whale that its founder Alexander Dabell found in 1844 is still on display.

As well as its more traditional attractions, the island is often host to walking or cycling holidays through the attractive scenery. An annual walking festival has attracted considerable interest. The 70 miles (113 km) Isle of Wight Coastal Path follows the coastline as far as possible, deviating onto roads where the route along the coast is impassable.

The tourist board for the island is Visit Isle of Wight, a non-profit company. It is the Destination Management Organisation for the Isle of Wight, a public and private sector partnership led by the private sector, and consists of over 1,200 companies, including the ferry operators, the local bus company, rail operator and tourism providers working together to collectively promote the island. Its income is derived from the Wight BID, a business improvement district levy fund.

A major contributor to the local economy is sailing and marine-related tourism.

Summer Camp at Camp Beaumont is an attraction at the old Bembridge School site.

==== Media ====
The main local newspaper purchased is the Isle of Wight County Press. Its circulation has declined over the years, estimated at 11,575 in 2024, especially after it was taken over by Newsquest in July 2017. In 2018 a new free newspaper was launched, the Isle of Wight Observer.

On-line news websites include Island Echo, launched in May 2012, and On the Wight.

The island has a local commercial radio station and a community radio station: commercial station Isle of Wight Radio has broadcast in the medium-wave band since 1990 and on 107.0 MHz (with three smaller transmitters on 102.0 MHz) FM since 1998, as well as streaming on the Internet. Community station Vectis Radio has broadcast online since 2010, and in 2017 started broadcasting on FM 104.6. The station operates from the Riverside Centre in Newport. The island is also covered by a number of local stations on the mainland, including the BBC station BBC Radio Solent broadcast from Southampton. The island's not-for-profit community radio station Angel Radio opened in 2007. Angel Radio began broadcasting on 91.5 MHz from studios in Cowes and a transmitter near Newport.

Important broadcasting infrastructure includes Chillerton Down transmitting station with a mast that is the tallest structure on the island, and Rowridge transmitting station, which broadcasts the main television signal both locally and for most of Hampshire and parts of Dorset and West Sussex.

== Religion ==
The island was a Christian majority region with Christians forming 60.5% in 2011 Census. However it declined to 47.7% in 2021 Census. Correspondingly the proportion of residents claiming “no religion,” rose to 43.9% in 2021, from 29.6% in 2011.

== Culture ==
=== Language and dialect ===
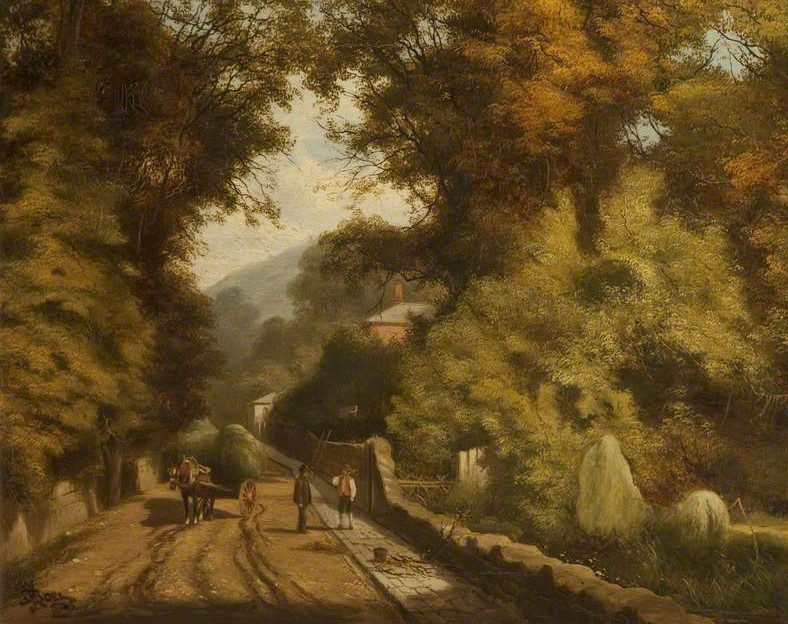
Henry Bates Joel's 1895 artwork 'Bonchurch, near Ventnor, Isle of Wight' is a depiction of rural life on the island. It is exhibited in the Milntown Estate.

The local accent is similar to the traditional dialect of Hampshire, featuring the dropping of some consonants and an emphasis on longer vowels. It is similar to the West Country dialects heard in South West England, but less pronounced.

The island has its own local and regional words. Some, such as nipper/nips (a young male person), are still sometimes used and shared with neighbouring areas of the mainland. A few are unique to the island, for example overner and caulkhead (see below). Others are more obscure and now used mainly for comic emphasis, such as mallishag (meaning "caterpillar"), gurt (meaning "large"), nammit (a mid-morning snack), emmett (meaning "ant") and gallybagger ("scarecrow", and now the name of a local cheese).

=== Identity ===
There remains occasional confusion between the Isle of Wight as a county and its former position within Hampshire. The island was regarded and administered as a part of Hampshire until 1 April 1890, when its distinct identity was recognised with the formation of Isle of Wight County Council (see also Politics of the Isle of Wight). However, it remained a part of Hampshire until the local government reforms of 1974, when it became a full ceremonial county with its own Lord Lieutenant.

The flag of the Isle of Wight

In January 2009, the first general flag for the county was accepted by the Flag Institute.

Island residents are sometimes referred to as "Vectensians", "Vectians" or, if born on the island, "caulkheads". One theory is that this last comes from the once prevalent local industry of caulking or sealing wooden boats; the term became attached to islanders either because they were so employed, or as a derisory term for perceived unintelligent labourers from elsewhere. The term "overner" is used for island residents originating from the mainland (an abbreviated form of "overlander", which is an archaic term for "outsider" still found in parts of Australia).

Residents refer to the island as "The Island", as did Jane Austen in Mansfield Park, and sometimes to the UK mainland as "North Island".

To promote the island's identity and culture, the High Sheriff, Robin Courage, founded an Isle of Wight Day; the first was held on 24 September 2016.

=== Sport ===
Sport plays a key part in the culture of the Isle of Wight. Sports include golf, marathon, cycling and sailing.

The motorcycle speedway team Isle of Wight Warriors compete at the Smallbrook Stadium.

Until their folding in 2016, the ice hockey team Isle of Wight Raiders played at the Ryde Arena. They had a feeder team Vectis Tigers which in turn had a youth feeder team Isle of Wight Wildcats.

In football, the now-disbanded Ryde Sports F.C., founded in 1888, was one of the eight founder members of the Hampshire League in 1896. Currently there are several non-league clubs, the most notable of which are Brading Town, Cowes Sports, East Cowes Vics and Newport IOW. There is also an Isle of Wight Saturday Football League which feeds into the Hampshire League with two divisions and two reserve team leagues.

The island competes in the Island Games, a collection of sports which are hosted and played by small, usually European islands. The Isle of Wight have competed in all editions of the tournament, winning 203 gold medals, 208 silver medals and 220 bronze medals totalling to 631 medals.

=== Music ===
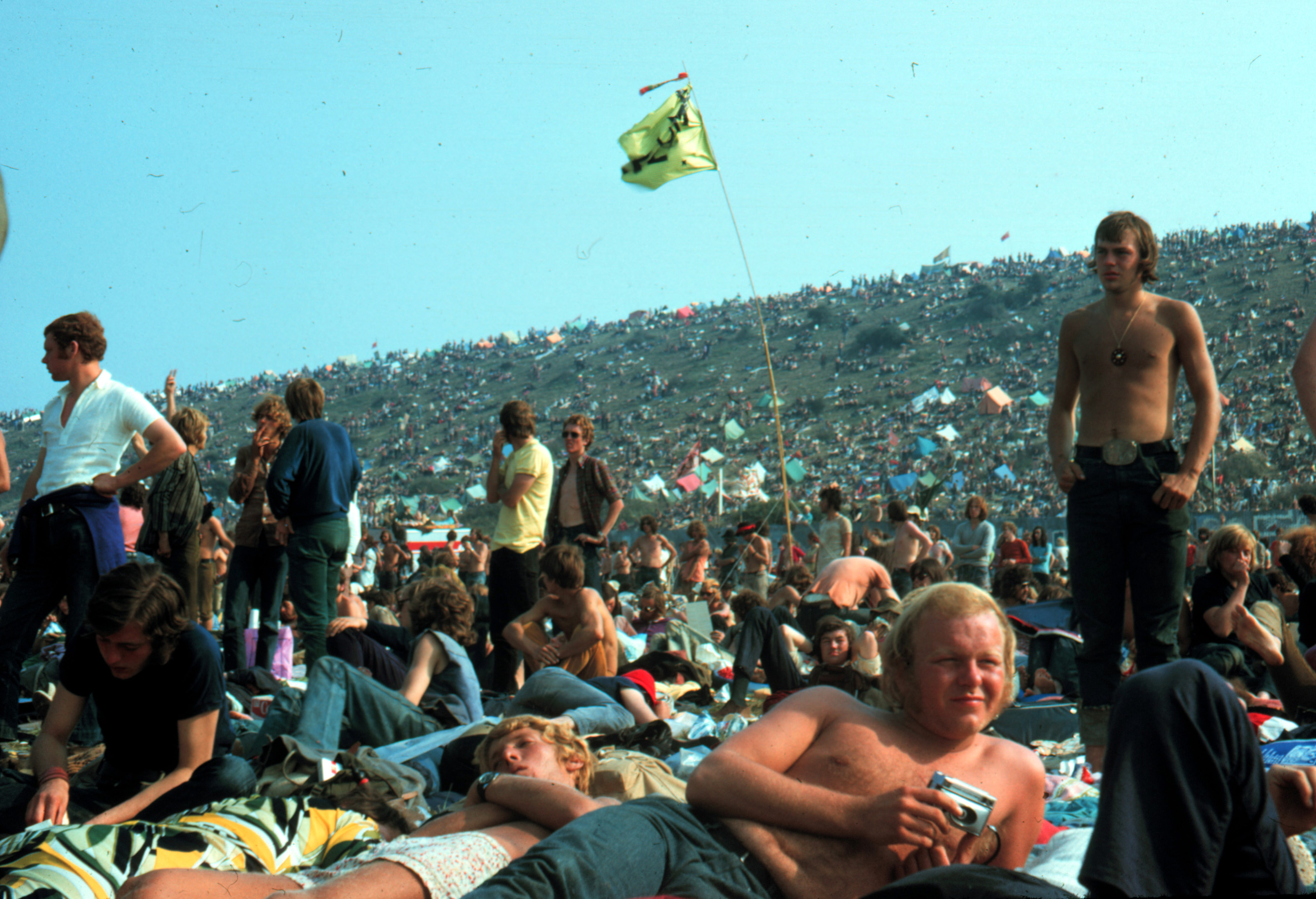
The crowd at the Isle of Wight Festival 1970 is believed to have been 600,000.

The island is home to the Isle of Wight Festival and until 2016, Bestival, before it was relocated to Lulworth Estate in Dorset. In 1970, the festival was headlined by Jimi Hendrix attracting an audience of 600,000, some six times the local population at the time. It is the home of the bands The Bees, Trixie's Big Red Motorbike, Level 42, and Wet Leg.

== Landmarks ==
Key
	Abbey/Priory/Cathedral
Accessible open space	Accessible open space
	Amusement/Theme Park
	Castle
Country Park	Country Park
	English Heritage
	Forestry Commission
Heritage railway	Heritage railway
Historic house	Historic House
Places of Worship	Places of Worship
Museum (free) Museum	Museum (free/not free)
National Trust	National Trust
	Theatre
	Zoo

- Alum Bay
- Appuldurcombe House
- Amazon World Zoo
- Bembridge Lifeboat Station
- Blackgang Chine
- Brading Roman Villa
- Carisbrooke Castle
- Classic Boat Museum, East Cowes
- Compton Bay
- Dimbola Lodge
- Dinosaur Isle
- Fort Victoria
- Godshill village and model village
- Isle of Wight Bus & Coach Museum
- Isle of Wight Steam Railway
- Isle of Wight Zoo, Yaverland
- Medina Theatre
- The Needles
- Newport Roman Villa
- Osborne House
- Quarr Abbey
- Robin Hill
- Botanic Gardens, Ventnor
- Yarmouth Castle

== Transport ==
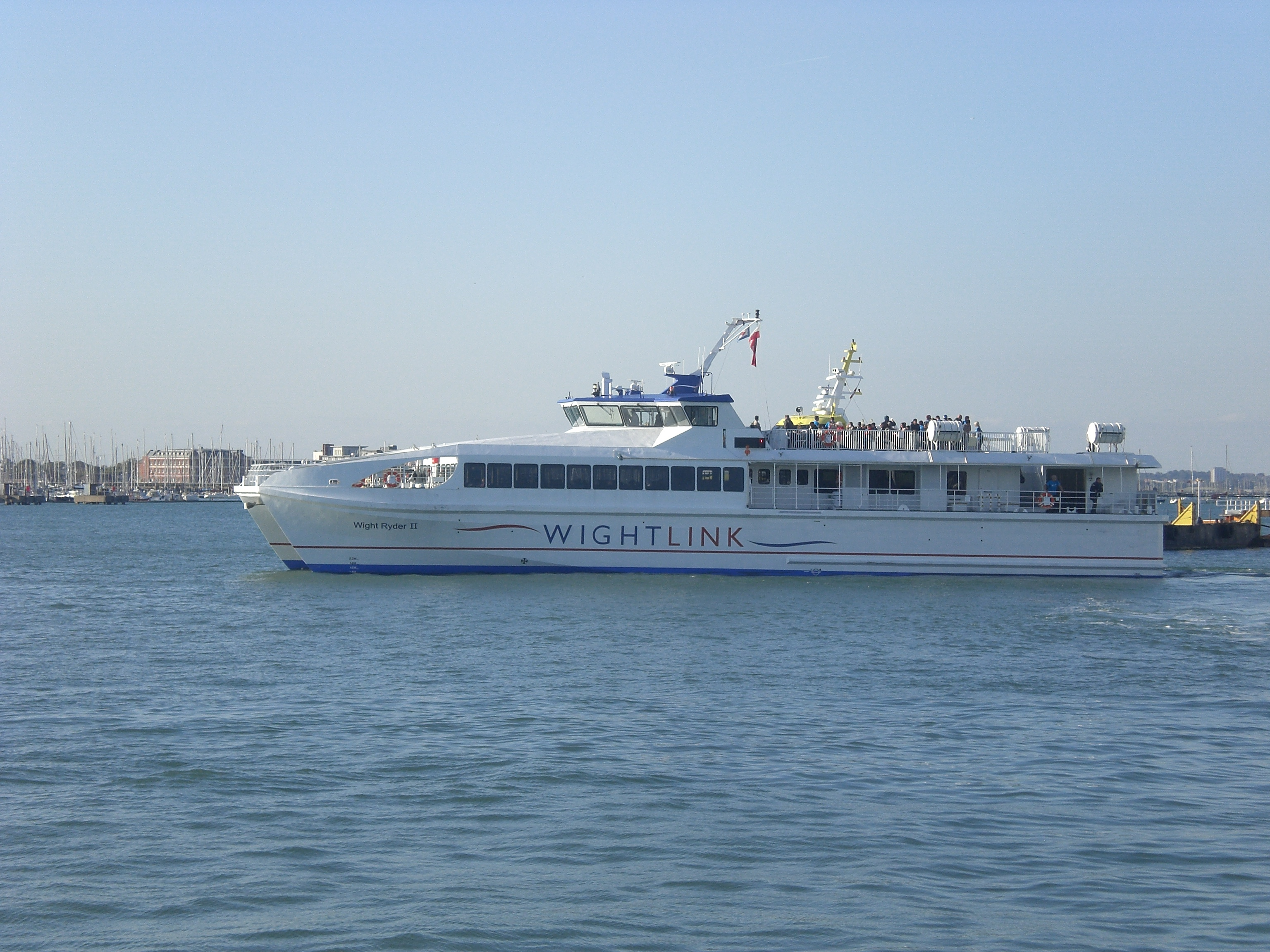
One of the Wightlink FastCats which provide a high-speed ferry service between Portsmouth and Ryde

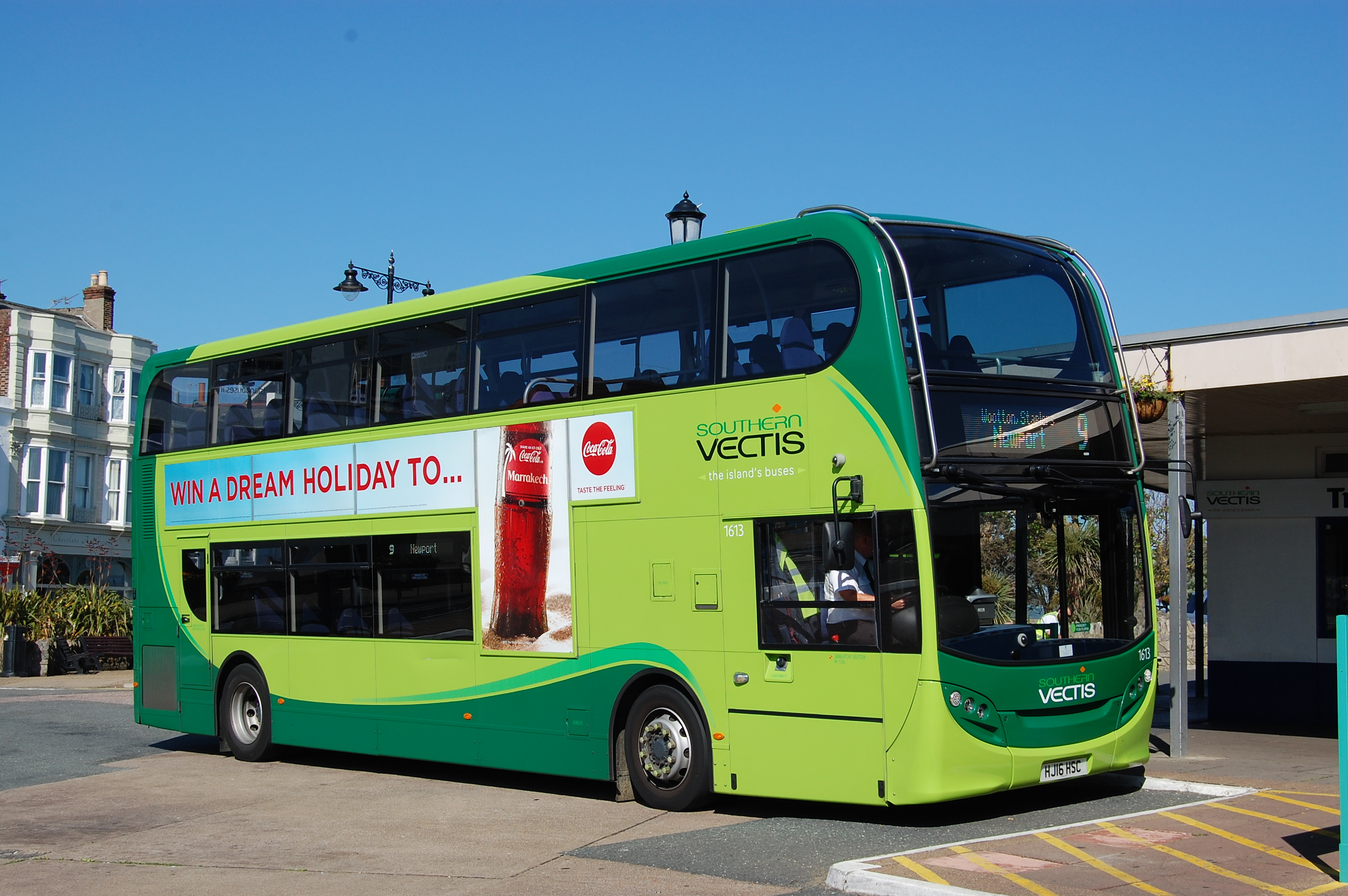
A Southern Vectis Alexander Dennis Enviro400

The Isle of Wight has 550 miles (885 km) of roadway. It does not have a motorway, although there is a short stretch of dual carriageway towards the north of Newport near the hospital and prison.

A comprehensive bus network operated by Southern Vectis links most settlements, with Newport as its central hub.

Journeys away from the island involve a ferry journey. Car ferry and passenger catamaran services are run by Wightlink and Red Funnel, and a hovercraft passenger service (the only such remaining in the world) by Hovertravel.

The island formerly had its own railway network of over 55 miles (89 km), but only one line remains in regular use. The Island Line is part of the United Kingdom's National Rail network, running a little under 9 miles (14 km) from Shanklin to Ryde Pier Head, where there is a connecting ferry service to Portsmouth Harbour station on the mainland network. The line was opened by the Isle of Wight Railway in 1864, and from 1996 to 2007 was run by the smallest train operating company on the network, Island Line Trains. It is notable for utilising old ex-London Underground rolling stock, due to the small size of its tunnels and unmodernised signalling. Branching off the Island Line at Smallbrook Junction is the heritage Isle of Wight Steam Railway, which runs for 5 1/2 miles (8.9 km) to the outskirts of Wootton on the former line to Newport.

There are two airfields for general aviation, Isle of Wight Airport at Sandown and Bembridge Airport.

The island has over 200 miles (322 km) of cycleways, many of which can be enjoyed off-road. The principal trails are:

- The Sunshine Trail, which is a circular route linking Sandown, Shanklin, Godshill, and Wroxall of 12 miles (19 km);
- The Red Squirrel Trail, a track between Cowes and Sandown that is 32 miles (51 km) in total;
- The Round the Island Cycle Route of 62 miles (100 km).

== Prisons ==
The Isle of Wight is near the densely populated south of England, yet separated from the mainland. This position led to it hosting three prisons: Albany, Camp Hill and Parkhurst, all located outside Newport near the main road to Cowes. Albany and Parkhurst were among the few Category A prisons in the UK until they were downgraded in the 1990s. The downgrading of Parkhurst was precipitated by a major escape: three prisoners (two murderers and a blackmailer) escaped from the prison on 3 January 1995 for four days, before being recaptured. Parkhurst enjoyed notoriety as one of the toughest jails in the United Kingdom, and housed many notable inmates including the Yorkshire Ripper Peter Sutcliffe, New Zealand drug lord Terry Clark and the Kray twins.

Camp Hill is located adjacent but to the west of Albany and Parkhurst, on the very edge of Parkhurst Forest, having been converted first to a borstal and later to a Category C prison. It was built on the site of an army camp (both Albany and Parkhurst were barracks); there is a small estate of tree-lined roads with the former officers' quarters (now privately owned) to the south and east. Camp Hill closed as a prison in March 2013.

The management of all three prisons was merged into a single administration, under HMP Isle of Wight in April 2009.

== Education ==
There are 69 local education authority-maintained schools on the Isle of Wight, and two independent schools. As a rural community, many of these are small and with fewer pupils than in urban areas. The Isle of Wight College is located on the outskirts of Newport.

From September 2010, there was a transition period from the three-tier system of primary, middle and high schools to the two-tier system that is usual in England. Some schools have now closed, such as Chale C.E. Primary. Others have become "federated", such as Brading C.E. Primary and St Helen's Primary. Christ the King College started as two "middle schools", Trinity Middle School and Archbishop King Catholic Middle School, but has now been converted into a dual-faith secondary school and sixth form.

Since September 2011 five new secondary schools, with an age range of 11 to 18 years, replaced the island's high schools (as a part of the previous three-tier system).

== Notable people ==
Notable residents have included:

=== 17th century and earlier ===
- King Arwald, last pagan king in England
- King Charles I of England, who was imprisoned at Carisbrooke Castle
- Earl Tostig Godwinson, who supported Norwegian king Harald Hardrada's invasion
- Actor, highwayman and conspirator Cardell "Scum" Goodman
- Soldier and regicide of Charles I Thomas Harrison, imprisoned at Carisbrooke with John Rogers and Christopher Feake
- Soldier Peter de Heyno
- Philosopher and polymath Robert Hooke
- Murderer Michal Morey

=== 18th century ===
- Marine painter Thomas Buttersworth
- Explorer Anthony Henday
- Radical journalist John Wilkes

=== 19th century ===
- Queen Victoria and Prince Albert (monarch and consort), who built and lived at Osborne House
- Photographer Julia Margaret Cameron, who lived at Dimbola Lodge
- Irish Republican Thomas Clarke
- Naval captain Jeremiah Coghlan, who retired to Ryde
- Writer Charles Dickens
- Novelist Gertrude Fenton
- Poet Gerard Manley Hopkins
- Poet John Keats
- Inventor and radio pioneer Guglielmo Marconi
- Philosopher Karl Marx, who stayed at 1, St. Boniface Gardens, Ventnor
- Religious writer and hymnwriter Mary Fawler Maude
- Poet and hymnwriter Albert Midlane
- Geologist and engineer John Milne
- Regency architect John Nash
- Novelist Harriet Parr
- Early Hong Kong Government administrator William Pedder
- Economist Arthur Cecil Pigou
- New Zealand PM Henry Sewell
- Poet Algernon Charles Swinburne
- Poet Alfred Tennyson
- Writer and poet Louisa Murray

=== 20th century onwards ===
- Scriptwriter Raymond Allen
- Concert organist E. Power Biggs
- Darts player Keegan Brown
- Singer Helen Clare
- Singer-songwriter Sarah Close
- Inventor of the hovercraft Sir Christopher Cockerell
- Presenter and actor Ray Cokes
- Actress Bella Emberg
- Yachtsman Uffa Fox
- Actor Marius Goring
- Musician Jack Green
- Survival expert and Chief Scout Bear Grylls
- Actress Sheila Hancock
- Actor Melvyn Hayes
- Singer-songwriter Lauran Hibberd
- Folk-rock musician Robyn Hitchcock
- Actor Geoffrey Hughes
- Conspiracy theorist David Icke
- Actor Jeremy Irons
- Comedian Phill Jupitus
- Actor Laura Michelle Kelly
- Composer Albert Ketèlbey
- Iranian poet Mimi Khalvati
- Musician Mark King
- Band Level 42
- Yachtswoman Ellen MacArthur
- BBC Tonight presenter Cliff Michelmore
- Film director Anthony Minghella
- Actor David Niven
- YouTuber Adam Pacitti
- Cyclist Kieran Page
- Professor of biochemistry Samuel Victor Perry
- Musician Frederick Riddle
- Performance artist Nigel Rolfe
- Heptathlete Kelly Sotherton
- Gardener and presenter Alan Titchmarsh
- Novelist Edward Upward
- Band Wet Leg
- Band Grade 2

== Overseas names ==
The Isle of Wight has given names to many parts of former colonies, most notably Isle of Wight County in Virginia founded by settlers from the island in the 17th century. Its county seat is a town named Isle of Wight.

Other notable examples include:

- Isle of Wight – an island off Maryland, United States
- Dunnose Head, West Falkland
- Ventnor, Cowes on Phillip Island, Victoria, Australia
- Carisbrook, Victoria, Australia
- Carisbrook, a former stadium in Dunedin, New Zealand
- Ryde, New South Wales, Australia
- Shanklin, Sandown, New Hampshire, United States
- Ventnor City, New Jersey, United States
- Gardiners Island, New York, United States shown as "Isle of Wight" on some of the older maps.

== Cultural references ==
=== Film ===
- The film Something to Hide (1972; US title: Shattered), starring Peter Finch, was filmed near Cowes.
- The British film That'll Be the Day (1973), starring David Essex and Ringo Starr, included scenes shot in Ryde (notably Cross Street), Sandown (school), Shanklin (beach) and Wootton Bridge (fairground).
- Mrs Brown (1997), with Dame Judi Dench and Billy Connolly, was filmed at Osborne House and Chale.
- The film Fragile (2005), starring Calista Flockhart, is based on the Isle of Wight.
- Victoria and Abdul (2017) starring Dame Judi Dench and Ali Fazal, began shooting principal photography at Osborne House in September 2016.

=== Games ===
- John Worsley's Commodore 64 game Spirit of the Stones was set on the Isle of Wight.

=== Music ===
- The Beatles' song "When I'm Sixty-Four" (1967), credited to Lennon-McCartney and sung by Paul McCartney, refers to renting a cottage on the island.
- The Italian pop-band Dik Dik's single L'Isola di Wight (1970), which uses the island as a metaphor for youthful freedom and travel.

=== Television ===
- Survivors, the BBC's 1970s post-apocalyptic sci-fi drama set after a worldwide pandemic kills off most of humanity, features an episode in which 500 survivors holed up in London are to be relocated to the Isle of Wight. Though referred to many times in the Series 2 episode "Lights of London – Part 2", the move itself is not shown (nor any footage of the island).
- ITV's dramatisation of Dennis Potter's work Blade on the Feather (19 October 1980) was filmed on the island.
- A 2002 Top Gear feature showed an Aston Martin being driven around Cowes, East Cowes, and along the Military Road and seawall at Freshwater Bay.
- The setting for Free Rein was based on the Isle of Wight.
- Portions of the 2021 drama series It's a Sin on Channel 4 were supposedly set in the Isle of Wight, the home of one of the lead characters, although they were actually filmed in Rhos-on-Sea and Bangor in north Wales.
- The sitcom The Cockfields is set on the Isle of Wight.

=== Novels ===
Julian Barnes' novel England, England broaches the idea of replicating England in a theme park on the Isle of Wight.

== See also ==
- High Sheriff of the Isle of Wight
- Isle of Wight gasification facility
- Isle of Wight NHS Trust
- Isle of Wight Rifles
- List of civil parishes on the Isle of Wight
- List of current places of worship on the Isle of Wight
- List of governors of the Isle of Wight
- List of hills of the Isle of Wight
- List of Isle of Wight bands
- List of places on the Isle of Wight
- Lord Lieutenant of the Isle of Wight
- Yaverland Battery

== Sources ==
=== Books ===
- Reaney, P. H. (1969). The Origin of English Place Names. Routledge & Kegan Paul.
- Ekwall, Eilert (1960). The Concise Oxford Dictionary of English Place-Names, 4th ed. Oxford University Press.
- Clark Hall, John R. (1916). A Concise Anglo−Saxon Dictionary, Second Edition. The Macmillan Company.
