= Isle of Wight Wildcats =

Youth ice hockey team from Ryde, England

The Isle of Wight Wildcats was a Youth (Under 18) ice hockey team based in Ryde on the Isle of Wight, and coached by Justin Attrill. They were sponsored by Wightlink and played in the second-tier of the South under-18 youth ice hockey league (formally an under 19 league). The Wildcats were a source for the Wightlink Raiders and the Vectis Tigers to find junior talent, if needed. The Wildcats won the Southern B League in 2001 and gained promotion to the Southern A League, but were relegated the very next year.

Many former Wildcats played in the ENIHL for the Vectis Tigers due to the change in age groups of British hockey from under 19s to under 18s.
