= History of the Isle of Wight =

Island south of the Solent

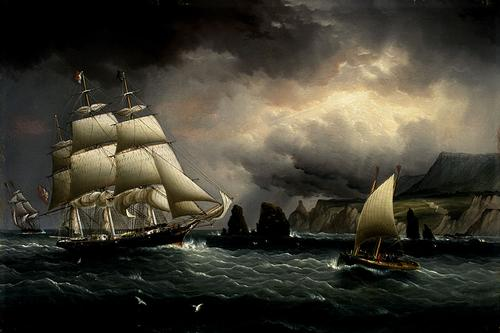
The Clipper Ship "Flying Cloud" off the Needles, Isle of Wight, by James E. Buttersworth, 1859-60.

The Isle of Wight is rich in historical and archaeological sites, from prehistoric fossil beds with dinosaur remains, to dwellings and artefacts dating back to the Bronze Age, Iron Age, and Roman periods.

== Formation ==
The River Solent was the largest tributary of the Channel River that drained the Hampshire Basin from the Early Pleistocene or late Pliocene. During the Mesolithic period, sea levels in northern Europe were some 30 to 40 metres lower than today, and the land that became Britain was a peninsula of northern Europe. The island was formed at the end of the last Ice Age, about 8–9000 years ago, as sea levels rose, and the land of southern Britain sunk due to the post-glacial rebound of the north that had been under the ice. This flooded the former river valley of the Solent to the north, and the future English Channel to the south, and cut Wight off from the island of Britain. Once open to the sea, tidal scouring widened the Solent.

== Early history ==
=== Prehistory ===
The first inhabitants are assumed to have been hunter-gatherers migrating by land during the Paleolithic (Old Stone Age) period, as the ice age began to recede and the climate improved. The island has no visible Paleolithic or Mesolithic (Middle Stone Age) sites, but flints from these periods have been found and are on display at Carisbrooke Castle.

=== Neolithic ===
There are theories that, during the Neolithic era, Bouldnor was a seaport that traded with the Middle East, or that nomadic gatherers roamed over wider areas than previously thought, because wheat was present there 8,000 years ago, hundreds if not thousands of years before it is known to have been grown in northern Europe.

The Longstone near Mottistone (the standing stone on the hill later becoming an Anglo-Saxon meeting place, this 'moot-stone' giving name to the nearby settlement) is one of the only three surviving Neolithic (New Stone Age) sites, along with a long barrow on Afton Down and a 'mortuary enclosure' on Tennyson Down.

=== Bronze Age ===
Between the Neolithic and Roman eras, Southeastern Britain experienced significant migration from the continent. Finds of late Late Iron Age coins, such as the South Wight and Shalfleet Hoards, suggest trading links both with nearby tribes and further afield. The coins and ingots from these hoards had been defaced before burial, for reasons that are unknown; this feature has only been found in coin finds from Hampshire and Wight. The variety of origin of the coins found locally is more marked than elsewhere in Britain and suggests that the island may have had a degree of political separation.

The island has over 240 bronze age burial mounds or round barrows, nearly all on the chalk downs. One plough-damaged barrow on Gallibury Down was excavated during 1979-80 and dated to between 1600-1400 BCE. There is also evidence from aerial photographs of ring ditches (the remains of barrows) on the limestone near Bembridge. The only significant Iron Age find is at Chillerton Down, where there was a hill fort. However three of the Roman villa sites have also produced late Iron Age pottery, which suggests a continuity of occupation.

Bronze Age Britain had large reserves of tin from mining in Cornwall and Devon. Tin is necessary to alloy with copper to produce bronze. At that time the sea level was much lower, and so tin for export could be brought across the Solent at low tide on carts, or possibly on boats such as those found at Ferriby. A shortage of tin during the Bronze Age collapse and trade disruptions in the Mediterranean around 1300 BCE may have forced metalworkers to seek an alternative to bronze.

=== Etymology ===
It has been suggested that a 1st century BCE reference to Ίκτιν (Ictin) by the Graeco-Sicilian Diodorus Siculus might refer to the Isle of Wight, although St. Michael's Mount in Cornwall is now considered more likely. A century later, Pliny the Elder uses its Latin name Vectis and in the mid-2nd century Ptolemy confirms the position of Vectis as "...below Magnus Portus" (probably the port near Bosham). The Roman historian Suetonius calls the island insula Vecta in his account of its capture in year 43, referring to the future emperor Vespasian, who "proceeded to Britain where he fought thirty battles, subjugated two warlike tribes, and captured more than twenty towns, besides the entire Isle of Vectis".

The form Vectis seems reasonably robust but Rivet and Smith were uncertain of its etymology. A gloss on an 1164 manuscript of Nennius equates Old English wiht with Latin divorcium, which has encouraged writers to think that the island sits like a lever (Latin vectis) between the two arms of the Solent. The word could be Brittonic, from a Celtic root akin to Irish fecht 'journey' and Welsh gwaith 'work'. A detailed study in 2010 draws attention to the Proto-Germanic word *wextiz, which would have been Vectis in Latin, and survives in various modern-language forms, including Modern English whit 'something small' (English wight is considered a revival from Middle English), German Wicht 'dwarf, imp', Dutch wicht 'little girl' and Norwegian vette 'being, creature (especially supernatural)'. This might suggest that the meaning is something like 'daughter island' or 'little companion'; however if Germanic languages were not widely spoken in Britain during the Roman era, as has been the consensus, then they would be an unlikely source for the Latin Vectis. However more recently it has been argued that the inhabitants of southern Britain at this time may indeed have been Germanic, rather than Celtic, which could re-open the possibility of the island's name having Germanic roots.

Wight appears at least 5 times in medieval Irish sources.

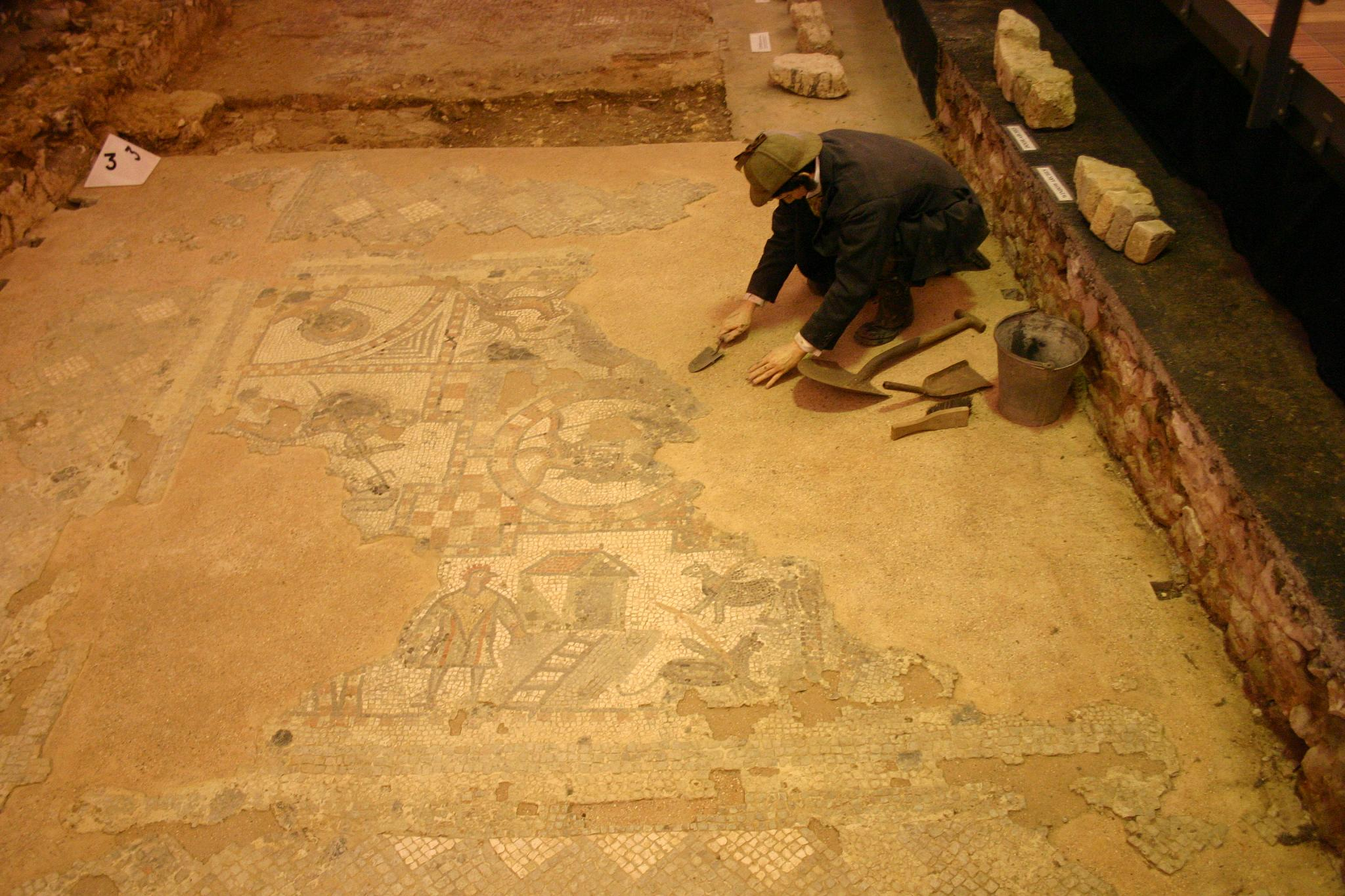
Roman mosaic at Brading Roman Villa

=== Roman era ===
The Romans occupied southern Britain, including the Isle of Wight, for nearly four hundred years. The Romans built no towns on the island, but it became an agricultural centre, and at least seven Roman villas are known. The Roman villas at Newport and Brading have been excavated and are open to the public. When fully developed around AD 300, Brading was probably the largest on the Island, being a courtyard villa with impressive mosaics, suggesting a good income was being made from the agricultural produce of the island.

At Brading Villa a field system can be seen near Brading Down; the remains associated with the villa can be seen as low banks. The chalk downland was cultivated in prehistoric and Roman times because the light chalk soil was not too difficult to plough. It is very likely indeed that the Romans grew vines, as the climate was then warmer than it is now, and on this basis nearby Adgestone Vineyard claims to be the oldest in Britain.

By the late fourth or early fifth centuries AD, Roman troops and officials had withdrawn from Britain.

=== Jutish kingdom ===
In Bede's ecclesiastical history, Vecta, along with parts of Hampshire and most of Kent, was settled by Jutes.

According to the Anglo-Saxon Chronicle, Cerdic and his son Cynric conquered the island in 530. The Chronicle states that after Cerdic died in 534, the island was given to his nephews Stuf and Wihtgar, who were said to be of Jutish and Gothic origin. The two brothers were said to have set about exterminating the native Britons of Wight, either killing them or driving them into exile. However, it is uncertain whether "Wihtgar", who is believed to have died in 544, was a real person or came from a misunderstood place name. The "Men of Wight" were known as "Wihtwara". Carisbrooke was known as the "Fort of the Men of Wight" ("Wihtwarasburgh"), or alternatively the fort may have been named after Wihtgar.

It is believed that the island became a Jutish kingdom ruled by King Stuf and his successors, until 661 when it was invaded by Wulfhere of Mercia and forcibly converted to Christianity. When he returned to Mercia the island reverted to paganism. Arwald was its last Jutish King and the last pagan king in Anglo-Saxon England until the Vikings.

Bede describes the invasion of the island in 686 (noting that Bede was writing fifty years later, and some of his dates are considered approximate) by Caedwalla, a Wessex King. He writes: "After Caedwalla had obtained possession of the kingdom of the Gewissae, he took also the Isle of Wight, which till then was entirely given over to idolatry, and by merciless slaughter, endeavoured to destroy all the inhabitants thereof, and to place in their stead people from his own province; binding himself by a vow, though it is said that he was not yet regenerated in Christ, to give the fourth part of the land and of the spoil to the Lord, if he took the Island. He fulfilled this vow by giving the same for the service of the Lord to Bishop Wilfrid...". Arwald died in action, and his nephews were betrayed to Caedwalla and executed. Bede adds that 300 "hides" (each being the land that could support a family) were given to the Church.

Little archaeological evidence of this period survives. The main sites are cemeteries at Chessell Down and Bowcombe Down, both excavated in the nineteenth century to produce skeletons, iron swords, knives, and jewellery such as brooches and buckles. The biggest brooches are in the British Museum but some swords, parts of shields, small brooches and buckles are retained in the county archaeological centre.

=== The Saxon period and the Vikings ===
From about 685-686 the island can be considered part of Wessex, and after the West Saxon kings ruled all England, then part of England.

The Anglo Saxon Chronicle tells how Wiht-land suffered from Viking raids: "And then another time they lay in the Isle of Wight, and meanwhile ate out of Hampshire and of Sussex". Alfred the Great's navy defeated the Danes in 871 after they had "ravaged Devon and the Isle of Wight".

Around 900 the kingdom was divided into shires, and the island became part of the shire of Hampshire.

During the second wave of Viking attacks in the reign of Ethelred the Unready (975-1014) the island was often used by them as a temporary winter base, when they were unable to shelter with their 'cousins' in Normandy.

In 1002 Ethelred ordered the killing of all Danes in England, in the St. Brice's Day Massacre. From 1003 onwards, Sweyn Forkbeard raided England, which may partly have been to avenge the massacre.

Also in 1002 Ethelred had married the Norman princess Emma, and then persuaded the Normans not to give the Vikings shelter. Thereafter they were more regular visitors to the island. In 1006 the Chronicle records: "when it drew near to winter, the army travelled home, and after Martinmas the raiding-army came to its secure base on the Isle of Wight and there provided themselves everywhere whatever they needed", and then records raids that they made from there into southern England.

In 1013 Sweyn began a more concerted invasion, and Ethelred was forced to flee to the island: "And then at midwinter the King turned from the fleet to the Isle of Wight, and was there for the season; and after the season turned across the sea to Richard [of Normandy], and was there until the happy event of Swein's death occurred.".

After Ethelred himself died, England came under Danish rule, and the island continued to be a base for their fleets as recorded by the Chronicle in 1022: "Here King Cnut went out with his ships to Wight."

After England returned to an English king, occasional Viking raids continued; in 1048 the Chronicle records: "a great earth-tremor widely in England. And in the same year Sandwich and Wight were raided, and the best men that were there were killed; and King Edward [the Confessor] and the earls went out after them in their ships". The Viking practice of sub-dividing the kingdom amongst powerful Earls had survived their departure, and Wessex came under the control of Earl Godwin, and then his son Harold Godwinson, the future King Harold.

During the war of succession in 1066, the island was used as a base by various contenders. Firstly "came Earl Tostig from beyond the sea into Wight, and with as great a fleet as he could get, and there was given both money and provisions; and then went from there, and did harm everywhere along the sea-cost he could get to" and later his brother Harold Godwinson "...went into Wight, and lay there all the summer and the autumn; and a land army was kept everywhere by the sea, although in the end it was to no avail". Both men had manors on the island - Harold at Kern and Tostig at Nunwell.

== The Norman Conquest ==
After the Battle of Hastings in 1066, the Isle of Wight and the rest of England entered the Norman era. The island would not again be invaded by a foreign nation for another 479 years.

In the Domesday book of 1086 the Island's name is "Wit". William the Conqueror gave its manorial rights to his kinsman William FitzOsbern, who became Lord of the Isle of Wight. Carisbrooke Priory and the fort of Carisbrooke Castle were founded (probably the site had previously been fortified, originally by Romans and subsequently by Jutes or Saxons; there are remains of a late Saxon wall or burgh as defence against Viking raiders). Thereafter allegiance on the island was sworn to FitzOsbern as 'Lord' rather than the king, a role subsequently granted to the de Redvers family by Henry I after his succession in 1100.

For nearly 200 years, 1100-1293, the island was a semi-independent feudal fiefdom, with the de Redvers family ruling from Carisbrooke. The final private owner was the Norman Countess Isabella de Fortibus, who inherited it aged 25 after her brother died suddenly. She ruled for thirty years, during which time all of her children died. On her deathbed in 1293 she was persuaded to sell the island to Edward I, and so it came under control of the English crown.

Newtown was laid out by a Bishop of Winchester and his ecclesiastical estate at Swainston, and granted Borough status in 1256. It did not prosper, partly because it was in competition with the existing ports of Yarmouth, Newport and Southampton, and partly because of the extensive damage it later suffered during French raids (especially in 1377).

Newport was laid out in the late 12th Century as the 'new port' for Carisbrooke Castle, the town designed on a grid system, unusual for its time.

Notable surviving monuments from this period include the 11th century church of St. Boniface at Bonchurch, the 12th century church at Yaverland, and the Norman entrance arch (now to the churchyard) at Binstead.

== Medieval period ==
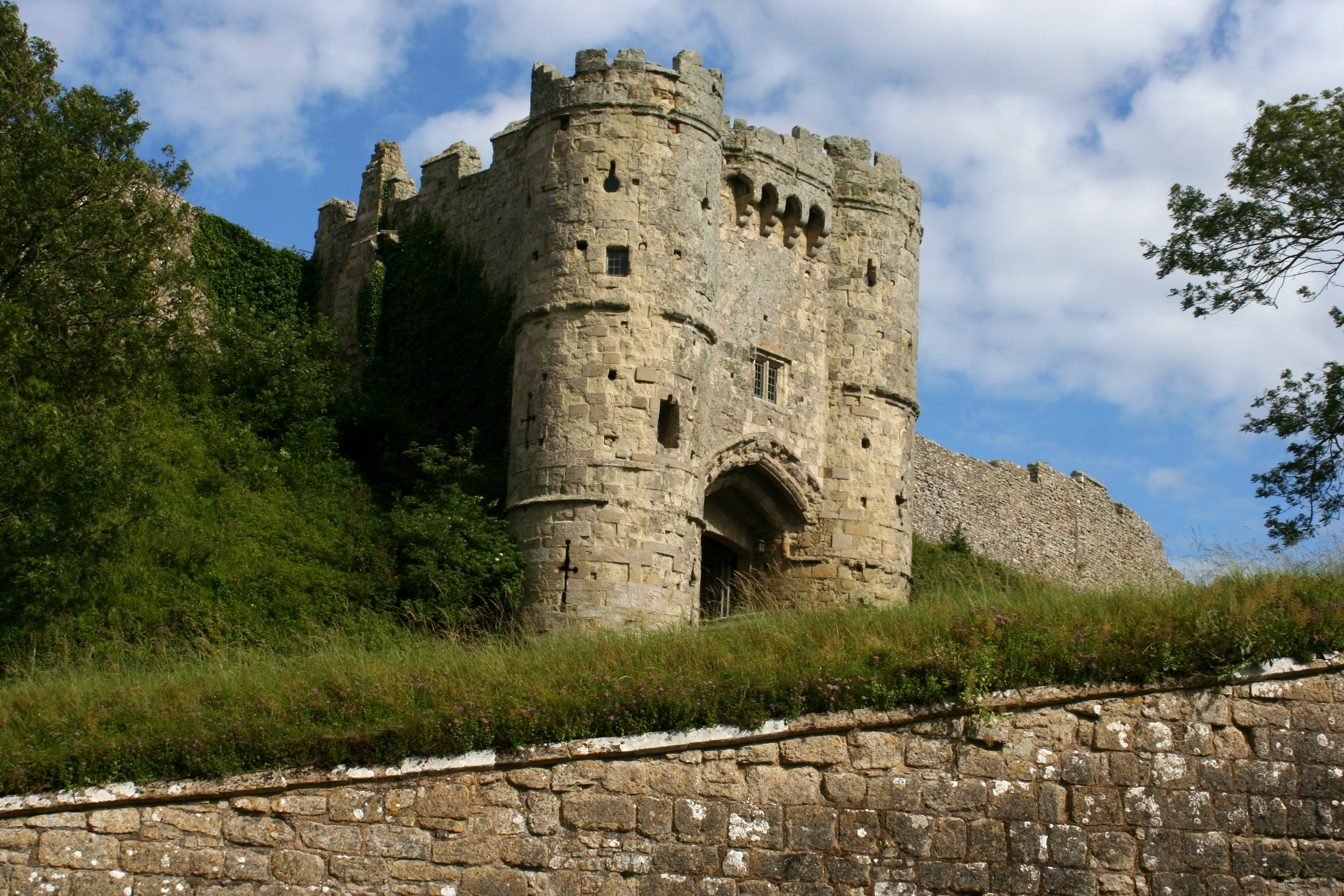
15th century gatehouse of Carisbrooke Castle

On 22 April 1313 the ship St. Marie was wrecked in Chale Bay, its cargo of wine plundered by local landowners. This led to the construction of St. Catherine's Oratory by Walter de Godeton, the Lord of Chale, as penance for the crime.

In 1374, the fleet of the Crown of Castile, led by Fernando Sánchez de Tovar, sacked and burned the island.

In 1377 French raiders attacked and burned several towns, including Newtown, and laid siege to Carisbrooke Castle. Peter de Heynoe, Lord of Stenbury, is said to have killed the French commander with a crossbow shot aimed through an arrow slit still visible in the castle's west wall.

The island continued to be governed by a Lordship, but this was now a royal appointment (the position evolving over the years into a Captaincy and eventually a Governorship). It is sometimes said there was a brief interruption in 1444 when Henry Beauchamp was crowned King of the Isle of Wight, with King Henry VI placing the crown on his head; the regal title supposedly expired when he died heirless in 1446. But there little evidence to support this story.

Henry VIII developed the Royal Navy and its permanent base at Portsmouth, and ordered fortifications to be built at Yarmouth, Cowes, East Cowes and Sandown, sometimes using stone from the dissolved monasteries.

== 16th century ==
The French invaded the island on 21 July 1545. English ships engaged the French navy; two days earlier, the Mary Rose had sunk, apparently without damage. Sir Richard Worsley, Captain of the Island, commanded the local militia who resisted the attack, after French troops landed on the southern coast intending to use the island as a base against the mainland. However, the local militia defeated the French troops at the Battle of Bonchurch (although one account claims the French were successful at Bonchurch but defeated at Bembridge).

In 1587 two Catholic missionaries Anderton and Marsden, originally from Lancashire but trained in France, returned to England in disguise, heading for Dover. However, due to a gale their ship landed in Cowes. Fellow passengers had overheard them praying and they were reported on arrival to Governor Carey, taken to London for trial, then executed by hanging, drawing and quartering in Cowes. They were declared "venerable" by Pope Pius XI.

On 23 July 1588 some of the decisive action in the naval battle against the Spanish Armada took place within sight of the island, off Portland. Afterwards the threat of Spanish attacks remained, and the outer fortifications of Carisbrooke Castle were built between 1597 and 1602.

In the late 16th century the bubonic plague arrived in Newport. God's Providence House is traditionally the only house in the town where no-one died.

Three of Queen Elizabeth I's most influential courtiers came from Newport: Dr Edes, her chaplain, Dr James, her doctor, and Thomas Fleming, who became Lord Chief Justice and presided over the trial of Guy Fawkes in 1606.

== 17th and 18th centuries ==
Towards the end of the English Civil War in November 1647, Charles I rode out from London to avoid capture by the army, hoping to escape to Jersey. He became lost in the New Forest, missed the intended ship, and so fled to the Isle of Wight. But its Governor Colonel Robert Hammond had already declared for Parliament, and so he imprisoned Charles in Carisbrooke Castle.

The king made several failed attempts to escape, one time famously getting stuck in a castle window. He also had letters smuggled out, most of which were intercepted, which he signed 'J' to disguise his identity (donkeys operating the castle's water-well have subsequently been given names beginning with 'J'). In September 1648 he discussed the Treaty of Newport with the Presbyterian faction of Parliament, which would have granted him a constitutional monarchy. However, he had no intention of accepting its restrictions, and so also conspired for the Scots to invade England on his behalf. This led to his eventual execution on 30 January 1649.

In 1669, Sir Robert Holmes became governor, and re-organised the island's defences. Yarmouth's castle was reduced in size, and he built a house for himself alongside, now the George Hotel. His position as the local vice-admiral entitled him to two-thirds of the value of any prizes captured in home waters, and he preyed enthusiastically on foreign ships that happened to sail nearby. On one of his raids he captured a part-completed statue of the French king, and had a likeness of his own head attached instead.

During the Seven Years' War, the island was used as a staging post for British troops departing on expeditions against the French coast, such as the Raid on Rochefort. During 1759, with a planned French invasion imminent, a large force of soldiers was stationed there. The French called off their invasion following the Battle of Quiberon Bay.

== Early 19th century ==
The famous boat-building firm of J. Samuel White was established on the Island in 1802. Other noteworthy marine manufacturers followed over the 19th and 20th centuries including Saunders-Roe a key manufacturer of the Flying-boats and the world's first hovercraft. The tradition of maritime industry continues on the Island today.

The famous Regency architect John Nash lived on the island, and designed Newport's Guidhall, completed in 1816. It now houses the island's history museum.

== Victorian era ==
In the 1860s, what remains in real terms the most expensive ever government spending project saw fortifications built on the island and in the Solent, as well as elsewhere along the south coast, including the Palmerston Forts, The Needles Batteries and Fort Victoria, because of fears about the strength of the French and their possible invasion.

Queen Victoria spent childhood holidays on the island and became fond of it. When Queen she made Osborne House her winter home, and so the island became a fashionable holiday resort for many Victorians, including Alfred, Lord Tennyson, Julia Margaret Cameron, and Charles Dickens (who wrote much of David Copperfield there), as well as the French painter Berthe Morisot and members of European royalty (many of whom were family relations). Until then, the island had been rural, with most people employed in farming, fishing or boat-building. The boom in tourism, spurred by growing wealth and leisure time, and by Victoria's example, led to significant urban development of the island's coastal resorts; the island saw significant expansion as many new homes and hotels were built.

Queen Victoria died at Osborne House on 22 January 1901, aged 81.

During her reign, the world's first radio station was set up by Marconi in 1897 at the Needles Battery, at the western tip of the island. In 1898 the first paid telegram (called a 'Marconigram' at the time) was sent from this station, and the island is now the home of the National Wireless Museum, near Ryde.

== Modern history ==
In the mid- to late-nineteenth century, a sizeable network of railways was built on the island, notable for its punishing gradients and numerous tunnels, particularly to reach the town of Ventnor. Since the early twentieth century, these lines were often linked to plans for a tunnel under the Solent, an idea still talked of today. Most of the rail network closed between 1956 and 1966, and is now a series of cyclepaths.

During the Second World War the island was frequently bombed. With its proximity to German-occupied France, the island had a number of observation stations and transmitters, as well as the RAF radar station at Ventnor. It was the starting-point for one of the earlier Operation Pluto pipelines to feed fuel to Europe after the Normandy landings. One of the most dramatic incidents on the Isle of Wight during the war came on the night of 4-5 May 1942, in which the Polish destroyer ORP Błyskawica successfully defended the towns of Cowes and East Cowes from a detachment of German bombers. Shortly before D-Day Auxiliary Units were deployed to the island for two weeks as a precaution against counter-attacks.

The Needles Battery was used to develop and test the Black Arrow and Black Knight space rockets, which were subsequently launched from Woomera, Australia.

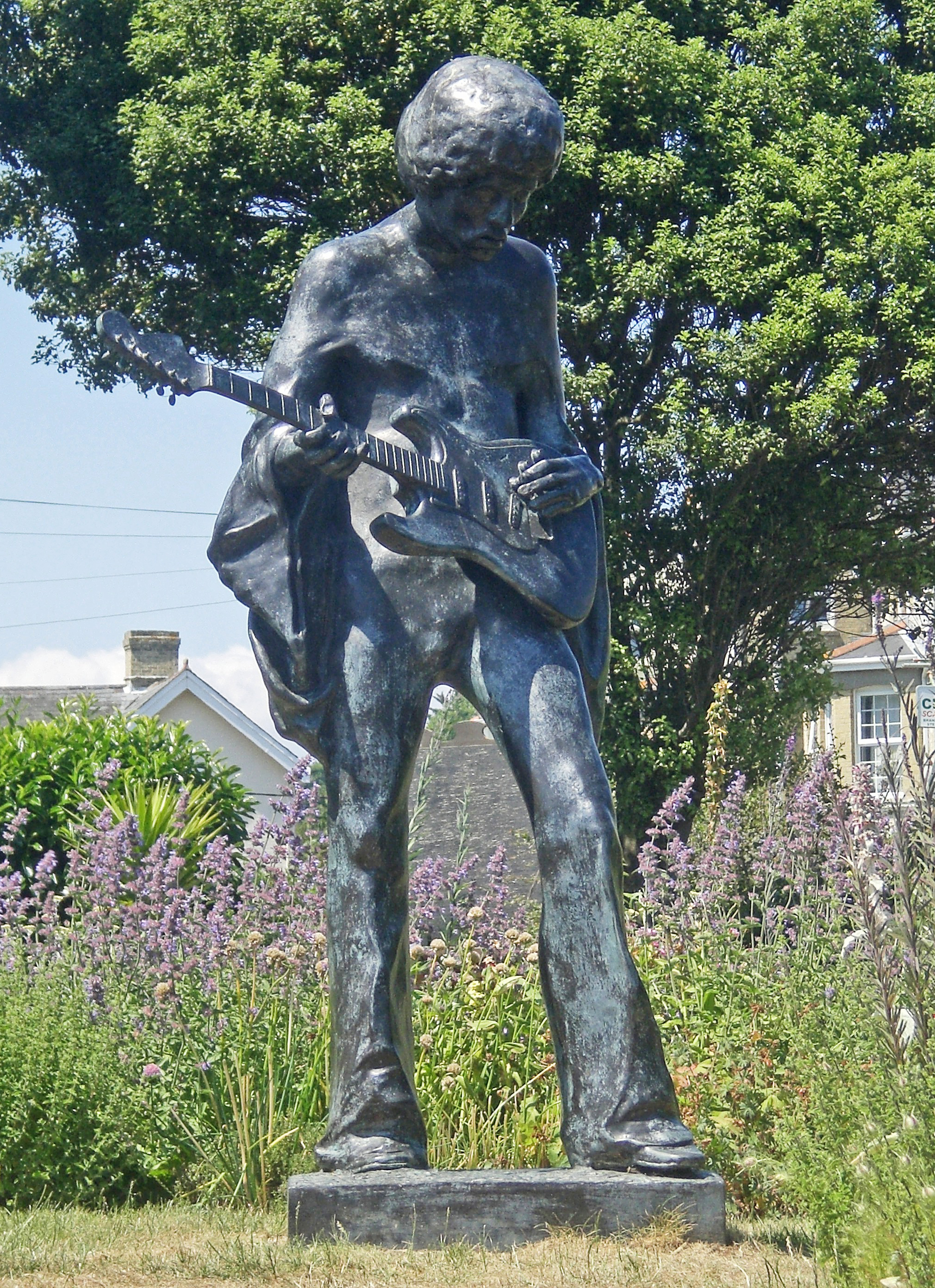
Statue of Jimi Hendrix outside Dimbola Lodge

The Isle of Wight Festival was a very large rock festival that took place near Afton Down, West Wight in 1970, following two smaller concerts in 1968 and 1969. The 1970 show was notable both as one of the last public performances by Jimi Hendrix and for the number of attendees, reaching by some estimates 600,000. The festival was revived in 2002 in a different format, and is now an annual event.

The first Governor to hold the crown representative title used now of Lord-Lieutenant was Lord Mountbatten of Burma until his murder in 1979. Lord Mottistone was the last Lord Lieutenant to also hold the title Governor (from 1992 to 1995). Since 1995 there has been no Governor appointed and Mr Christopher Bland has been the Lord Lieutenant.

== Political history ==
The island's most ancient borough was Newtown on the large natural harbour on the island's north-western coast. A French raid in 1377, which destroyed much of the town as well as other Island settlements, sealed its permanent decline. By the middle of the 16th century, it was a small settlement long eclipsed by the more easily defended town of Newport. Elizabeth I breathed some life into the town by awarding two parliamentary seats but this ultimately made it one of the most notorious of the Rotten Boroughs. By the time of the Great Reform Act that abolished the seats, it had just fourteen houses and twenty-three voters. The Act also disenfranchised the borough of Yarmouth and replaced the four lost seats with the first MP for the whole Isle of Wight; Newport also retained its two MPs, though these were reduced to one in 1868 and eventually abolished completely in 1885.

Often thought of as part of Hampshire, the Isle of Wight was briefly included in that county when the first county councils were created in 1888. However, a "Home Rule" campaign led to a separate county council being established for the Isle of Wight in 1890, and it has remained separate ever since. Like inhabitants of many islands, Islanders are fiercely jealous of their real (or perceived) independence, and confusion over the Island's separate status is a perennial source of friction.

It was planned to merge the county back into Hampshire as a district in the 1974 local government reform, but a last minute change led to it retaining its county council. However, since there was no provision made in the Local Government Act 1972 for unitary authorities, the Island had to retain a two-tier structure, with a county council and two boroughs, Medina and South Wight.

The borough councils were merged with the county council on 1 April 1995, to form a single unitary authority, the Isle of Wight Council. The only significant present-day administrative link with Hampshire is the police service, the Hampshire Constabulary, which is joint between Hampshire and the Isle of Wight.

From the closing decades of the 20th century onwards, there has been considerable debate on the Island over whether or not a bridge or tunnel should connect the island with mainland England. The Isle of Wight Party campaigned from a positive position, although extensive public debate on the subject revealed a strong body of opinion amongst islanders against such a proposal. In 2002 the Isle of Wight Council debated the issue and made a policy statement against the proposal.

== See also ==
- History of England
- Isle of Wight Rifles
- Isle of Wight Festival 1970
- Notable residents of the Isle of Wight
