= Yarbridge =

Coordinates: 50°40′24″N 1°08′33″W

- Hamlet
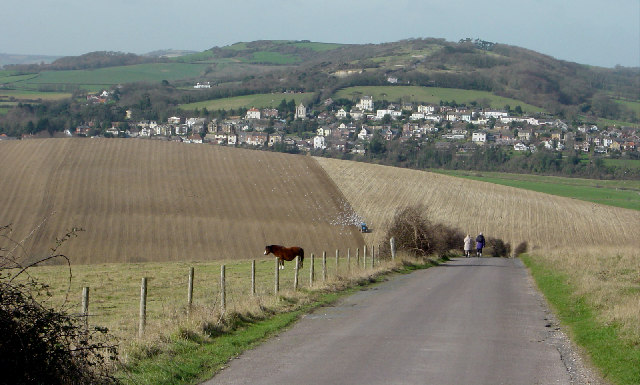
- Yarbridge, as seen from Bembridge Down
- Civil parish: Brading
- Unitary authority: Isle of Wight
- Ceremonial county: Isle of Wight
- Region: South East
- Country: England
- Sovereign state: United Kingdom
- Post town: SANDOWN
- Postcode district: PO36
- Dialling code: 01983
- Police: Hampshire and Isle of Wight
- Fire: Hampshire and Isle of Wight
- Ambulance: Isle of Wight
- UK Parliament: Isle of Wight East

Yarbridge (also called Yarbridge Cross) is a village on the Isle of Wight, England. It is at the southern tip of the parish of Brading (where the 2011 census population was listed).

The bridge over the River Yar, defended by a Second World War pillbox, was constructed in the Middle Ages by Sir Theobald Russell who was killed fighting a French invasion, dying of his wounds at Knighton Gorges. Until the bridge's construction, Bembridge had been an island accessible only at low tide. The bridge also crosses the railway and is bordered by an RSPB reserve on Brading Marshes.

Brading Roman Villa and Morton Manor are close by.
