= William Scott (English cricketer, born 1903) =

English cricketer

Personal information
- Full name: William Ernest Newnham Scott
- Born: 31 May 1903; Binstead, Isle of Wight, England
- Died: 6 August 1989 (aged 86); Newport, Isle of Wight, England
- Batting: Right-handed
- Bowling: Right-arm off break

Domestic team information
- Years: Team
- 1927: Hampshire

Career statistics
Competition	First-class
Matches	5
Runs scored	102
Batting average	20.40
100s/50s	–/–
Top score	35
Balls bowled	192
Wickets	4
Bowling average	32.75
5 wickets in innings	–
10 wickets in match	–
Best bowling	2/66
Catches/stumpings	–/–
- Source: Cricinfo, 14 February 2010

William Ernest Newnham Scott (31 May 1903 — 6 August 1989) was an English first-class cricketer.

Scott was born on the Isle of Wight at Binstead in May 1903. He was invited to trial for Hampshire in 1925, though a hand injury that season prevented him from playing. He later made his debut for Hampshire against Essex at Southampton in the 1927 County Championship, with Scott making five appearances for Hampshire during that season. He scored 102 runs in his five appearances for Hampshire, at an average of 20.40 and a highest score of 35. With his off break bowling, he took 4 wickets with best figures of 2 for 66. At the end of that season, Scott was offered a professional contract by Hampshire. He decided against accepting the contract offer, preferring the security afforded to him through his employment with the Midland Bank at Shanklin. He continued to play cricket at club level.

Scott died at Newport on the Isle of Wight in August 1989. His obituary in Wisden asserted that at the time of his death he was the only man born on the island to play first-class cricket; however, this assertion is incorrect as Percy Bird, Herbert Griffiths, Henry Jolliffe, Howard Phillips, Hamilton Smith, Frederick Trumble, Walter Wheeler, and Sir Matthew Wood were all born on the island and played first-class cricket before Scott.
