= Hardley Manor =

Hardley Manor (also Hardelei, 11th century; Hardeleghe, 13th century) was a manor house in the parish of Brading on the Isle of Wight.

== History ==
Hardley belonged in 1086 to William son of Stur, and had previously been held by Godric as a free manor of the Confessor. At the end of the 13th century it was held of the honour of Carisbrooke Castle by Robert de Glamorgan of Wolverton, and it passed with that manor (q.v.) until about the middle of the 15th century. Later it became part of Bembridge Farm, and lost its identity, the name being retained only in a field belonging to the farm.
