= Wode Manor =

Wode Manor (also La Wode, 13th-14th centuries; Wode, 15th-16th centuries) was a manor house in the parish of Brading on the Isle of Wight.

== History ==
Wode, probably the northern wooded portion of the peninsula, seems to have been a member of the manor of East Standen, and passed with it until the death of Nicholas Glamorgan about 1362–3. It then seems to have been divided, part going with Standen to the Bramshotts and Howles, and the rest with Wolverton to the Hakets and Gilberts. The former moiety is not mentioned after 1480; the latter apparently followed the same descent as Wolverton. The name is now lost, and the manor is apparently merged in Bembridge Farm.
