= Morton, Isle of Wight =

Suburb of Brading, Isle of Wight, United Kingdom

Coordinates: 50.6735°N 1.1479°W

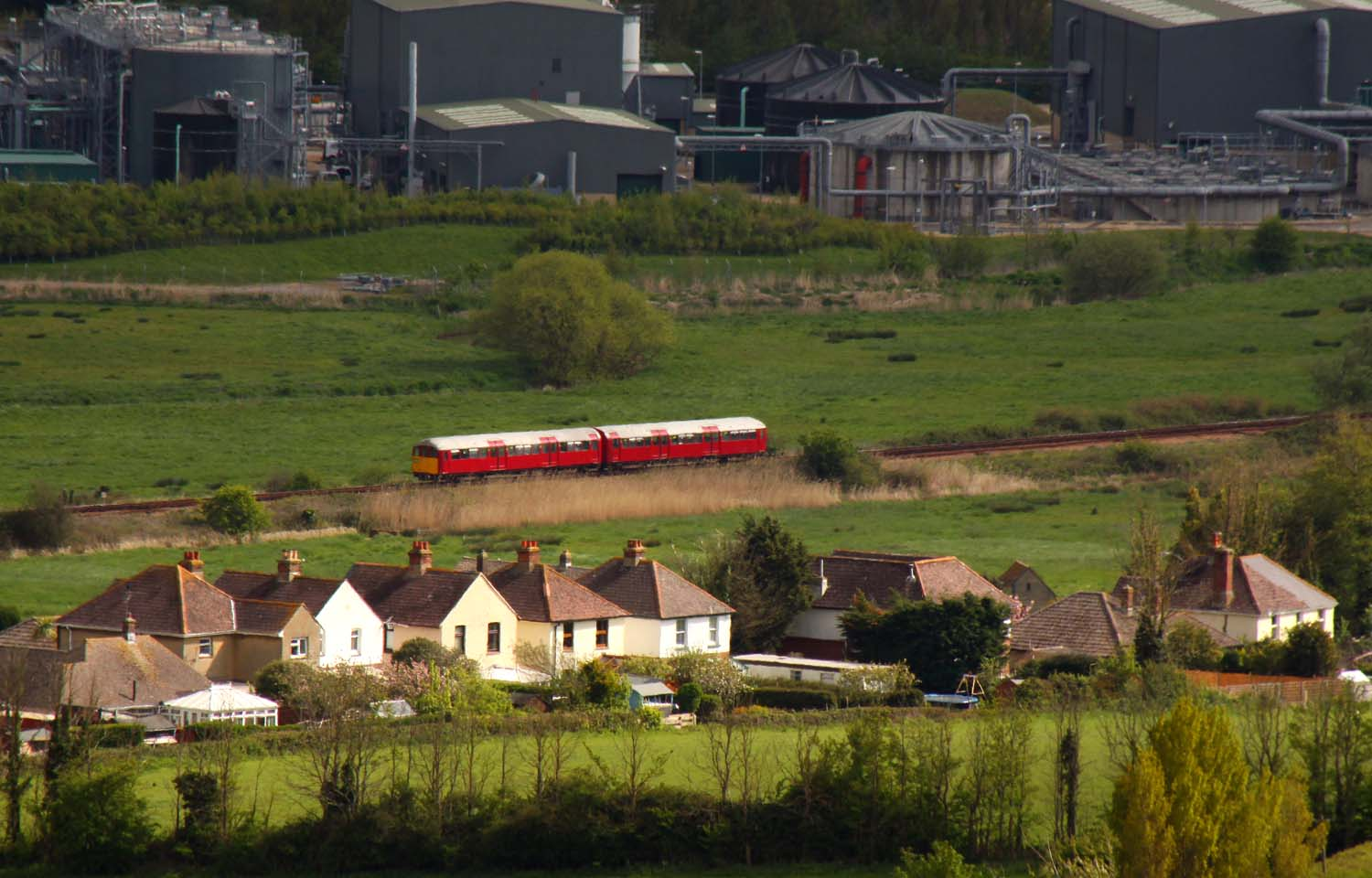
Railway at Morton

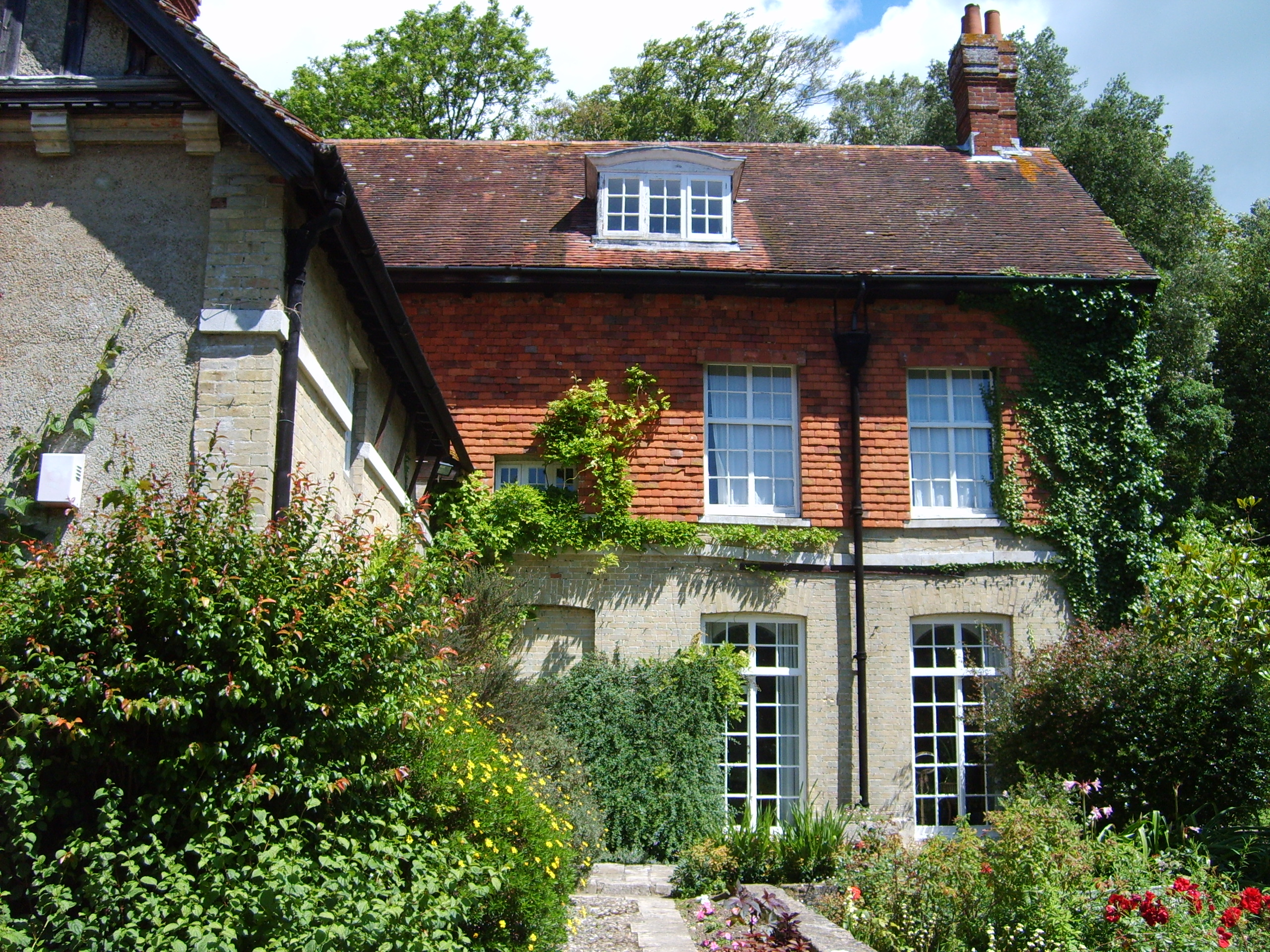
Morton Manor

On the Isle of Wight, Morton is the area of Brading where Morton Marshes and the River Yar form a boundary to the extension of housing estates from Sandown.

Morton is distinguished by hawthorn hedges. It is the site of some Roman ruins.
