= Old Town Hall, Brading =

Municipal building in Brading, Isle of Wight, England

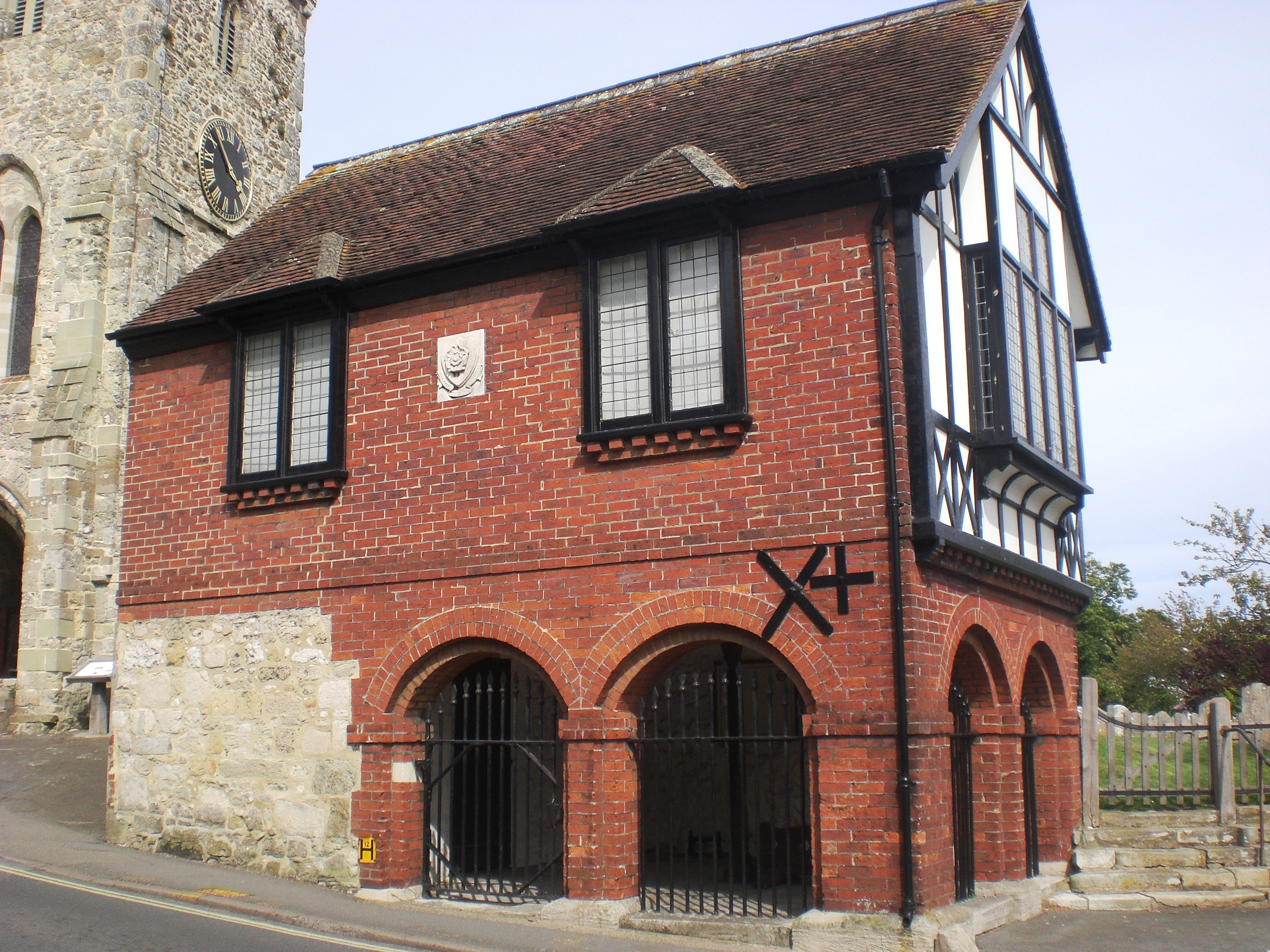
- Old Town Hall, Brading

- Shown on the Isle of Wight
- 50.6822°N 1.1430°W
- Location: High Street, Brading

History
- Built: 1730

Site notes
- Architectural style: Neoclassical style

Listed Building – Grade II
- Official name: The Old Town Hall including lock up, stocks and whipping post, High Street
- Designated: 18 January 1967
- Reference no.: 1219522

The Old Town Hall is a municipal building in the High Street, Brading, Isle of Wight, England. The structure, which is now used to store and exhibit a collection of artefacts and records, is a Grade II listed building.

== History ==
The building was designed in the neoclassical style, built in red brick and was completed in around 1730. The design involved an asymmetrical main frontage of three bays facing onto the High Street. The ground floor was arcaded so that markets could be held: the first bay on the left was infilled with rubble masonry to create a lock-up for the incarceration of petty criminals, while the other two bays contained round headed openings with voussoirs and iron gates. The first floor, which was used as an assembly room, was originally timber framed with diagonal tension braces to support the structure.

In 1819, a new chest was acquired to store the important civic documents which included royal charter signed by Edward VI. By the 1840s, the assembly room was being used as a school room, but, by the early 1860s, the building had become very dilapidated and was disused. The building was remodelled in 1876, with the timber framing on the first floor being replaced by a red brick structure and a prominent four-part, slightly projecting, Tudor Revival style window being installed at the south end. The main frontage was fenestrated by two bi-partite casement windows.

The borough council, which had met in the town hall, was abolished under the Municipal Corporations Act 1883. The assets of the borough council, including the old town hall, were transferred to the newly created Brading Town Trust in 1898. The building was subsequently converted for use as a free library.

A new town hall at the south end of the High Street was opened in February 1903. Meanwhile, the old town hall continued to be used to store the town stocks and whipping post as well as a collection of artefacts and records, together with the original weights and measures. Following the completion of an extensive programme of refurbishment works, the old town hall was re-opened on 8 April 2022.
