= Holy Cross Church, Binstead =

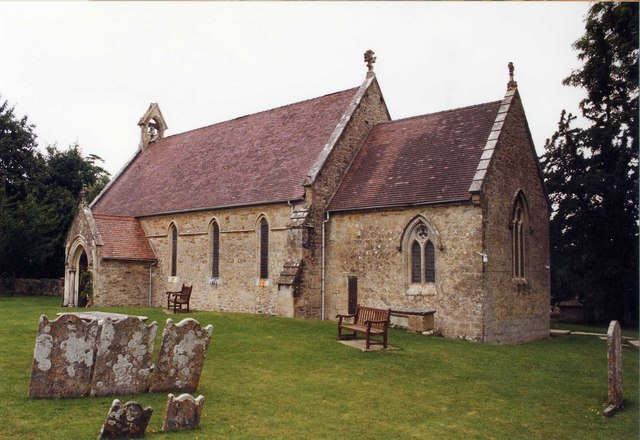
- Holy Cross Church, Binstead
- 50°43′35″N 01°11′19″W
- Denomination: Church of England
- Churchmanship: Broad Church

History
- Dedication: Holy Cross

Administration
- Province: Canterbury
- Diocese: Portsmouth
- Parish: Binstead

Holy Cross Church, Binstead is a parish church in the Church of England located in Binstead, Isle of Wight.

== History ==
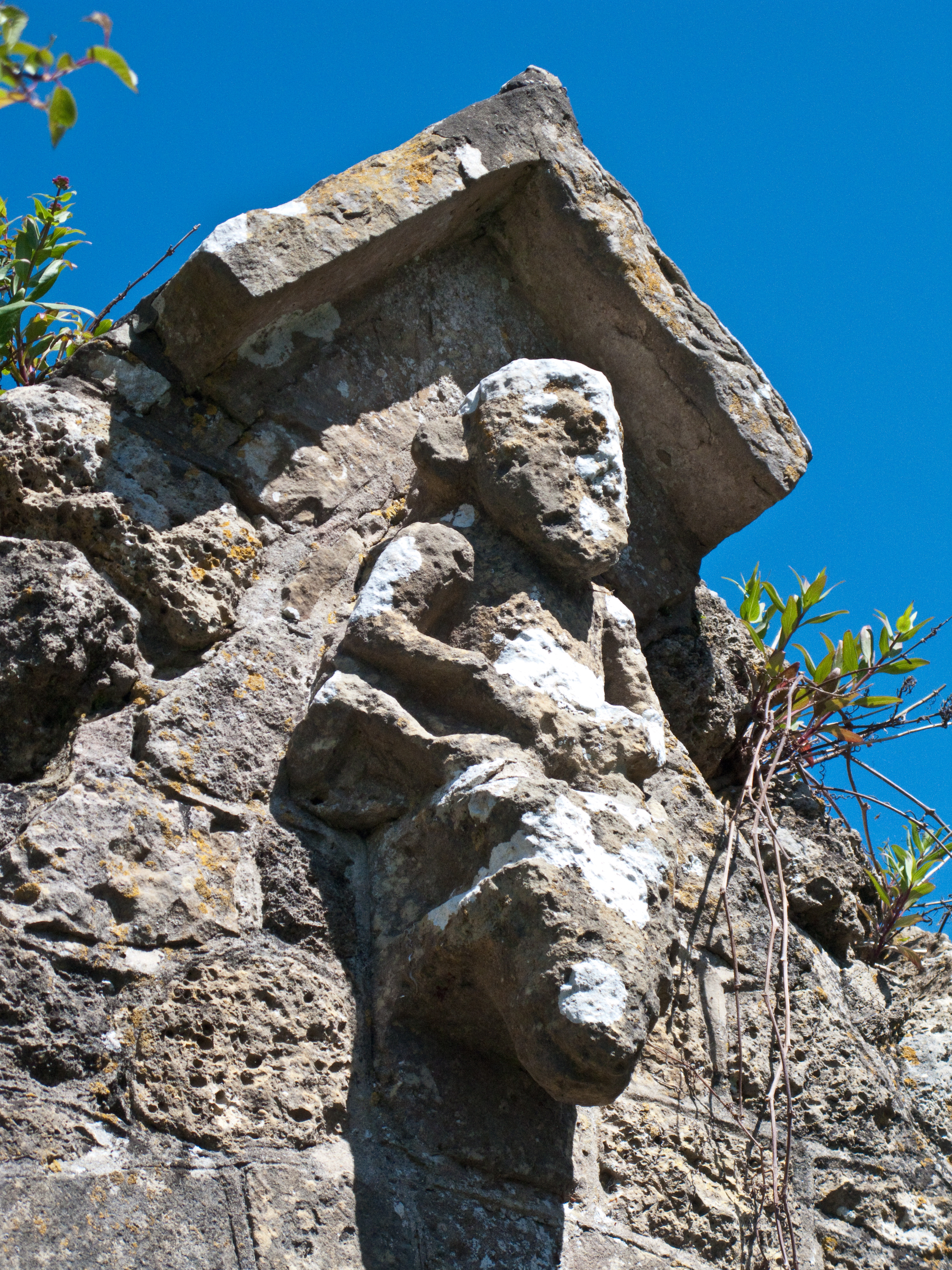
Binstead sheela na gig

The 11th- and 13th-century church is located between the village and the coast. Its location some distance from the modern centre of Binstead probably indicates a medieval village associated with the quarries in the church's vicinity.

Most of the chancel is of herringbone masonry. The original nave was replaced in 1844 and enlarged in 1875 by the addition of the north aisle. The bellcote dates from 1925 and contains a pre-reformation bell believed to have come from the original, now ruined, Cistercian Quarr Abbey.

On 7 June 1969, the church was seriously damaged by fire. It was restored and rededicated in February 1971. Many stained-glass windows were destroyed and replaced by new designs by Lawrence Lee.

Outside a sheela na gig, locally known as the "Saxon Idol", is carved on a stone gateway to the churchyard which contains several old and interesting burials. Possibly the best known is that of Thomas Sivell who was mistaken for a smuggler by customs officers and shot. In more recent times Nicholas Dingley, known as Razzle, the drummer of Hanoi Rocks was buried here.

== Organ ==
The church has a pipe organ dating from around 1897 by Hele & Co. A specification of the organ can be found on the National Pipe Organ Register.
