= Wihtgar =

Wihtgar may refer to:

- Wihtgar, early king of the Wihtwara
- Wihtgar Ælfricsson, 11th-century Anglo-Saxon thegn

== See also ==
- Witgar
