= Brading Down =

Hill on the Isle of Wight, England

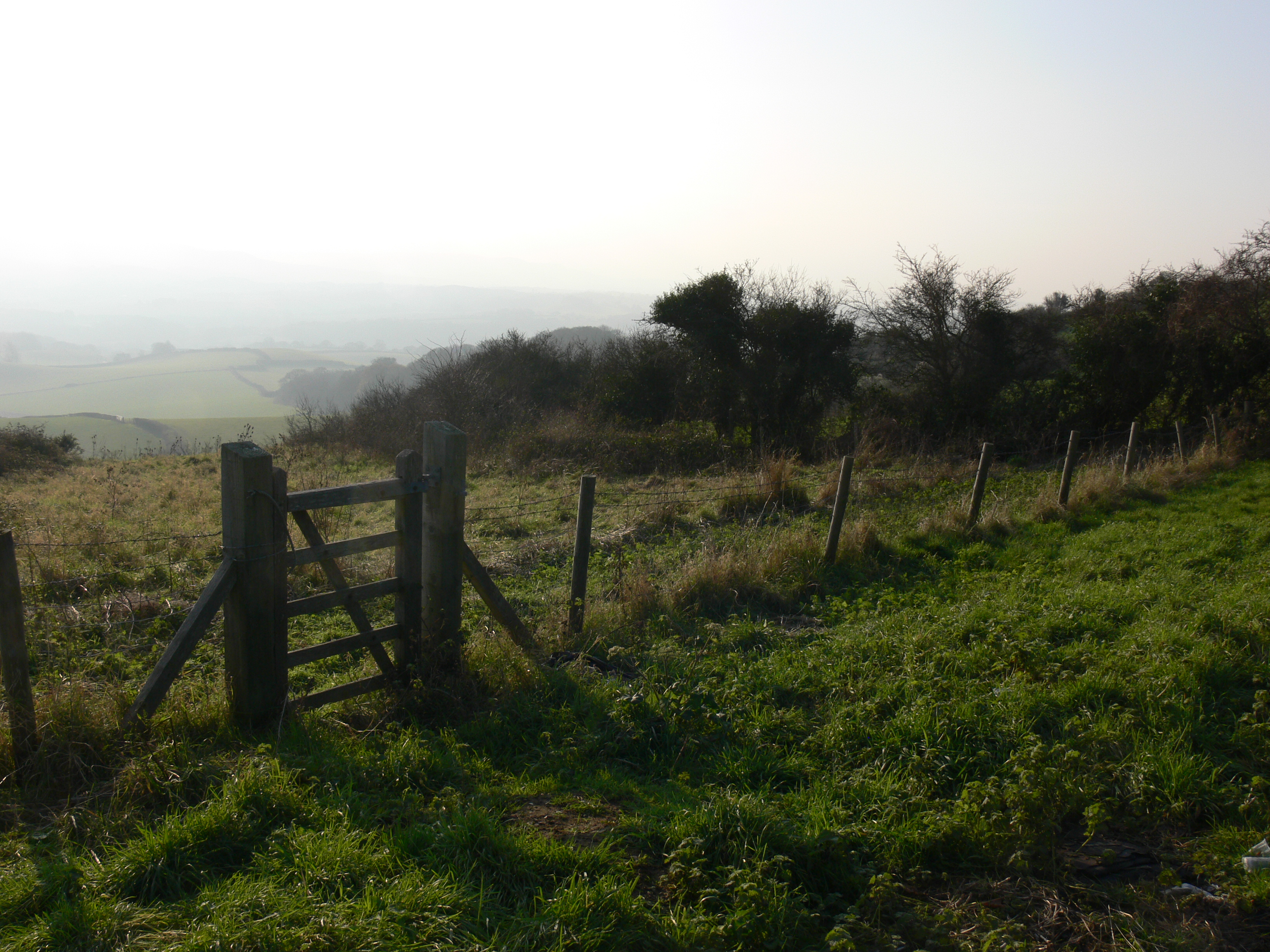
- Brading Down, looking southwest towards Ventnor

Highest point
- Elevation: 123 m (404 ft)
- Coordinates: 50°40′43″N 1°09′33″W

Geography
- Location: Isle of Wight, England
- OS grid: SZ595869
- Topo map: OS Landranger 196

Brading Down is a chalk down southwest of Brading, Isle of Wight. It is a prominent hill which overlooks Sandown Bay, with views across the bay towards Shanklin, Sandown and Culver Down. It is a Local Nature Reserve.

Parts of the down are private, including an area used as a covered reservoir, and some for agriculture. However, much of the down, approximately 35 hectares (86 acres), is open to the public and is owned by the Isle of Wight Council and managed by Gift to Nature. The main area of Brading Down is fenced and grazed but access on foot and for horse riders is available from the many pathways entering the area, and the car parks bordering the main Newport to Brading Road.

The thin chalk soils to the east of the site support a typical downland plant community with pyramidal orchids being a particular feature in the summer. In recent years, a programme of scrub clearance has been undertaken. The area is good for butterflies including common blue, chalkhill blue, small, large and dingy skippers, marbled white, gatekeeper, and meadow brown.

In addition to the wildlife interest of chalk downland, the ancient field system on Brading Down is a Scheduled Monument. The finest surviving ancient field system on the Island is to be found on the down. This is likely to be of late Iron Age or Roman date and highlights the last time the fields were ploughed. Nearby is Brading Roman Villa. Further down the slopes, First World War practice trenches and former chalk pits show evidence of more recent archaeological interest.
