= New Town Hall, Brading =

Municipal building in Brading, Isle of Wight, England

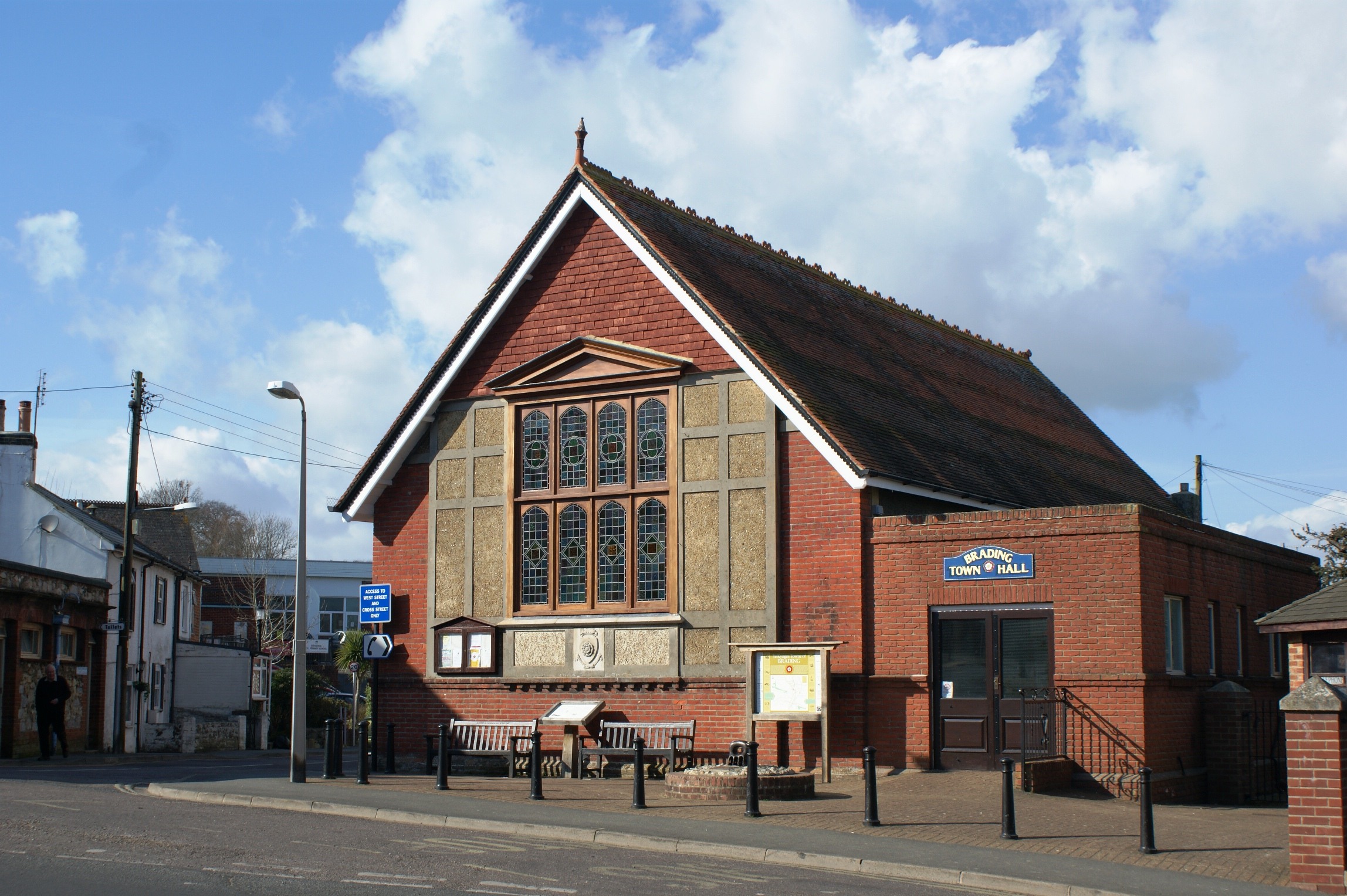
- The building in 2009

- Shown on the Isle of Wight
- 50.6802°N 1.1440°W
- Location: The Bull Ring, Brading

History
- Built: 1903

Site notes
- Architect: John Newman
- Architectural style: arts and crafts style

The New Town Hall is a municipal building in The Bull Ring in Brading, a town on the Isle of Wight, in England. It accommodates the offices and meeting place of Brading Town Council.

== History ==
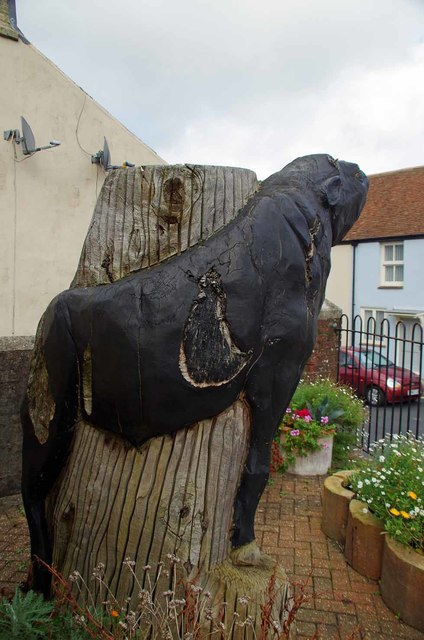
The Brading Bull by Paul Sivell

The new building was commissioned to replace the Old Town Hall, which had been converted for use as a free library. The site selected for the new building was occupied by an old malt house which was duly demolished. It was in a street named The Bull Ring where, from the Middle Ages until 1820, the mayor's dog was decked with coloured ribbons and allowed to bait a bull, the meat from which would subsequently be given to the poor. The old ring to which the bull was tethered remains fixed to the ground outside the building.

Construction work on the new building started in 1902. It was designed by James Newman, broadly in the Arts and Crafts movement style, built in red brick, and was officially opened by Princess Beatrice on 11 February 1903. The design involved a gabled main frontage facing onto The Bull Ring. It was fenestrated by a two-storey mullioned window, which was flanked by half-timbered panels and surmounted by a wooden pediment. There was a small entrance block with a double-panelled doorway to the right. Internally, the principal room was the main hall, which was 55 feet (17 m) long and 25 feet (7.6 m) wide.

Although the building remained in the ownership of the Brading Town Trust, it also became the meeting place of Brading Town Council, which had been formed in 1895, and also accommodated the local post office.

A large wooden carving of a black bull, sculpted by local artist, Paul Sivell, was installed to the right of the town hall in late 2003.
