= Binstead =

Village on the Isle of Wight, England

Coordinates: 50°43′38″N 1°11′18″W

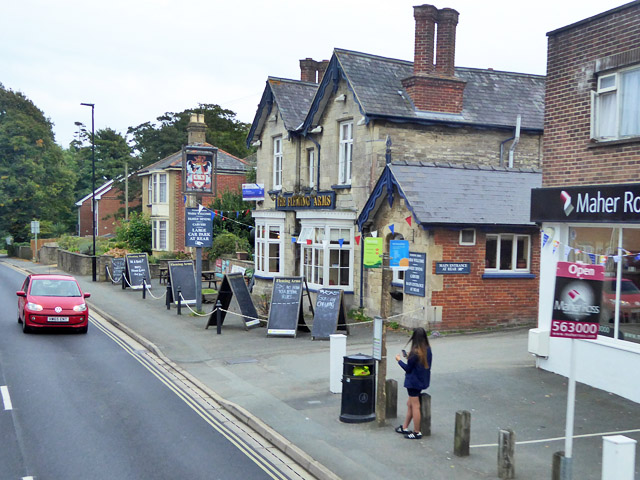
- The Fleming Arms (Now called the Binstead Arms), Binstead

- Location within the Isle of Wight
- Area: 1.88 sq mi (4.9 km^{2})
- Population: 3,185 (2011 Census)
  - Density: 1,694/sq mi (654/km^{2})
- OS grid reference: SZ573922
- Civil parish: Ryde
- Unitary authority: Isle of Wight
- Ceremonial county: Isle of Wight
- Region: South East
- Country: England
- Sovereign state: United Kingdom
- Post town: RYDE
- Postcode district: PO33
- Dialling code: 01983
- Police: Hampshire and Isle of Wight
- Fire: Hampshire and Isle of Wight
- Ambulance: Isle of Wight
- UK Parliament: Isle of Wight East

Binstead is a village in the civil parish of Ryde, on the Isle of Wight, England. It is located in the northeast part of the Island, 1 1/2 miles (2.4 km) west of Ryde on the main road A3054 between Ryde and Newport. In the 2011 Census Binstead had been incorporated within Ryde whilst still retaining its electoral ward, Binstead and Fishbourne.

== Name ==
The name means 'the place where beans are grown', from Old English bēan and stede. Binsted, Hampshire and Binstead, West Sussex have the same origin.

== Amenities ==
The village has a post office and general store as its sole remaining store; until the end of February 2009 when it was removed, it also had a phone box outside. There was also a second shop located opposite the Post Office until sometime in the 2000s, but it is now a residential dwelling.

Binstead has a primary school, two recreational fields, access to a public common (Dame Anthony's Common) and beach (Player's Beach).

Brickfields, a small horse riding centre, was located off Newnham Road to the south of Binstead but it closed in 2013.

The local pub is "The Binstead Arms", previously named "The Fleming Arms", located on Binstead Road.

Southern Vectis bus route 9 serves the main road every 10 minutes in the daytime between Ryde and Newport. Route 4 links the town with East Cowes and local route 37 covers other areas linking to Ryde.

== History ==
Binstead is recorded in 1086 in the Domesday Book as Benestede. It became known for the quality of its limestone which led to a local quarrying industry, the result of which is still visible in the village's landscape and place names. The nearby Quarr Abbey takes its name from the Old French for quarry (quarr(i)ere) and the suffix 'pitts' is occasionally found in house and road names. The quarries were known as pits.

Though there are reports that it has been quarried as far back as the Roman occupation, the earliest recorded quarrying was by the first Norman Bishop of Winchester, Walkelin, who was granted half a hide (60 acres) of land by William the Conqueror. He used the stone to construct Winchester Cathedral starting in 1079. Subsequently, the stone was used in the building of Chichester Cathedral, Romsey Abbey and part of the Tower of London.

During the Napoleonic War Daniel List, a local shipwright, successfully carried out shipbuilding at Binstead for the Royal Navy, comprising three 36-gun frigates - HMS Magicienne in 1812, and HMS Tagus and HMS Tiber in 1813.

By 1905 the parish had 1,206 acres of land.

In 1931 the parish had a population of 906. On 1 April 1933 the parish was abolished and merged with Ryde and Newport.

In the nineteenth century, Ulysses Burgh, 2nd Baron Downes, and his wife Christopheria had a holiday home in the village, Binstead Lodge. It was destroyed by fire in 1851, and replaced by Binstead House, now known as The Keys and listed at Grade II.

== Churches ==
Binstead has two churches, the Methodist Church, built in 1889, and the Church of the Holy Cross, constructed around 1150 (though went through remodelling in the 13th and 19th centuries). The monastery Quarr Abbey is nearby.
