= Hill Farmhouse =

Coordinates: 50.6968°N 1.1326°W

Hill Farmhouse (also Writtleston House) is an English country house in Brading, Isle of Wight. The 17th century farmhouse, a Grade II listed building, is located on Carpenters Road. It was constructed of local limestone. While the two storey gabled porch was an addition, the mullioned window to the left of the porch is an original. An arched doorway is Tudor style.
