= Frederick Trumble =

English cricketer and Royal Navy officer

Personal information
- Full name: Frederick Hugh Geoffrey Trumble
- Born: 9 October 1893; Brading, Isle of Wight, England
- Died: 10 May 1918 (aged 24); HMS Warwick, North Sea, off Ostend, Belgium
- Batting: Right-handed

Career statistics
Competition	First-class
Matches	1
Runs scored	8
Batting average	4.00
100s/50s	–/–
Top score	8
Catches/stumpings	–/–
- Source: Cricinfo, 21 June 2019

Frederick Hugh Geoffrey Trumble (9 October 1893 – 10 May 1918) was an English first-class cricketer and Royal Navy officer.

Trumble was born at Brading on the Isle of Wight to Frederick Hugh Geoffrey Trumble (died 1915), of The Old House, Haywards Heath, Sussex, and his wife, Ada Catherine, daughter of George Wood Bayldon, of Wakefield, a paper manufacturer from a family of Yorkshire landowners. He was educated at the Britannia Royal Naval College, entering in September 1908. He graduated in 1912, entering into the Royal Navy as a midshipman. He made a single appearance in first-class cricket for the Royal Navy against the British Army cricket team at Lord's in 1914. Batting twice in the match, he was dismissed without scoring by William Parker in the Royal Navy's first-innings, while in their second-innings he was dismissed by Francis Wilson for 8 runs. He was promoted to the rank of sub-lieutenant in July 1914, with promotion to the rank of lieutenant coming in June 1916. He was serving aboard HMS Warwick, the flagship of rear admiral Sir Roger Keyes, during the Second Ostend Raid in May 1918. He was killed during the raid, when he was shot in the head by an accidental discharge of a Lewis gun. He was posthumously mentioned in dispatches for his actions during the raid in August 1918. He was buried with full military honours at Dover.
