= Witgar =

Witgar or Witger (Latin: Witgarius, Wigerus) is a masculine Germanic given name. It may refer to:

- Witgar, bishop of Saint-Jean-de-Maurienne (fl. 773)
- Witgar, bishop of Turin (r. 832–838)
- Witgar (bishop of Augsburg) (died 887)
- Witger of Compiègne (10th century), author of the Genealogia Arnulfi comitis Flandriae
- Witger, name of Wigeric of Lotharingia in some hagiography

== See also ==
- Wihtgar
