= Adgestone =

Hamlet on the Isle of Wight, England

Coordinates: 50.67511°N 1.15802°W

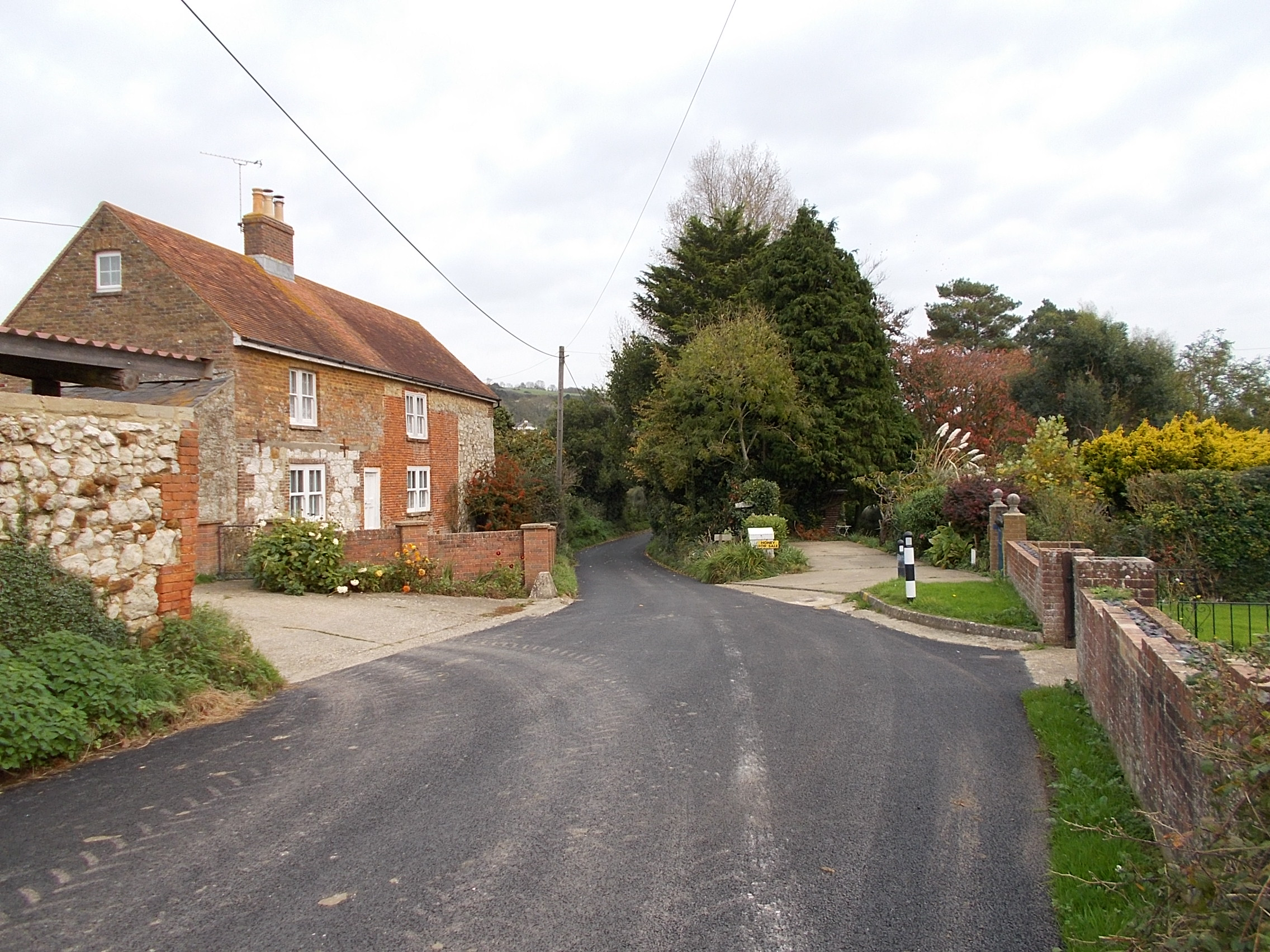

- Location within the Isle of Wight
- OS grid reference: SZ595865
- Unitary authority: Isle of Wight
- Ceremonial county: Isle of Wight
- Region: South East
- Country: England
- Sovereign state: United Kingdom
- Post town: SANDOWN
- Postcode district: PO36
- Dialling code: 01983
- Police: Hampshire and Isle of Wight
- Fire: Hampshire and Isle of Wight
- Ambulance: Isle of Wight
- UK Parliament: Isle of Wight East

Adgestone is a small hamlet on the Isle of Wight. It is located close to Brading (where the 2011 Census was included) in the east of the island.

There is 10-acre (40,000 m^{2}) vineyard in Adgestone which also is the site of a bed and breakfast. This is one of the oldest vineyards in the British Islands, having been started in 1968.

There is a campsite in Adgestone. The nearest public transport is bus route 3 on the main road through Brading.

== Name ==
The name is thought to mean 'the farmstead or personal estate belonging to a man called Æfic', from Old English Æfic (personal name) and tūn.

1086: Avicestone

1198: Auicheston

~1220: Avichestune

1299: Auchestone

1351: Achestone

1487: Agestone

== History ==
It was mentioned in the Domesday Book as being in the hundred of Bowcombe and the county of Hampshire. It had a population of 5 households and 1 vavasor. It also had 1 ploughland and 1 lord's plough team. Its value was 10 shillings in 1066 and 1086. In 1086, its tenant-in-chief was William son of Azur.

== See also ==
- Adgestone Manor
