= Stuf =

Stuf may refer to:

- Stuf, legendary early king of the Wihtwara
- Stuf, Oreo cookie filling, see List of Oreo varieties
