= Brading Roman Villa =

Archaeological museum in Brading, England

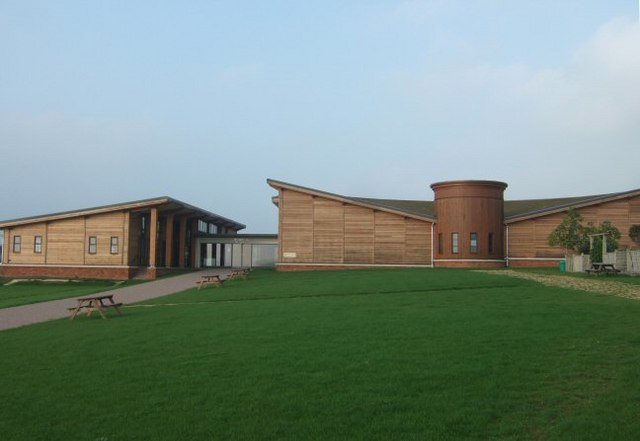
- Site museum housing the mosaics and walls

- Location within Isle of Wight

General information
- Location: Brading grid reference SZ598862, United Kingdom
- Coordinates: 50.6728°N 1.1544°W
- Construction started: 1st century
- Demolished: 4th century

Brading Roman Villa was a Roman courtyard villa which has been excavated and put on public display in Brading on the Isle of Wight.

== Discovery and excavation ==
In 1879, a farmer called Mr Munns struck a buried mosaic floor while making holes on his land for a sheep pen. Captain Thorp of Yarbridge, who was in the area looking for Roman antiquities, helped Mr Munns uncover the Gallus panel the next day. By spring 1880, all of the site on Mr Munns' land had been excavated, which was half the villa; the remainder lay in the Oglander estate. Excavations were able to continue when Lady Louisa Oglander purchased the other half of the site.

Although the site was open to the public by the Oglander estate for many years, it was handed over to a charitable trust in 1994 and upgraded with a visitor centre, exhibition, shop and cafe. In 2004 the cover building was replaced and the visitor facilities were upgraded. Behind the site is a small amphitheatre made from grassy banks. This was recently made from spoil from the building work.

The University of Oxford began a five-year excavation in August 2008, with hopes that it would reveal some new mosaics.

== History ==
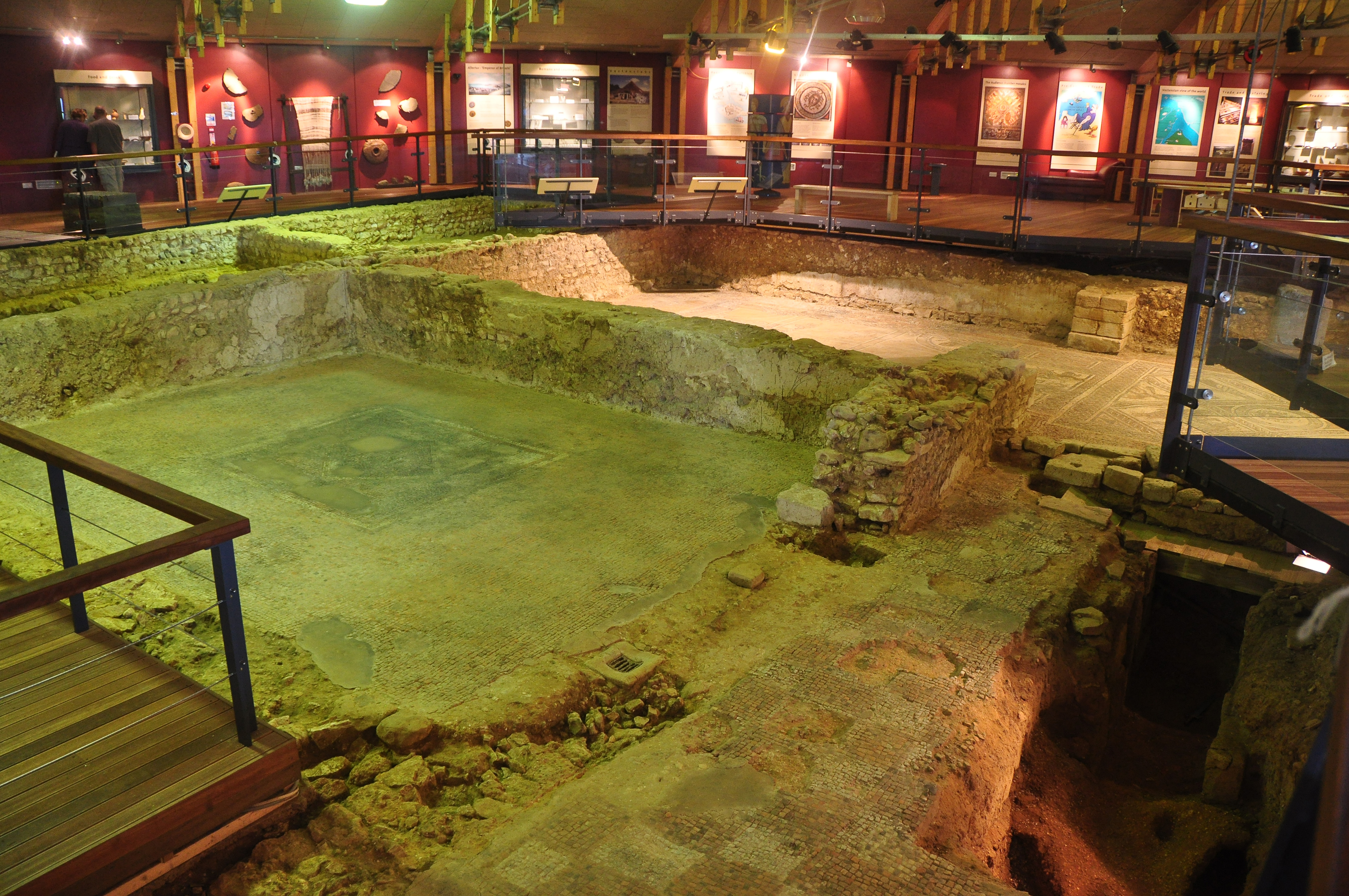
Inside the covered building of the museum

The Roman 2nd Augusta Legion under Vespasian conquered the Isle of Wight in AD 44. The first simple villa dates from the mid-1st century but, over the next hundred years, it developed into a large and impressive stone-built villa around three sides of a central courtyard. Its luxurious rooms contained many fine Roman mosaics.

Despite a disastrous fire in the 3rd century AD, the villa was still used for farming purposes for another 100 years. Around AD 340, Brading Villa, like many estates in southern Britain, was suffering frequent pirate raids. However, Roman coins excavated at the site indicate that Brading was still occupied until AD395, when Emperor Honorius began his reign. The Villa was used for storing grain for an unknown period of time before finally collapsing in the 5th century. Undergrowth covered the site, and when the land was cleared to be used for agriculture, the location of Brading Roman Villa had been forgotten.

== The Villa ==
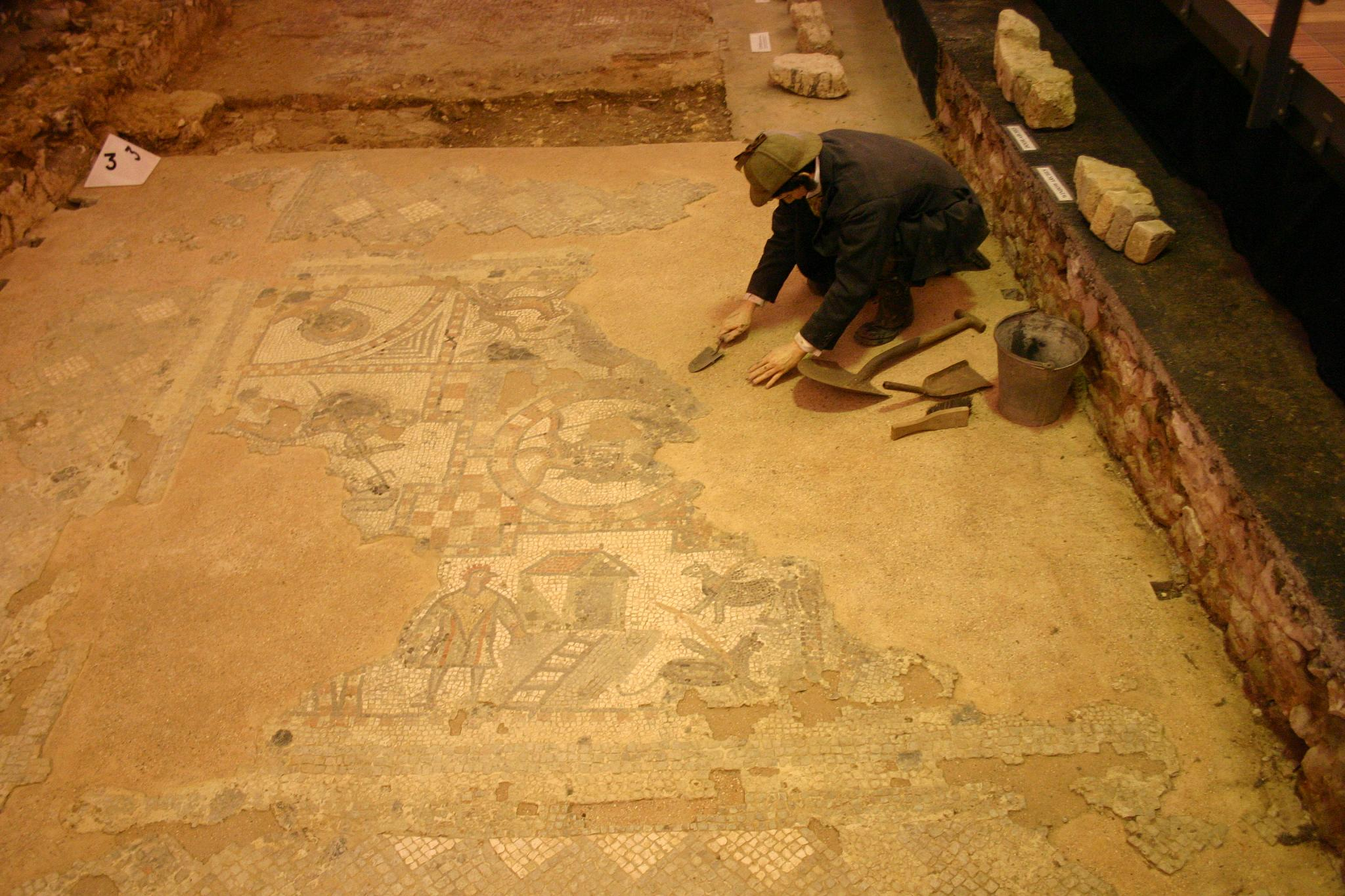
Mosaic in Brading Roman Villa

The villa's excavated remains are now undercover in the Exhibition and Visitor Centre. The ground floor's 12 rooms all survived, though it is not clear what all the rooms were used for. The largest room in the house with its beautiful mosaic floor may have been used for special occasions and to entertain guests. As there is no evidence of an indoor kitchen, food may have been prepared outside to reduce the risk of fire. Artefacts found within the house point to a high standard of living; Samian pottery, jewellery and games have all been found.

There are mosaics in five of the rooms in the main villa house, which display a variety of subjects indicating the owners' wealth and education. As well as geometrical patterns, there is an Orpheus mosaic, while another features Bacchus, a cockerel-headed man, gladiators and a dome-shaped building. The largest mosaic, in two parts, contains images of Roman gods, goddesses, Medusa, and scenes depicting farming and the sea.

=== The cockerel-headed man ===
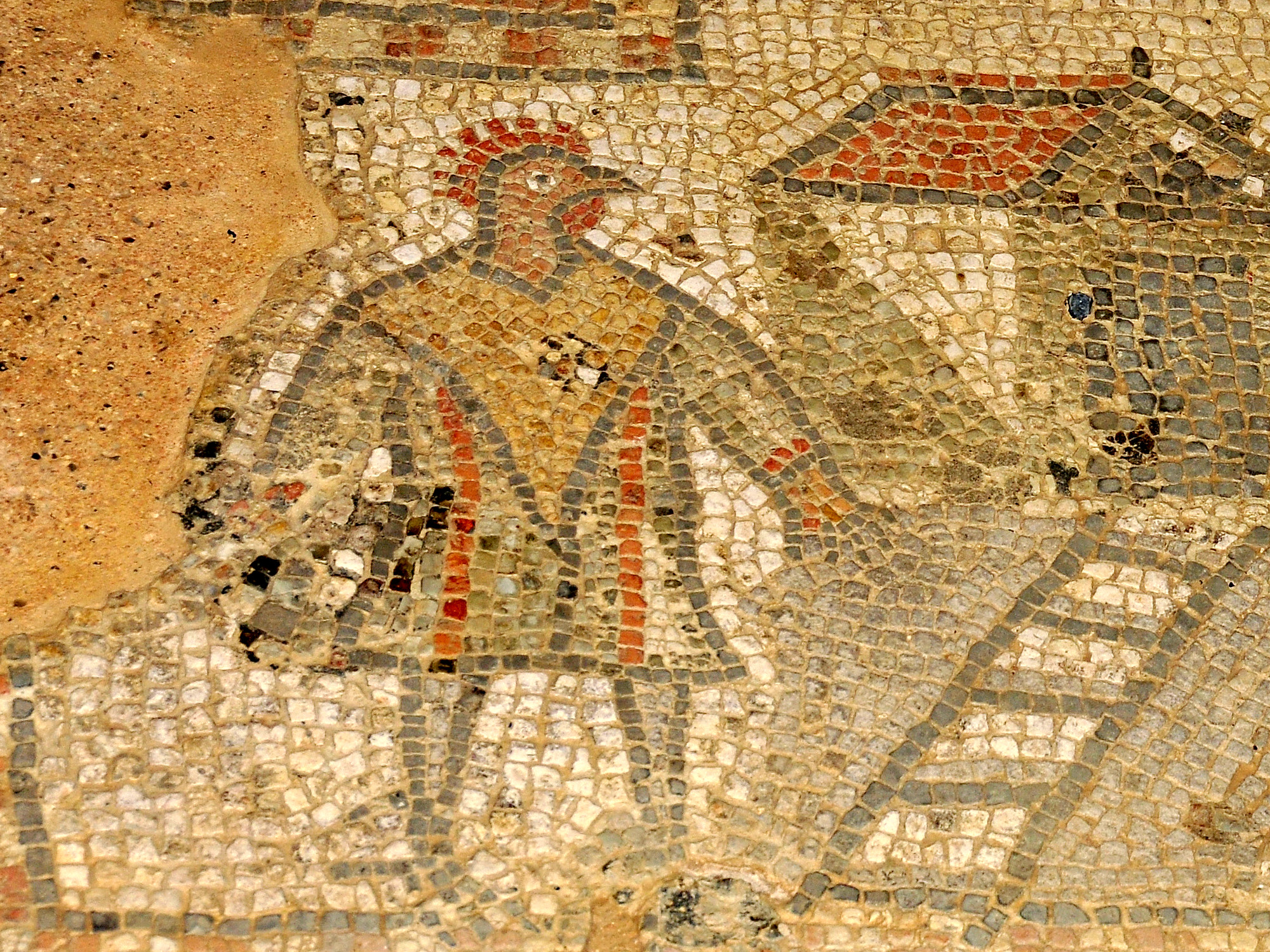
The cockerel-headed man

The cockerel-headed man is a unique feature of the mosaics. The mosaic shows the cockerel-headed man beside a building approached by steps, with two griffins beyond.

One older opinion is that he represents the gnostic deity known as Abraxas; however Abraxas is usually depicted with a serpent's tail as well as a cockerel's head, which makes this interpretation seem unlikely. An alternative view is that the figure lampoons a gladiator (or venator) called "Gallus" since the name means "cockerel" in Latin. It has even been suggested that the figure lampoons the emperor of the Eastern Roman Empire Constantius Gallus (ruled 351–354). Mosaics at Brading Villa are closely similar to others from Antioch. It has been speculated that Palladius, the former magister officiorum of that city, was their creator after his banishment to Britain, the cockerel-headed man being Palladius' lampoon of his former persecutor. A more sober view is that the figure may simply be a fantastical animal similar to the dog-headed figures known elsewhere.

== Other buildings ==
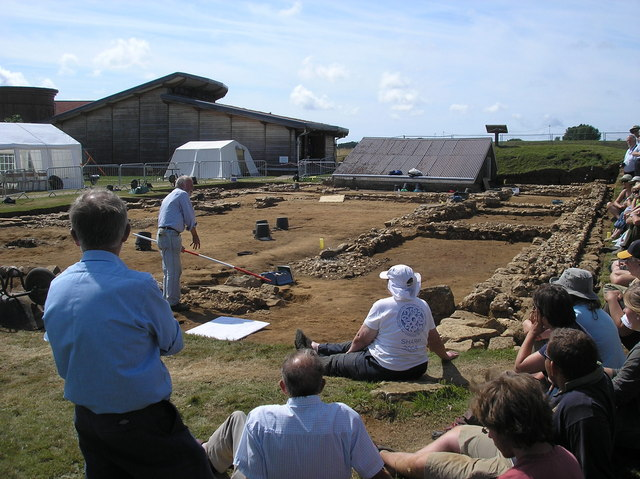
Excavation of north wing in August 2008

On the north side of the main villa house are the remains of a farmhouse, probably lived in by workers, which has the remains of a hypocaust (underfloor heating) and a well. On the south side were agricultural buildings such as a granary and storerooms, but these do not survive today.

Although there is no evidence of a Roman formal garden on the site, a water feature called a nymphaeum was found outside the villa and is now displayed in the Exhibition Centre. A reconstructed Roman garden has been planted in the grounds with a variety of plants, herbs and flowers representing those grown in Roman times.
