= Brading Marshes RSPB reserve =

RSPB nature reserve on the Isle of Wight, England

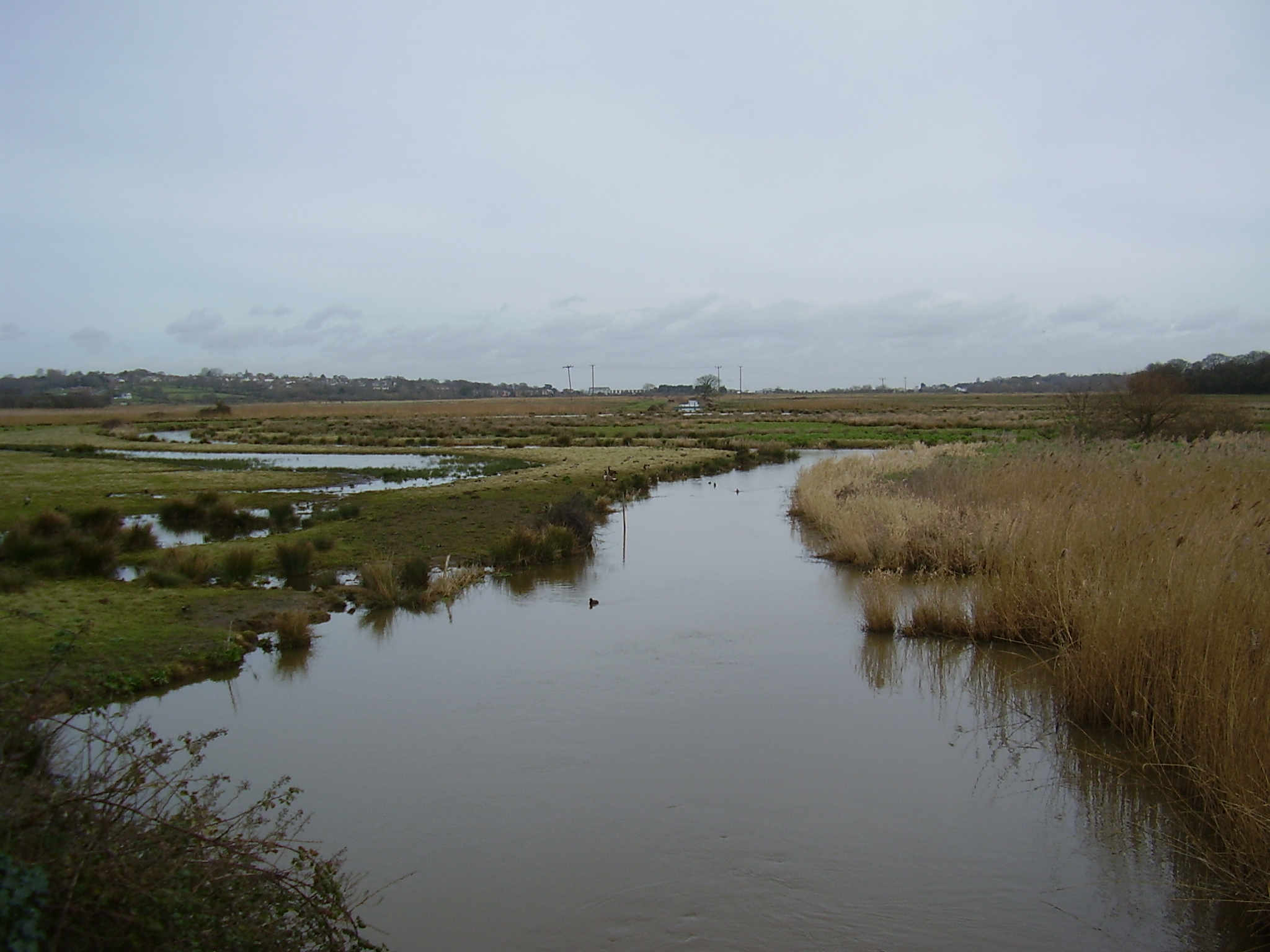
Brading Marshes

Brading Marshes nature reserve is the only Royal Society for the Protection of Birds (RSPB) reserve on the Isle of Wight, England. Situated on the east coast of the Island, behind Bembridge Harbour, it was acquired in 2001 and is a mix of lagoons and ditches, reed beds and meadows, with a fringe of ancient woodland. This marsh is the site of a wetland restoration project by the RSPB.

The land was reclaimed from the sea for agricultural use at the end of the 19th century. Today, grazing, haymaking and cutting rough vegetation encourage flowers and wetland birds.

In spring and summer, lapwing, grey heron, tufted duck and shelduck can be seen. Marsh harrier and peregrines can also be seen. During autumn and winter migrating wading birds pass through, joining ducks, geese and wading birds feeding in the pools. The reserve is also home to many insects, plants and other animals.

The reserve is open all year round and free to visit.

Brading Marshes is included within a Site of Special Scientific Interest (SSSI) called Brading Marshes to St. Helen's Ledges. The RSPB is thus one of the owners of land within the area designated as Brading Marshes to St. Helen's Ledges SSSI.
