= Brading =

Town on the Isle of Wight, England

Coordinates: 50.679°N 1.140°W

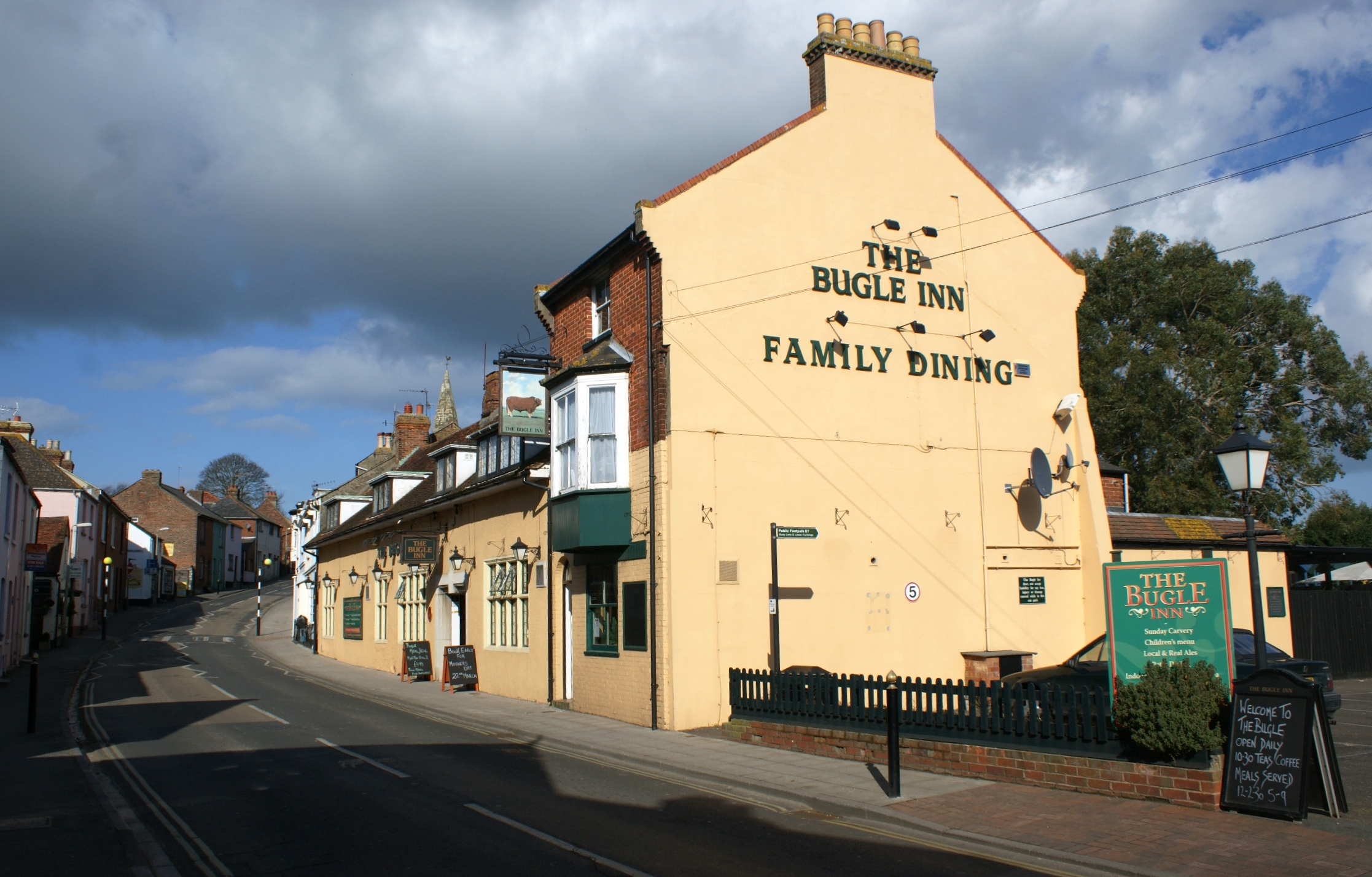
- The Bugle Inn, Brading High Street

- Location within the Isle of Wight
- Area: 14.2621 km^{2} (5.5066 sq mi)
- Population: 1,906 (2021 Census)
  - Density: 134/km^{2} (350/sq mi)
- OS grid reference: SZ607870
- Unitary authority: Isle of Wight
- Ceremonial county: Isle of Wight
- Region: South East
- Country: England
- Sovereign state: United Kingdom
- Post town: SANDOWN
- Postcode district: PO36
- Dialling code: 01983
- Police: Hampshire and Isle of Wight
- Fire: Hampshire and Isle of Wight
- Ambulance: Isle of Wight
- UK Parliament: Isle of Wight East

Brading is a small market town on the east side of the Isle of Wight. It is the main settlement of the civil parish of the same name. The ecclesiastical parish of Brading used to cover about a tenth of the island. The civil parish now includes the town itself and Adgestone, Morton, Nunwell and other outlying areas between Ryde, St Helens, Bembridge, Sandown and Arreton. Alverstone was transferred to the Newchurch parish some thirty years ago.

Brading has a population of 1,906 according to the 2021 Census.

== Name ==
The name means '(the settlement of) the dwellers on the hill-side' from Old English brerd and -ingas. Brerd (hill side, ridge) refers to Brading Down, a 123 metre (404 feet) chalk down. The etymology "broad meadow" is sometimes quoted, but is incorrect.

Spellings mentioned in early sources

- 683: Brerdinges
- 1086: Berardinz
- 1218: Brardinge
- 1235: Brerdinge
- 1507: Bradyng

== History ==
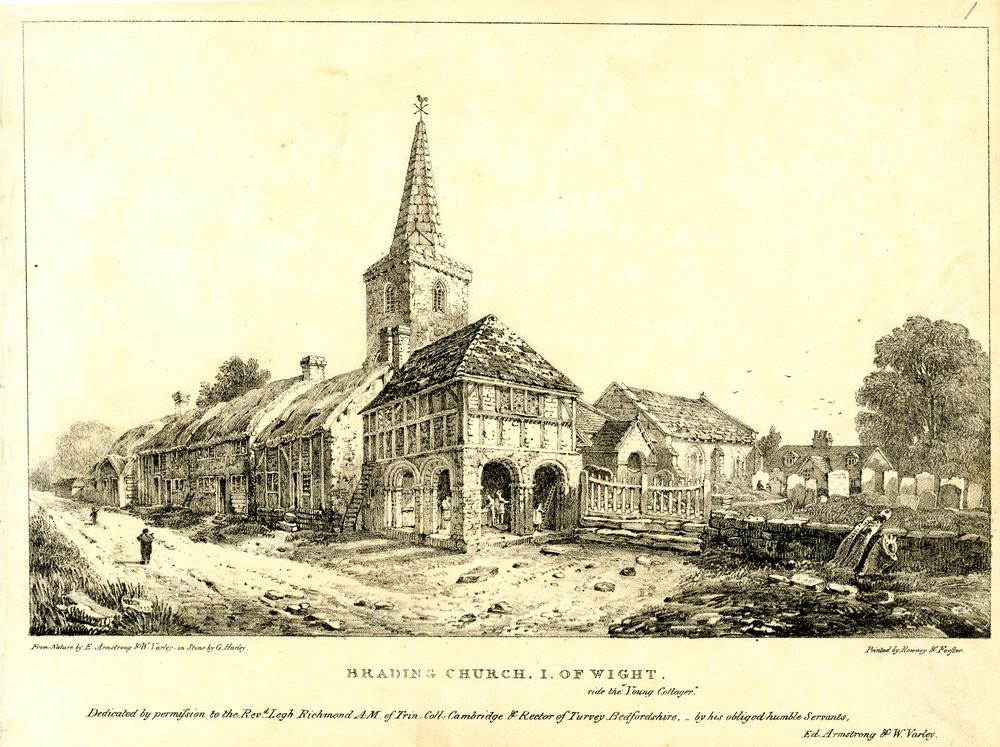
Brading Church, in an 1820s lithograph

=== Early history ===
From early times, Brading ranked as an important island port.

The Roman villa south of the town, and Roman relics discovered locally, indicate that this was an important seaport 2000 years ago. Signs of prehistoric activity have also been found on Brading Down.

History records that St Wilfrid came to the island during the 680s, landed at Brading, preached there to the islanders, and began the conversion of the island. Bede states that King Caedwalla of Wessex killed the pagan population "with merciless slaughter" and replaced them with his own Christian followers, dedicating a quarter of the Isle of Wight to Wilfrid and the Church. Wilfrid would thus have been literally preaching to the converted, because everyone else was dead. This legend was illustrated by a tableau at the Waxworks.

At the Domesday Book, Brading had 4 households and had a value of 10 shillings at 1066, and 1 pound in 1086.

- Tenant-in-chief (1086): William, son of Azur
- Lord (1086): William, son of Azur's nephew
- Overlord (1066): King Edward
- Lord (1086): Alnoth

=== Royal charter and governance ===
Brading was first granted a charter in 1280, unusually for the time directly from King Edward I, rather than the Lord of the Isle (who was its private owner). This led to it being known as the 'King's Town'.

The charter granted to Brading by Edward VI in 1548 refers to the previous charter granted by Edward I. This charter allowed the town to hold two annual fairs. Nowadays the fair is called Brading Day and is held over the first weekend in July.

Because of its status as a town, Brading has a mayor and an elected town council.

In medieval times the town was governed by the steward, bailiffs and 13 jurats, and returned two MPs to the Westminster Parliament. The Reform Act 1832 created a single Isle of Wight parliamentary constituency covering the whole island, until it was divided into two constituencies in 2024. Now the town is a part of the Isle of Wight East parliamentary constituency.

=== The old port ===
Until the 16th century the port was active. Ships lay alongside at the quay behind the Bugle Inn in the High Street. Ships came into Brading Haven for shelter and for provisions, particularly water, which was of a high quality. The north-eastern part of the haven was closed off by an embankment completed in 1594, much of which is still present. Ships would then tie up at the far end of Quay Lane on the other side of the embankment.

Throughout the Middle Ages various attempts were made to drain off the rest of the harbour; for it had gradually become silted up and, except for the main channel of the river, was too shallow to be of any commercial use. Sir Hugh Myddleton, who had constructed the New River from Hertfordshire to central London for James I, undertook this work; but the sea broke in and flooded the land once again. After others had also tried and failed, this reclamation was finally accomplished in 1881 by the building of a substantial embankment right across the harbour, with the building of the railway to Bembridge.

So Brading now shares with Winchelsea and Romney the distinction of being a former seaport without any access to the sea. Losing access to the sea caused Brading to decline in importance, and prevented the sort of growth enjoyed by Cowes and Newport.

=== The Old Town Hall ===
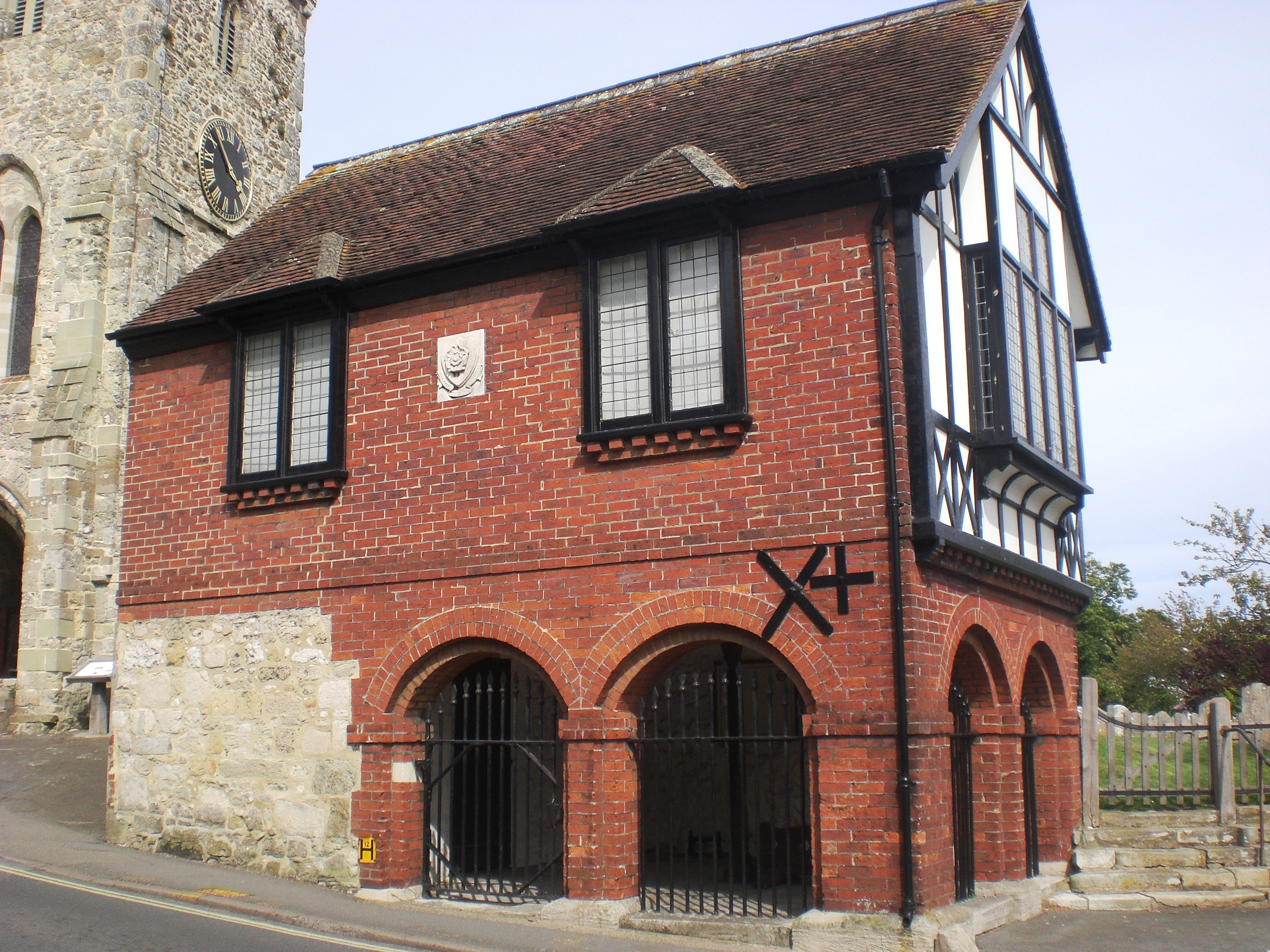
Old Town Hall, Brading

The Old Town Hall stands near to the church. There is no record of the earliest Town Hall, but an entry in The Court Leet Book 1729 refers to the assessment of one shilling rate, and also a subscription towards building a new Town Hall, Market House and Prison, so it is likely it was completed around 1730. This new building remained until 1876 when it was restored to its present state, and then contained the Free Town Library.

=== The Bull Ring ===
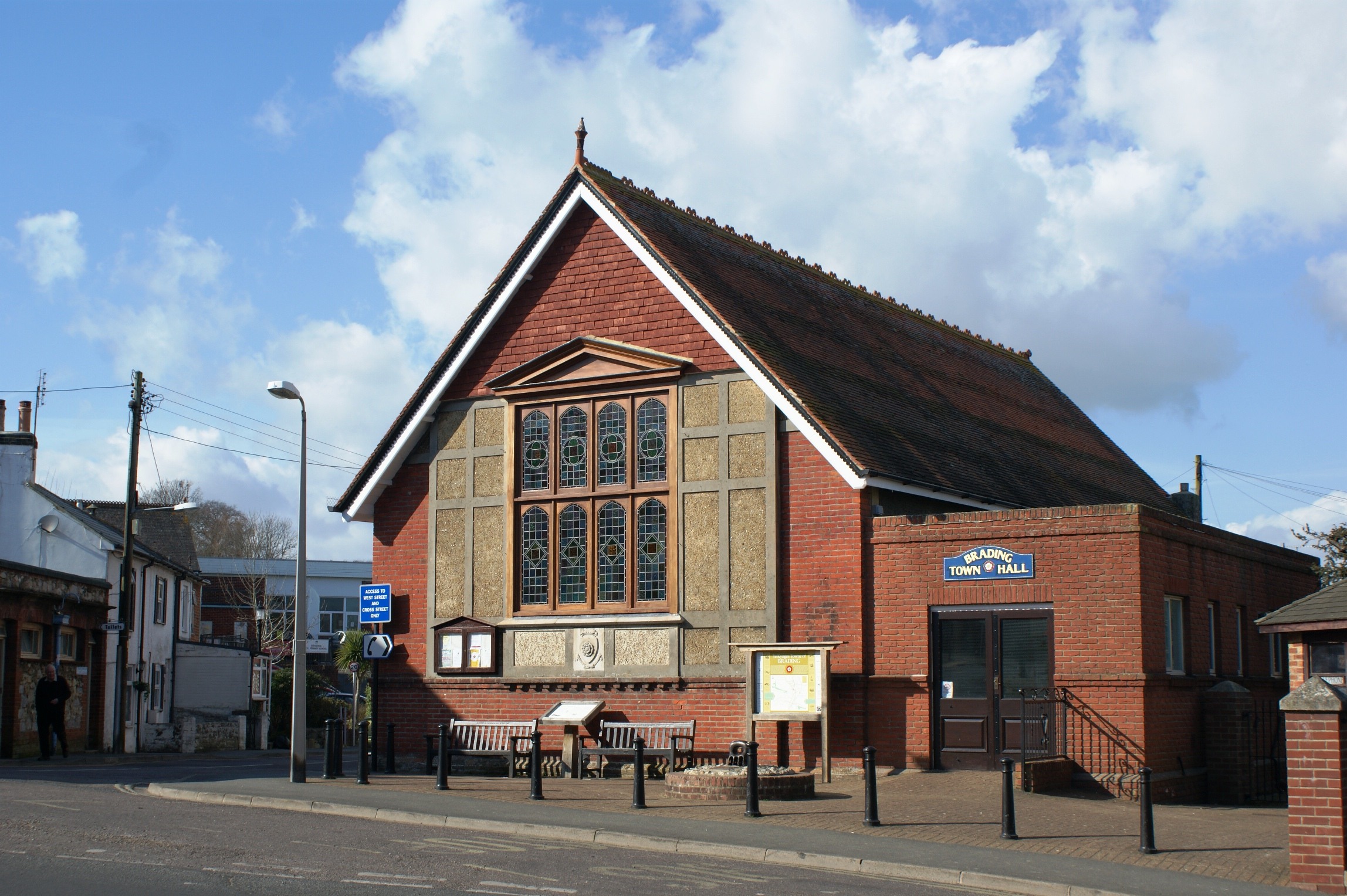
New Town Hall, Brading

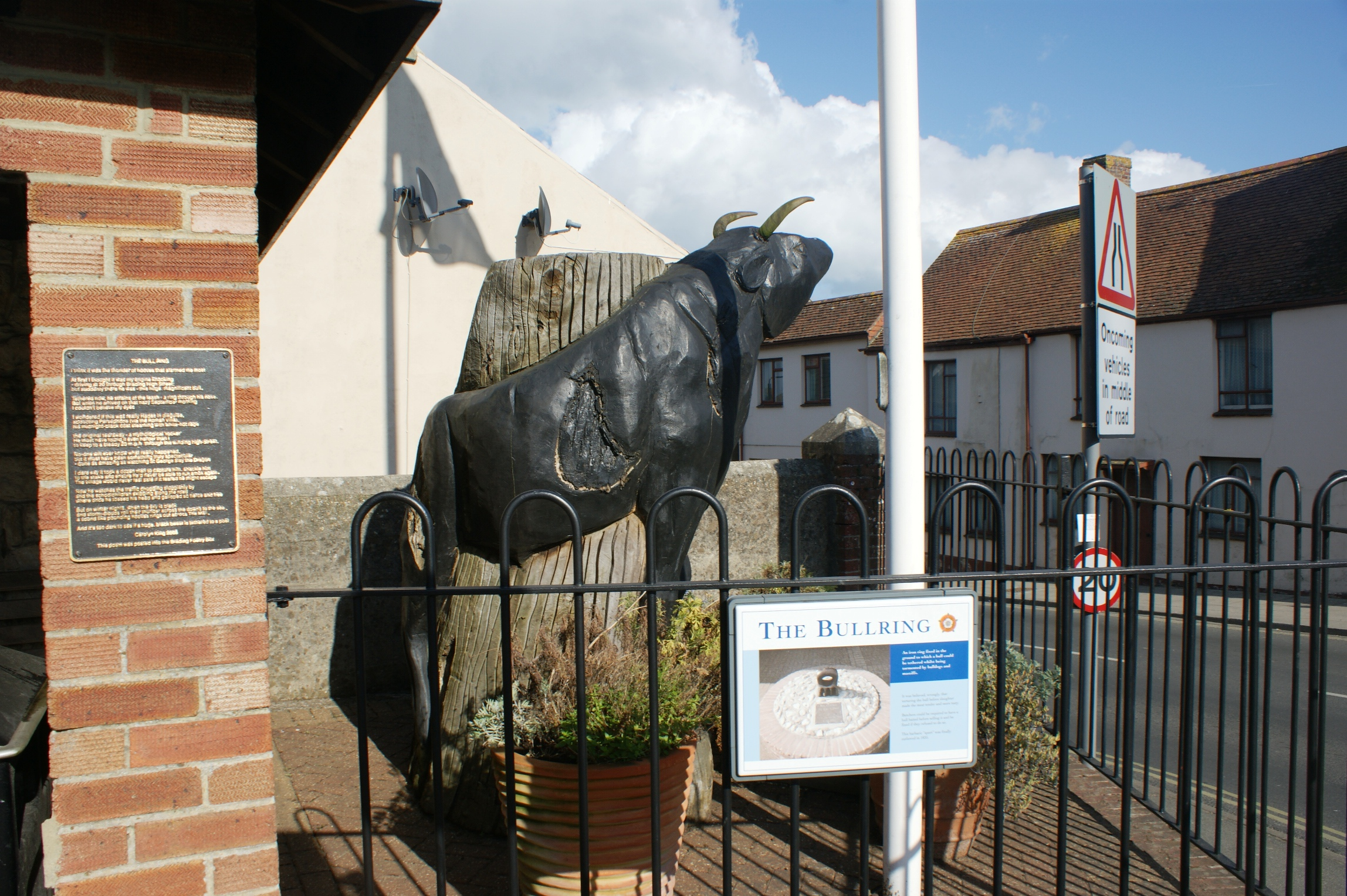
The Statue adjacent to the Bull Ring.

Set in the ground outside the New Town Hall (1903), there is an iron bullring which was once used to secure a bull whilst it was being baited by dogs. According to the diaries of Sir John Oglander, the Governor of the Isle of Wight would donate five guineas for the purchase of the bull to be baited; the meat was afterwards donated to the poor of the town. The Mayor attended this ceremony in full regalia; and a dog, known as the Mayor's Dog, would be decked with coloured ribbons and set on the bull after the proclamation had been made.

A large wooden carving of a bull decorates the Bullring. This is by local artist Paul Sivell. Another of his works is an approximately 10-foot (3 metres) wooden statue of the goddess Diana positioned in the woods above Brading at Kelly's Copse and entitled "For Camilla". This commemorates the murder of a Danish exchange student by a sex attacker from Gosport in 2002. Many local people have added plastic flowers and stuffed toys as tribute.

=== The Town Gun ===
The town possesses a gun. It is a brass piece, made in 1549 by the Owine Brothers, John and Robert, so that the town might be defended from French invasion. The gun was never used in action, but was taken to the top of Brading Down in 1832 so that it could be fired to celebrate the passing of the Reform Bill. Unfortunately it exploded and split, putting a stop to celebrations for the day. It is currently kept at the coach house at Nunwell House.

== Governance ==
Brading is part of the electoral ward called Brading, St. Helens and Bembridge. At the 2011 census the population of this ward was 6,935.

== Wildlife and landscape ==
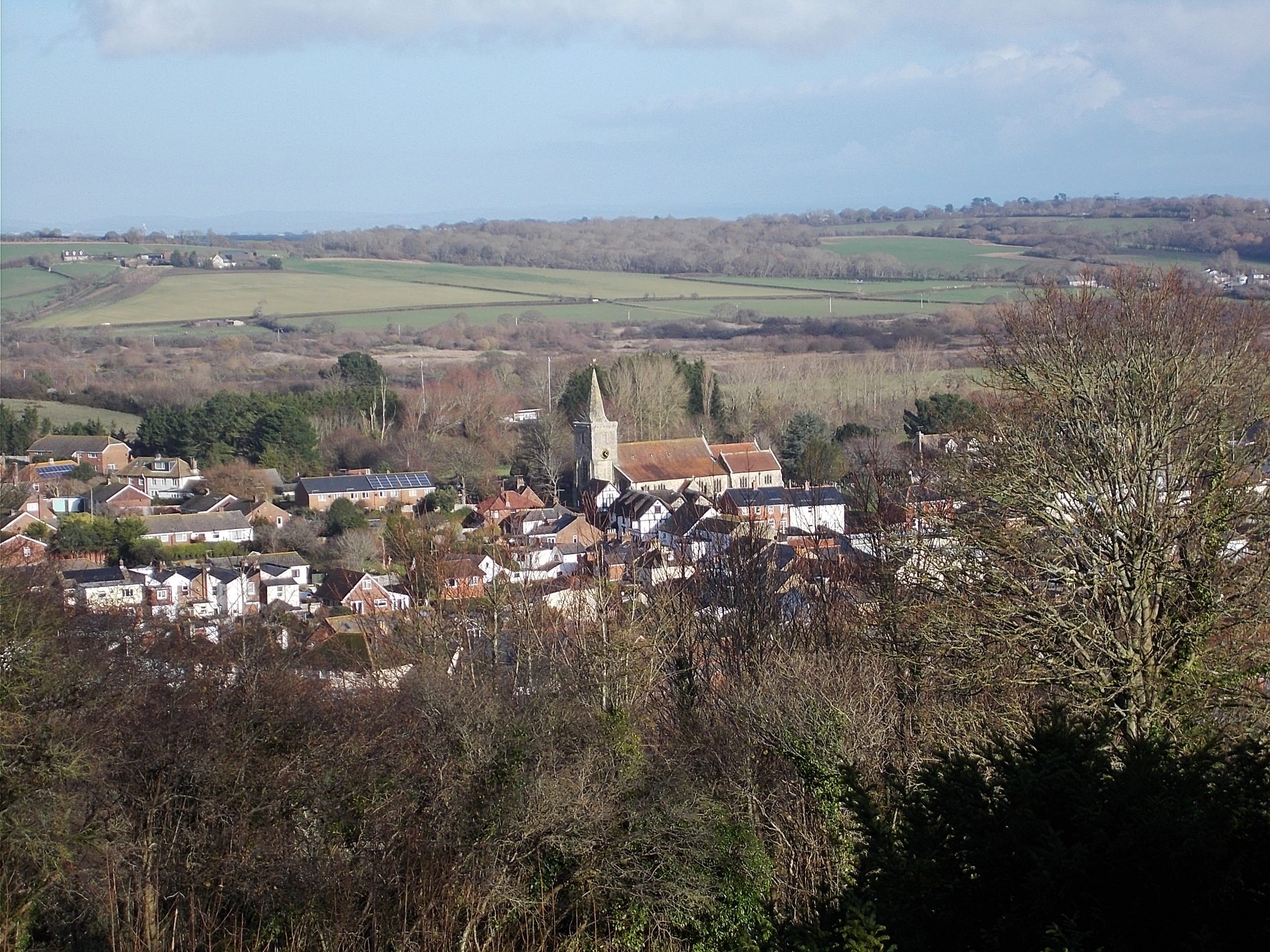
View of Brading from Brading Down

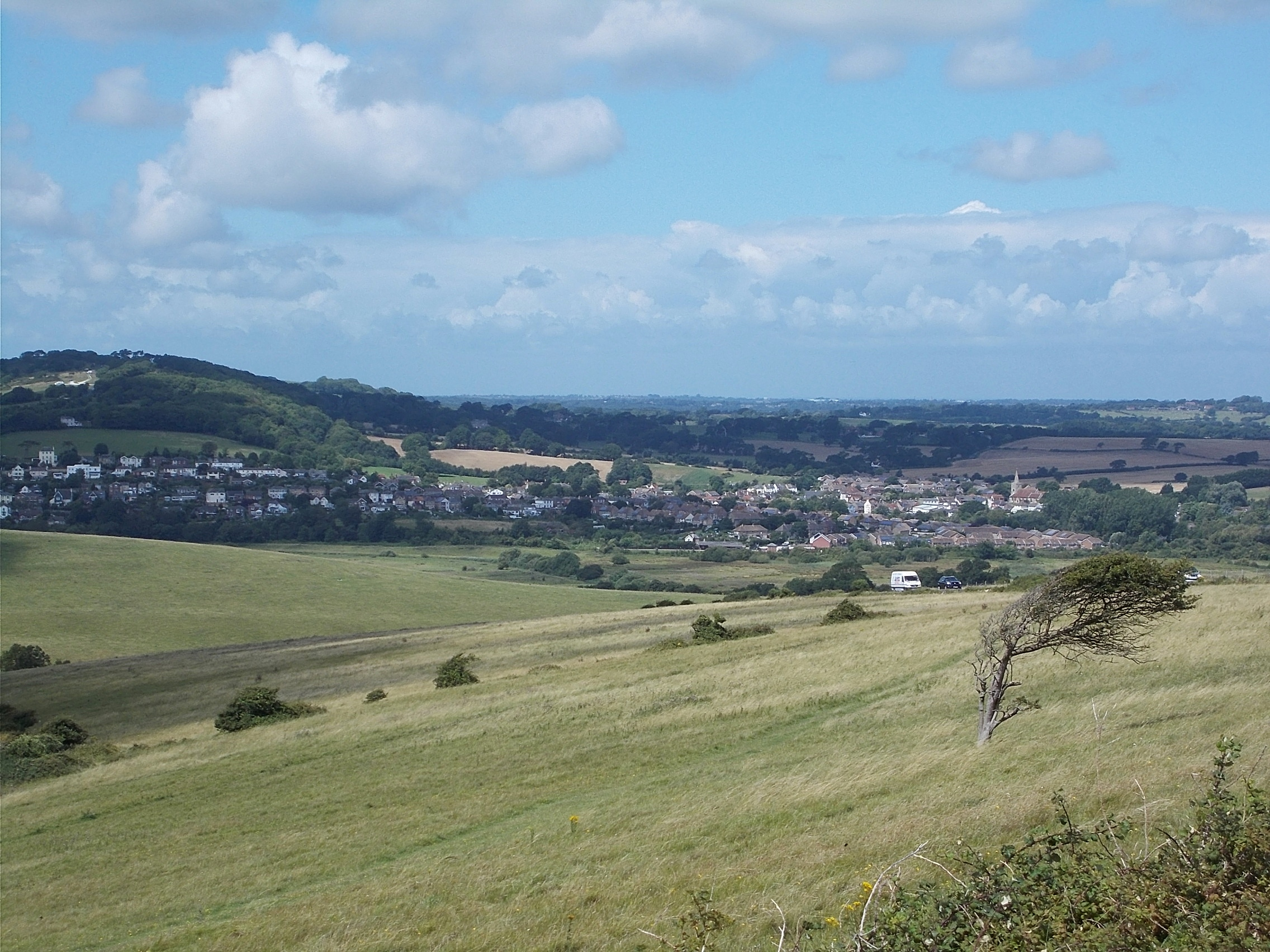
View of Brading from Culver Down, looking west, with Brading Down to the left of the picture behind the village

The south-western part of the parish is included within the Area of Outstanding Natural Beauty. There are two Sites of Important Nature Conservation close to Morton and another on the downs.

Brading Down is a viewpoint and downland beauty spot. From the north side of the hill one can look over the town towards the mainland. From further up, visitors can see the Solent and the Spinnaker Tower at Portsmouth. This elevated site is also of archaeological importance.

The RSPB Brading Marshes nature reserve is the first Royal Society for the Protection of Birds reserve on the Isle of Wight. Situated on the reclaimed land of the old harbour, behind the present-day Bembridge Harbour, it was bought in 2001 and is a mix of lagoons and ditches, reed beds and meadows, with a fringe of ancient woodland. The reserve is free and open to visitors all year round. Notable species include marsh harriers, red squirrels and Cetti's warbler.

== Transport ==
Brading is served by Brading railway station on the Island Line Railway with direct connection to the Wightlink ferry at Ryde Pier Head and stops at Ryde, Smallbrook Junction, Sandown, Lake and Shanklin. The southern fringes of Brading are also on the Island's circular cycle route used for the annual "Bicycle Island Randonée".

The main A3055 road from Ryde to Sandown passes through the town.

The town is well-connected to the surrounding countryside by footpaths and bridleways. The Bembridge Trail passes through the town along Doctors Lane, Cross Street, High Street and Quay Lane (Wall Lane) then along the top of the embankment to St Urian's Copse. There are 71 other footpaths, by-ways and bridle paths in the civil parish area and organised parties of walkers may often be seen meeting at the station or the Bullring.

Southern Vectis run buses on routes 2 and 3 from the town, serving Godshill, Newport, Ryde, Sandown, Shanklin and Ventnor, and some other places. Night buses are run at weekends.

== Features of the town ==
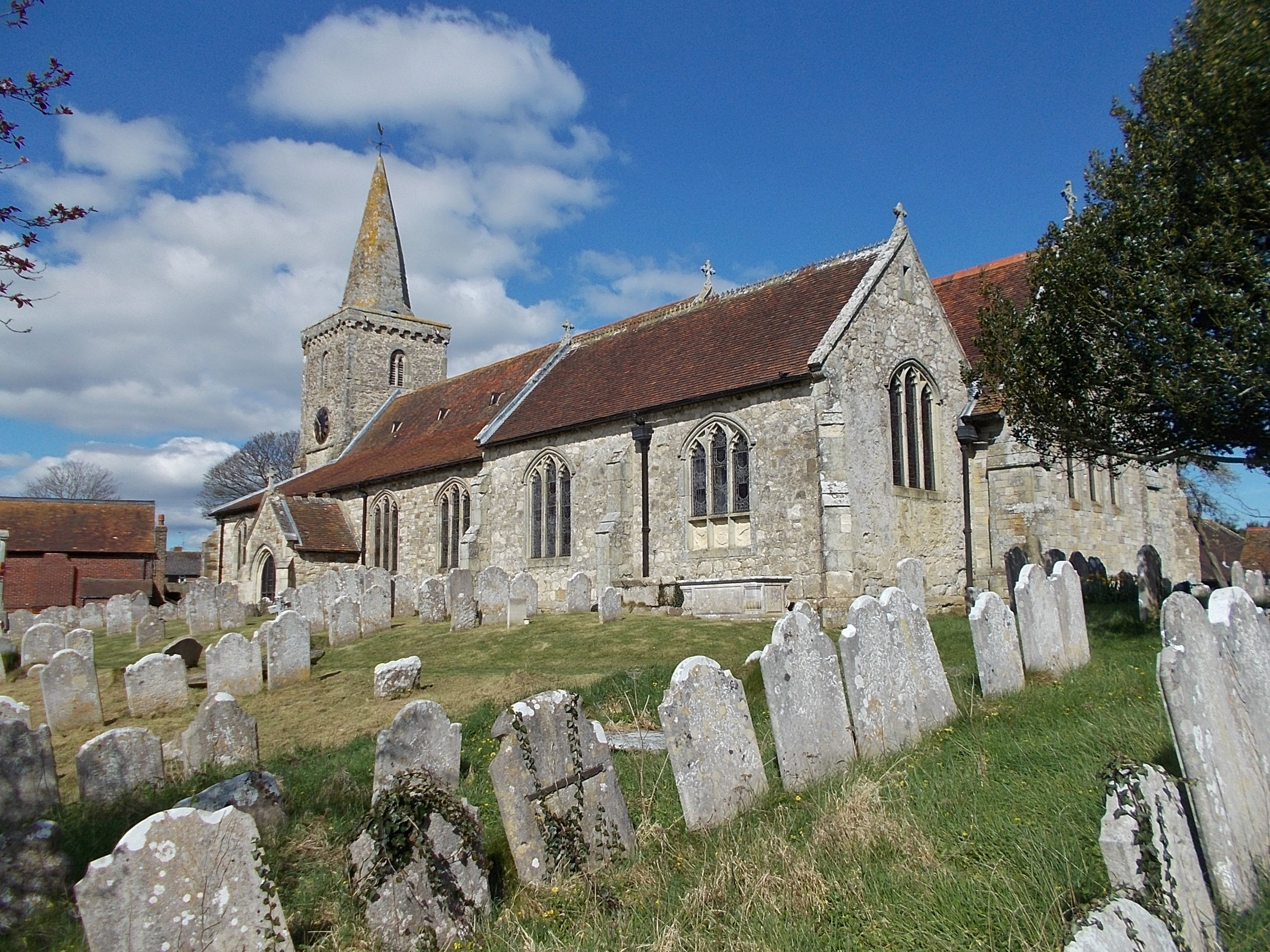
St Mary's Church

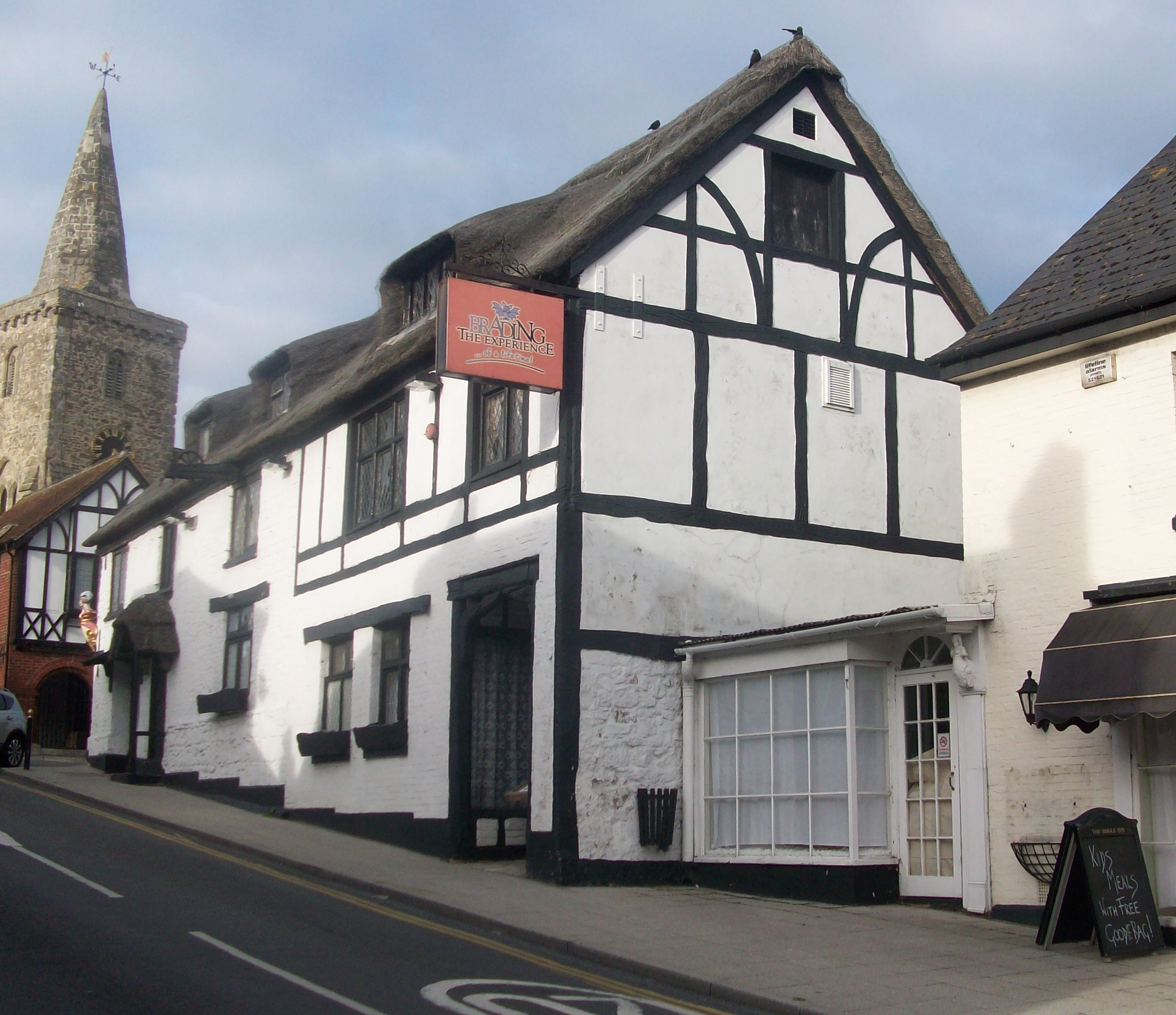
The former Brading Waxworks in August 2010.

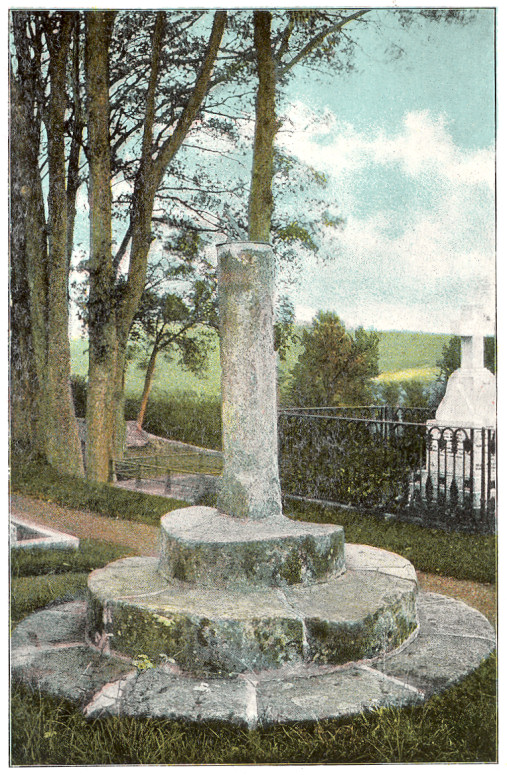
The Sundial, Brading, circa 1910

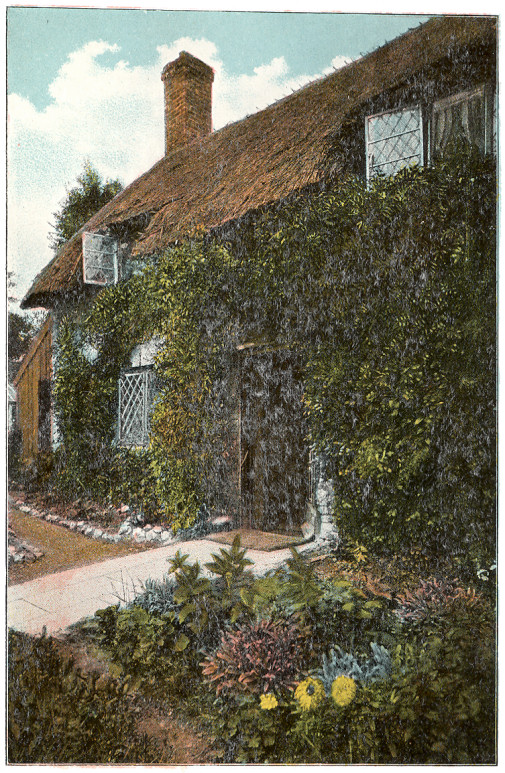
Little Jane's Cottage, Brading, circa 1910 – alluded to by the Rev Legh Richmond

The main street of Brading contains most of the facilities expected of a large village, or in Brading's case, small town. There are four pubs; The Bugle Inn where the sea almost met the High Street when Brading Haven was a major port, the Wheatsheaf Inn which faces the Bull Ring, The Kynges Well (formerly the Dark Horse) which is on the High Street and one at nearby Yarbridge named the Yarbridge Inn (known for many years as the Anglers Inn) which is famous for its selection of real ales. St. Mary's Church, Brading is at the north end of the town and the Methodist chapel is near the centre. There is a small supermarket, a post office, a newsagent, several other specialist shops, a hairdresser's and a fish and chip shop. In addition to these facilities, there is Brading Primary School.

Brading has many tourist attractions, but primarily the beach. These aldo include the Lilliput Doll and Toy Museum; and The Roman Villa at Morton with its protective cover (new in 2004) and interpretation centre.

There used to be the Brading Waxworks, a museum and waxworks exhibition housed in a Tudor pub (named as of 2005 'Brading: The Experience'). However, the attraction announced its closure in late 2009 as a result of falling visitor numbers and the increasing costs of running and maintaining the site. It was closed for good on 3 January 2010, and most of the vast collection of taxidermy pieces, historical artefacts and vehicles was auctioned off in April 2010.

The railway station building, as well as remaining an operational railway station has been restored as a café, railway memorabilia shop and small rail museum. The non-operational signal box has been restored to the state it may have been in during the steam era. It is staffed by volunteers.

== Sport and leisure ==
Brading has a Non-League football club Brading Town F.C., which plays at The Peter Henry Ground.

== Notable connections ==
The boards used in churches to display hymn numbers were invented here by the Rev Legh Richmond, who was curate-in-charge of Brading and Yaverland from 1757 to 1805, and a writer of inspirational evangelical pamphlets.

'Little' Jane Squibb was a devout Christian girl who attended the Reverend's weekly Sunday school at St Mary's Church, Brading. Her story is told in Rev Legh Richmond's Annals Of The Poor, under 'The Young Cottager'. She succumbed to the disease tuberculosis, known in those days as consumption, on 30 January 1799. Her death affected Rev Legh greatly. Her grave can be found in St Mary's Churchyard, Brading, and her cottage in The Mall, Brading.

Brading, fictionalised as "Barling", is the central location of Maxwell Gray's 1899 novel The House of Hidden Treasure.

The Victorian diarist Francis Kilvert visited Brading on the day of John Oglander's funeral and recorded details of his visit to Brading in his diary.

== Notable people ==
- Frederick Trumble (1893–1918), cricketer

== See also ==
- Hill Farmhouse
- List of current places of worship on the Isle of Wight
