= Oglander =

Oglander is a surname, and may refer to:

- Sir Henry Oglander, 7th Baronet (1811–1874)
- John Oglander (1585–1655), English politician and diarist
- Sir William Oglander, 1st Baronet (c.1611–1670)
- Sir William Oglander, 6th Baronet (1769–1852)
- Oglander baronets
