= William Oglander =

William Oglander may refer to

- Sir William Oglander, 1st Baronet (c. 1611–1670)
- Sir William Oglander, 3rd Baronet (c. 1680–1734), of the Oglander baronets
- Sir William Oglander, 5th Baronet (1733–1806), High Sheriff of Hampshire
- Sir William Oglander, 6th Baronet (1769–1852)

== See also ==
- Oglander, surname
