= Charlotte FitzRoy, Countess of Euston =

English noblewoman (1761–1808)

Charlotte FitzRoy
- Countess of Euston
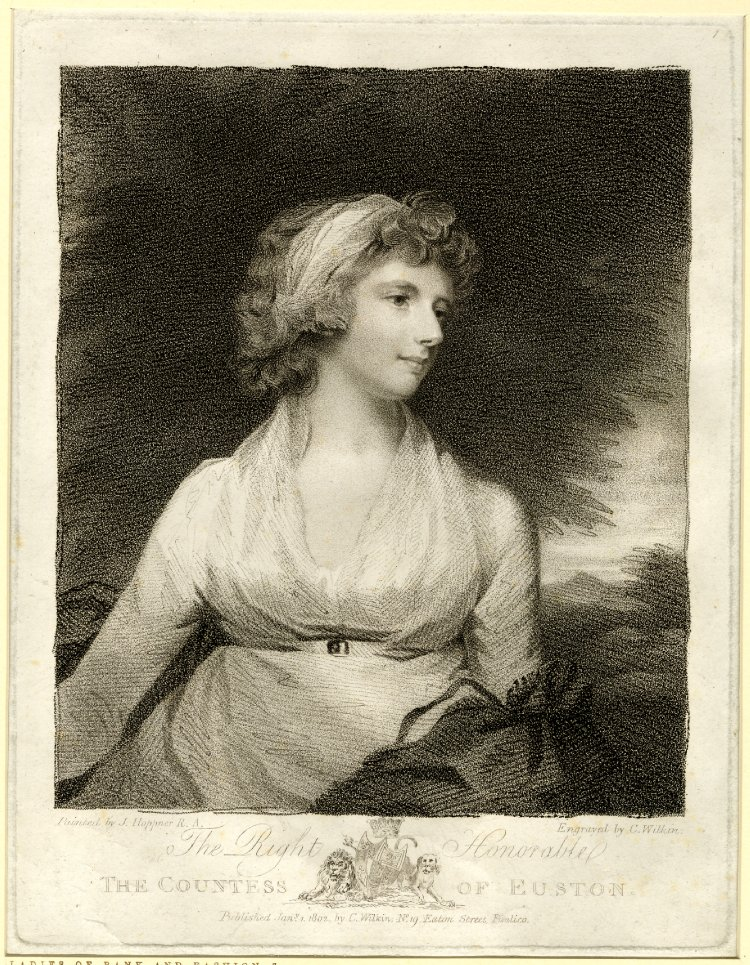
- Portrait by Charles Wilkin (c. 1800)
- Full name: Charlotte Maria FitzRoy
- Born: Lady Charlotte Maria Waldegrave; 11 October 1761
- Died: 1 February 1808 (aged 46); London, England
- Spouse: George FitzRoy, 4th Duke of Grafton (m. 1784)
- Issue: Lady Maria Oglander; Lady Elizabeth Smith; Henry FitzRoy, 5th Duke of Grafton; Lord Charles FitzRoy; Lady Isabella FitzRoy; Lord William FitzRoy; Lord Hugh FitzRoy; Lord Richard FitzRoy; Lord Richard FitzRoy; Lord James FitzRoy
- Parents: James Waldegrave, 2nd Earl Waldegrave; Maria Walpole

Charlotte FitzRoy, Countess of Euston (née Lady Charlotte Maria Waldegrave; 11 October 1761 – 1 February 1808), was the wife of George FitzRoy, 4th Duke of Grafton. Although she is sometimes referred to as "Duchess of Grafton", her husband did not inherit the dukedom until 1811, after his wife's death.

== Biography ==
She was a daughter of James Waldegrave, 2nd Earl Waldegrave, and his wife, the former Maria Walpole, the granddaughter of Robert Walpole, first Prime Minister of Great Britain. Maria later became Duchess of Gloucester and Edinburgh through her marriage to Prince William Henry, a grandson of King George II. The Prince became stepfather to Charlotte and her sisters in 1766, when he secretly married Maria at his house in Pall Mall.

Charlotte's elder sister was Elizabeth Waldegrave, Countess Waldegrave, whose children inherited the earldom. Charlotte's younger sister, Horatia, married Lord Hugh Seymour. The sisters were heiresses to the Waldegrave estates, including the manor of Whittlesey.

Charlotte married the future Duke of Grafton on 16 November 1784 at Navestock, Essex, when he was styled Earl of Euston. She was therefore known by the courtesy title Countess of Euston.

Their children were:

- Lady Maria Anne FitzRoy (1785-1855), who married Sir William Oglander, 6th Baronet, and had issue
- Lady Elizabeth Anne FitzRoy (1788–1867), who married her first cousin John Henry Smyth (Smyth's mother was Lady Georgiana Fitzroy, the duke's sister), and had issue
- Henry FitzRoy, 5th Duke of Grafton (1790–1863), who married Mary Caroline Berkeley (daughter of Admiral Sir George Cranfield Berkeley and granddaughter of Augustus Berkeley, 4th Earl of Berkeley), and had issue
- The Rt. Hon. Lt.-Col. Lord Charles Fitzroy (1791–1865), who married Lady Anne Cavendish (daughter of George Cavendish, 1st Earl of Burlington), and had issue
- Lady Isabella Frances FitzRoy (1792–1875), who married The Hon. Henry Joseph St. John (son of George St John, 3rd Viscount Bolingbroke), and had issue
- Lord James FitzRoy (1804–1834)

Several other children died in infancy or childhood:

- The Hon. William FitzRoy (1794–1804)
- The Hon. FitzRoy (1795–1797)
- The Hon. Richard FitzRoy (1798–1798)
- The Hon. Richard FitzRoy (1800–1801)

The countess's portrait was painted by Sir Joshua Reynolds and John Hoppner, among others.

Charlotte FitzRoy died at her home in Lower Brook Street, London, aged 45, of "a liver complaint and bilious fever", and was buried in the family vault. Her obituary described her as "an example of every thing amicable in woman".
