= Sandown Manor =

Manor house in Isle of Wight, United Kingdom

Sandown Manor (also Sande, 11th century; Sandham, 13th-18th century) is a manor house in the parish of Brading on the Isle of Wight.

== History ==
Sandown was held by Ulnod of the Confessor as an alod and was in the king's hands at the time of Domesday. It had passed before the middle of the 13th century to the Glamorgans of Wolverton, Philip de Glamorgan making grants of land there in 1236 and 1241. It seems at this early time to have been divided into North and South Sandown.

In 1236 Philip Glamorgan granted William Malet 2 virgates of land in Sandown in addition to land which William already held there, and about 1280 the heirs of Richard Malet held a quarter of a fee there of Robert de Glamorgan. A few years later John le Marche held this estate, which was evidently in North Sandown. From this time until the middle of the 14th century it would seem that the Glamorgans held the manor in demesne, as in 1316 Robert de Glamorgan was said to hold the vill of Sandown, while tenements in North and South Sandown, later called a manor, were held by John de Glamorgan at his death in 1337. In 1346, however, John Serle held the quarter fee which had formerly belonged to John le Martre (evidently the John le Marche mentioned above), and John Stower was in possession in 1428 and 1431. The manor apparently remained in this family until about the middle of the 16th century.

In 1552 Henry Stower sold the northern portion of the manor to William Jeffreys, who seven years later disposed of it to George Oglander, and with the Oglanders of Nunwell it remained as of 1912. Other portions of the manor were sold by John Stower to Kingswell, Knott, Knight and others.

In 1808 Sir William Oglander established his right to the manor of Sandown in an action against Winchester College, who had inclosed part of the waste land known as Ryal Heath.

The manor of Appley probably formed part of the northern manor of Sandown and was held at the close of the 13th century by William Malet of the manor of Gatcombe as half a fee. In 1609 Sir William Oglander died seised of the manor or farm of 'Apple' in North Sandown. Sir John Oglander, writing in 16th–17th century, calls it 'Appleford alias Apley now Sandam Ferme,' and says it anciently belonged to the Stower family. It was evidently always part of Sandown and has now become merged in it, even its name having disappeared.
