= George FitzRoy, 4th Duke of Grafton =

British politician (1760–1844)

His Grace The Duke of Grafton KG
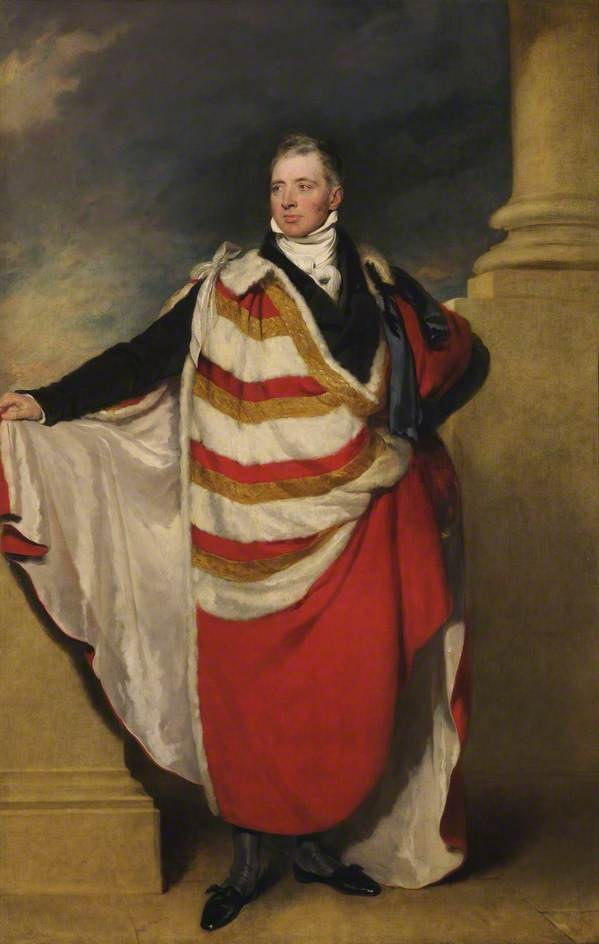
- Portrait by Thomas Lawrence, c. 1814-31

Member of Parliament for Cambridge University
- In office 1784–1811
- Preceded by: Sir James Mansfield
- Succeeded by: The Viscount Palmerston

Member of Parliament for Thetford
- In office 1782–1784
- Preceded by: Charles FitzRoy-Scudamore
- Succeeded by: George Jennings

Personal details
- Born: George Henry FitzRoy; 14 January 1760 London, England
- Died: 28 September 1844 (aged 84) Euston, Suffolk, England
- Spouse: Lady Charlotte Waldegrave (m. 1784; died 1808)
- Children: Lady Mary Oglander; Lady Georgiana FitzRoy; Lady Elizabeth Smyth; Henry FitzRoy, 5th Duke of Grafton; Lord Charles FitzRoy; Lady Isabella St. John; Lord William FitzRoy; Lord Hugh FitzRoy; Lord Richard FitzRoy; Lord Richard FitzRoy; Lord James FitzRoy
- Parent(s): Augustus FitzRoy, 3rd Duke of Grafton; The Hon. Anne Liddell

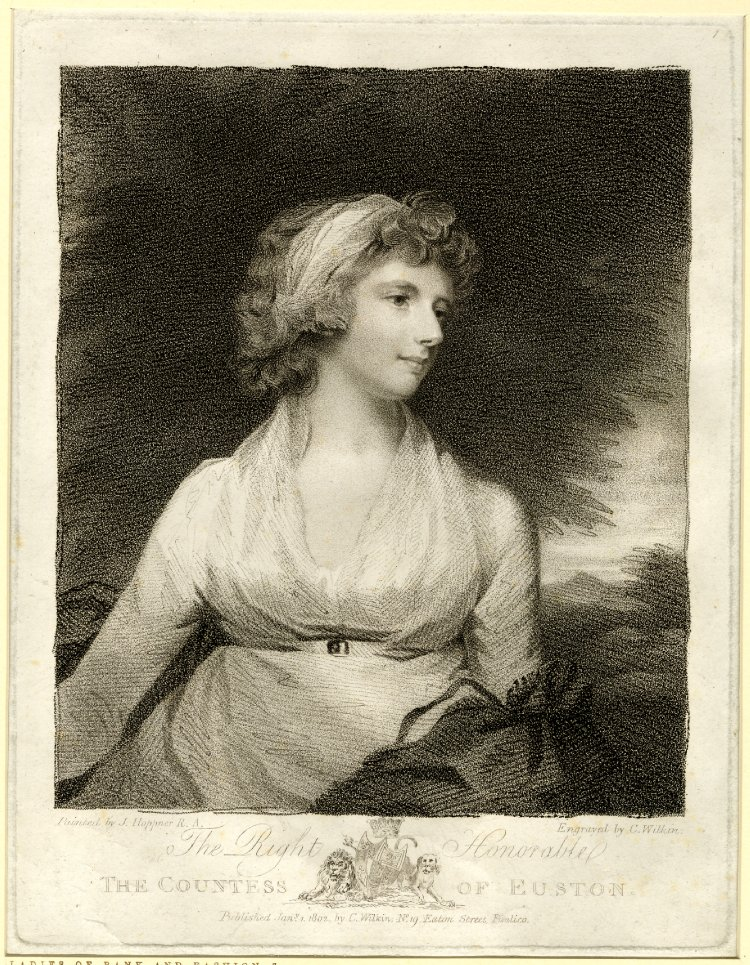
Charlotte Maria Waldegrave (c. 1800) by Charles Wilkin

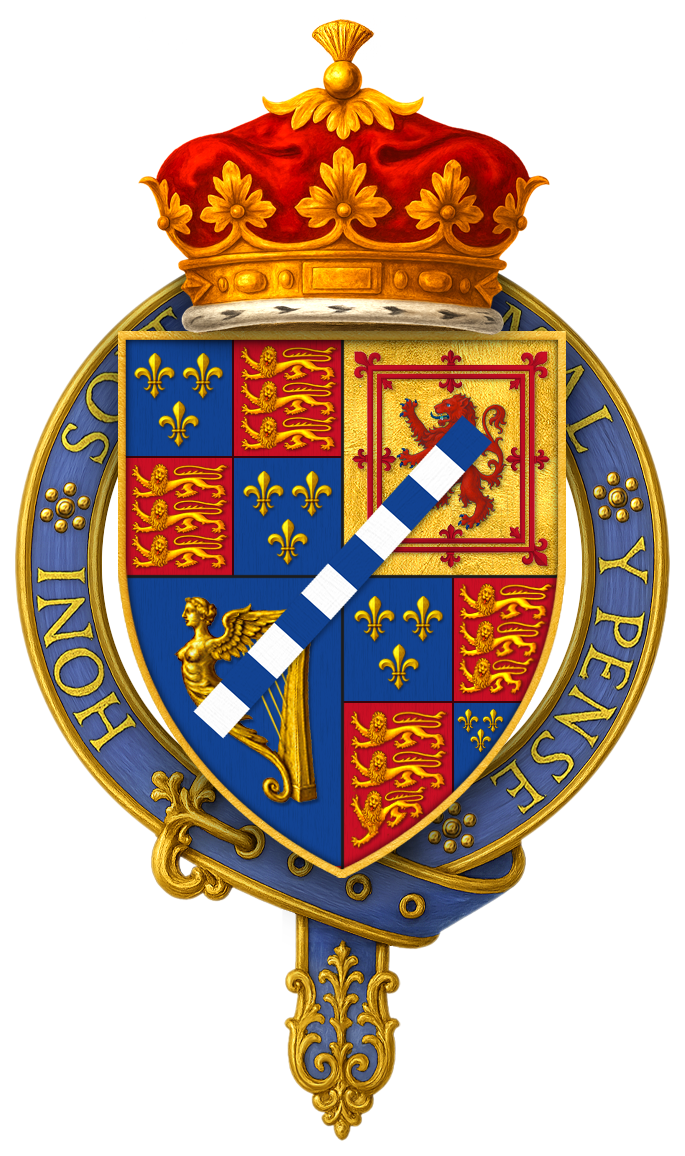
Garter-encircled arms George Henry FitzRoy, 4th Duke of Grafton, KG

George Henry FitzRoy, 4th Duke of Grafton (14 January 1760 – 28 September 1844), styled Earl of Euston until 1811, was a British Whig politician who sat in the British House of Commons from 1782 to 1811 when he succeeded to the Dukedom.

== Early life ==
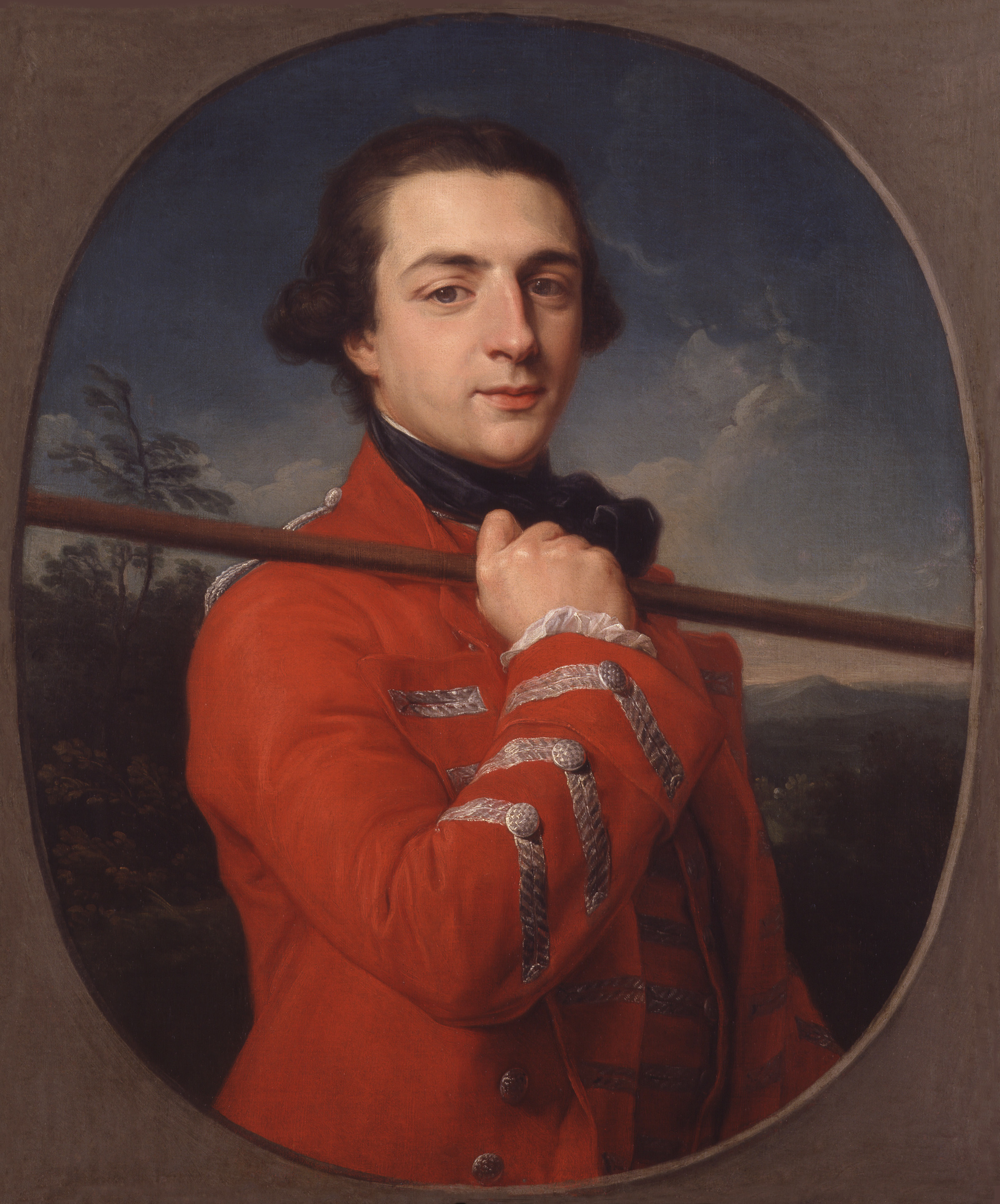
Portrait of the Duke of Grafton, 1762. His father, painted by Pompeo Batoni.

Euston was the son of Augustus FitzRoy, 3rd Duke of Grafton, and his wife, Anne Lidell. He was educated at Harrow School and Trinity College, Cambridge, where he became a close friend of the William Pitt the Younger. He married Lady Charlotte Maria Waldegrave (1761–1808), daughter of James Waldegrave, 2nd Earl Waldegrave, on 16 November 1784 at Navestock, Essex.

== Political career ==
From 1782 to 1784, Euston was Member of Parliament for Thetford, and in 1784, he and Pitt were elected as MPs for Cambridge University. Euston held that seat until he succeeded his father in the dukedom in 1811. Euston used his position in parliament to advocate for Britain having friendly relations with the newly created United States.

He succeeded his father as Colonel of the West Suffolk Militia on 2 June 1780 at the age of 20 and retained the command until 1808. He was appointed a deputy lieutenant of Northamptonshire on 9 May 1803. He also succeeded his father as Lord Lieutenant of Suffolk on 3 July 1790.

He was appointed a Knight Companion of the Garter (KG) in 1834.

== Family ==
Grafton died on 28 September 1844 and was succeeded by his son Henry. He and his wife Charlotte had eleven children:

- Lady Maria (Mary) Anne (1785–1855), married Sir William Oglander, 6th Baronet and had issue, including Sir Henry Oglander, 7th Baronet.
- Lady Georgiana (1787–1855), unmarried
- Lady Elizabeth Anne (1788–1867), married her first cousin John Henry Smyth and had issue, including John George Smyth and Henry Smyth. They were also great-grandparents of Gerald Robarts.
- Henry, styled Earl of Euston, later 5th Duke of Grafton (1790–1863)
- Lord Charles FitzRoy (1791–1865), married Lady Anne Cavendish (daughter of George Cavendish, 1st Earl of Burlington) and had issue.
- Lady Isabella Frances (1792–1875), married Henry Joseph St. John (died 1857)
- Hon. William FitzRoy (1794–1804)
- Hon. Hugh George FitzRoy (1795–1797)
- Hon. Richard FitzRoy (1798–1798)
- Hon. Richard FitzRoy (1800–1801)
- Lord James FitzRoy (1804–1834)

Parliament of Great Britain
Preceded by Charles FitzRoy-Scudamore; Richard Hopkins	Member of Parliament for Thetford; 1782–1784; With: Richard Hopkins	Succeeded by Sir Charles Kent; George Jennings
Preceded by Lord John Townshend; James Mansfield	Member of Parliament for Cambridge University; 1784–1801; With: William Pitt the Younger 1784–1801	Succeeded by Parliament of the United Kingdom
Parliament of the United Kingdom
Preceded by Parliament of Great Britain	Member of Parliament for Cambridge University; 1801–1811; With: William Pitt the Younger 1801–1806; Lord Henry Petty 1806–1807; Sir Vicary Gibbs 1807–1811	Succeeded by Sir Vicary Gibbs; The Viscount Palmerston
Military offices
Preceded by 3rd Duke of Grafton	Colonel of the West Suffolk Militia; 1780–1808	Succeeded by Sir William Parker, 7th Baronet
Honorary titles
Preceded by 3rd Duke of Grafton	Lord Lieutenant of Suffolk; 1790–1844	Succeeded by The Earl of Stradbroke
Peerage of England
Preceded by Augustus FitzRoy	Duke of Grafton; 1811–1844	Succeeded by Henry FitzRoy
