= Morton Manor =

Manor house in Brading, Isle of Wight, England

Coordinates: 50.6738°N 1.1472°W

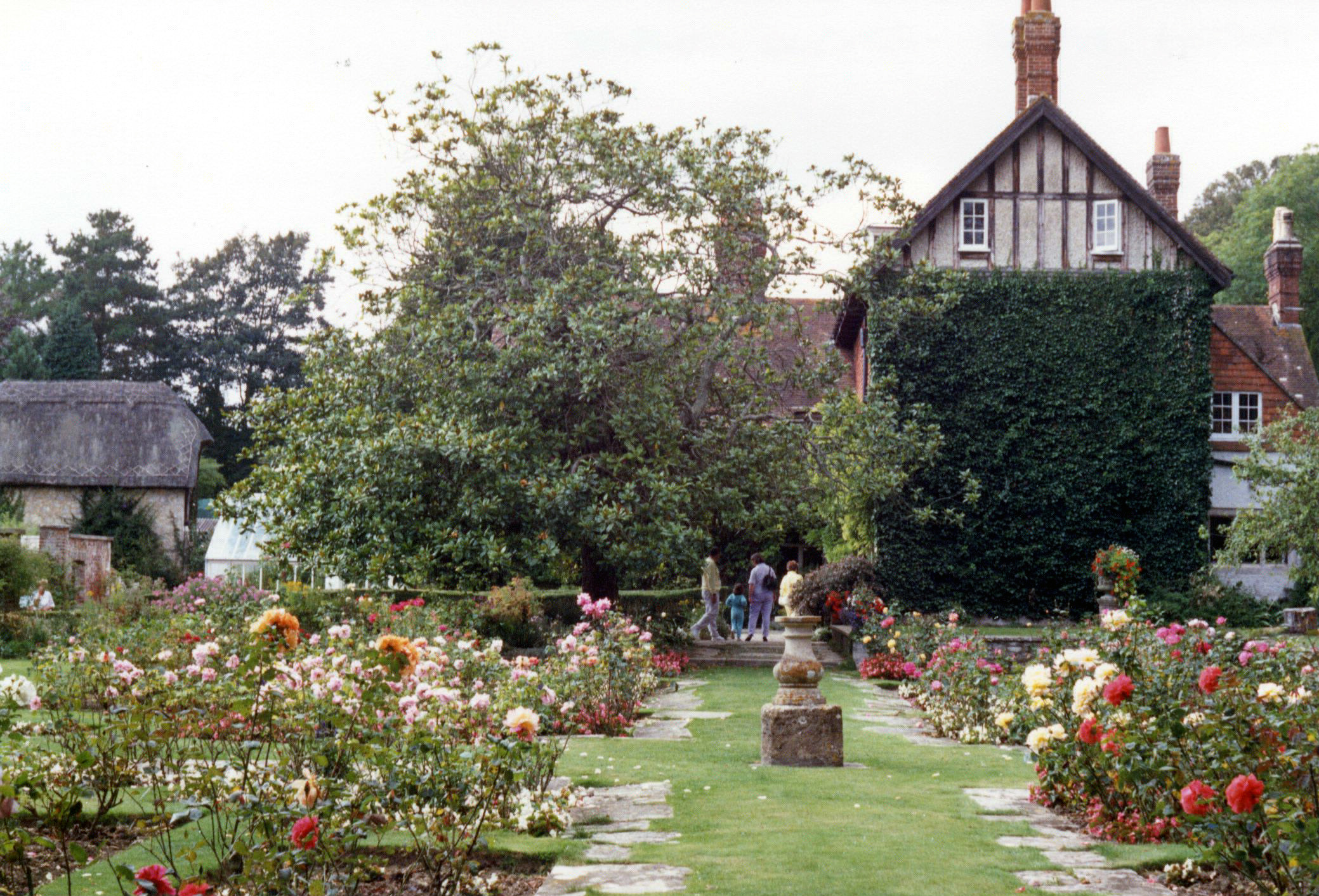
Morton Manor

Morton Manor (also La Morton or Mourton in the 13th century) is a manor house originating in the 13th century, in Brading, Isle of Wight, England. It is located 1 mile (1.6 km) southwest of Sandown Road. The fairly small 14th-century house was modified in the 19th century. Constructed of varied materials, it was refurbished and extended in the early 20th century in an Arts and Crafts style. The house has a Tudor fireplace in the dining room, with William De Morgan green glazed tiles, and the manor includes a small museum of rural life.

In 1998, a plaque was unveiled to commemorate the wartime service of members of the Women's Royal Naval Service. Morton Manor is listed Grade II on the National Heritage List for England. The granary is also Grade II listed.

== History ==
The manor consists of a narrow strip of land stretching south from the foot of the down by Yarbridge to the north end of Sandown Manor (q.v.), once known as Appley, and comprises Morton Villa, the farm under the down and the farm on the Brading road.

The identification of Morton with any Domesday holding can only be conjectural. The manor evidently formed part of the estate of the family of Aula, being held of Thomas de Aula's manor of Tothill in 1267–8, and subsequently of his descendants the Russells of Yaverland. Richard Malet of Hardingshute and Sandown appears to have been the tenant under these overlords, and he subinfeudated a messuage and a third of a carucate of land to Richard de Witvil or Wyvill. In 1267–8 difficulties arose between them as to which was liable for the service due to de Aula as chief lord. At the close of the century John Morin, Thomas Westbrook and John Wyvill were holding the estate in Morton of William Russell lord of Yaverland, and part afterwards seems to have passed to Thomas Aliners, who with others was in possession at the beginning of the 14th century. The Wyvills still retained their share, Thomas Wyvill and his coparceners holding the estate in 1346. In 1384–5 Richard Couper, one of the heirs of John Wyvill, released to Annora Wyvill, widow of John, all his right in land at Morton and elsewhere.

Part seems to have lapsed to the overlords before 1428 when Henry Veer and Joan Russell held the half fee. This Joan Russell was probably the widow of Sir Maurice Russell, and on her death it probably reverted to the owners of Yaverland, and is evidently to be identified with the manor of Brading mentioned in conveyances of Yaverland in 1488. The manor, which is sometimes called the manor of Brading and sometimes land in Brading, then descended with the manor of Yaverland until 1846, when it was sold to Sir William Oglander. As of 1912 it was owned by Mr. J. H. Oglander.

== Grounds ==
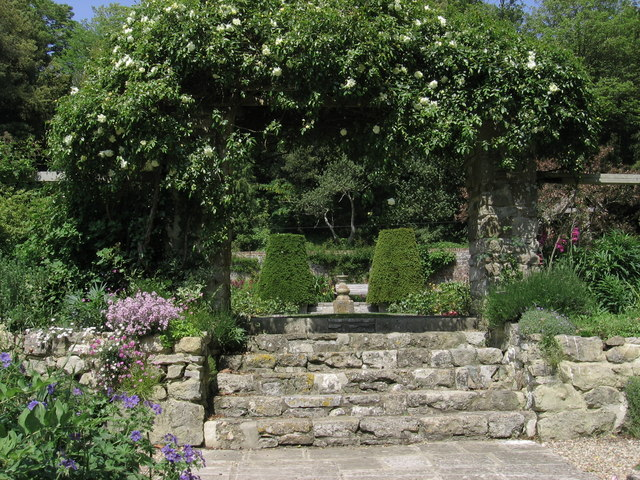
Gateway and steps at Morton Manor

The grounds contain 100 different varieties of Japanese maple. The sunken garden is of Elizabethan times while the terraces date to the 19th century. The terraced gardens led to a vineyard which produced white wine; Trzebski was the owner of Morton Manor vineyard which, as of 2008, no longer exists. The garden was the winner of the Isle of Wight In Bloom competition 12 times and Southern England in Bloom twice. Head Gardener Lindon Heaven started work at Morton Manor in 1987 while studying garden design and was mentored by the late Janusz Trzebski, their work on the garden won 12 awards over the south coast, Lindon Heaven last won the isle of wight best garden award in 2008 five years after the death of his mentor. Morton Manor gardens closed to the public on 2009.
