= Francis William Wilkin =

English painter

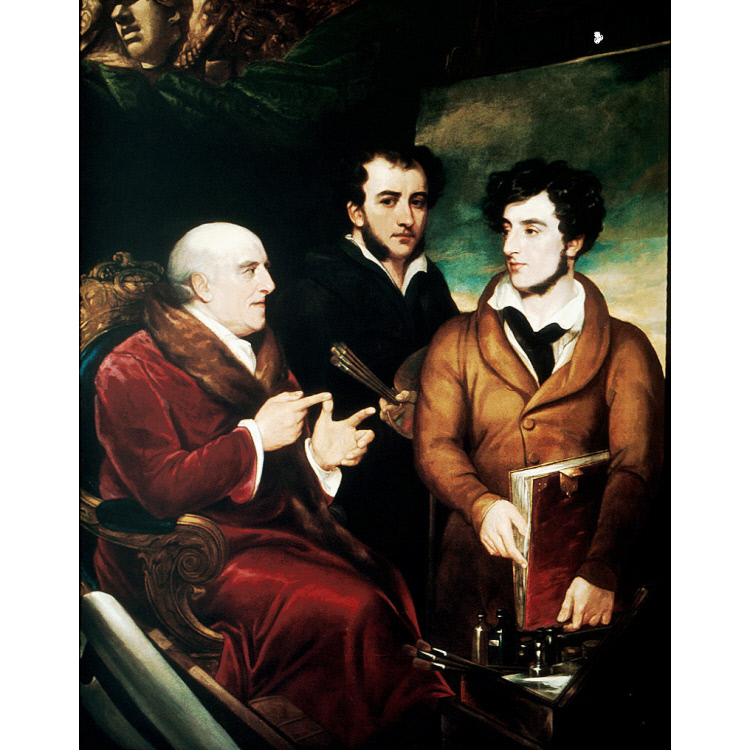
Frank William Wilkin - "Benjamin West, Frank Wilkin and Henry Wilkin" in the National Portrait Gallery

Francis William Wilkin aka Frank Wilkin (1791 - September 1842), was an English engraver and portrait painter, and the son of the engraver and painter, Charles Wilkin.

Henry William Paget, 1st Marquess of Anglesey

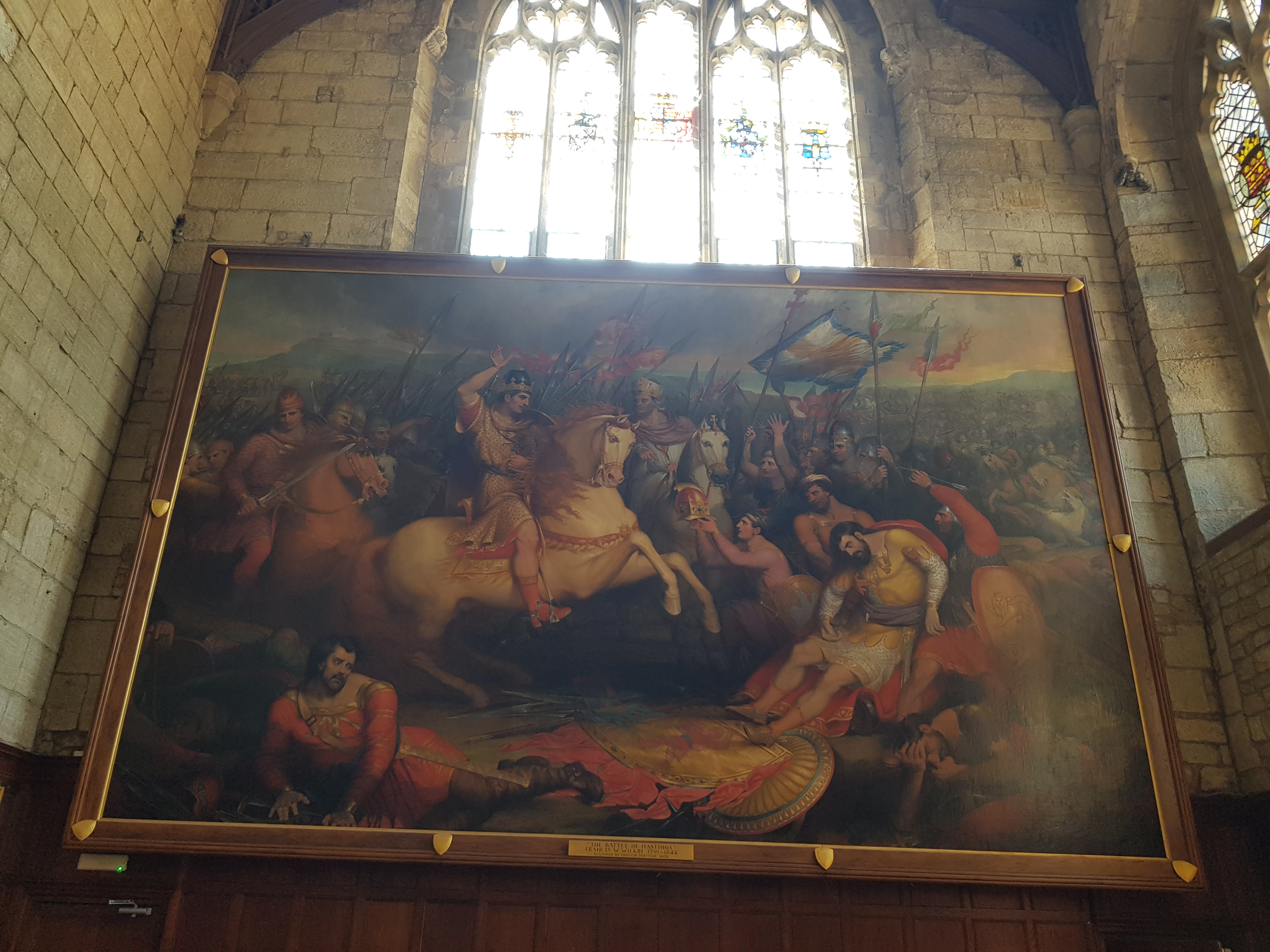
Wilkin's 1820 painting of the Battle of Hastings, commissioned by Sir Godfrey Webster. Currently hanging in the Abbot's Hall of Battle Abbey School, it is possibly the largest single canvas painting in the world.

His early works were miniatures. His later works in chalk were exhibited at the Royal Academy between 1820 and 1841. At one stage he was inclined to producing historical images, but the lukewarm reception given his commissioned 1820 painting, "The Battle of Hastings", discouraged him from pursuing this genre.

Henry William Paget, 1st Marquess of Anglesey, who was Wellington’s cavalry commander at the Battle of Waterloo, regularly gave painting commissions to Wilkin. The painting shown here had until quite recently been catalogued as a "portrait of an unknown military commander". The Order of the Garter star, the Waterloo Medal and the Hussars uniform, clearly identify this as a portrait of Paget.
