= The Dairyman's Daughter =

19th-century Christian religious booklet

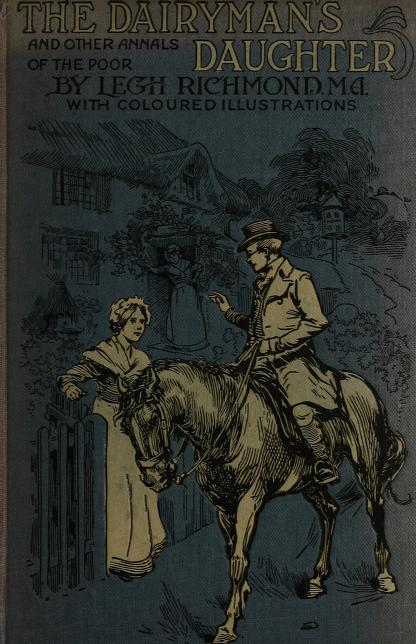
- Author: Legh Richmond
- Language: English
- Genre: Religious text
- Publisher: Religious Tract Society
- Publication date: 1814
- Publication place: United Kingdom
- Pages: 52

The Dairyman's Daughter is an early 19th-century Christian religious booklet of 52 pages, which had a remarkably wide distribution and influence. It was a narrative of the religious experience of Elizabeth Wallbridge, who was the person after whom the book was named.

== Elizabeth Wallbridge ==
Elizabeth Wallbridge, daughter of Joseph Wallbridge, was born, lived and died in the Parish of Arreton, Isle of Wight, England. Her parents were worthy, but lowly and poor, and their children put out to domestic service at an early age. The author of the narrative was Rev. Legh Richmond, a religious writer of the period, who was curate of the nearby Church of England parish of Brading.

According to the account in the book, Miss Wallbridge's life until the age of 26 was of a most worldly character. Although never immoral, she was wilful, proud, selfish and irreligious. However, her life was transformed by a sermon and she became very devout. With exceptional strength of mind, a retentive memory, the mastery of a few religious classics and enforced leisure because of illness, she devoted time and strength to the study of the Bible, in which she became remarkably knowledgeable. Miss Wallbridge died after a lingering sickness of a year and a half, on 30 May 1801, at the age of 31. During her illness Richmond often visited her and talked with her, and these discussions inspired him to write the book.

== Religious meaning of the book ==
Wallbridge´s spiritual experience, excepting its intensity, is portrayed as very normal and free of excess. She said,

"Often I mourn over my sins and sometimes have a great conflict, through unbelief, fear, temptation, to return to my old ways – I was laughed at by some, scolded by others, scorned by my enemies and pitied by my friends, but I forgave and prayed for my persecutors, and remembered how very lately I had acted this same part toward others myself."

The book portrays her religious experience not as morbid nor morose but winsome and cheerful. In the story, she met her serious difficulties with rare heroism, humility, altruism and unwavering faith in her Lord. It is this simplicity, the strength and normal character of her experience which gave the story such extensive influence.

== Publication and popularity ==
The Dairyman's Daughter was first issued in tract form in 1814 by the Religious Tract Society and in the same year by the New England Tract Society in Boston. The National Society in 1825 published it as Tract No. 9, and circulated at least half a million copies of this narrative, as the chief agency for its distribution in America.

In 1828, 14 years after its first publication, its circulation exceeded four million copies in 19 languages, and the number of conversions from its perusal were estimated in the thousands. Its popularity increased for several decades and it is estimated that over ten million copies have been distributed in many languages. Some writers have claimed that The Dairyman's Daughter has had a more extensive influence and a wider circulation than any other similar publication.

One chapter of a recent book surveying the history of the Religious Tract Society, Lutterworth Press and children's literature is devoted to The Dairyman's Daughter.

The success of the story led many to make the pilgrimage to Arreton to visit the grave of the Dairyman's Daughter, including Queen Victoria. The simple chair on which Miss Wallbridge sat when talking with Rev. Richmond was preserved and in 1836 sent to America, where it was given to the American Tract Society. Today, the chair is housed in the Texas Baptist Historical Collection as part of the American Tract Society archives. A chapel was erected in her memory on the main road between Arreton and Apse Heath. Now closed and converted into a residence, the foundation stone is still visible from the road.

In 1859, the American artist Jasper Francis Cropsey painted a work entitled The Cottage of the Dairyman's Daughter.

== Present-day influence ==
The book is now not widely known, although the short text of it has been reprinted innumerable times in various anthologies and publications.

The best-known memorial today to the Dairyman's Daughter in her home parish of Arreton is a pub of the same name, located close to Wallbridge's grave in the churchyard of St George's Church.
