= Legh Richmond =

English clergyman and writer (1772–1827)

Legh Richmond MA
- Born: 29 January 1772; Liverpool
- Died: 8 May 1827 (aged 55); Turvey, Bedfordshire
- Occupation: Clergyman
- Years active: 1797-1827
- Known for: Religious writing
- Notable work: The Dairyman's Daughter

Legh Richmond (1772–1827) was a Church of England clergyman and writer. He is noted for tracts, narratives of conversion that innovated in the relation of stories of the poor and female subjects, and which were subsequently much imitated. He was also known for an influential collection of letters to his children, powerfully stating an evangelical attitude to childhood of the period, and by misprision sometimes taken as models for parental conversation and family life, for example by novelists, against Richmond's practice.

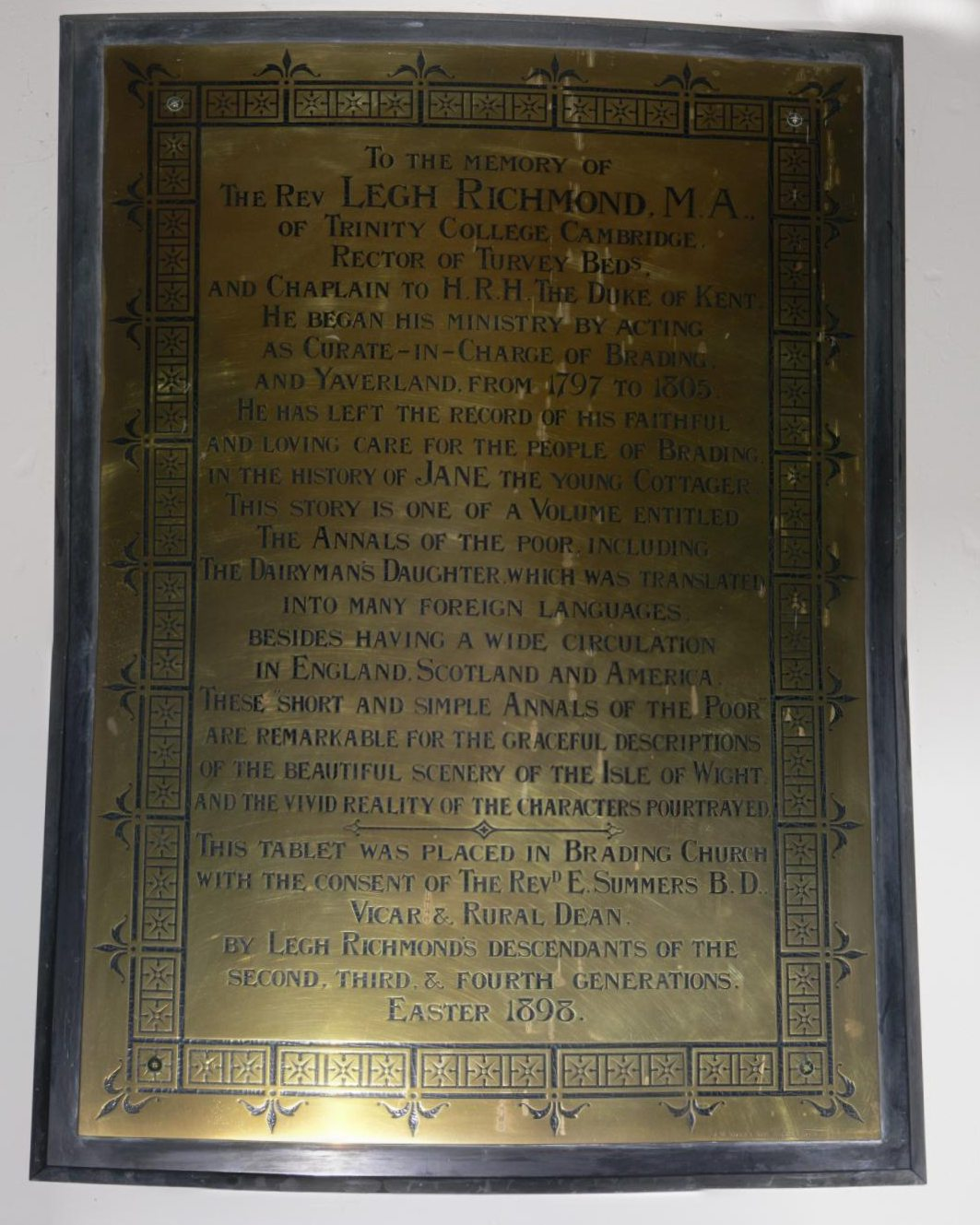
Plaque in Brading church commemorating Richmond and his work

== Life ==
He was born on 29 January 1772, in Liverpool, the son of Henry Richmond, physician and academic, and his wife Catherine Atherton. He was educated at Trinity College, Cambridge, was ordained deacon in June 1797 and took his MA in July of the same year. On 24 July 1797, two days after marrying Mary Chambers, he was appointed to the joint curacies of St. Mary's Church, Brading and St. John the Baptist Church, Yaverland on the Isle of Wight. He was ordained priest in February 1798.

Richmond was powerfully influenced by William Wilberforce's Practical View of Christianity, and took a prominent interest in the British and Foreign Bible Society, the Church Missionary Society, the London Society for Promoting Christianity amongst the Jews and similar institutions.

In 1805 Richmond became assistant-chaplain to the Lock Hospital, London, for a short period. Later that year he was appointed rector of Turvey, Bedfordshire, as successor to Erasmus Middleton. The patron, Sarah Fuller, consulted Ambrose Serle; who recommended Richmond. He remained at Turvey for the rest of his life. He began taking pupils at the rectory, two being Charles Longuet Higgins and Walter Augustus Shirley, while teaching his own sons, but was not effectual and passed tuition on to his curates.

Richmond was instrumental in unmasking the imposter Ann Moore, the "fasting woman" of Tutbury, in 1813. In 1814 he was appointed chaplain to Prince Edward, Duke of Kent and Strathearn (1767–1820), father of Queen Victoria.

Richmond died on 8 May 1827. His funeral sermon was preached by the Rev. Thomas Fry of Emberton, a close friend.

== Legacy ==
Richmond was one of the first clergymen to found a village Friendly Society. The Turvey Friendly Society was formed to give wages to the poor when they were sick and could not work.

== Works ==
It was in Turvey that Richmond began to write stories based on material he had collected while living in the Isle of Wight. These were simple tales about country folk. The Dairyman's Daughter was the first published, followed by The Young Cottager and The Negro Servant. All were originally published in the Christian Guardian between 1809 and 1814. The best known of his writings is The Dairyman's Daughter, of which as many as four millions in nineteen languages were circulated before 1849. A collected edition of his stories of village life was first published by the Religious Tract Society in 1814 under the title of Annals of the Poor. Sixteen years after Richmond's death, the engraver George Brannon published a supplement to Annals of the Poor under the title The Landscape Beauties of the Isle of Wight (1843).

Richmond also edited a series of Reformation theological works, with biographies, in eight volumes called Fathers of the English Church (1807–12).

=== Tracts ===
- The Dairyman's Daughter
- The history of little Jane, the young cottager
- The Negro servant
- A Visit to the Infirmary
- The history of Mary Watson & Jenny Mortimer, two Sunday-School girls : founded on facts
- The African widow; being the history of a poor black woman : showing how she grieved for the death of her child, and the consequences of her doing so.
- Annals of the Poor, 1814
- The Orphan (for a juvenile audience)

=== Other ===
- Memoir of Miss Hannah Sinclair, (eldest daughter of the Right Hon. Sir John Sinclair, bart.) who died, May 22, 1818.
- Walk circumspectly; or, Rules for Christian Conduct
- Is the 'doctrinal, practical, experimental' system of the Rev. Legh Richmond, the 'true, Scriptural, Evangelical Religion,' as it professes to be, while all others are mere imitations and assumptions of that title?. (London, 1829)

=== Books ===
- The Fathers of the English Church: or, A selection from the writings of the reformers and early protestant divines of the Church of England, series edited Richmond. This series appeared in eight volumes, from 1807 to 1812, was unsuccessful in financial terms, leaving Richmond with debts, which were met by supporters in 1814. The work of republication was later taken up by the Parker Society.

=== Sermons ===
- A Sermon [on Luke xiii. 3] preached in the Parish Church of Brading ... on February 27, 1799, being the Day appointed for a General Fast.
- A Sermon [on Gen. i. 26] on the sin of cruelty towards the brute creation; preached ... February 15, 1801.
- A Sermon [on John xxi. 16] preached at the Parish Church of St. Andrew by the Wardrobe and St. Anne, Blackfriars, on Tuesday in Whitsun week, May 23, 1809, before the Society for Missions to Africa and the East, instituted by members of the Established Church, being their ninth anniversary.
- Reflections, suggested by the close of the year : being a sermon preached at Brading in the Isle of Wight, on the last Sunday of the year.

=== Letters ===
The following items are also listed in WorldCat.

- Letter from Legh Richmond to Samuel Hope (1815)
- Letter from Legh Richmond to Thomas Burgess (1816)
- 2 letters from Legh Richmond to William Wilberforce (1803,1804)
- Letter from Legh Richmond to Samuel Whitbread (1814)
- Letter from Legh Richmond to Harris Cawes (1806)
- Letter from Legh Richmond to Lord Bolton (1803)
- Letter from Legh Richmond to Rev. S. Hillyard
- Letter from Legh Richmond to Rev. W. Renton (1825)
- Letter from Legh Richmond to Chauncy Hare Townshend
- Letter from Legh Richmond to Joseph John Gurney (1826)
- Autograph letter signed : Brading, Isle of Wight, to Hannah More, 1804 Jan. 17.
- Autograph letter signed : to Mr. Relfe, 1826 Feb. 6.
- Legh Richmond letters, 1807-1815

== Biographers ==
Numerous lives of Richmond have been published. Domestic Portraiture (1833) by his close friend Thomas Fry related to the Richmond household, and in particular the two oldest sons. The Rev. Legh Richmond's letters and counsels to his children (1848), edited by his daughter Fanny Richmond,, drew on Domestic Portraiture. A life by John Ayre was included in editions of Annals of the Poor.

- Memoirs of the Rev. Legh Richmond, A.M. (first edition 1828), by Thomas Shuttleworth Grimshawe. It was disliked by Samuel Wilberforce on theological grounds, for its handling of baptismal regeneration. As part of the wider debate on evangelicalism, the British Critic in 1830 reviewed positively an anonymous hostile pamphlet on Richmond's doctrine provoked by Grimshawe's biography, and addressed to William Wilberforce.
- By Gregory T. Bedell (1829)
- Life ... compiled from authentic sources (1842) published for the Methodist Episcopal Church is attributed to Stephen B. Wickens.

== Family ==
Richmond in 1797 married Mary Chambers (died 1873), daughter of James William Chambers of Bath. They had 12 children, of whom eight survived their father. Two of the sons, Nugent and Wilberforce, died in 1825.

- Mary Catherine, eldest daughter. She married in 1822 the Rev. James Marshall (1796–1855), and was mother of Sir James Marshall (1829–1889).
- Frances (Fanny), the second daughter, married George Farish, a barrister. She was widowed, and then married the Rev. James L. Harris.
- Henrietta Anne, the third daughter, married the Rev. John Ayre in 1825.
- Samuel Nugent Legh, eldest son.
- Thomas Henry Wilberforce, second son, died 16 January 1825.
- Henry Sylvester, died 1872, third son, became rector of Wyck Rissington.
- Legh Brooke
- Catherine, married T. D. Close.
- Legh Serle, married first Cecelia, daughter of Alexander Cheyne, and secondly Georgiana, daughter of Thomas Shuttleworth Grimshawe.
- Charlotte Elizabeth, married the Rev. Charles Bowen of Chester
- Theophilus Pelatt, M.D., died in Demerara in 1838 at age 23.
- Atherton.

== Sources ==
- Lee, Sidney, ed. (1896). "Richmond, Legh" . Dictionary of National Biography. Vol. 48. London: Smith, Elder & Co.
