= Ambrose Serle =

Under-Secretary of State for the Colonies

Personal details
- Born: 30 August 1742
- Died: 1 August 1812 (aged 69)
- Children: Jane Sale (1780–1792)

Ambrose Serle (1742–1812) was an English official, diarist and writer of Christian prose and hymns.

== Life ==
Serle was born on 30 August 1742, and entered the Royal Navy. In 1764, while living in or near London, Serle became a friend of William Romaine. Other friends of his among the evangelicals were John Thornton, John Newton, Augustus Toplady, and Legh Richmond.

When William Legge, 2nd Earl of Dartmouth became Secretary of State for the Colonies in 1772, Serle was appointed one of his under-secretaries, and in January 1776 he was made clerk of reports. He went to the Thirteen Colonies in 1774, and accompanied the British Army from 1776 to 1778. In 1776 William Tryon gave him control of the political section of the New-York Gazette, which he held from September 1776 to July 1777.

On returning from America in 1780, Serle settled at Heckfield, Hampshire. In 1795 he was a commissioner of the transport service and the care of prisoners of war, and was reappointed in 1803 and 1809.

Serle died on 1 August 1812, and was buried in the churchyard at Broadwater, West Sussex. He was married, and a daughter Jane (1780–1792) was Mrs. Romaine's goddaughter.

== Works ==
Serle was the author of Americans Against Liberty (1775), a pamphlet published anonymously that defended the British Empire as a rightful and just government, arguing against the rebellious American colonists of the American Revolution on religious grounds. It also criticizes the American colonists as enemies of the British public, and opponents of the freedoms provided by Great Britain.

The American Journal of Ambrose Serle, Secretary to Lord Howe 1776-1778 is a primary source in the history of the American Revolution. Serle was the private secretary to the British general William Howe.

Serle also wrote two well-known devotional books. Horae Solitariae: Essays upon some remarkable Names and Titles of Jesus Christ occurring in the Old Testament, and a second volume, were published some time after 1780, and had a second edition in 1787. The Christian Remembrancer was published in 1787.

== Notes ==
Attribution

This article incorporates text from a publication now in the public domain: Lee, Sidney, ed. (1897). "Serle, Ambrose". Dictionary of National Biography. Vol. 51. London: Smith, Elder & Co.
