= James Marshall (minister) =

Scottish clergyman (1796–1855)

James Marshall (1796–1855) was a Scottish minister of the Church of Scotland from 1818 to 1841, and from 1842 of the Church of England.

== Life ==
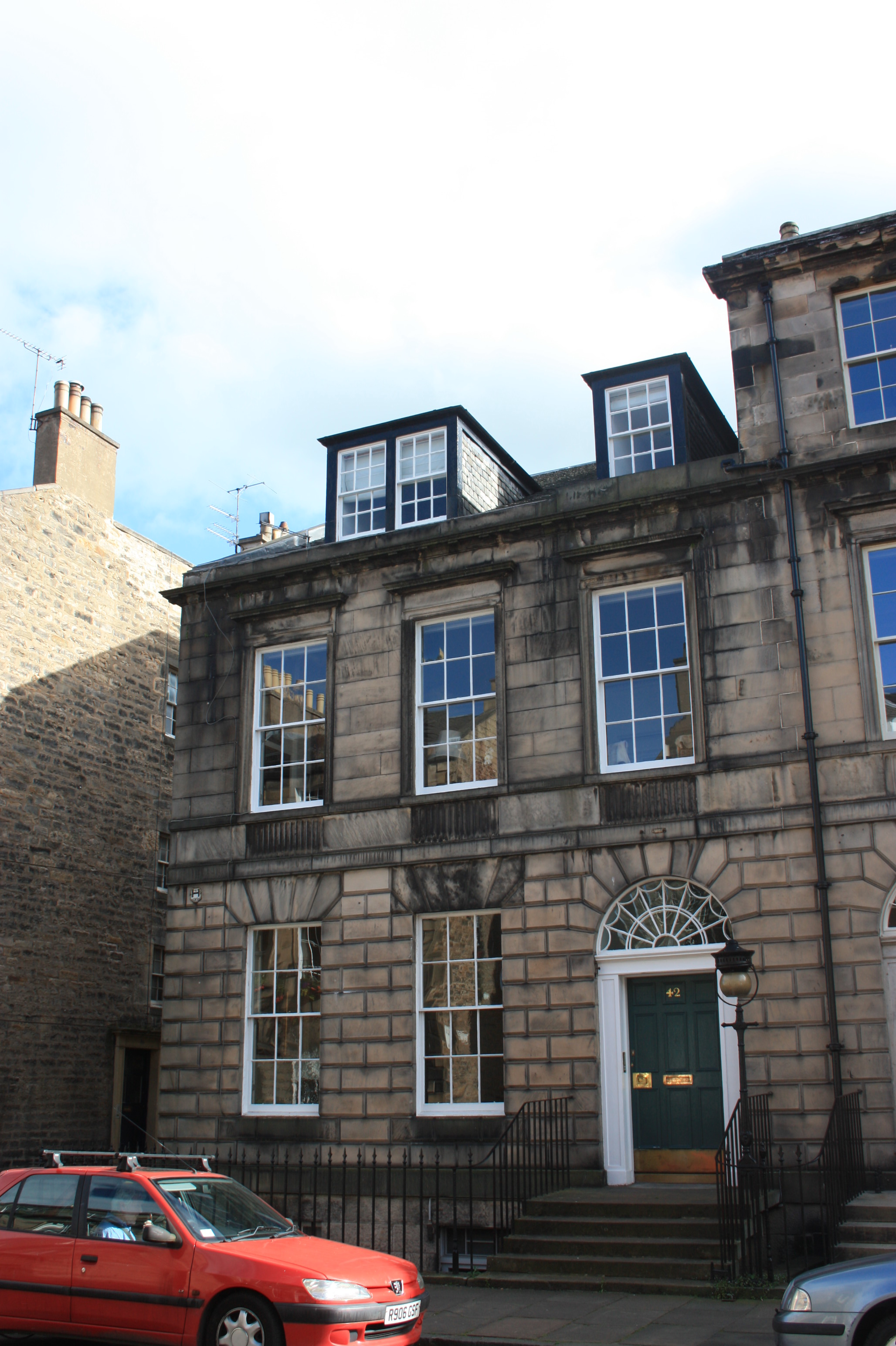
42 Northumberland Street, Edinburgh

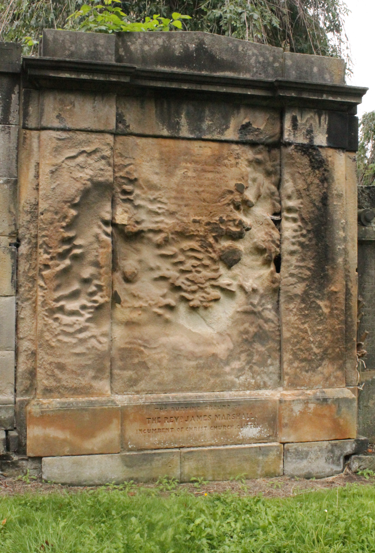
The Marshall family grave, St Cuthbert's Churchyard

Born at Rothesay, Bute, on 23 February 1796, he was the son of Hugh Marshall, a doctor who died in 1806, and his wife Elizabeth Wilson. The family moved to Paisley, and he was educated at Paisley grammar school, the University of Glasgow and the University of Edinburgh.

On 2 September 1818 Marshall was licensed to preach by the presbytery of Glasgow; his calm preaching style was noticed by Thomas Chalmers. First assisting his mother's friend, Dr. Robert Balfour, at the Outer High Church, Glasgow, he succeeded to Balfour's charge at his death in 1819. In 1828 he was appointed by the Edinburgh town council to the Tolbooth Kirk. In the 1840s Rev Marshall was living at 42 Northumberland Street in Edinburgh's Second New Town. Members of his family dying within this period are buried in St Cuthberts Churchyard at the west end of Princes Street.

Before the Disruption of 1843 in the Church of Scotland, Marshall generally sympathised with non-intrusionist party; but in the event he broke with the Free Church and became an Anglican. He sent in his resignation to the presbytery of Edinburgh on 29 September 1841, and, after being confirmed by Charles Terrot, the Bishop of Edinburgh, was ordained by Edward Maltby, the Bishop of Durham as curate to William Stephen Gilly at Norham (19 December). He took priest's orders on 6 February 1842, and was appointed to the rectory of St. Mary-le-Port, Bristol.

In 1845 Marshall became secretary to the newly founded Lay Readers' Association. In May 1847 he was appointed by the Simeon Trustees to the living of Christ Church, Clifton Down, which he held till his death.

After three years of bad health, Marshall died on 29 August 1855 at his house, Vyvyan Terrace, Clifton, Bristol, and was buried on 4 September in the Clifton parish church burial-ground.

== Works ==
Marshall published sermons and addresses, Inward Revival, or Motives and Hindrances to Advancement in Holiness, Edinburgh, 1840, and Early Piety illustrated in the Life and Death of a Young Parishioner, both popular works. He also edited the Letters (1839) of Isabella Graham, his aunt.

== Family ==
Marshall married in 1822 Catherine Mary, daughter of Legh Richmond. Sir James Marshall was their son.

The monument to Marshall's wife and children lies in St Cuthbert's Churchyard at the west end of Princes Street Gardens in central Edinburgh. The sandstone face of the memorial is heavily eroded and only Rev James Marshall's name (as owner of the plot) is legible.
