= St John the Baptist Church, Yaverland =

Church in Yaverland, England

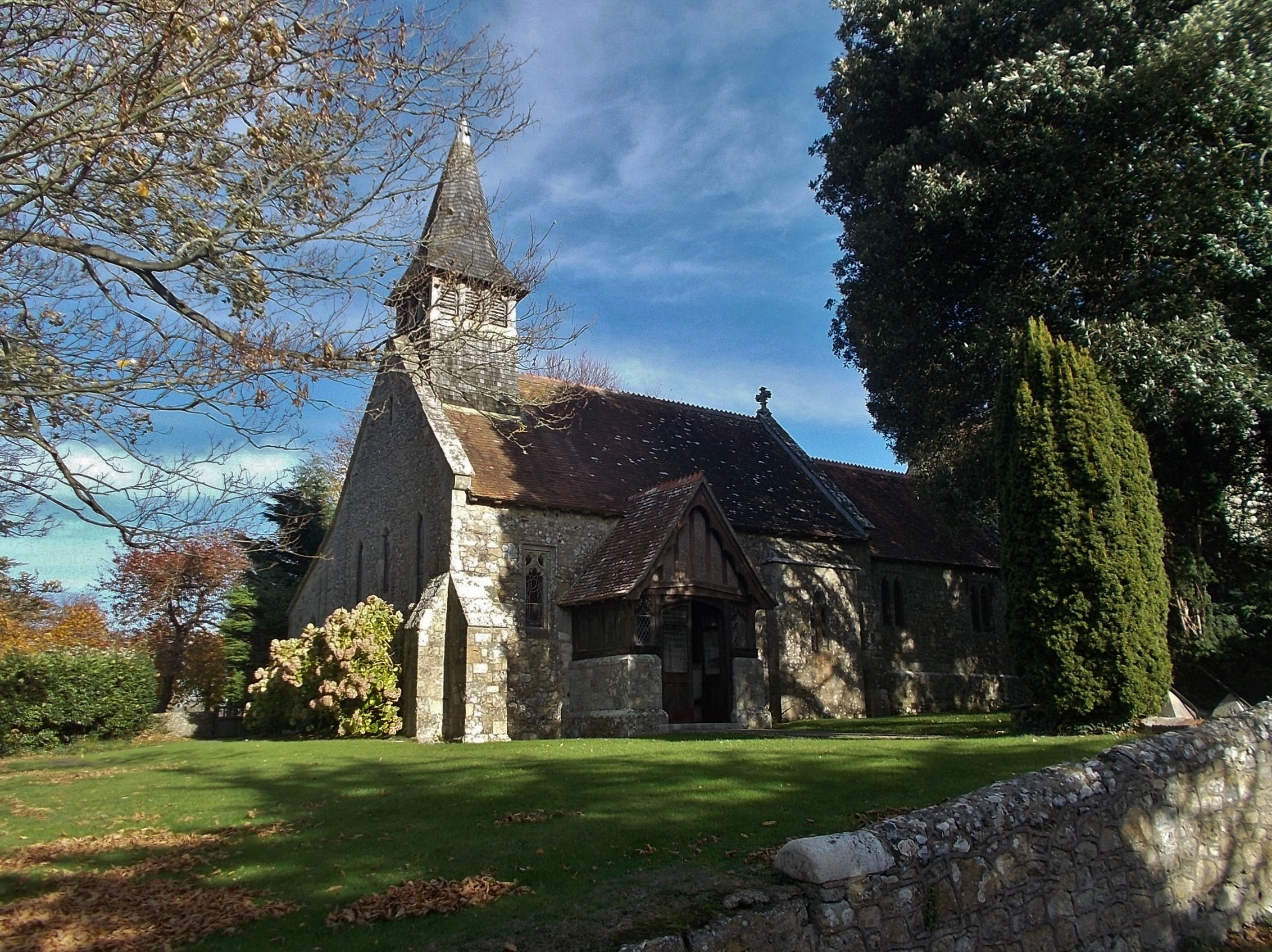
- St John the Baptist Church, Yaverland
- 50°40′11″N 01°07′58″W
- Denomination: Church of England
- Churchmanship: Broad Church

History
- Dedication: St John the Baptist

Administration
- Province: Canterbury
- Diocese: Portsmouth
- Parish: Yaverland

St John the Baptist Church, Yaverland is a parish church in the Church of England located in Yaverland, Isle of Wight.

== History ==
The Grade I listed parish church of Yaverland dates from the twelfth century and is a gem of late Norman architecture. Although restored in the 19th century, it is the only church on the Isle of Wight that remains essentially Norman.

Till the causeway to Yarbridge was built by Sir William Russell, who was Lord of the Manor and Captain of the Island in the reign of Edward l, Yaverland was an Island, and it was only possible for the inhabitants to get to their Parish Church at Brading by making a long roundabout journey.

For this reason the Norman family of de Aula, who built Yaverland Manor, built also a private chapel, the present church.

It was built in the 1140s, and the entrance arch and the chancel arch, which are late Norman, date from this period. The pattern of paterae in the diaper work of tympanum of the former is a noticeable feature.

In the latter part of the 13th Century the Manor came into the possession of the Russell family through marriage with the de Aula heiress, and in this century the Early English arch in the south wall of the nave, and the plate traceried window within it were added, perhaps to give room for a side altar, perhaps to form the Russell Chantry mentioned in the Dean of Winchester's return in 1305, but no foundations have been discovered outside. The central window in the west wall of the nave dates from this time.

In the 15th century, between 1447 and 1486, the chapel became a parish church, separated from Brading Parish, but still somewhat subservient to it, for Sir John Oglander writes in his "Memoirs" that "at Christmass and Easter ye P'son of Yaverland wase injoyned to come with his whole p'risch, and to administer ye cupp; he wase to reade ye fyrst lesson, to fynde 2 loade of strawe yerely to laye in ye seates, 6 lbs. of candels, and 10s. yerely in moneys, and to acknowledge Bradinge for theyre mother church".

To the 15th Century belong the square mullioned windows (Perpendicular) in the chancel; the hagioscope (or squint) south of the chancel arch, which gives a view of the altar from what may have been a side altar; and the opening above the pulpit on the north side of the altar for the rood loft. The remains of the steps up to it open from the chancel side, and the outer moulding of the chancel arch above the capitals has been cut away to make room for the rood beam.

In Henry Vlll's reign the church was used as a Garrison Church, and has been so used ever since, serving the troops stationed in the forts. The church was restored by Ewan Christian in 1889 by the liberality of the Rector, Nelson Palmer, and the north aisle and vestries were added as well as some of the windows in the nave. The reredos, of alabaster, designed by C.E. Ponting and Edward Frampton, and executed by Earp, of Lambeth, was the gift of Mr Palmer.

The east window and that in the arched recess are by Clayton and Bell; the chancel windows, St Michael in the west wall and the west aisle window, by Frampton; the windows in the south wall of the nave, by John Hardman & Co.; St Raphael and St Gabriel in the west wall of the nave and the window in the west wall of the aisle, by Burlison and Grylls; the east aisle window by Wailes and Strang.

The Communion Plate is dated 1733. The Registers date from 1632.

Note:- (i) A Norman Cooking pot of 1150 A.D. found at the restoration in 1889. (ii) the Holy Water Stoup (15th Century) by the door. (iii) the grinning face, commonly called the Monk's Head, of unknown origin, above the entrance arch. (iv) the "Shepherd's Sundial" to the west of the doorway. (v) the Consecration Cross on the right jamb of the doorway.

=== List of incumbents ===
- Legh Richmond 1798–1805

== Parish Status ==
The church is within the Haven Benefice which includes:

- St John the Baptist Church, Yaverland
- St Mary's Church, Brading
- St Peter's Church, Seaview
- St Helen's Church, St Helens, Isle of Wight

== Organ ==
The church has a pipe organ by William Hill & Sons dating from 1889. A specification of the organ can be found on the National Pipe Organ Register.

== Gallery ==
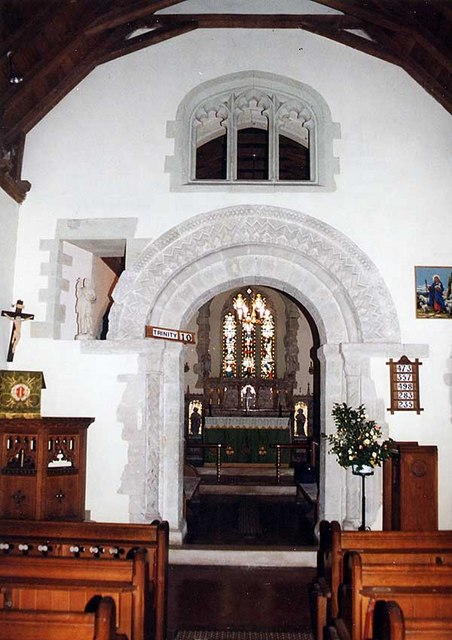
East end

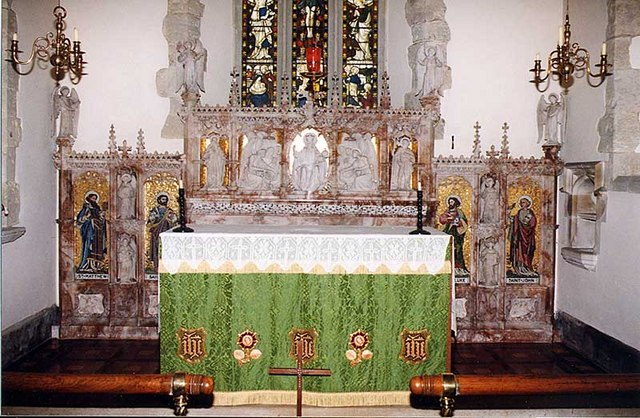
Sanctuary

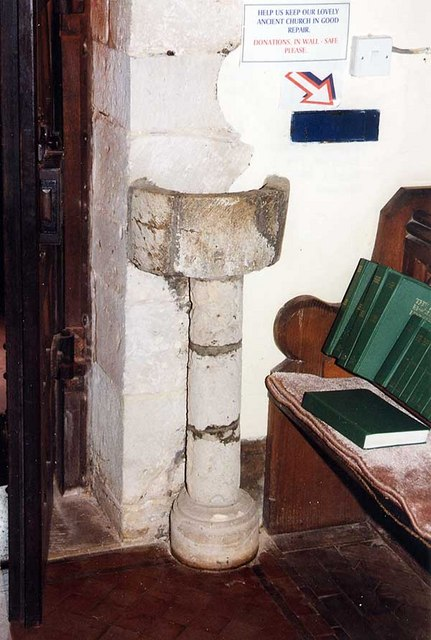
Stoup
