= Thomas Shuttleworth Grimshawe =

Thomas Shuttleworth Grimshawe (1778–1850), was an English biographer and Anglican priest.

== Life ==
Grimshawe was the son of John Grimshaw, solicitor, and five times mayor of Preston. He was born at Preston in 1778. He entered Brasenose College, Oxford, 9 April 1794, and proceeded B.A. in 1798, and M.A. in 1800. He was vicar of Biddenham, Bedfordshire, from 1808 to 1850, and with this living he held the rectory of Burton Latimer, Northamptonshire, from 1809 to 1843.

He died on 17 February 1850, and was buried in the chancel of Biddenham Church, where there was a monument to his memory.

== Works ==
Grimshawe's first publication was 'The Christian's Faith and Practice,' &c. (Preston, 1813); followed by 'A Treatise on the Holy Spirit' (1815). In 1822 he wrote a pamphlet on 'The Wrongs of the Clergy of the Diocese of Peterborough,' which was noticed by Sydney Smith in the 'Edinburgh Review' (article 'Persecuting Bishops').

In 1825 he issued 'An Earnest Appeal to British Humanity in behalf of Indian Widows.' His 'Memoir of the Rev. Legh Richmond,' a religious biography, was first published in 1828, and it reached an eleventh edition by 1846. His major work was the 'Life and Works of William Cowper,' 8 vols. 1835, and several times subsequently republished, the last edition bearing the imprint 'Boston, U.S., 1853.' He published also a small volume of 'Lectures on the Future Restoration and Conversion of the Jews,' 1843, and several occasional sermons.

== Family ==
Grimshawe married Charlotte Anne, daughter of George Livius of Cauldwell Priory, Bedfordshire; and their son, Charles Livius Grimshawe, was High Sheriff of Bedfordshire in 1866.
