= Isabella St. John =

Lady Isabella St John
- Born: Lady Isabella Frances FitzRoy; May 6, 1792; England
- Died: August 27, 1875 (aged 83)
- Known for: Short story writer
- Spouse: Henry Joseph St. John (m. 1829; died 1857)
- Children: Antonia St John
- Parents: George Henry FitzRoy, 4th Duke of Grafton (father); Lady Charlotte Waldegrave (mother)

Lady Isabella Frances St. John (née FitzRoy; 6 May 1792 – 27 August 1875) was a British novelist, short story writer, and poet.

She was born on 6 May 1792, the daughter of George Henry FitzRoy, 4th Duke of Grafton and Lady Charlotte Waldergrave, daughter of the 2nd Earl Waldegrave and stepdaughter of Prince William Henry, Duke of Gloucester and Edinburgh. In 1829, she married The Hon. Henry Joseph St. John, son of George St John, 3rd Viscount Bolingbroke. He died in 1857. She was a grace and favour resident of Hampton Court Palace, living in Suite XXI from 1839 until her death on 27 August 1875.

One colourful reviewer lambasting contemporary novels in general singled her novel Mrs. Cleveland out as a "deleterious fungus" in which "Everything is improbable. The characters are...colourless, insipid, and vague...the language is such as would disgrace a daily governess at Whitechapel, in her feeblest efforts at English composition".

Her heavily annotated copy of Jane Austen's Mansfield Park is discussed in The Lost Books of Jane Austen (2019) by Janine Barchas.

== Bibliography ==
- Wedded Life In the Upper Ranks. The Wife and Friends, and the Married Man. 2 vol. 1831
- Geraldine Hamilton; Or, Self-Guidance. A Tale. 2 vol. 1832
- Mrs. Cleveland, and the St. Clairs: A Novel. 3 vol. London: Bentley, 1836.
- Augustus Courtenay, and Other Tales. 2 vol. London: Shoberl, 1852.
