= Sir Henry Oglander, 7th Baronet =

A watercolour executed by Oglander's wife before their marriage

Arms of Oglander: Azure, a stork between three cross-croslets fitchée or

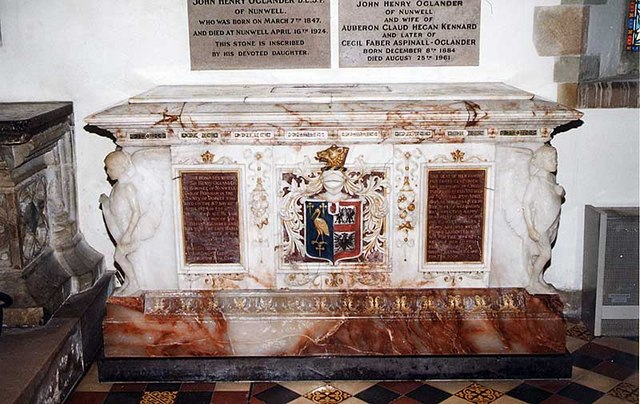
Chest tomb of Sir Henry Oglander, 7th Baronet, St Mary's Church, Brading

Sir Henry Oglander, 7th Baronet (1811–1874) was the son of Sir William Oglander, 6th Baronet and Maria Anne Fitzroy. He inherited the baronetcy on the death of his father in 1852.

In 1845 Oglander married Louisa Leeds, a daughter of Sir George Leeds, 1st Baronet.

In 1854, he was appointed High Sheriff of Dorset. He owned Nunwell House on the Isle of Wight, on the terrace of which stands an old gun, presented to him by the inhabitants.

During the invasion scare of 1859–60 he raised the 4th (Nunwell) Isle of Wight Rifle Volunteer Corps and commanded it with the rank of lieutenant, dated 17 July 1860, shortly afterwards being promoted to captain.

He died in 1874, the last of the family. He was buried in St. Mary's Church, Brading (alongside many of his ancestors) and has an arts and crafts style tomb. The west doorway of the Church of St. John the Evangelist, Sandown was built in the Norman style as a memorial to him. His wife, Louisa, died in 1894.

== Notes ==
Baronetage of England
Preceded by William Oglander	Baronet (of Nunwell); 1852–1874	Extinct
