= Nunwell =

Country estate on the Isle of Wight, England

Coordinates: 50°41′00″N 1°09′30″W

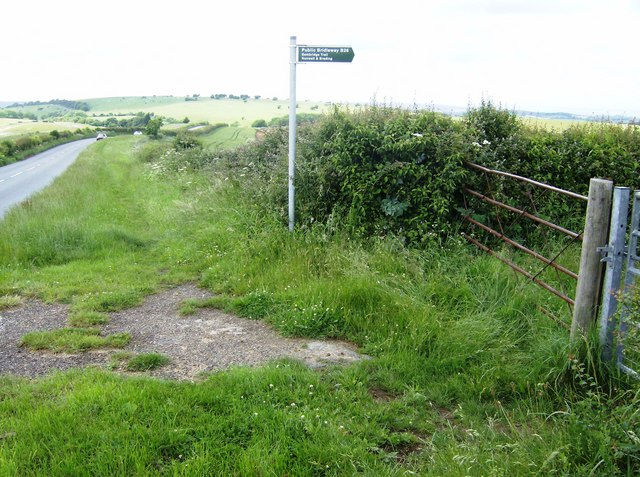
A bridleway in Nunwell

Nunwell is the location of Nunwell House, near Brading on the Isle of Wight, which was the home of the Oglander from the start of Henry I's reign until 1874. It is in the civil parish of Brading. The present family are not direct descendants through the male line and thus the baronetcy has died out.

== Name ==
The name possibly means 'the spring or stream of a man called Nunna', from Old English Nunna (personal name) and wella. It could also mean 'the spring or stream of the nuns', from Old English nunne and wella. Wella is referring to a stream called Nunnebroc (Nunna's brook, 13th century)

1086 (Domesday Book): Nonoelle

~1150: Nunewell

1193-1217: Nonnawelle

~1226: Nunnewelle

1541: Nunwell

== Geography ==
The Nunwell house is surrounded by five gardens and also a lily pond. The house also has a ballroom built in 1906, and a dining room from 1896.

== History ==
The Oglander family ruled Nunwell between 1193 and 1204. In 1552 it was purchased by Oliver Oglander.

The Nunwell Estate was owned by Tostig Godwinsson prior to the Norman Conquest. The present house is largely Jacobean and was sold off briefly, with the Oglander family moving into the former coach house.

The medieval Brading Town Gunne is at the coach house after being stolen in the 1950s and rediscovered in a saleroom and returned not to the town gunne room but to Nunwell by an anonymous well-wisher. The Town Trust are negotiating for its return. It is cracked due to its having been overcharged to celebrate the 1832 Reform Act.

=== King Charles I ===
The building is known for being King Charles I's first voyage, after he escaped London. However, he was taken on November 18, 1647, and he was then executed. at Whitehall.
