= Nunwell House =

Coordinates: 50.684°N 1.146°W

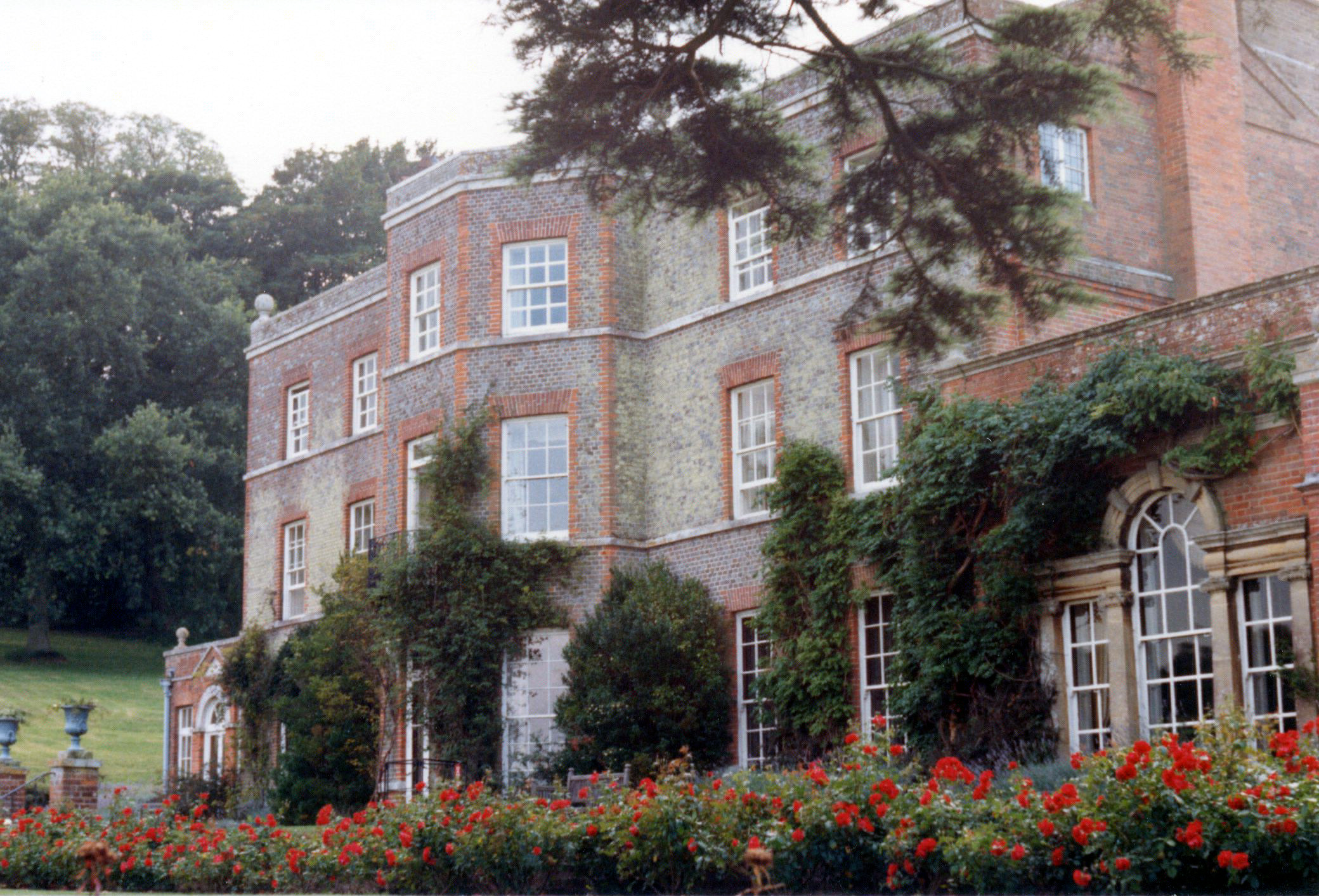
- Interactive map of the Nunwell House area

General information
- Type: English country house
- Location: England

Nunwell House, also Nunwell Manor (also Nonoelle, 11th century; Nunewille, 12th century; Nunnewelle, 13th century), is a historic English country house in Brading, Isle of Wight. Located 3 miles (4.8 km) south of Ryde, the Tudor and Jacobean style house also has later additions. The house contains family militaria. It was occupied by the Oglander family from Norman times. Nunwell House is a Grade II* listed building.

Nunwell House is situated to the northwest of Brading. Views of Brading harbour and St. Helens Road are visible from the house.

== History ==
Nunwell was one of Earl Tostig's manors before the Conquest, held in 1086 by the king. In 1199 Stephen son of Odo conveyed 20 acres of land in Nunwell to Ralph son of Nigel, and in 1286 John de Tracy and his wife Benedicta exchanged land in Nunwell for land in Holton with William de Houton. The statement of Sir Richard Worsley that the Oglander family had been seated at Nunwell ever since the Conquest is difficult to substantiate, but Roger Oglander was possibly holding the manor at the beginning of the 13th century when land at Nunwell was given by his servant Geoffrey Escoutard to Carisbrooke Priory, and his grandson Roger recovered 2 acres in Nunwell from Gilbert Abbot of Lire in 1256. It is not, however, till the end of the century that we are on firm ground; Henry Oglander then held Nunwell of the honour of Carisbrooke Castle. He died about 1310, and his son and successor Robert died in 1344, leaving as his heir his son Reginald, who had married Roberta the daughter of Robert Urry. Reginald held in 1346 with his coparceners three parts of a fee in Nunwell, representing what in later years came to be termed West Nunwell. He died in 1349, leaving a son Robert, and livery of the manor was made to his widow Roberta in that year. Robert died without issue and his brother John succeeded to the manor. Reginald Oglander, who held the manor in 1428, is given as John's brother in a pedigree printed by Berry, but the pedigree is clearly wrong at this date.

Alice Oglander was in possession in 1431. John Oglander, whose relationship to Reginald is not known, died seised of the manor in 1483, leaving a son Thomas, whose grandson George died in 1567 holding the manor, which was then known as West Nunwell. His son and successor, Sir William Oglander died in 1609, and his son Sir John Oglander writes of the manor-house of West Nunwell that it was 'now altogether dilapidated, but before it was consumed by fire in Henry VI's time was a goodly house and a great village of fifty houses belonging to it.' Sir John, a well-known Royalist deputy governor of Portsmouth and deputy-lieutenant of the Isle of Wight 1595–1648, hosted Charles I at Nunwell on the King's last night of freedom. When he died in 1655, he left a series of valuable local notes, now preserved at Nunwell. He was succeeded by his son William, created a baronet by Charles II in 1665. The manor descended with the title in the direct line until the death of the seventh baronet Sir Henry in 1874 without issue. He left the estate to his cousin John Henry Glynn, who, in compliance with Sir Henry's will, took the name of Oglander by royal licence in 1895, and was the possessor of Nunwell as of 1912.

== Grounds ==
It is situated on a rising ground at the end of a large lawn and is backed by a grove of ashes and limes. There is a 5.5 acres (2.2 ha) garden with a lily pond.
