= St Mary's Church, Brading =

Coordinates: 50°40′57″N 01°08′34″W

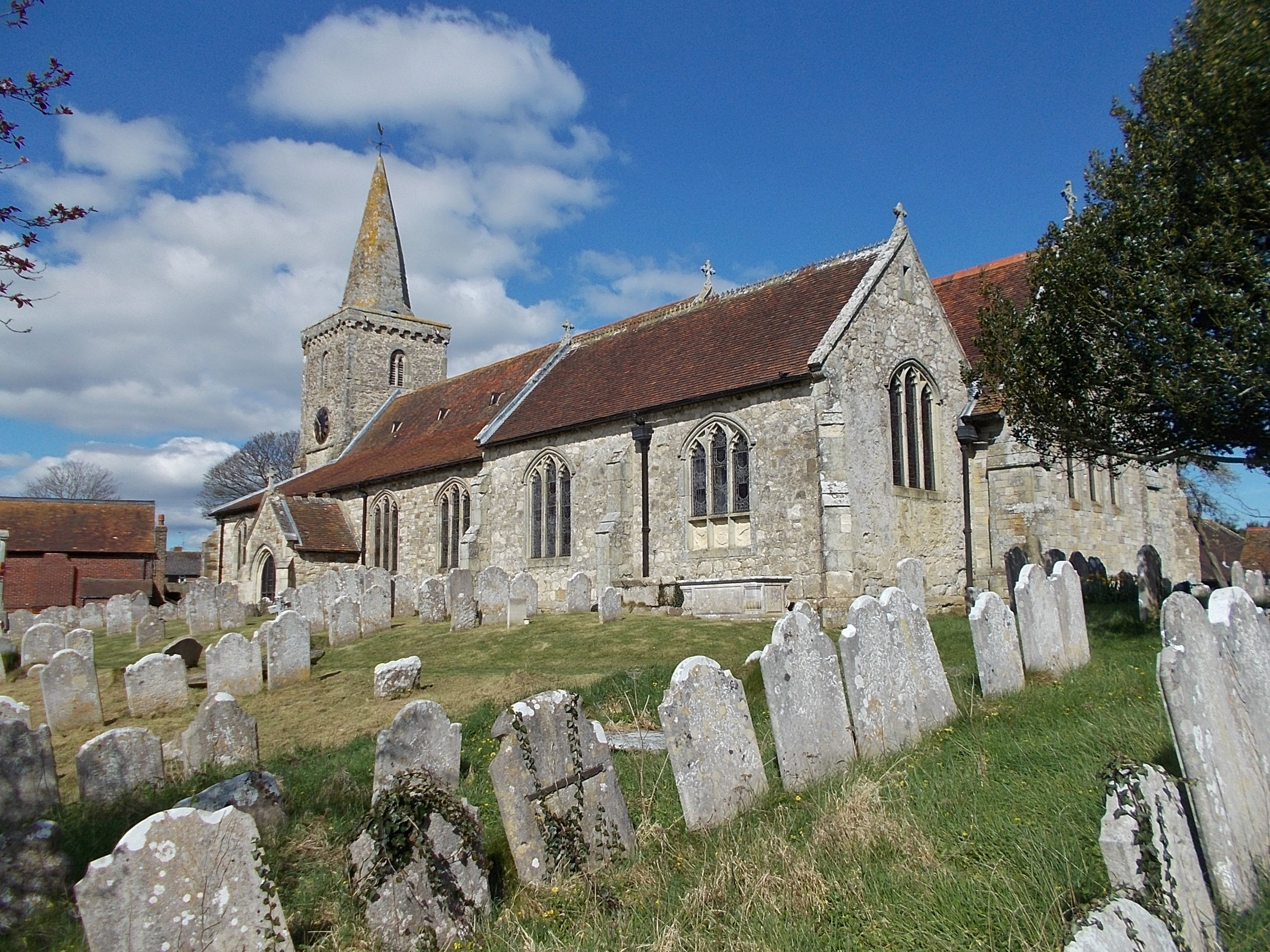
- St Mary's Church, Brading
- Denomination: Church of England
- Churchmanship: Broad Church

History
- Dedication: St Mary

Administration
- Province: Canterbury
- Diocese: Portsmouth
- Archdeaconry: Isle of Wight
- Deanery: Isle of Wight
- Parish: Brading

St Mary's Church is a parish church in the Church of England located in Brading, Isle of Wight.

== History ==
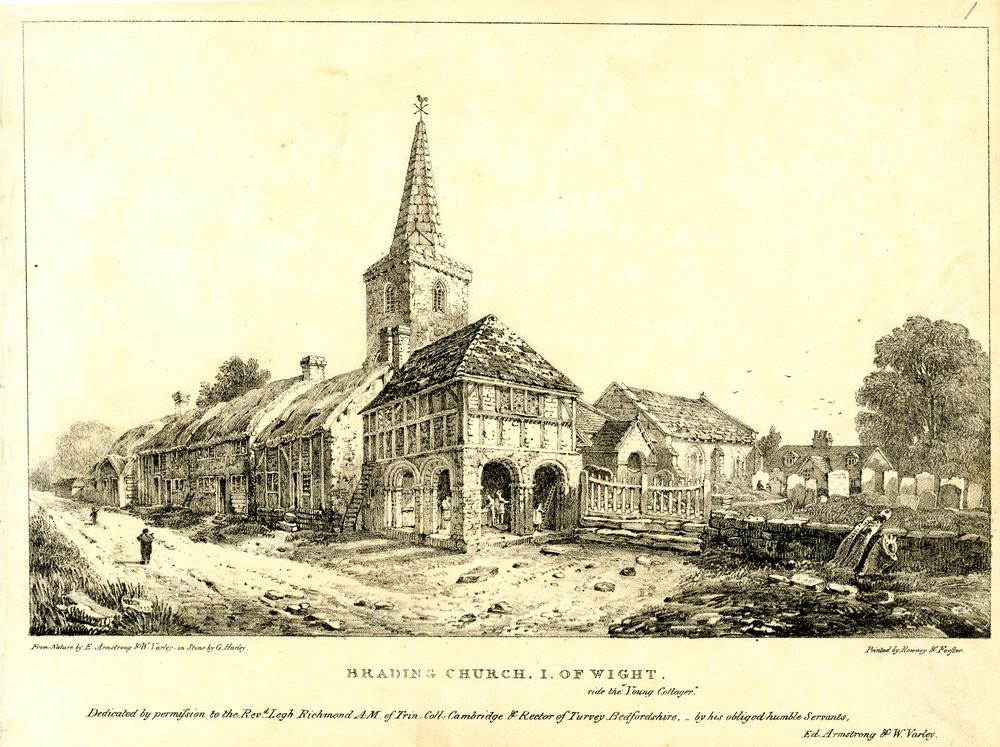
Brading Church, in an 1820s lithograph

The church is medieval dating from the twelfth century. At this church the Rev. Legh Richmond is thought to have originated the now globally popular idea of using boards with movable numbers to indicate hymn numbers during church services. The 13th-century tower is of a very unusual style in that it is built on four piers at the entrance to the church. This is one of only four in examples in Britain. The tower contains a ring of 8 bells which the heaviest weighs 10.5cwt in the key of G. The oldest bell was made in 1594. The current church building has aspects dating from the late 12th century onward, with the majority of the present building resulting from the alterations of the 14th and 15th centuries. The Oglander Chapel on the eastern end of the south aisle is the resting place of members of that family and includes two elaborately carved and painted wooden effigies of knights placed upon two of the tombs. Whilst installed by the family itself, their appearance does not represent the accurate historical dress of the time for the family members in the tombs beneath. In the north aisle there are funerary hatchments of the Oglander family on the walls, and two fonts from the 13th and 15th centuries.

The churchyard contains the Commonwealth war graves of four British Army soldiers of World War I.

=== List of incumbents ===
- Legh Richmond 1798–1805

== Parish Status ==
The church is within a group which includes:

- St John the Baptist Church, Yaverland
- St Mary's Church, Brading

== Organ ==
The church has a pipe organ by Forster and Andrews dating from 1864. A specification of the organ can be found on the National Pipe Organ Register.
