= John Oglander =

English politician

Sir John Oglander, after an unknown artist

Sir John Oglander (12 May 1585 – 28 November 1655) was an English politician who sat in the House of Commons from 1625 to 1629. He is now remembered as a diarist.

== Life ==
Oglander was born at Nunwell House on the Isle of Wight, the son of William Oglander of West Dean, Sussex. He matriculated at Balliol College, Oxford on 8 July 1603, aged 18 and was a student of Middle Temple in 1604. He was knighted on 22 December 1615. In 1620, he was appointed deputy-governor of Portsmouth by William Herbert, 3rd Earl of Pembroke. He resigned in 1624 when he was made Deputy Governor of the Isle of Wight. He also commanded a company of the Isle of Wight Trained Bands in 1625, and a 'division' of the trained bands in 1628.

In 1625, Oglander was elected member of parliament for Yarmouth (Isle of Wight). He was re-elected MP for Yarmouth in 1626 and 1628 and sat until 1629 when Charles I decided to rule without parliament for eleven years. During the king's personal rule Oglander was a firm royalist. He became High Sheriff of Hampshire in 1637, and was an energetic collector of ship money.

Sir John Oglander lost his deputy-governor position, and was twice arrested by the parliamentarians during the First English Civil War, but was treated leniently in the end, in 1645. He took a concerned interest in the king's safety in 1647 and 1648 when Charles was in Carisbrooke Castle. Warned, however, of informers among the courtiers by Robert Hammond, he backed off. In 1650 he was visited by Henry Stuart, Duke of Gloucester and Princess Elizabeth; was arrested again in early 1651; and was again released on surety.

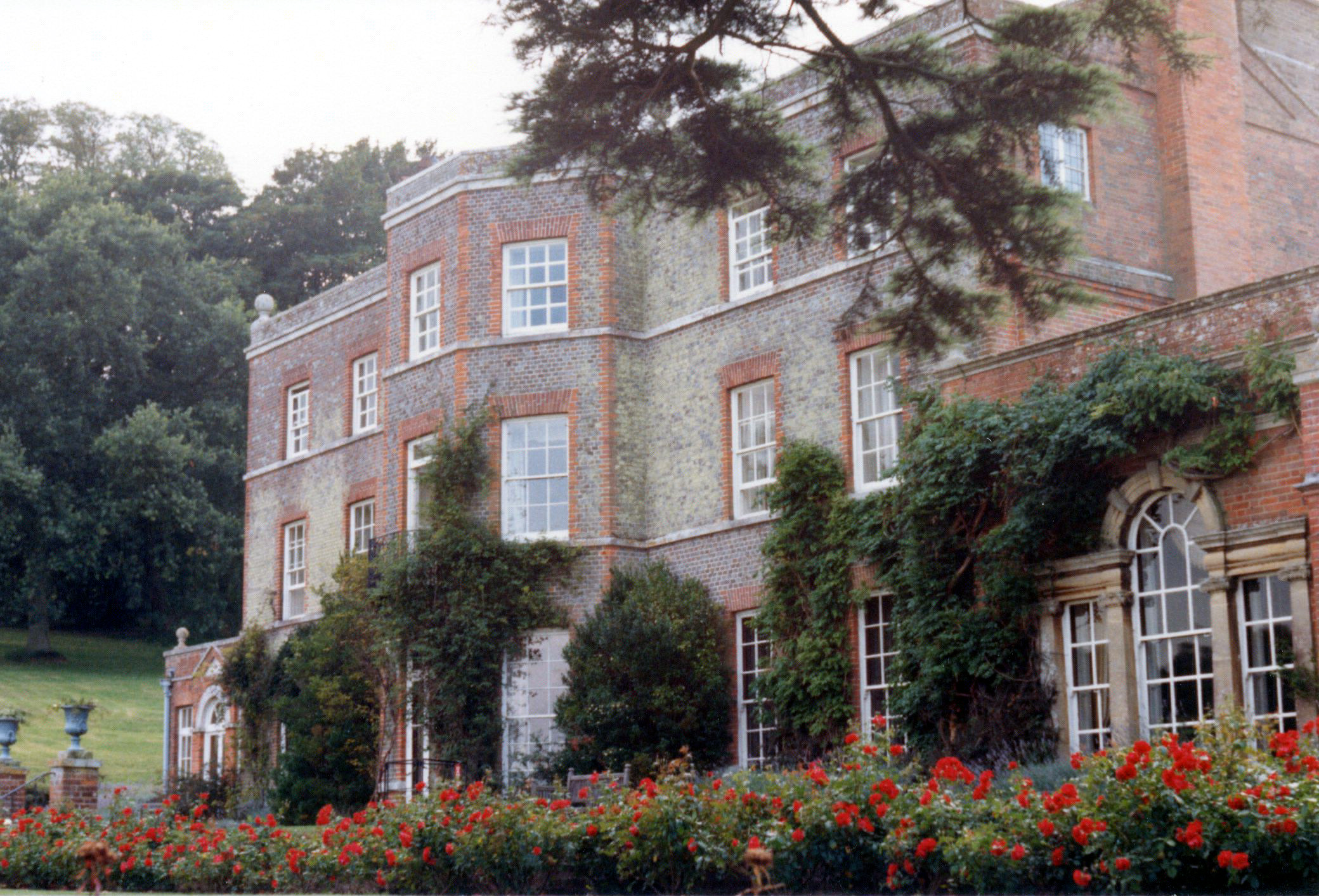
Nunwell house, home of Sir John Oglander, 1988

Oglander married Frances More, daughter of Sir George More of Loseley Park in Surrey. He had four sons including William who was created baronet and three daughters. Oglander died at the age of 70.

== Diarist ==
Sir John kept detailed accounts of his household and estate, which survive today. They are of particular interest because they evolved into a personal diary. These records were used superficially by Sir Richard Worsley, 7th Baronet in his History of the Isle of Wight (1781). An edition was published by William Henry Long in 1888, as The Oglander Memoirs.

At times of great personal emotion, some entries were written in his own blood. In April 2013, Sir John was one of five contrasting subjects featured in the first episode of the BBC Four series, The Century that Wrote Itself, presented by Adam Nicolson.

Parliament of England
Preceded by Thomas Risley; William Beeston	Member of Parliament for Yarmouth (Isle of Wight); 1625–1629; With: John Suckling 1625–1626; Sir Edward Conway 1626; Edward Dennis 1628–1629	Parliament suspended until 1640
