= Sir William Oglander, 1st Baronet =

English politician

Arms of Oglander: Azure, a stork between three cross-croslets fitchée or

Sir William Oglander, 1st Baronet (c. 1611 – 1670) was an English politician who sat in the House of Commons of England from 1660 to 1670. He supported the Royalist side in the English Civil War.

Oglander was the son of Sir John Oglander and his wife Frances More daughter of Sir George More of Loseley Park, Surrey. His father was deputy governor of Portsmouth and then of the Isle of Wight.

In April 1640, Oglander was chosen Member of Parliament for Yarmouth (Isle of Wight) in the Short Parliament, a seat previously held by his father prior to the personal rule of Charles I. However, he offended the corporation and never sat. The Oglander family were loyal to King Charles and suffered during the English Civil War.

After the Restoration In 1660 Oglander was elected MP for Newport (Isle of Wight) and held the seat until his death in 1670. He was made deputy-governor of the Isle of Wight in 1664 and was created baronet of Nunwell in the County of Southampton in the Baronetage of England on 12 December 1665

Oglander married Dorothy Clerke, daughter of Sir Francis Clerke. His son John inherited the baronetcy.

Parliament of England
| Parliament suspended since 1629 | Member of Parliament for Yarmouth (Isle of Wight); 1640; With: John Bulkeley | Succeeded by Viscount L'Isle; Sir John Leigh |
| Preceded by William Stevens; Sir Henry Worsley, Bt | Member of Parliament for Newport (Isle of Wight); 1660–1670; With: Sir Robert Dillington, Bt; William Glascock | Succeeded by William Glascock; Sir Robert Dillington, Bt |
Baronetage of England
| New creation | Baronet (of Nunwell); 1665–1874 | Succeeded by John Oglander |
