= Oglander baronets =

Extinct baronetcy in the Baronetage of England

Arms of Oglander: Azure, a stork between three cross-croslets fitchée or

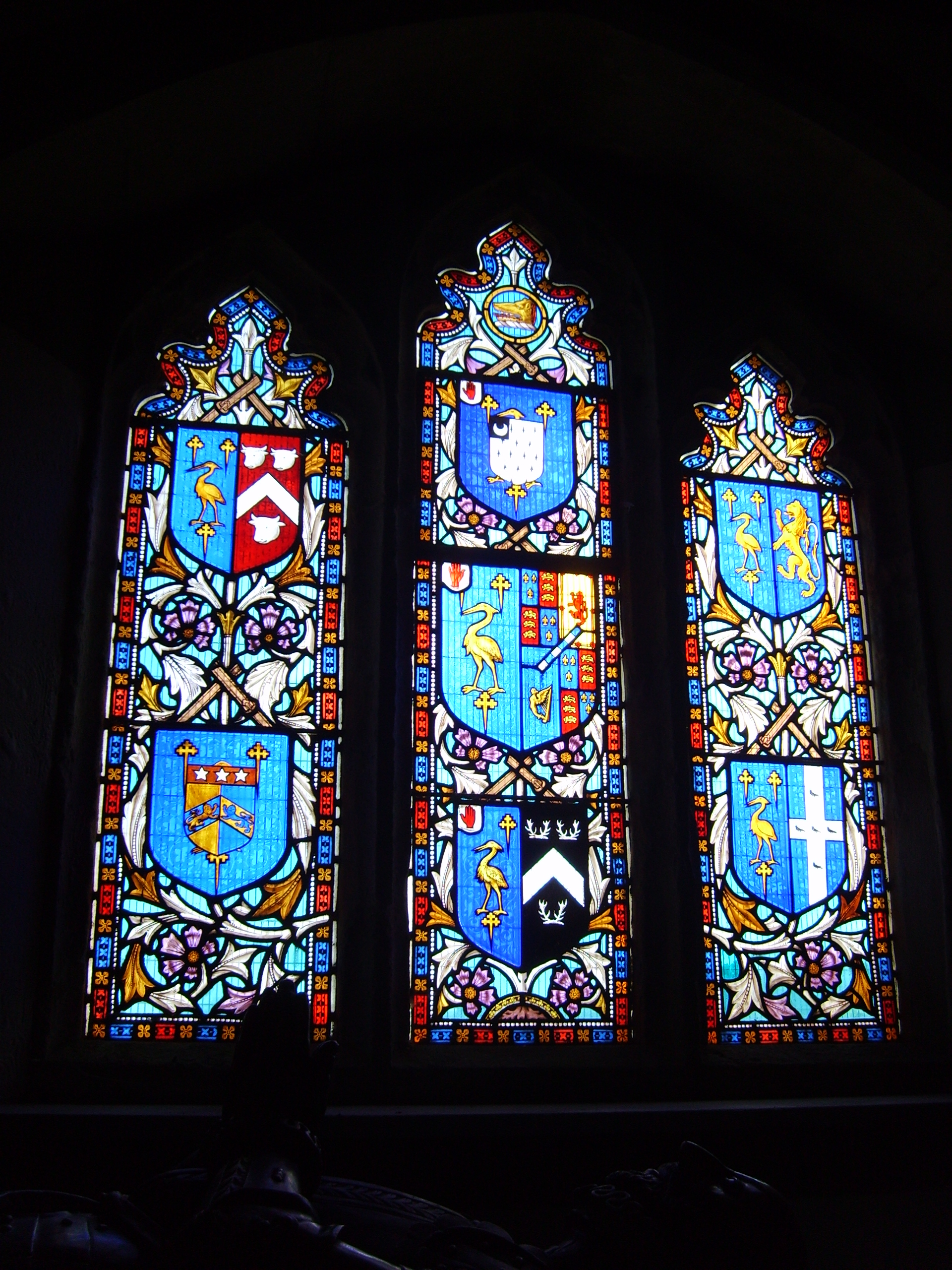
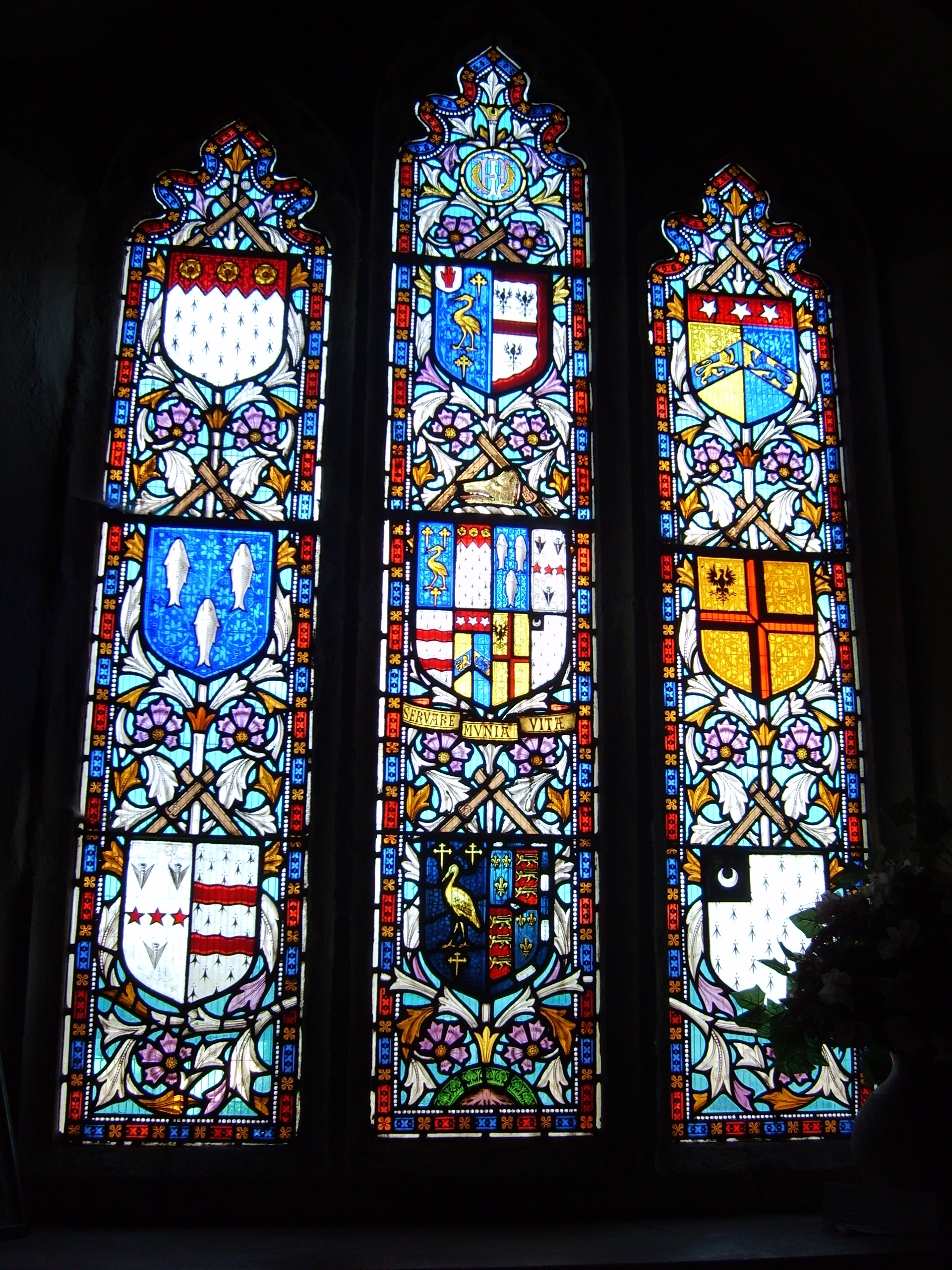
Heraldic memorial windows of the Oglander family of Nunwell in St. Mary the Virgin's Church, Brading, Isle of Wight.

The Oglander Baronetcy, of Nunwell in the County of Southampton, was a title in the Baronetage of England. It was created on 12 December 1665 for William Oglander, Member of Parliament for Yarmouth and Newport. The sixth Baronet was member of parliament for Bodmin. The title became extinct on the death of the seventh Baronet, Sir Henry Oglander, in 1874. He left the Nunwell estate to his cousin John Henry Glynn, who, in compliance with Sir Henry's will, took the name of Oglander by royal licence in 1895, and was the possessor of Nunwell as of 1912.

The family seat was Nunwell House, Nunwell, Isle of Wight.

== Oglander baronets, of Nunwell (1665) ==
- Sir William Oglander, 1st Baronet (c. 1611–1670)
- Sir John Oglander, 2nd Baronet (c. 1642–c. 1683)
- Sir William Oglander, 3rd Baronet (c. 1680–1734)
- Sir John Oglander, 4th Baronet (c. 1704–1767)
- Sir William Oglander, 5th Baronet (1733–1806)
- Sir William Oglander, 6th Baronet (1769–1852)
- Sir Henry Oglander, 7th Baronet (1811–1874)
