= Charles Wilkin =

English artist

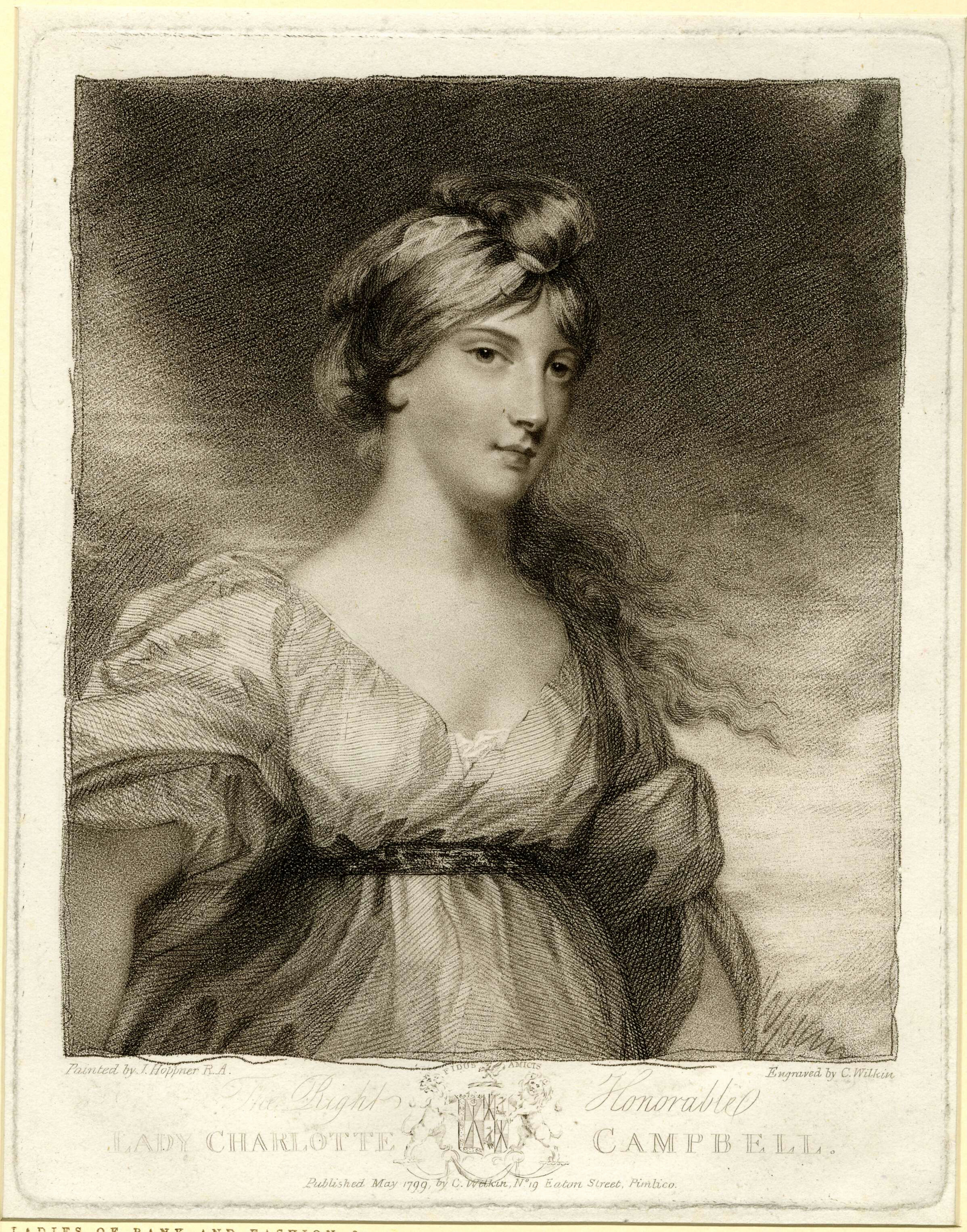
Portraits of Ladies of Rank and Fashion Lady Charlotte Bury (1799) after John Hoppner

Charles Wilkin (c. 1750 – 28 May 1814, in London), was an English engraver, painter and publisher who exhibited at the Royal Academy between 1783 and 1808, and is best known for his stipple engravings.

Some of his more famous works were "Lady Cockburn and her Children" (1792) after Joshua Reynolds and "Mrs Parkyns" (1795) after John Hoppner.

Wilkin also published ten stipple-engraved prints depicting "Portraits of Ladies of Rank and Fashion" (1797–1803), "executed in a manner to unite the Higher Finishing of Painting with the Spirit and Freedom of Drawing" – three were his own and seven were after John Hoppner, though Wilkin was vexed over "the Difficulty that attends getting Mr Hoppner’s Pictures". Technically, Wilkin's engravings "are among the best examples of stipple, the admixture of etched lines and a vigorous use of the roulette preserving a thoroughly draughtsmanlike style."

Wilkin managed to stipple-engrave with a quite distinctive style, which was not an easy achievement, since this form of engraving does not lend itself to individual expression.

Francis William Wilkin (1800–1842) and Henry Wilkin (1801–1852), his sons, also exhibited their paintings at the Royal Academy.

== Sources ==
- Hind, Arthur Mayger (1912). Bartolozzi and other stipple engravers working in England at the end of the eighteenth century.
