= Sir William Oglander, 6th Baronet =

English politician

- Born: 13 September 1769; Parnham, near Bridport, Dorset, England
- Died: 17 January 1852 (aged 82); Parnham, Dorset, England
- Occupation: Politician

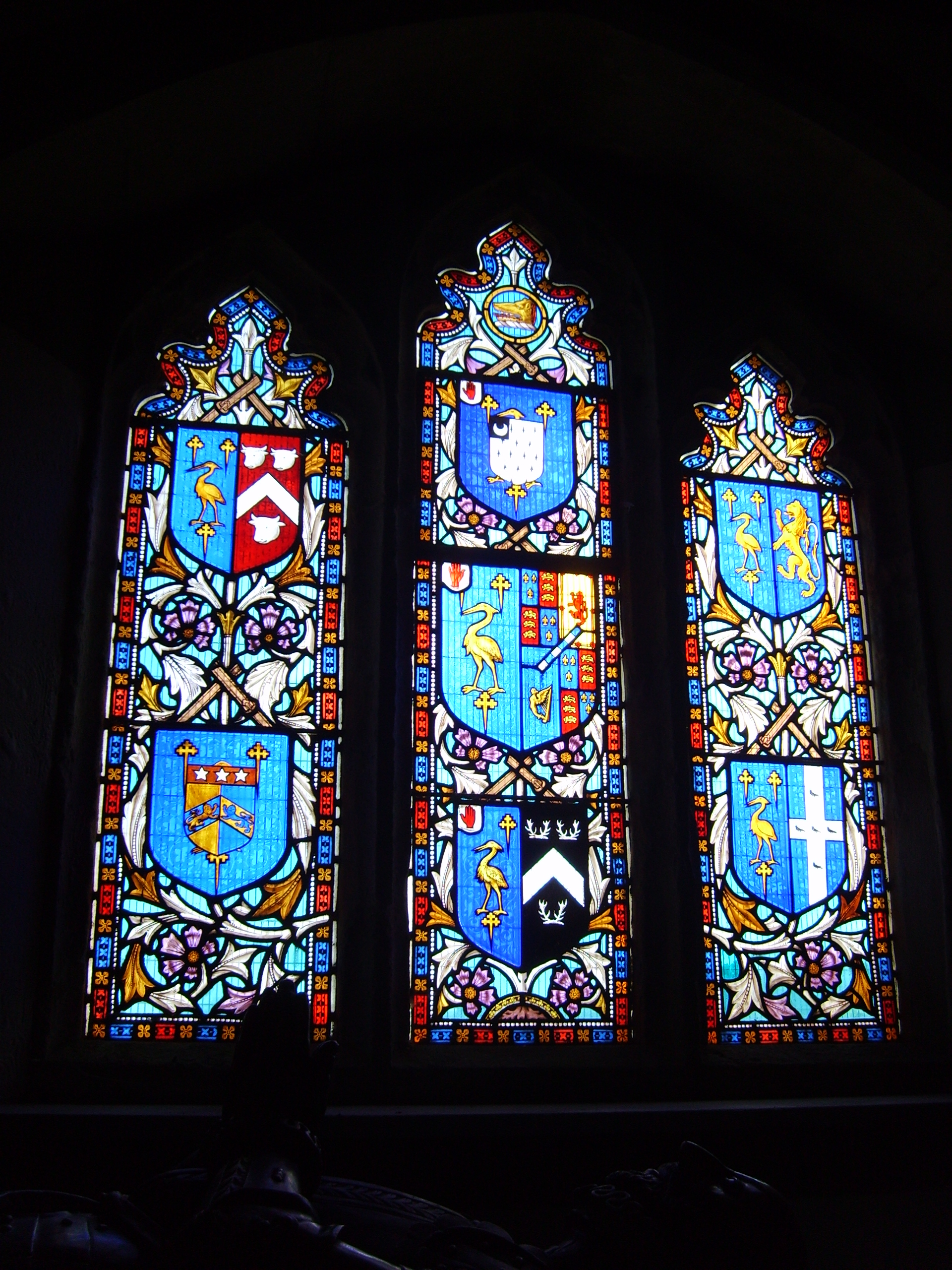
Oglander heraldic window in St. Mary the Virgin's Church, Brading; the centre shield shows the arms of Sir William Oglander, 6th Baronet impaling Fitzroy.

Sir William Oglander, 6th Baronet (13 September 1769 – 17 January 1852) of Nunwell, Brading, Isle of Wight, was an English politician who sat in the House of Commons from 1807 to 1812.

== Life ==
Maria, wife of Sir William Oglander by Sir Thomas Lawrence

William Oglander was born at Parnham, near Bridport, Dorset, the son of Sir William Oglander, 5th Baronet and his wife Sukey Serle, daughter of Peter Serle of Testwood. He was educated at Winchester College and matriculated at New College, Oxford, on 3 March 1787 aged 17 and was awarded a BA in 1790. He succeeded to the baronetcy on the death of his father on 5 January 1806.

In 1807 he was elected member of parliament for Bodmin and sat until 1812. He was High Sheriff of Dorset from 1817 to 1818.

He married Maria Anne Fitzroy, daughter of George FitzRoy, 4th Duke of Grafton at St George's, Hanover Square on 24 May 1810 and around 1820 he commissioned a portrait of her by Sir Thomas Lawrence, probably intended to hang in the newly renovated home at Parnham.

Oglander died at the age of 82 at Parnham. He was succeeded in the baronetcy by his son Henry.

Parliament of the United Kingdom
Preceded by William Wingfield; Davies Giddy	Member of Parliament for Bodmin; 1807–1812; With: Davies Giddy	Succeeded by Charles Bathurst; Davies Giddy
Baronetage of England
Preceded by William Oglander	Baronet (of Nunwell); 1806–1852	Succeeded by Henry Oglander
