= St Helens railway station (Isle of Wight) =

Former railway station in Isle of Wight, UK

Coordinates: 50°41′37″N 1°06′44″W

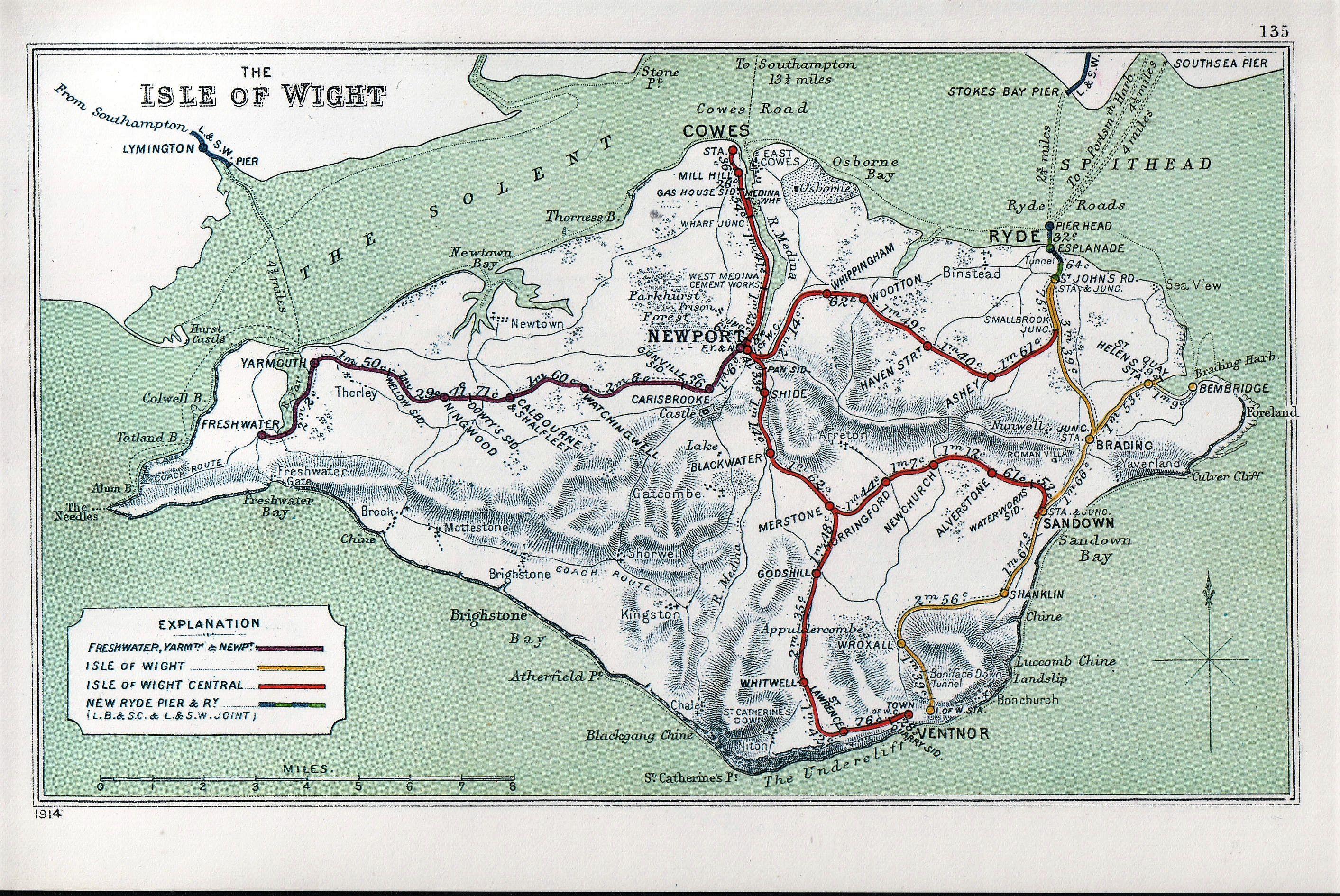
A 1914 Railway Clearing House map of lines around The Isle of Wight.

St Helens with its 232-foot-long (71 m) single platform was the only intermediate stop on the 2 3/4-mile (4.4 km) branch line that connected Brading to the coast at Bembridge.

== History ==
Opened in 1882, when the area was the Island's main port, it ran with ever-dwindling passengers until 1953. Pomeroy described the station thus:

An imposing structure with tall chimneys and elegant dormers, particularly pleasing to the eye.

. After closure the station building was converted to a private house.

== Train Ferry ==
From 1885 to 1888 St Helens was the Isle of Wight end of a Freight only Train ferry Service. This connected the Isle of Wight Rail Network with Mainland Great Britain's network at Langston railway station, using the Former Firth of Tay Train Ferry TF Carrier.

== Stationmasters ==
In 1931 the stationmaster, Thomas George Clayton Weeks was sentenced to 18 months’ imprisonment for theft and forgery of receipts. He had created fictitious wage sheets for casual workers at the Southern Railway quay and robbed the company of around £3,000 (equivalent to £176,700 in 2025) in four years. It was reported that he had been spending about £5 (equivalent to £300 in 2025) per week on drink, and made presents of joints of beef to various villagers, spending over £400 (equivalent to £23,600 in 2025) at one butchers shop in twelve months.

- William Weeks from 1882 (formerly station master at Wroxall)
- George Wetherick ca. 1897 ca. 1910
- Thomas George Weeks until 1931
- Charles Willcocks ca. 1935

Preceding station	Disused railways	Following station
Brading	British Railways; Southern Region; Isle of Wight Railway (Brading Harbour Improvement and Railway Company) : Brading to Bembridge line	Bembridge

== See also ==
- List of closed railway stations in Britain
