= Isle of Wight Railway Company =

The Isle of Wight Railway Company can refer to two bodies:

- The historical company which built and operated the Isle of Wight Railway network from 1864 to 1923.
- The modern company which formed from the Wight Locomotive Society, which re-built, operates and maintains the Isle of Wight Steam Railway.
