= TF Carrier =

Train ferry

History

- Name: TF Carrier
- Owner: North British Railway; Isle of Wight Railway
- Route: Tayport-Broughty Ferry; Granton-Burntisland; Langston-Bembridge
- Builder: Scott & Co, Greenock
- Launched: 16 November 1858
- In service: 1858
- Out of service: 1888
- Fate: Scrapped 1888

General characteristics
- Class & type: Train ferry
- Tonnage: 243 GRT
- Length: 124 ft (38 m)
- Beam: 26 ft 9 in (8.15 m) between paddles
- Propulsion: 2 112HP oscillating cylinder steam engines

TF Carrier was a train ferry introduced by the Edinburgh & Northern Railway, later incorporated into the North British Railway, to cross the River Tay as part of its route between Edinburgh and Aberdeen.

== History ==
=== Scotland ===
Launched in 1858, the Carrier was the third and smallest vessel in a fleet of six train ferries introduced by Thomas Bouch, the engineer of the Edinburgh & Northern Railway, to carry the company's trains across the Forth and Tay estuaries. Bouch was not only responsible for their design but also that of the linkspans and associated equipment. The ferries carried goods wagons and, occasionally, empty passenger coaches. The passengers themselves crossed by conventional paddle steamers.

Built by Scott & Co of Greenock, Carrier was a 243 GRT paddle steamer, 124 feet (38 m) long and 26 feet 9 inches (8.15 m) wide between the paddles. She was powered by two oscillating cylinder steam engines, each developing 112 horsepower (84 kW). She had two tracks on her deck each capable of handling seven wagons.

Initially allocated to the Tay crossing she was transferred to the Forth crossing along with her sister ship Robert Napier when Bouch's ill-fated Tay Bridge opened in June 1878. When that structure collapsed on 28 December 1879, Robert Napier returned to the Tay to re-establish the link but Carrier remained at Granton.

=== Isle of Wight ===
By 1883 Carrier was surplus to requirements at Granton and was sold to the Isle of Wight Railway Marine Transit Company which wished to establish a ferry service between Langstone station on the London, Brighton & South Coast Railway's Hayling Island branch and St Helens station on the Bembridge branch on the island. The service commenced in 1885. The following year the TF Carrier was hired to the London, Brighton & South Coast Railway due to the IoWMTC's financial state. However the Carrier was ill-suited to the exposed waters of The Solent and the service ceased in 1888 and the ship sold for scrap.
