= Brading railway station =

Railway station on the Isle of Wight, England

Brading
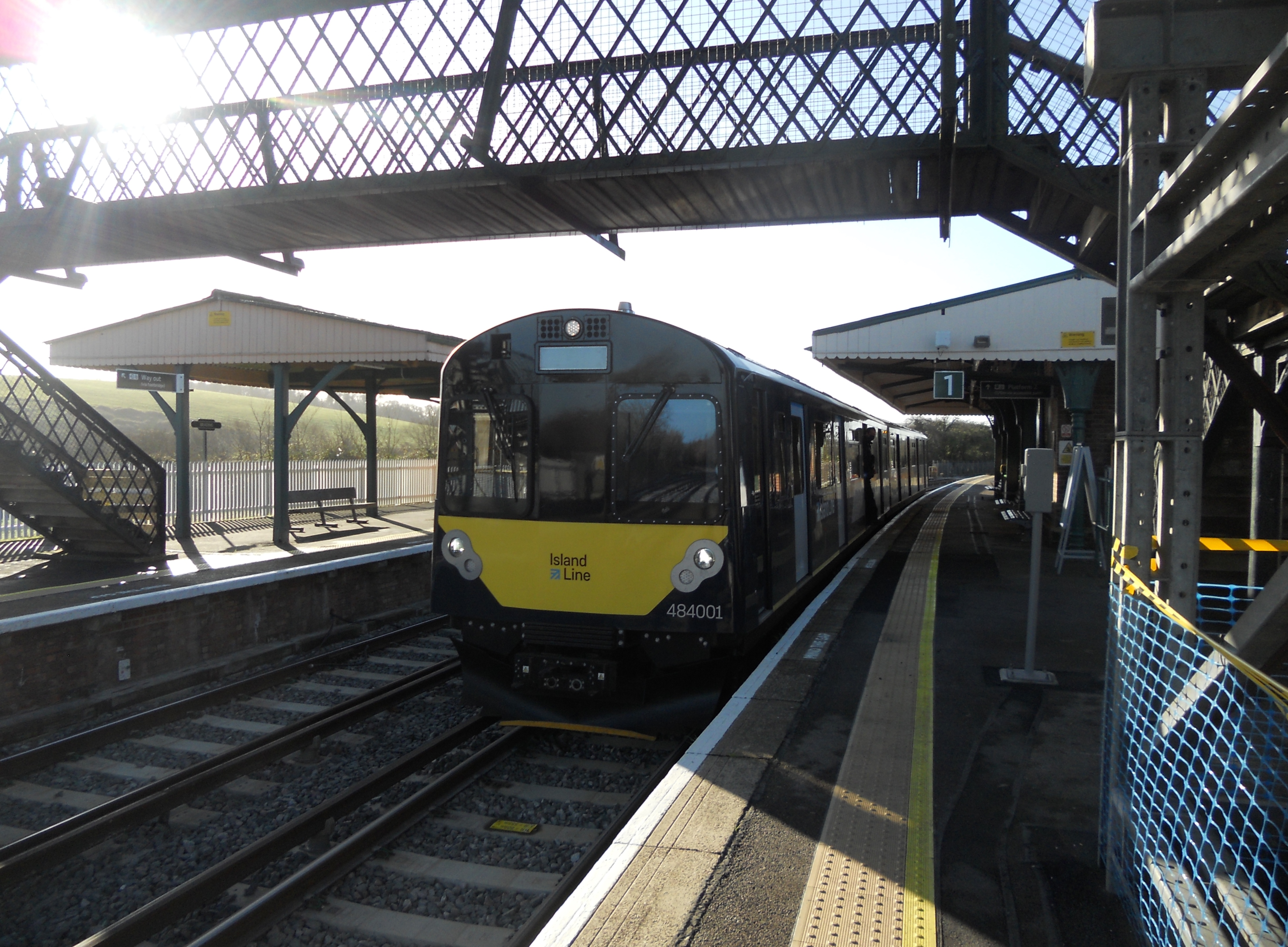
- Brading station seen with the restored passing loop and second platform

General information
- Location: Brading, Isle of Wight; England
- Coordinates: 50.678°N 1.139°W
- Grid reference: SZ609868
- Manager: Island Line
- Platforms: 2

Other information
- Station code: BDN
- Classification: DfT category F2

History
- Opened: 23 August 1864
- Original company: Isle of Wight Railway
- Post-grouping: Southern Railway

Key dates
- 1 January 1967: Closed for electrification
- 20 March 1967: Reopened
- 28 October 1988: Signal box & platform 2 closed, removal of passing loop
- 3 January 2021: Closed for upgrade works
- 1 November 2021: Reopened; passing loop reinstalled, recommissioning of platform 2

Passengers
- 2021/22: ▲10,410
- 2022/23: ▲16,378
- 2023/24: ▼16,122
- 2024/25: ▲17,080
- 2025/26: ▲21,798

Listed Building – Grade II
- Feature: Brading Railway Station Main Building
- Designated: 14 April 1986
- Reference no.: 1034363
Location
Notes
- Passenger statistics from the Office of Rail and Road

Brading railway station is a Grade II listed railway station serving Brading on the Isle of Wight, England. It is located on the Island Line from Ryde to Shanklin. Owing to its secluded countryside location, it is one of the quietest stations on the island.

== History ==
The station was opened in 1864 by the Isle of Wight Railway on their initial Ryde-Shanklin line. In 1882 it became a junction station, when the Brading-Bembridge branch line opened as part of the Brading Haven reclamation scheme. The branch line closed to passengers in 1953 and completely in 1957.

Under Southern Railway ownership, the passing loop was extended southwards from Brading to Sandown in 1927, forming a second section of double track on the Island Line.

Brading was one of the last stations on the British Rail network to retain gas lighting, with the fittings converted to mercury vapour usage in 1985. As of 2010 some of the fittings were still in use, now using compact fluorescent bulbs.

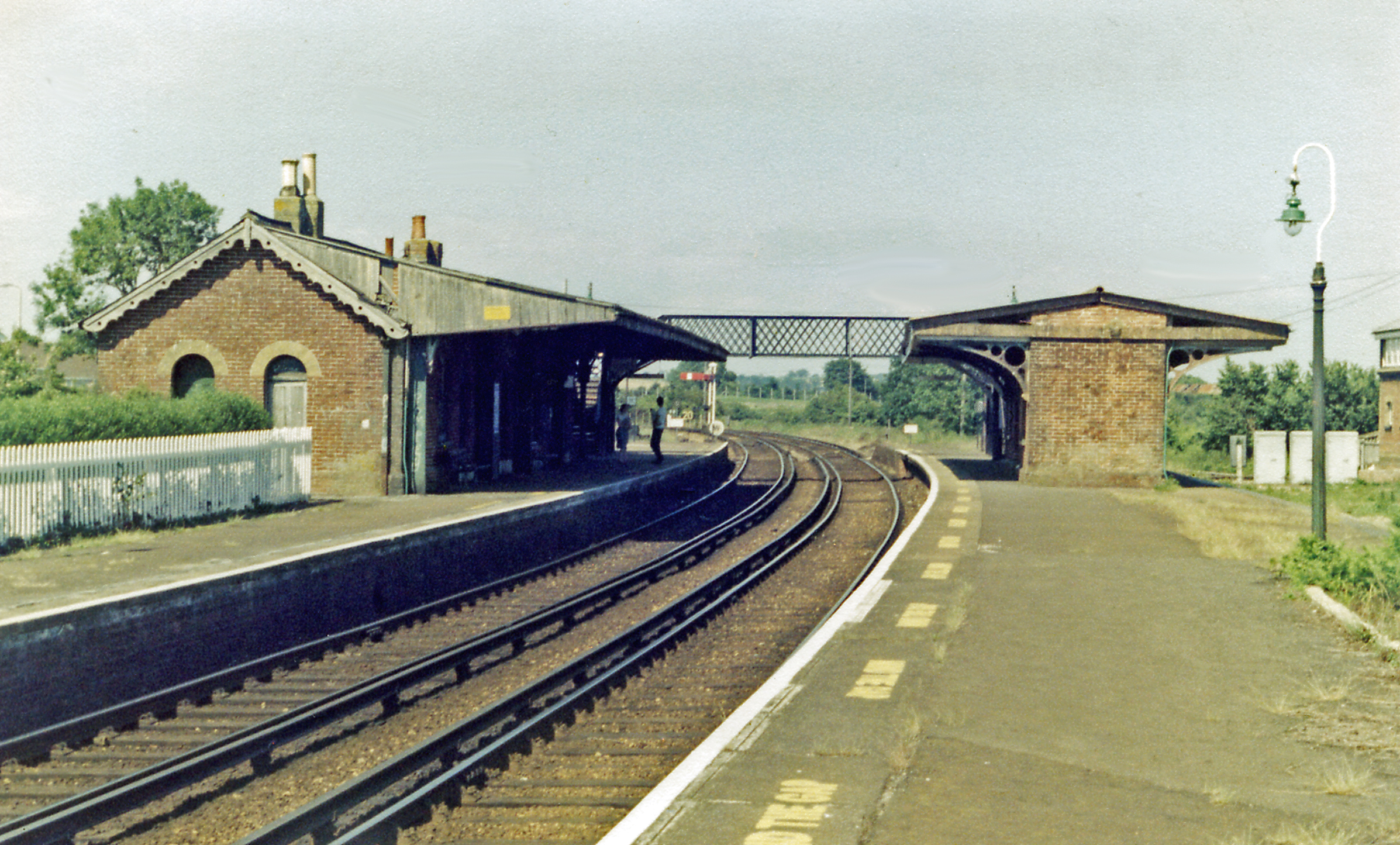
Brading station, 1985

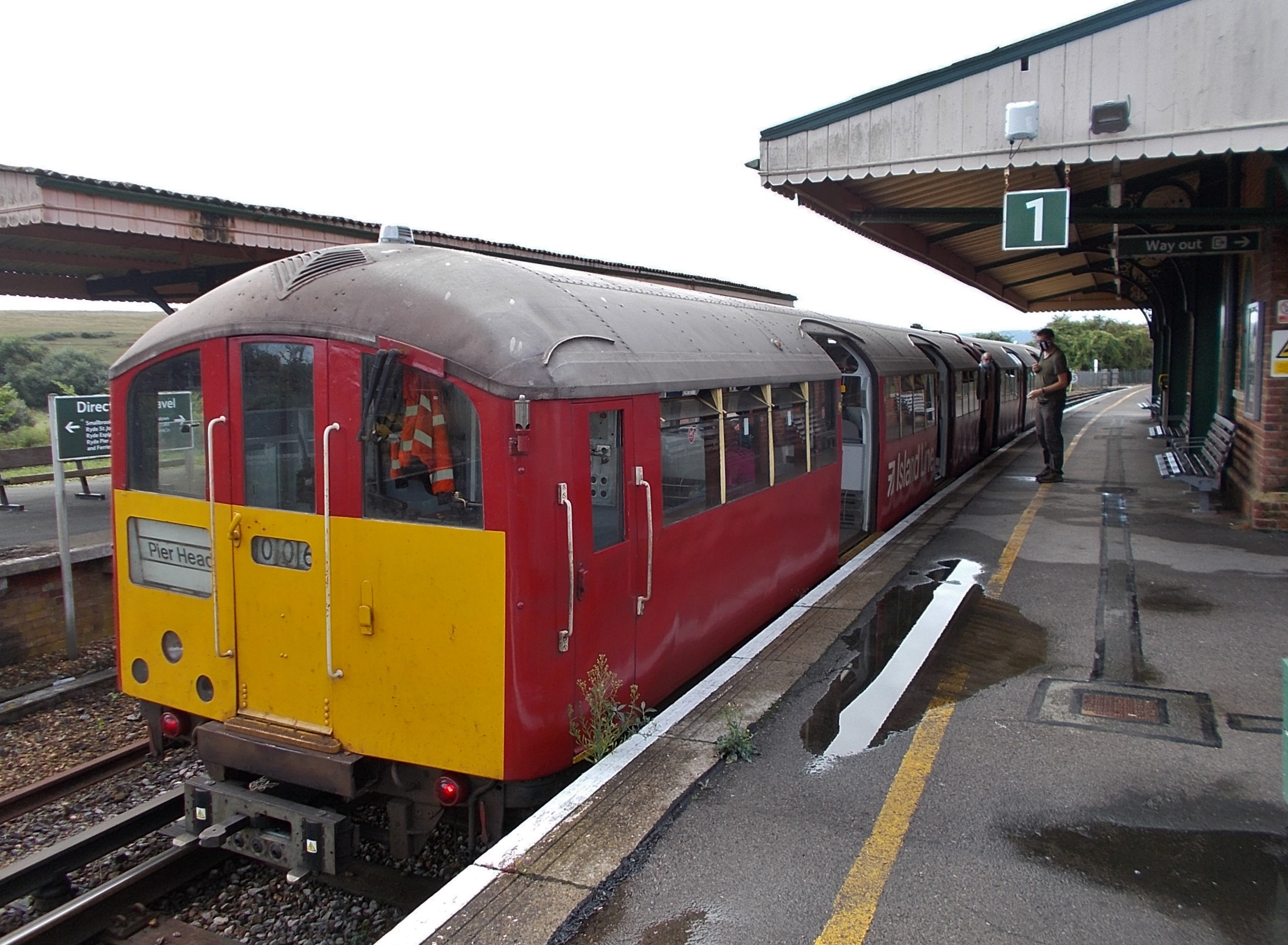
A Class 483 train at Brading in August 2020. Over 80 years old at the time, these units were retired in January 2021 and replaced with Class 484 units later that year.

Brading signalbox closed on 28 October 1988, and the passing loop at Brading station was removed, meaning that only one platform remained in use. This meant trains could no longer run at even 30-minute intervals on the line. By 1998 the signal box and branch platforms were very overgrown and the buildings were threatened with demolition. In August 2007 Brading Town Council announced a plan to revamp the exterior of the station buildings and former signal box, and have used grants and volunteers to gradually reopen different parts of the station, with the whole of the station and signal box fully opening to the public in March 2010 for the first time in 40 years. Both the signal box and main station building are Grade II listed, along with the station building on the east platform, the footbridge, and the station house.

The current footbridge was installed in the late 1990s, as part of Railtracks Station Regeneration Programme - the original bridge was no longer safe. The replacement is an identical copy of the original, which was taken to the McAlpine collection in Oxfordshire.

=== Reinstatement of passing loop ===
An announcement on 16 September 2019 confirmed that a passing loop would be reinstated at Brading to allow trains to run at regular half-hourly intervals. £1 million to fund building the passing loop was to be from local sources with £300,000 from the Isle of Wight Council and the remainder from local businesses through the Solent Local Enterprise Partnership. A second platform would be opened to passenger use, according to the brief given to potential contractors for the work on the upgrade and the level crossing to the south of the station would be upgraded to give step-free access to the southbound platform. This work was completed in 2021.

== Facilities ==
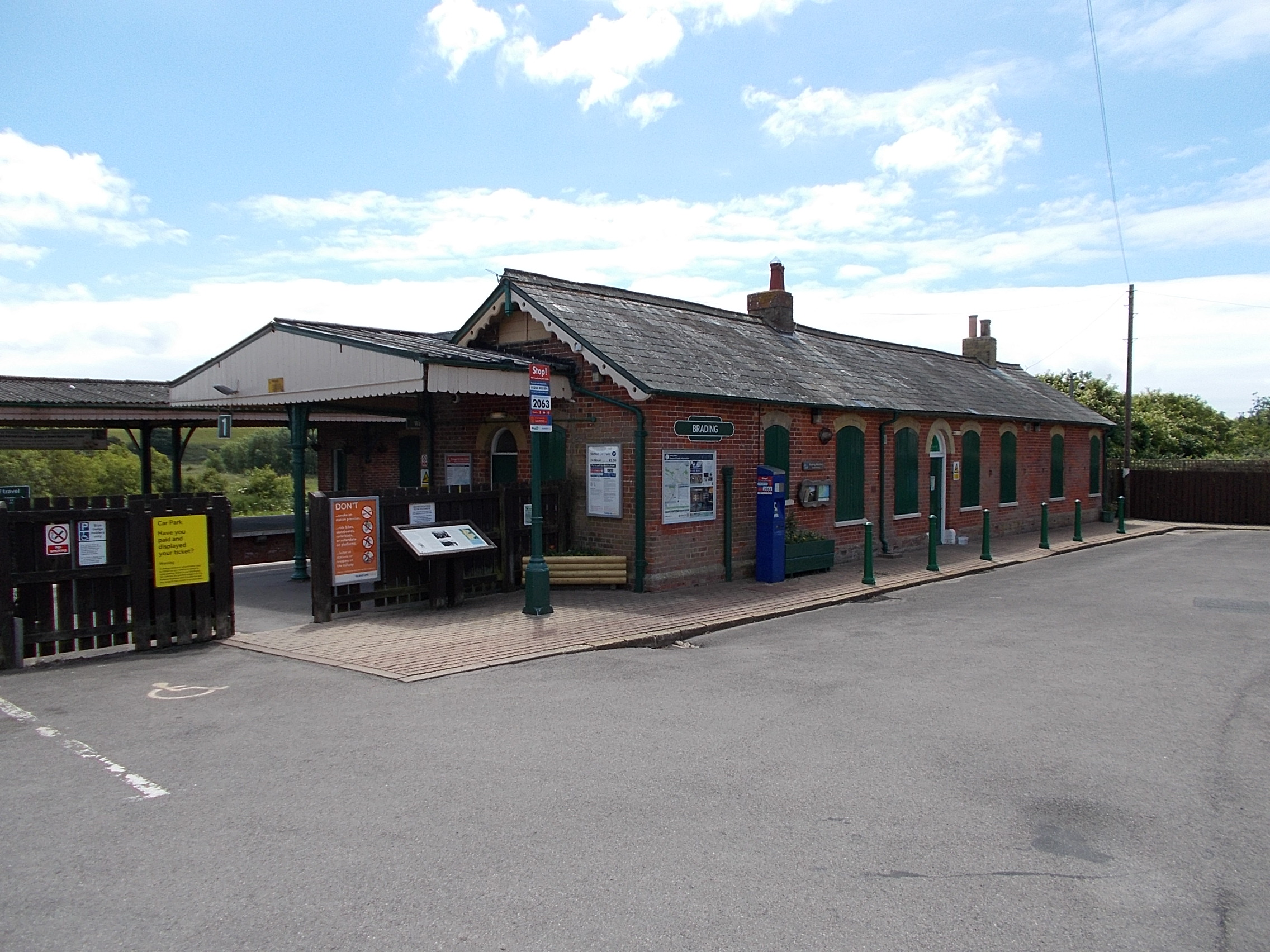
Exterior of station in 2017

The restored signal box and station buildings are now home to a railway heritage centre with a museum and café plus signal box tours. The railway heritage centre is open on selected days only.

No railway staff are present at the station, with tickets available from an automatic machine or from the guard on board the train.

== Services ==
All services at Brading are operated by Island Line using Class 484 EMUs.

The typical off-peak service in trains per hour is:

- 3 trains per 2 hours to Ryde Pier Head
- 3 trains per 2 hours to Shanklin

These services call at all stations, except Smallbrook Junction, which is served only during operating dates for the Isle of Wight Steam Railway.

Preceding station	Island Line	Following station
Smallbrook Junction towards Ryde Pier Head	Island Line Steam days only	Sandown towards Shanklin
Ryde St John's Road towards Ryde Pier Head	Island Line	Sandown towards Shanklin
Former lines
Terminus	Brading-Bembridge line	St Helens towards Bembridge
