= Bembridge =

Village on the Isle of Wight

Coordinates: 50.6897°N 1.0889°W

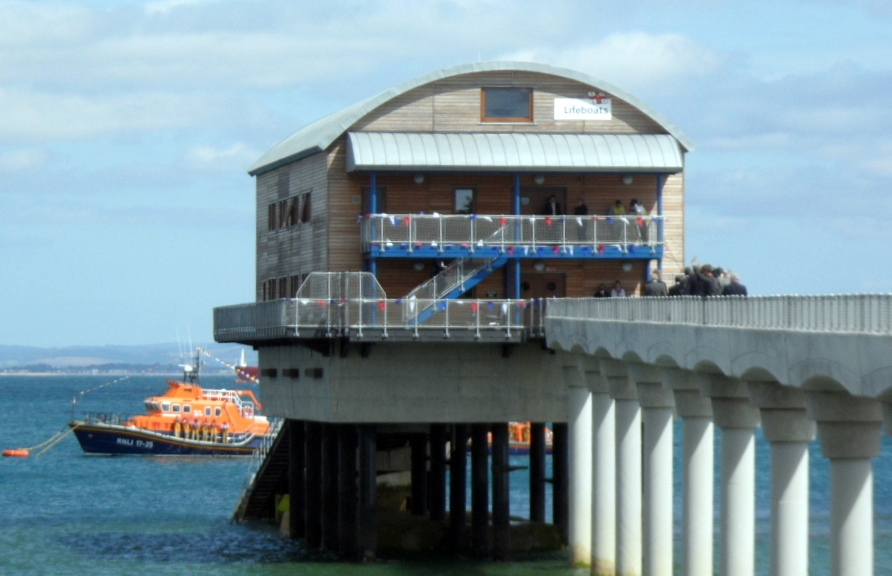
- Bembridge Lifeboat Station

- Location within the Isle of Wight
- Area: 9.1278 km^{2} (3.5243 sq mi)
- Population: 3,688 (2011 Census including Culver Down and Hillway)
  - Density: 404/km^{2} (1,050/sq mi)
- OS grid reference: SZ643882
- Civil parish: Bembridge
- Unitary authority: Isle of Wight
- Ceremonial county: Isle of Wight
- Region: South East
- Country: England
- Sovereign state: United Kingdom
- Post town: BEMBRIDGE
- Postcode district: PO35
- Dialling code: 01983
- Police: Hampshire and Isle of Wight
- Fire: Hampshire and Isle of Wight
- Ambulance: Isle of Wight
- UK Parliament: Isle of Wight East

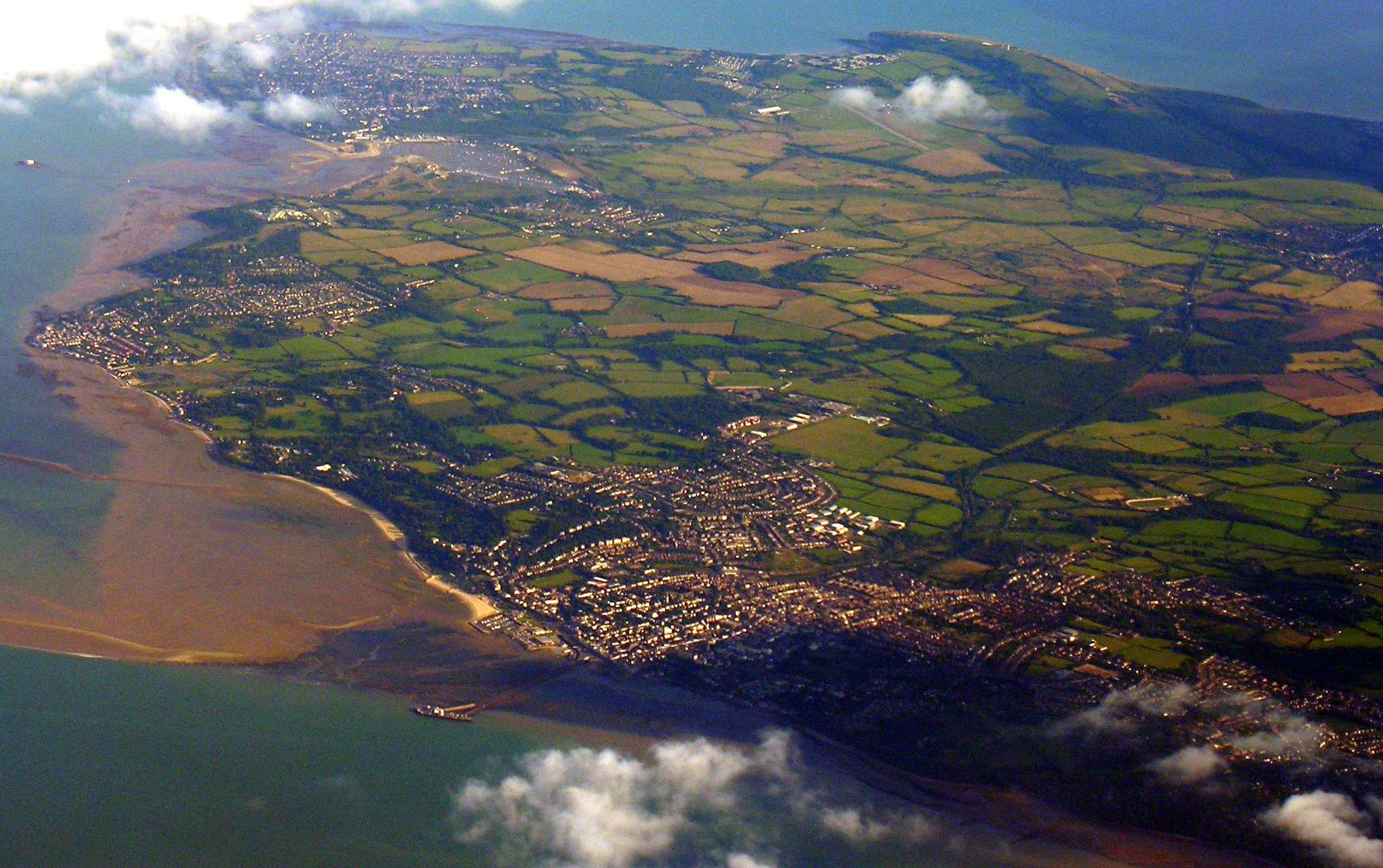
Aerial view of the north east of the Isle of Wight, with Bembridge at top left

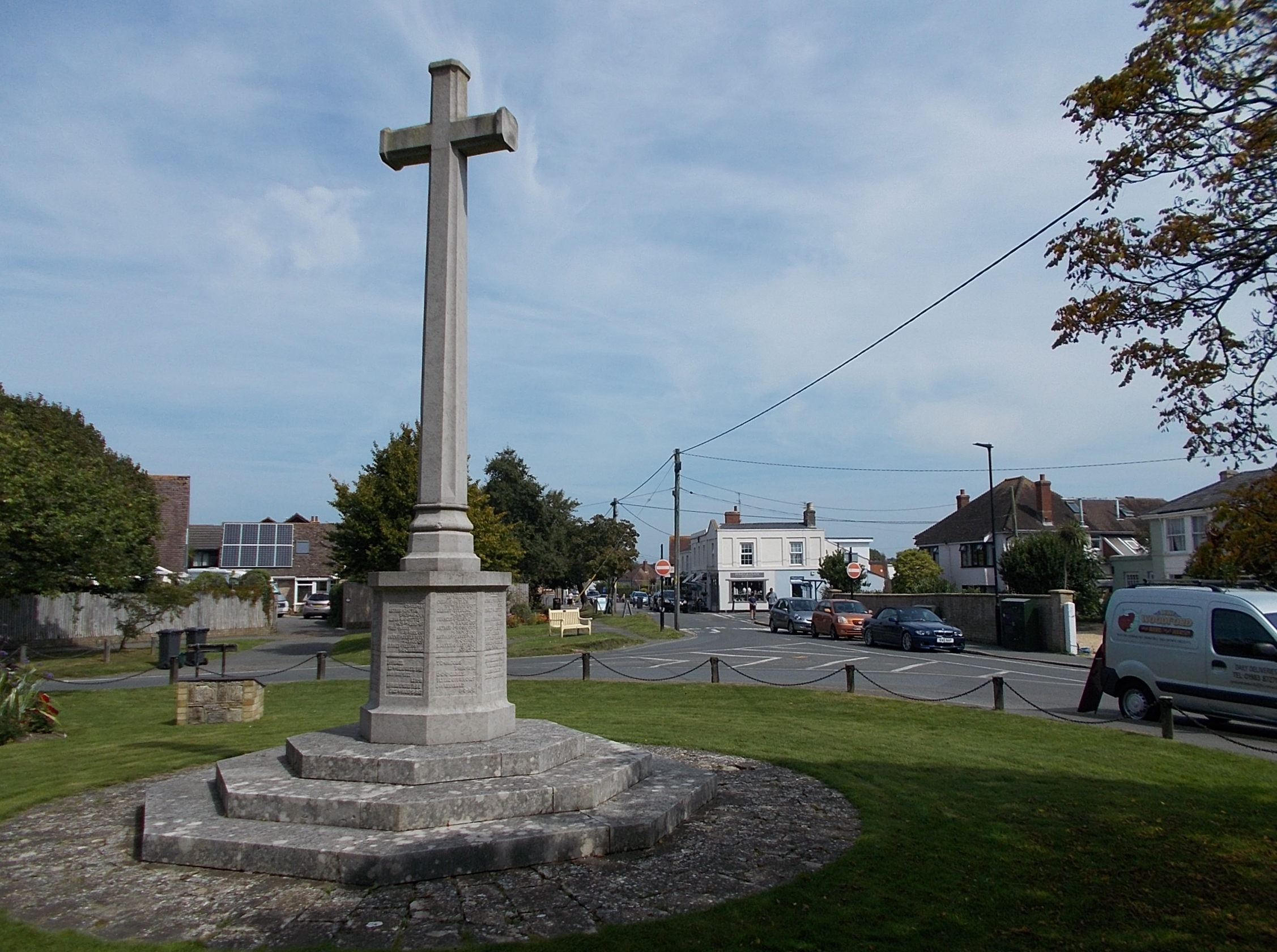
Bembridge village centre, with the war memorial in the foreground

Bembridge is a village and civil parish located on the easternmost point of the Isle of Wight. It had a population of 3,848 according to the 2001 census of the United Kingdom, leading to the implausible claim by some residents that Bembridge is the largest village in England. Bembridge is home to many of the Island's wealthiest residents. The population had reduced to 3,688 at the 2011 Census.

Bembridge sits at the extreme eastern point of the Isle of Wight. Prior to land reclamation the area of Bembridge and Yaverland was almost an island, separated from the remainder of the Isle of Wight by Brading Haven. On the Joan Blaeu map of 1665, Bembridge is shown as Binbridge Iſle, nearly separated from the rest of Wight by River Yar.

Prior to the Victorian era Bembridge was a collection of wooden huts and farmhouses, which only consolidated into a true village with the building of the church in 1827 (later rebuilt in 1846).

== Name ==
The name means '(the place lying) within the bridge' or 'this side of the bridge', from Old English binnan and brycg. The translation refers to Bembridge being on a peninsula at the easternmost point of the island, and as the Eastern Yar used to be a broad tidal creek as far as Brading and Sandown, being called The Isle of Bembridge (or Binbridge Isle on Speed's map of 1611). It could only be reached by boat or crossing a bridge at Yarbridge. The bridge was built ~1300, so the name cannot be from before that date. The older name is possibly Orham, since the village is possibly on the site of Orham Manor (in the Domesday Book). It means 'the river-meadow or promontory by the shore', from Old English ōra and hamm.

1316: Bynnebrygg

1441: Bynbrygge

1462: Binbrigge

1775: Bembridge

== Facilities ==
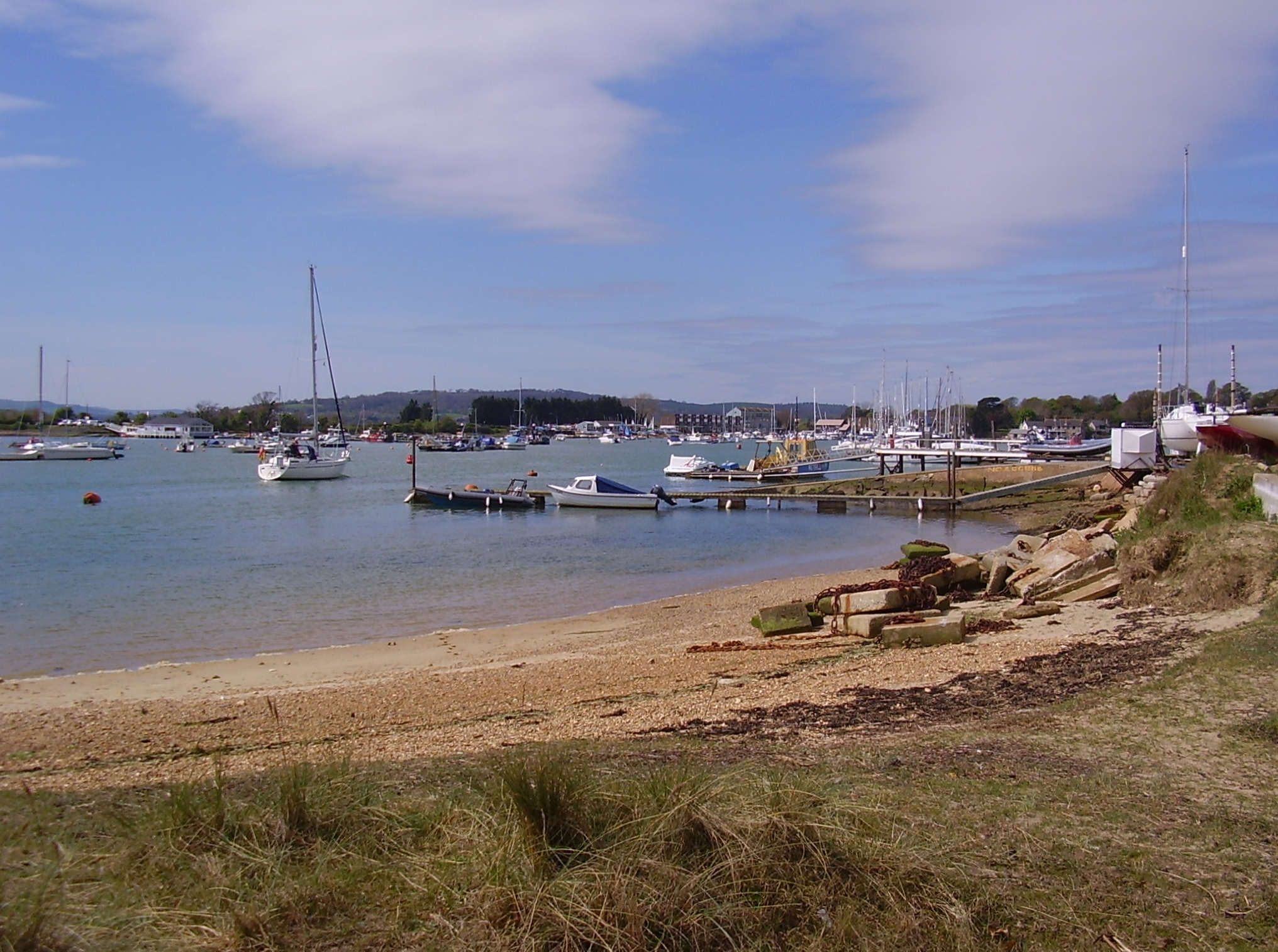
Bembridge Harbour

The historical heart of the village is located close to the church in the north of the village, consisting of a number of shops, pubs and restaurants, along with the Village Hall and site of the former Parish Council hall. Bembridge Library serves the community and there is a local museum in the same location.

Bembridge is a local service centre, hosting Bembridge C of E Primary School (see Education on the Isle of Wight for more information on the use of this term), a post office, several shops located in two main areas, and Methodist, Anglican and Catholic churches. It is also the location of a local fire station, (crewed by a team of retained firemen), and a Royal National Lifeboat Institution (RNLI) lifeboat station.

Bembridge Airport is a local airport with a concrete runway, and is located close to the Windmill to the south-west of the village proper heading towards Yaverland.

The Lane End district is located in the east of the village. It is largely composed of modern bungalows and a small shopping area which includes a Co-op store. The lane comes to an end at the beach, where Bembridge Lifeboat station and the Bembridge Coast Hotel are situated. The bungalows are built on the site of a cottage where Cecily Cardew lived, after whom an Oscar Wilde character was named. Further inland from Lane End is Bembridge C of E Primary School, along with the local community centre, which are connected by a large recreational playing field.

The Royal Isle of Wight Golf Club (now defunct) was located at St Helens Duver, across the harbour from Bembridge. The club was formed in 1882 and closed in the 1960s.

The war memorial was designed by local architect, Percy Stone (1856–1934).

=== Lifeboat station ===
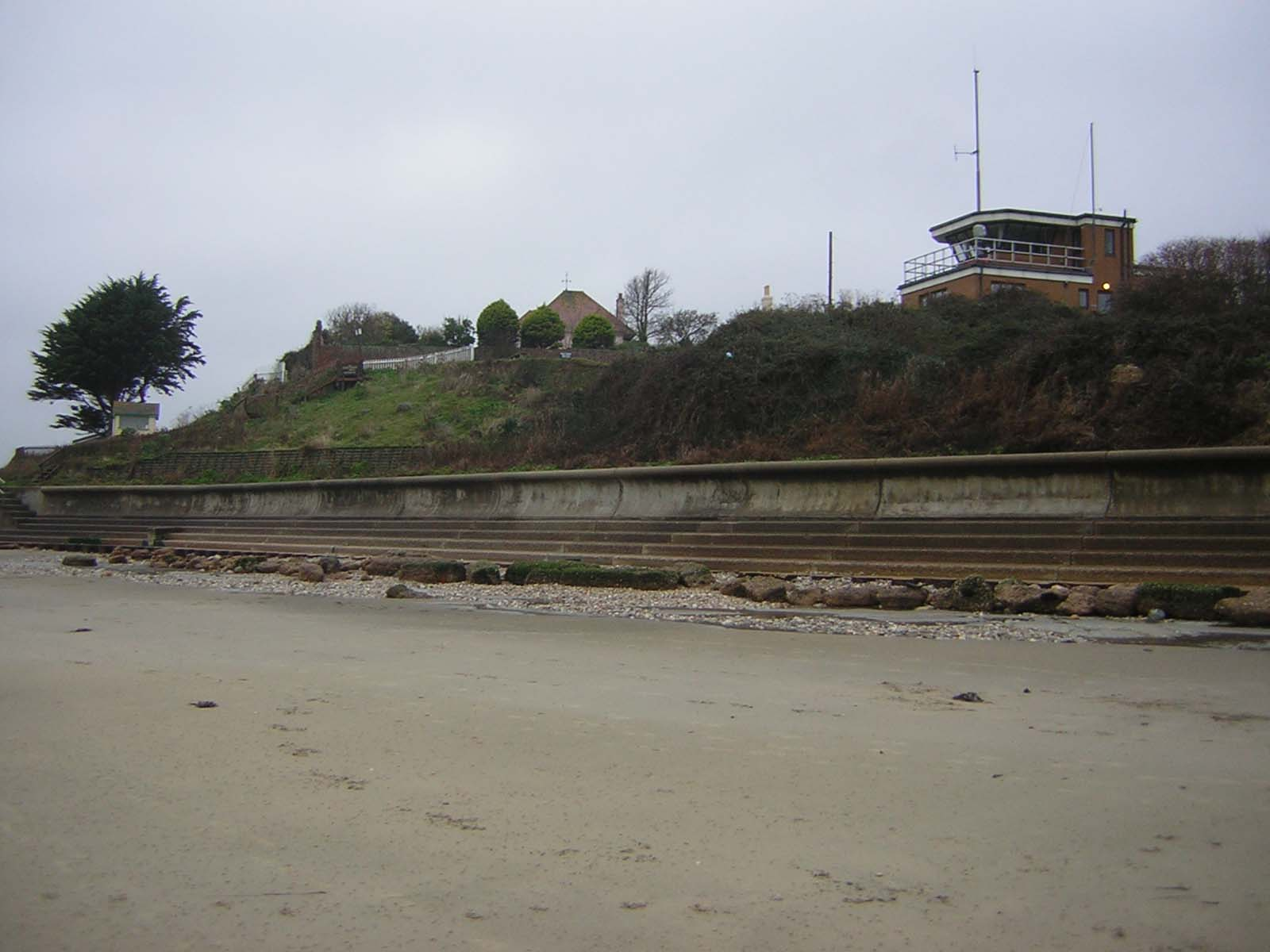
Seawall in Bembridge.

The RNLI station is particularly significant, as it extends into the sea to the east of the village. Here lies the notorious "Bembridge Ledge", a large, rocky outcrop which poses a major threat to passing boats. Although it is private sailing yachts which are most at risk, a wide variety of boats commonly run aground here, especially in the often stormy weather conditions which affect the Solent during winter months. A former Bembridge lifeboat, the RNLB Jesse Lumb (ON 822), is part of the National Historic Fleet, and exhibited at Imperial War Museum Duxford.

The current offshore boathouse was completed in Autumn 2010 by BAM Nuttall and Ecochoice and houses a new Tamar class boat, the 'Alfred Albert Williams'. A complete new concrete walkway was built, and the new station is made completely of naturally durable timber. The Inshore lifeboat station was rebuilt in 2014, and the interior of the offshore boathouse is accessible to visitors during set days when the station isn't on alert. The original Victorian boathouse also survives, and is currently used as the station's shop.

=== Coastguard lookout ===
Close to the lifeboat station lies a coastguard lookout. Positioned at a high elevation, this offers views of the Solent meeting the English Channel to the east of the Isle of Wight. From this vantage point one is able to view a variety of watercraft year round, although there is more marine traffic in the summer.

=== Bembridge Windmill ===
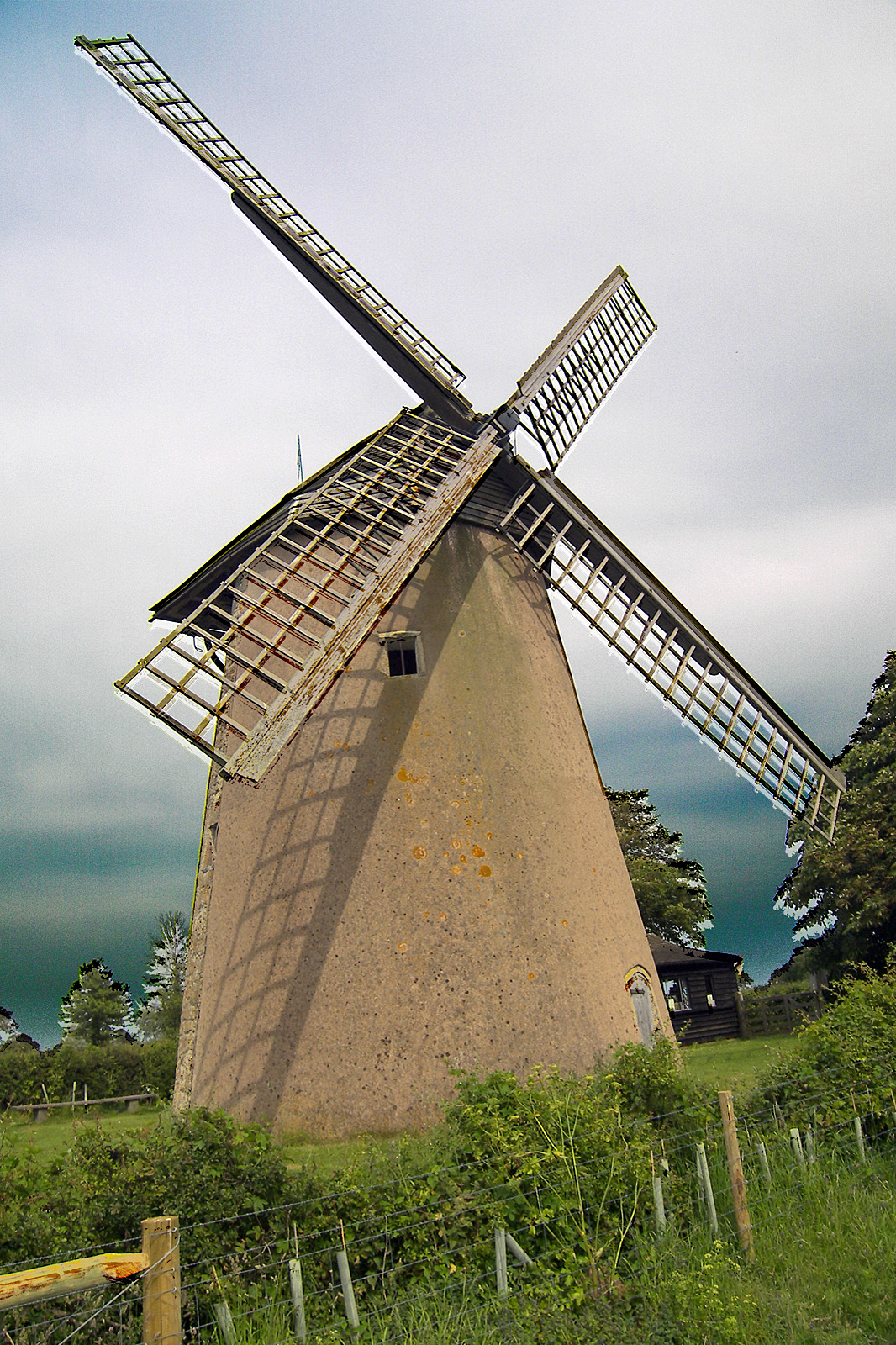
Bembridge Windmill

Bembridge Windmill, the only remaining windmill on the Isle of Wight, is located to the west of the village. Dating from around 1700, it is a National Trust property generally open from April to October.

== Politics ==
Bembridge is currently represented on the Isle of Wight Council by one member of the ward of Bembridge, St. Helens and Brading.

Bembridge is governed by a Parish council of 12 members. For parish council elections the village is divided into two wards, the North and South, each electing six members to the body. The parish council has succeeded in obtaining Lottery funding for improvements to the village recently, including a play-park in Steyne Park. It is also one of the few Parish Councils that has a village centre office open 5 days a week.

=== Twinning ===
Bembridge is twinned with Plédran, Brittany, France but in name only as the federation has lapsed through non-use.

== Transport ==
Public transport to Newport, Ryde and Sandown is provided by Southern Vectis bus route 8. An open-top bus service, The Downs Breezer, runs in the summer. Another summer-only service is the Island Coaster, which connects Bembridge with the main communities on the eastern and southern coasts and a variety of tourist attractions, including Blackgang Chine, Isle of Wight Pearl, and Alum Bay.

There was previously a ferry service running to St Helens, when the Eastern Yar was a tidal creek.

Bembridge railway station, which was located in the north-west of the village close to the harbour served the village, with services to Brading, until 1953. The station became derelict and was demolished around 1970.

== Religion ==
Bembridge is served by the Holy Trinity Church, built in the 1840s as a replacement for an 1827 church that had become unstable. St Luke's Mission Church opened as a chapel of ease to Holy Trinity Church in 1887, along with Bembridge Methodist Church and St Michael's Roman Catholic Church.

== Bembridge Boarding Campus ==
Bembridge School was taken over by Ryde School with Upper Chine in 1996, which turned the site into Bembridge Boarding Campus. This site also houses Kingswood Centre, which operates Kingswood during term-time and Camp Beaumont during school holidays, although it is closed for a few weeks in the winter.

== New House Bembridge School ==
New House Bembridge School is a Grade II Listed Building. Bembridge School Chapel is a Grade IIGV Listed Building featuring Edward Woore stained glass.
