= Bembridge Windmill =

Grade I listed windmill in Bembridge, United Kingdom

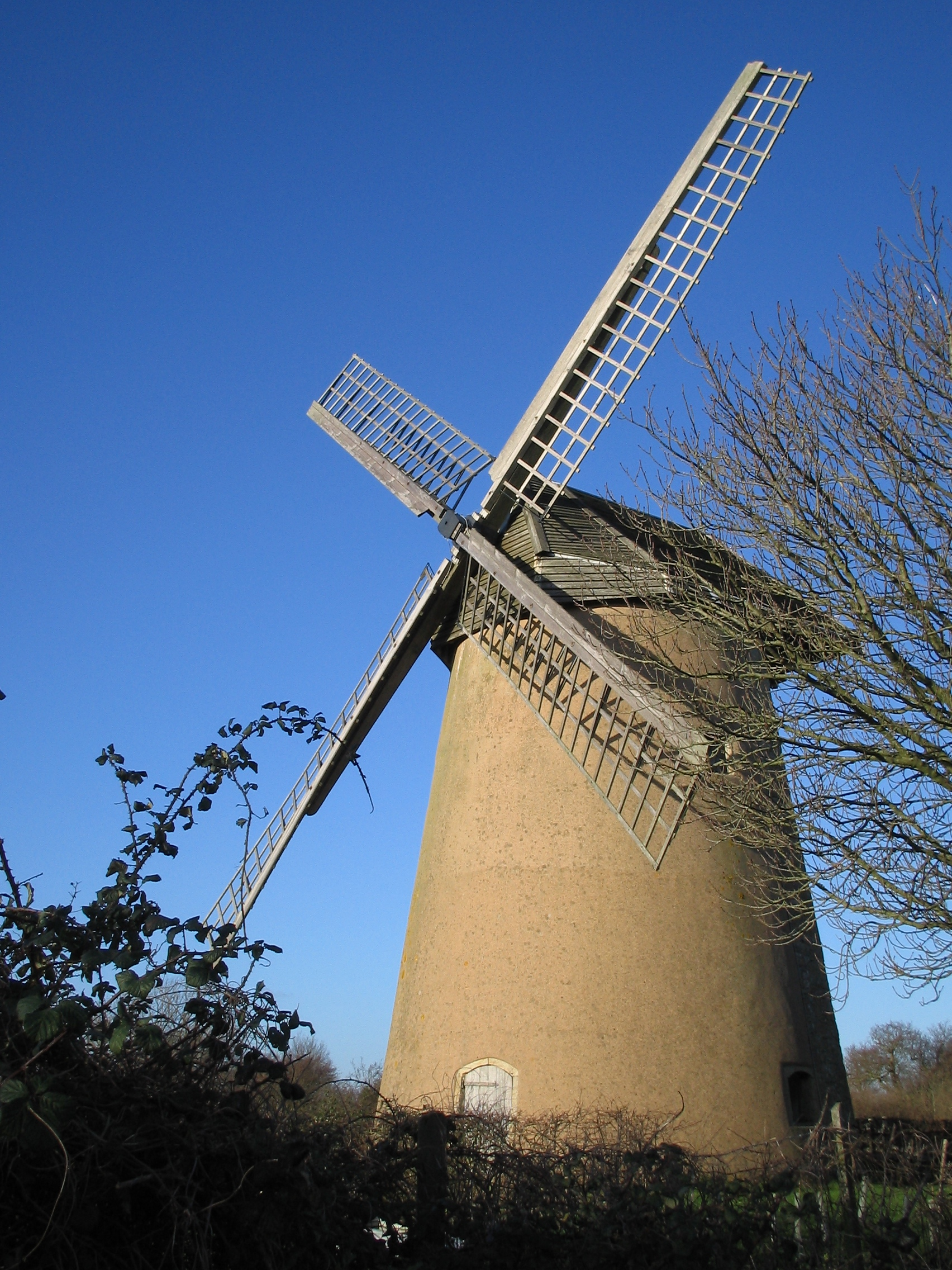
- Bembridge Windmill
- Interactive map of Bembridge Windmill

Origin
- Mill name: Knowle Mill
- Grid reference: SZ 6398 8747
- Coordinates: 50°41′00″N 1°05′45″W
- Operator: National Trust
- Year built: c1700

Information
- Purpose: Corn mill
- Type: Tower mill
- Storeys: Four storeys
- No. of sails: Four sails
- Type of sails: Common sails
- Winding: Hand winded by chain and wheel
- No. of pairs of millstones: Two pairs
- Other information: The only remaining windmill on the Isle of Wight

Listed Building – Grade I
- Designated: 16 April 1953
- Reference no.: 1034383

Knowle Mill, better known today as Bembridge Windmill, is a Grade I listed, preserved tower mill at Bembridge, Isle of Wight, England.

== History ==
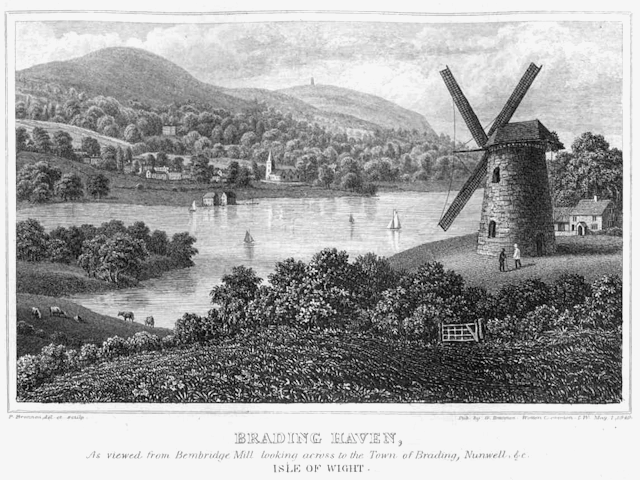
Bembridge Windmill in 1831 engraving

Bembridge Mill was built c. 1700. It was painted by Turner in 1795. The mill was working by wind until 1913, having only been used for grinding animal feed after 1897.

The mill was restored in 1935 and again in 1959, the latter restoration being funded by public subscription. In 1962 the mill was taken over by the National Trust. It has been restored and is open to the public. New sails were fitted to the mill in March 2021.

== Description ==
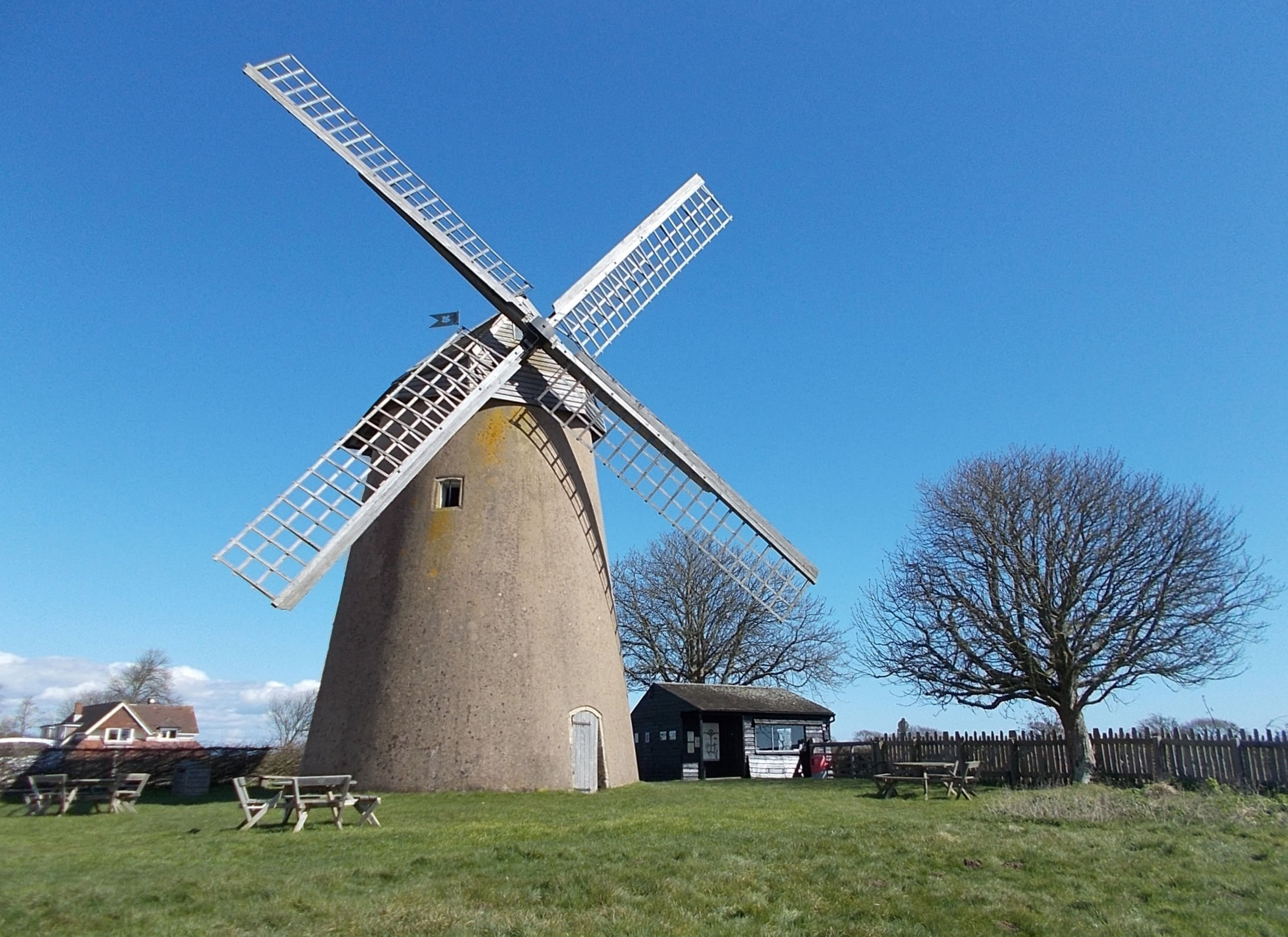
Bembridge Windmill, 2018 photograph

Bembridge Mill is a four-storey tower mill with a boat-shaped cap, which is winded by chain and wheel. It has four common sails. The two pairs of millstones are driven underdrift.

== Public access ==
Bembridge Windmill is open to the public between March and November, from 10:30 am to 5:00 pm daily. For more information please visit the National trust website.
