= Bembridge railway station =

Disused railway station in Isle of Wight, UK

Coordinates: 50°41′34″N 1°5′22″W

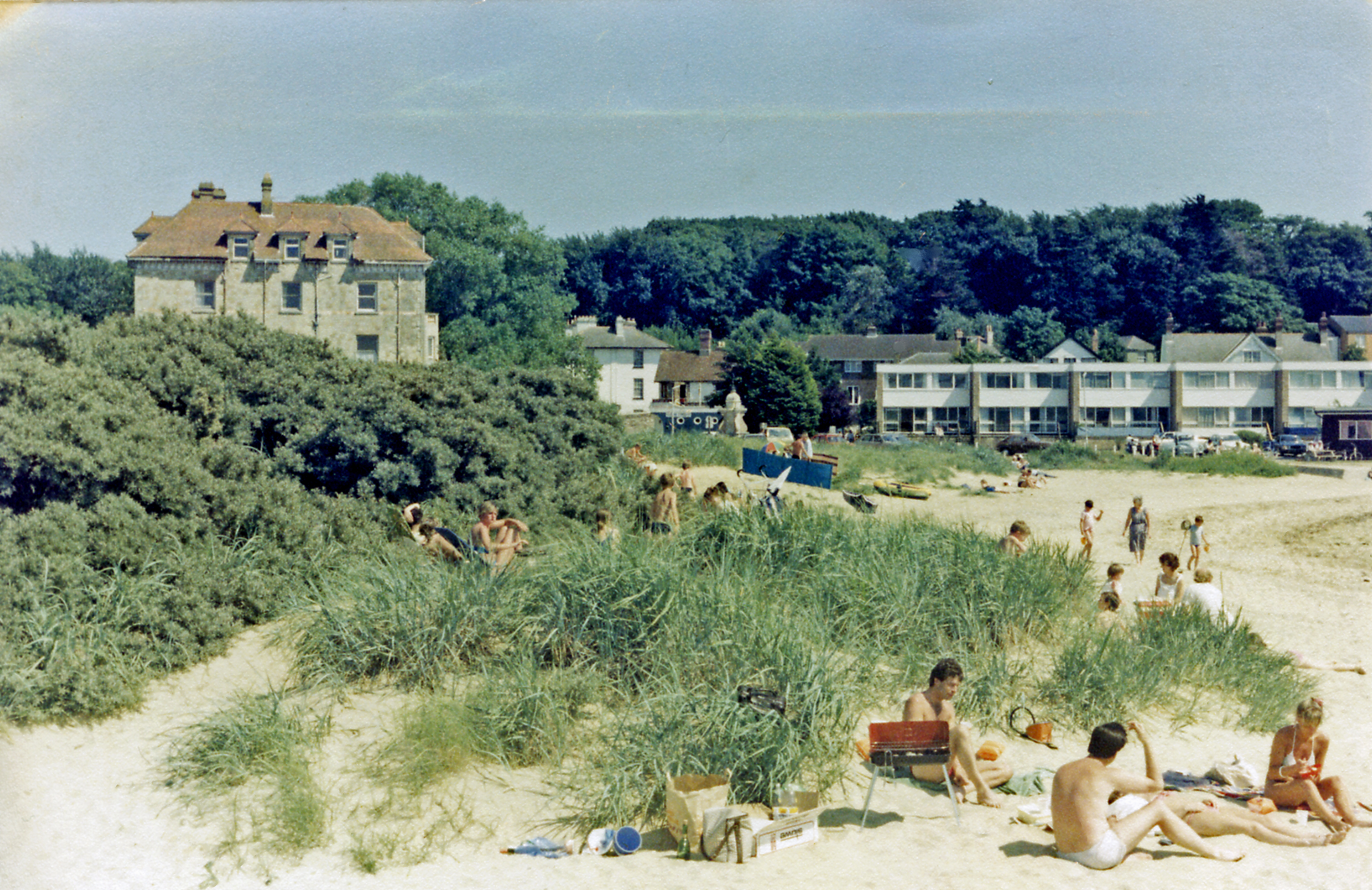
Site of Bembridge station, 1985

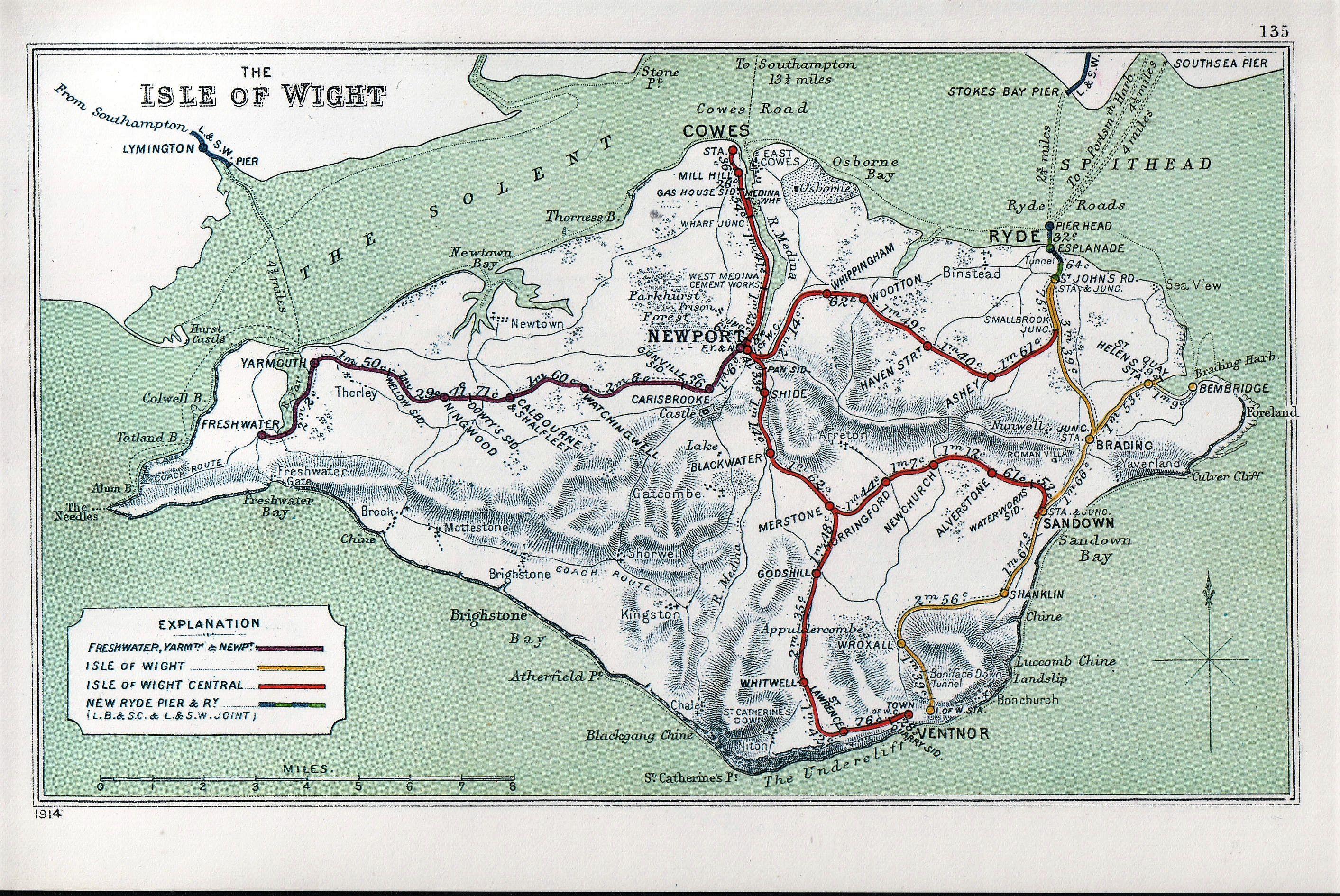
A 1914 Railway Clearing House map of lines around The Isle of Wight.

Bembridge was the terminus of the 2 3/4-mile (4 1/2 km) branch railway line that connected it to the main line at Brading on the Isle of Wight, England. On holiday Saturdays the sector table revolved continuously because the station area was too small to contain points.

== History ==
Opened in 1882, when the area contained the island's main port, it ran with ever-dwindling passengers until 1953. The station is long since demolished and a new development (Harbour Strand) in place.

== Stationmasters ==
- William Weeks 1881–1891
- Harry Owen Bench c. 1899–1902
- Walter John Daish 1908–c. 1915 (formerly station master at Ryde St John's)
- Martin Stanley c. 1951

Preceding station	Disused railways	Following station
St Helen's	British Railways; Southern Region; Isle of Wight Railway (Brading Harbour Improvement and Railway Company); Brading to Bembridge line	Terminus

== See also ==
- List of closed railway stations in Britain
