= Isle of Wight Railway =

British pre-grouping railway (1864–1922)

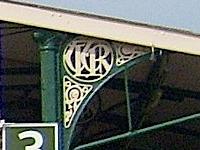
- Isle of Wight Railway monogram

History
- 1860: Act of Incorporation
- 1864: First train ran

Successor organisation
- 1923: "Grouping" into Southern Railway

Key locations
- Headquarters: Sandown station
- Workshops: Ryde Works
- Major stations: Ryde St John's Road; Sandown

Route mileage
- 1864: 7 1/4 mi (11.5 km)
- 1866: 11 1/4 mi (18 km)
- 1880*: 12 1/2 mi (20 km)
- 1882*: 15 1/4 mi (24.5 km); Mileage shown as at end of year stated. * - From 1880, includes running powers to Ryde Pier.

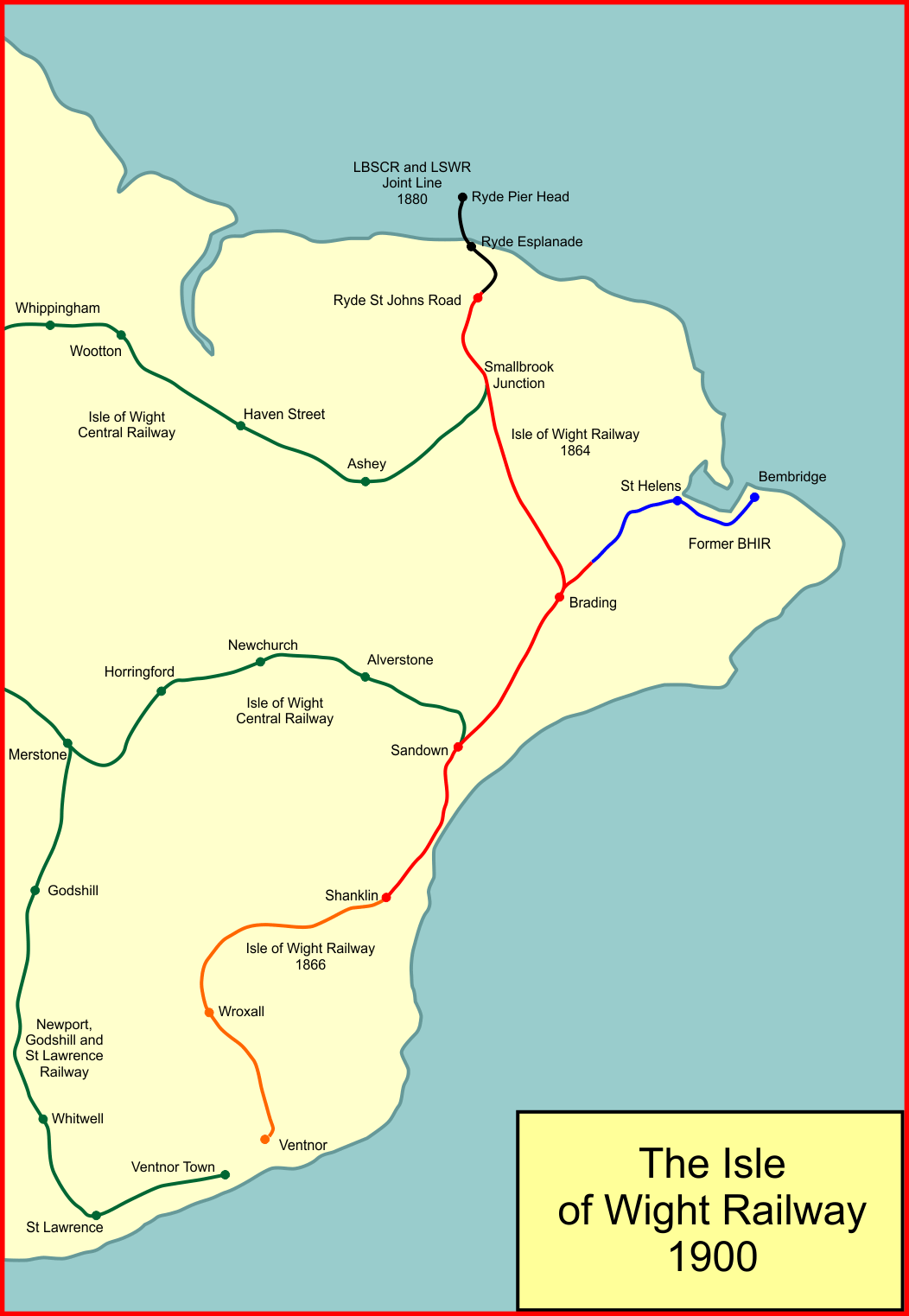
System map of the Isle of Wight Railway in 1900

The Isle of Wight Railway was a railway company on the Isle of Wight, United Kingdom; it operated 14 miles (23 kilometres) of railway line between Ryde and Ventnor. It opened the first section of line from Ryde to Sandown in 1864, later extending to Ventnor in 1866. The Ryde station was at St Johns Road, some distance from the pier where the majority of travellers arrived. A tramway operated on the pier itself, and a street-running tramway later operated from the Pier to St Johns Road. It was not until 1880 that two mainland railways companies jointly extended the railway line to the Pier Head, and IoWR trains ran through, improving the journey arrangements.

An independent company built a branch line from Brading to Bembridge, and the IoWR operated passenger trains on the line from 1882, and later absorbed the owning company. The IoWR was itself absorbed into the Southern Railway in the "grouping" of 1923.

The Bembridge branch closed in 1953, and in 1966 the Ryde Pier Head to Ventnor line was truncated to terminate at Shanklin. This was electrified, and former London Underground tube train stock was brought into use on the line; this arrangement continues to the present day.

== First proposals ==
In the first years of the 19th century, the Isle of Wight was established as a successful agricultural base, and there was some fishing. Cowes, on the River Medina, was the principal port, and Newport was the main industrial town. Ryde was an established town, but Shanklin had a population of 355 (in 1851) and Sandown was only a village.

The idea of visiting the Isle of Wight for reasons now described as tourism began to take hold, but these activities were limited by the poor internal transport facilities on the island. The easy money of the middle years of the 1840s encouraged the promotion of railway schemes, and in May 1845 public support was sought for an Isle of Wight Railway, which was proposed to build from West Cowes and Ryde to Newport and Ventnor. Capital of £300,000 was said to be necessary, but notwithstanding local support, the landowners to be affected were hostile and the scheme failed to gain approval.

Nevertheless, and in October of the same year a Direct Ryde and Ventnor Railway was proposed; requiring only £120,000 in capital it would follow much easier ground and claimed that landowners would not object to it; this scheme fared equally badly and was almost immediately abandoned. The end of the Railway Mania resulted in the cessation of railway scheme promotion for some time, and it was not until 1852 that further railways were proposed, but these too failed to gain support.

In 1858 three viable schemes were developed and their bills were deposited in Parliament; they were

- The Isle of Wight Railway (Eastern Section); (Note: This terminology is used by Maycock and Silbury prior to authorisation.) to run from Ryde to Upper Bonchurch, with branches to Brading and Shanklin, and a tramway to Ryde Pier; electric telegraphs were also included;
- The Isle of Wight Railway; to run from Cowes to Ryde via Newport, with branches to Ventnor and Ryde Pier;
- The Cowes and Newport Railway.

Of these, only the Cowes and Newport Railway was passed, as the Cowes and Newport (Isle of Wight) Railway Act 1859 (22 & 23 Vict. c. xciv), on 8 August 1859, the other two being rejected in the Lords' committee.

== A viable scheme ==
Isle of Wight Eastern Section Railway Act 1860
- Act of Parliament
- Parliament of the United Kingdom
- Long title: An Act for making Railways for the Purpose of connecting Ryde with Ventnor and the East Coast of the Isle of Wight, and for other Purposes.
- Citation: 23 & 24 Vict. c. clxii

Dates
- Royal assent: 23 July 1860

Text of statute as originally enacted

The promoters of the Eastern Section railway reconsidered the route they had proposed, and determined to improve on it by taking the line through Wroxall and ending it in Ventnor. They submitted a fresh bill for the 1860 session; the line was now to be named the Isle of Wight (Eastern Section) Railway. The Cowes and Newport Railway also submitted a bill, seeking to extend their railway and rename it The Isle of Wight Railway; the extensions were to be to Ryde and Ventnor, with a long line connecting the other two and forming a triangle. However this bill failed standing orders and was rejected. A number of objections to the IoW(ES)R Bill were heard, but none was effective and the bill secured the royal assent on 23 July 1860 as the Isle of Wight Eastern Section Railway Act 1860 (23 & 24 Vict. c. clxii).

The railway authorised was from Melville Street (at the south end of the later tunnel at Ryde) to Ventnor, with branches to Brading and Sandown Bay; the authorised share capital was £125,000. Melville Street was the nearest the railway could get to the pier without expensive tunnelling and a station was planned there. A street-running tramway was to reach the pier from there. (The Sandown Bay line and the extension north from St Johns Road to Melville Street were not built. The "branch to Brading" was a short line to a wharf on the river.)

The London, Brighton and South Coast Railway and the London and South Western Railway were authorised to raise £20,000 each and to subscribe that sum to the IoW(ES)R. Captain Mark Huish, formerly the ruthless and successful General Manager of the London and North Western Railway had retired and lived near Ventnor, and he was invited to assist the directors in planning their railway construction. Huish suggested that the railway contractor Thomas Brassey could be persuaded to build the line if the LBSCR and LSWR would subscribe their £20,000 and one of them would agree to work the line. The Directors were relieved to have Huish's experience on board—none of them had experience of railway construction. On 5 February 1861 Brassey's company undertook to build the railway for £123,000, but this was for a single track of railway and exclusive of land acquisition, legal costs, and stations. The sum would exhaust the company's share capital. Worse was to follow: the LBSCR and the LSWR were in a state of competitive hostility, and the idea of collaboration was impossible.

Negotiations dragged on for some time; the board earnestly hoped that Brassey could be persuaded to build the line, but without the guarantees Brassey feared that the company as his client would become insolvent, and he declined.

Early in 1862 tenders were considered by the board; none of them were acceptable or affordable. On 20 March 1862 the engineer John Fowler was appointed as Engineer to the Company. He was asked to review the design and specification for the line's construction, and on 4 November 1862 a quotation from Henry Bond was put to the board with Fowler's support. For £126,000 he would build the line from Ryde to Ventnor with a Brading branch. In the first days of 1863 this, the largest construction project on the island, started work. A further contract for £17,500 with Bond was later concluded for stations and signalling.

The Isle of Wight Eastern Section Railway Act 1860 had authorised an extension northwards from St Johns Road to Melville Street, in order to make a terminal there for a street-running tramway to the pier. Much controversy had been generated in Ryde over the adverse effect on amenity in the area, and the company decided on 12 March 1863 to abandon the attempt to extend to Melville Street. Discussions took place with the Ryde Pier Company with a view to joint construction of a railway to the pier, but the talks broke down and in 1864 the idea was dropped. The Sandown Bay branch, also authorised in 1860, was abandoned.

Isle of Wight Railway's (Extensions) Act 1863
- Act of Parliament
- Parliament of the United Kingdom
- Long title: An Act for changing the Name of the Isle of Wight Eastern Section Railway Company, and for authorizing them to make and maintain Railways (the Central Lines), in Extension of their authorized Railways (the Eastern Lines), and to raise Monies for the Purpose, and to make Arrangements with other Companies; and for other Purposes.
- Citation: 26 & 27 Vict. c. ccxxxii

Dates
- Royal assent: 28 July 1863

Text of statute as originally enacted

The company name was changed to the Isle of Wight Railway by the Isle of Wight Railway's (Extensions) Act 1863 (26 & 27 Vict. c. ccxxxii) of 28 July 1863. The name was considered to be more in keeping with the status of the company, as the bill had proposed a branch to Newport, there to join with the Cowes and Newport Railway. However negotiations with that company over the arrangements proved impossible, so that although the proposal had appeared in the bill, it was deleted before it was enacted.

Optimistic statements were made about early completion and opening of the line, but on 18 February 1864 a shareholders' meeting was informed that some land remained to be acquired for the line. Nevertheless, on 1 June 1864 the company secretary wrote to the Board of Trade giving notice that the railway would open in a month. There was then a delay with the rolling stock but Colonel Yolland made the Board of Trade inspection on 19 August. In fact this was only for the section from Ryde to Shanklin. Yolland found a number of detail points—the track ballast was chalk—but recommended approval for opening the line. The line opened from Ryde to Shanklin on 23 August 1864.

Carryings on the first section were encouraging, but constructing the tunnel at Ventnor was proving difficult. In fact the contractor was unable to complete it and went into administration, under its creditor, the finance company Warrant Finance. Eventually the work was substantially ready, although much cost-cutting had taken place. Colonel Yolland made an inspection in August 1866, but this time there were many deficiencies, including defective track. Receiving his report, the Board of Trade declined to approve the opening. Although the company was desperately short of money, it appears that some directors personally funded direct action by the contractor to rectify the problems, and Yolland reported again on 8 September 1866, this time recommending approval for the opening.

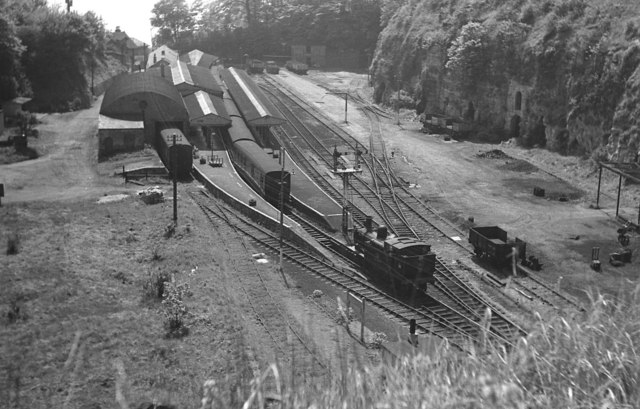
Ventnor station in 1963

On Monday 10 September 1866 the extension to Ventnor opened for passenger traffic; goods traffic did not require Board of Trade approval and had already been started. The station at Ventnor was reported to be "far from complete", and it was 294 feet (90 metres) above sea level. Ventnor tunnel was 1,312 yards in length.

During the 1860s the IWES built a short spur railway at Brading to a wooden wharf on the River Yar; the river was badly silted but small vessels could work on it.

The finances of the company had been severely strained; a shareholders' committee reported, "Your committee regret to have to state that the available assets at the disposal of the company are practically nil."

== Operation and traffic ==
There were eleven journeys each way on weekdays and two on Sundays when the line opened as far as Shanklin. The journey time was typically 25 minutes. By November 1864, the weekday service was reduced to seven trains each way. Passenger business was better than expected, although that at Brading was disappointing. When the line was extended to Ventnor, the same number of trains ran, and the journey time Ryde to Ventnor was 30 minutes.

The passenger accommodation at Ryde was extremely limited, and within two years a second platform was provided to handle a more frequent train service than had been envisaged. During this period a turntable was put out of use, as the entire locomotive stock was tank engines. At Shanklin the line originally ended in a turntable used for engine release purposes, but this too was removed when the line was extended to Ventnor.

The line was operated in two signal sections, from Ryde to Sandown and from Sandown to Ventnor, and the train staff and ticket system was used. Sandown was the only intermediate station at which passenger trains could cross, but the loop was on the north side of the station and only one platform was provided there. Ventnor station opened with a single narrow platform, but by 1872, a second platform face was provided there too.

By this time Ryde Pier (the second structure) was 745 yards in length, and travellers using it had a long walk to the shore; this was a serious competitive disadvantage compared to Cowes, where no such difficulty existed. A horse tramway started operation on the pier itself on 27 August 1864, but the gap from the pier to the station at St Johns Road had no railway connection, and for some time was a source of inconvenience.

Much of the seasonal traffic came from the mainland, and despite the inconvenience of the gap from the pier to the station, the traffic was buoyant. In 1867 it was decided to run 14 trains each way on weekdays, and this put a strain on the engine power available to the line. Goods traffic was run at night to free up the resources for passenger trains, but the goods traffic was important to the island economy; much of it came in through Brading Harbour. This included considerable volumes of building materials, feeding the development of residential and boarding house building.

In 1867, 384,000 passenger journeys were made, with goods traffic receipts amounting to about 10% of the passenger income. However, in that year working expenses had ballooned due to unspecified exceptional expenditure, (Note: In the year £28,000 had been spent on promotion of Parliamentary bills, £40,000 on land acquisition, and construction costs exceeded £157,000. These charges were capital expenditure, but may have been improperly charged to revenue account.) and slightly exceeded the gross income. In subsequent years working expenses settled down to 65% (1869) and 63% (1870) of gross receipts.

Maycock states that during the summer of 1867 there were extensive military manoeuvres in Sandown Bay and a temporary halt was opened, named either Yarbridge or Morton Common, but this is not confirmed by other sources.

The nuisance of the long gap between the pier and the IoWR station continued to be objectionable; a connection had long been proposed. A major difficulty was that local residents objected to the degradation of the view at the sea front by any tramway construction, as the gradients into the town would require substantial engineering works; moreover the foreseen smoke nuisance from locomotives was objected to. However on 7 August 1871, a street-running horse tramway was opened by the Ryde Pier Company between the pier and the station. The tramway terminated on the north side of St Johns Road and the railway was extended across the road to meet it. The station platforms were lengthened, and engine release movements from the platforms now had to cross the road twice to complete the manoeuvre. The tramway passed through an archway on the ground floor of a house (17 The Strand) at the junction of The Strand and Cornwall Street in Ryde; the archway has now been closed and a bay window installed.

Although business was brisk, the Company was perpetually short of capital, and some dubious measures were adopted; income rose during 1872 but it was swallowed up by pre-existing cash liabilities. The Board negotiated a bank loan of £1,500 to pay interest on other loans, and this loan had to be guaranteed by a director personally. That year the Board declared a dividend on its preference stock, although payment had to be made by the issue of additional preference stock.

An accident took place on 15 April 1871 when two trains collided head on in the single line section near Sandown. It emerged that the train staff and ticket regulations for operating single lines safely were frequently ignored by the signalmen.

== IoWR rolling stock ==
At the outset, the Isle of Wight Railway ordered a fleet of standardized tank engines from Beyer Peacock, as well as 24 passenger carriages, four of which had brake compartments, and 30 open wagons from the Oldbury Carriage and Wagon Company. In 1865, the railway ordered 10 more wagons and bought two carriages from the Ryde Pier Company. In 1872, a luggage van was also added to the stock. In 1873 five third class coaches were ordered. Three second class coaches were purchased in 1875 and another luggage van in 1876. In 1882, two composite coaches and four seconds were ordered, the last new carriages bought for the railway. In 1885, three carriages were bought from the Oldbury Company; they had originally been built for the Golden Valley Railway in 1881 but returned when that company was unable to pay for them. These were two saloons, one first class and one second class; the third vehicle was a brake van. Between 1897 and 1898, the IWR purchased ten second-hand North London Railway carriages. Six were first class and four second. The first class vehicles entered service as a first (later converted to a composite), a composite and four seconds. Of the NLR carriages bought as seconds three became thirds while the fourth and two Oldbury carriages were rebuilt at Ryde to passenger luggage vans. In 1914 eighteen former Metropolitan Railway carriages were acquired, enabling scrapping of many of the earliest vehicles. Two more were withdrawn in 1920 with the remaining 49 lasting to grouping in 1923. At the grouping, the IWR had 38 passenger coaches and 19 non-passenger coaching stock vehicles. The passenger coaches comprised twenty third-class (allotted SR numbers 2421–40) and eighteen composites (SR nos. 6329–46). The non-passenger coaching stock comprised ten passenger guard's vans (SR 980–9), seven open carriage trucks (4378–84). one luggage van (2231) and one horse box (3368).

There were 221 goods vehicles lasting to grouping in 1923. These comprised 189 open goods wagons (allotted SR numbers 27787–27975), thirteen flat trucks (SR nos. 59011–23), twelve covered goods wagons (SR 46975–86), three cattle wagons (53377–9), two tar tanks (61381–2) and two brake vans (56033–4). In addition to these, there were three in departmental stock: two travelling cranes (SR nos. 425S and 426S) and a match truck (SR no. 426SM). The open goods wagons were also used for coal, and had carrying capacities ranging from 5 to 15 long tons (5.1 to 15.2 t). The flat trucks included five designated as timber trucks – these had a transverse bolster to support the load. The two cranes were both hand-operated, and could lift 2 and 10 long tons (2.0 and 10.2 t) respectively; and the match truck was used to support the jib of crane no. 426S when travelling.

== Other railways ==
The Cowes and Newport Railway had been the first line to be opened on the Isle of Wight, in 1862.

A connection to Ryde was made by the Ryde and Newport Railway, which met the IoWR at Smallbrook, two miles (three kilometres) south of Ryde. The IoWR constructed a second track alongside its own from Smallbrook to Ryde and the R&NR used that track and the IoWR Ryde station, paying a rental for the purpose. The R&NR opened to traffic from a station near Newport on 20 December 1875. The RNR asked the IoWR to work their line and that belonging to the Cowes & Newport Railway, but the IoWR shareholders voted the proposal down. The RNR was worked by locomotives loaned by Henry Martin, the contractor working the CNR; six months later a Joint Committee of the two companies took over the operation of their railways.

The Isle of Wight (Newport Junction) Railway constructed a line between Sandown, on the IoWR, and Newport. The company experienced difficulties in finalising the access to Newport, and the line opened between Sandown and Shide on 1 February 1875, later extending to Newport on 1 June 1879. In 1880 the line was purchased by the Cowes and Newport company.

== Proposed unification of island railways ==
The idea that the Island railways should be worked as one entity by a joint committee of the LSWR and LBSCR was gaining support. In December 1875 Herapath's Railway Journal reported a story that the mainland companies had offered to work the Isle of Wight railways for 50 per cent of gross receipts and claimed that such a course would be profitable to all concerned. Maycock and Silbury say, "They reckoned without the IoWR shareholders who knew their company already cost less than 50 per cent to operate and, being the most profitable of the Island railways, an agreement of this nature would benefit other companies at their expense." They quote 47% (on page 86) but 73% in 1871 and 50% in 1880.

== Extending to Ryde Pier ==
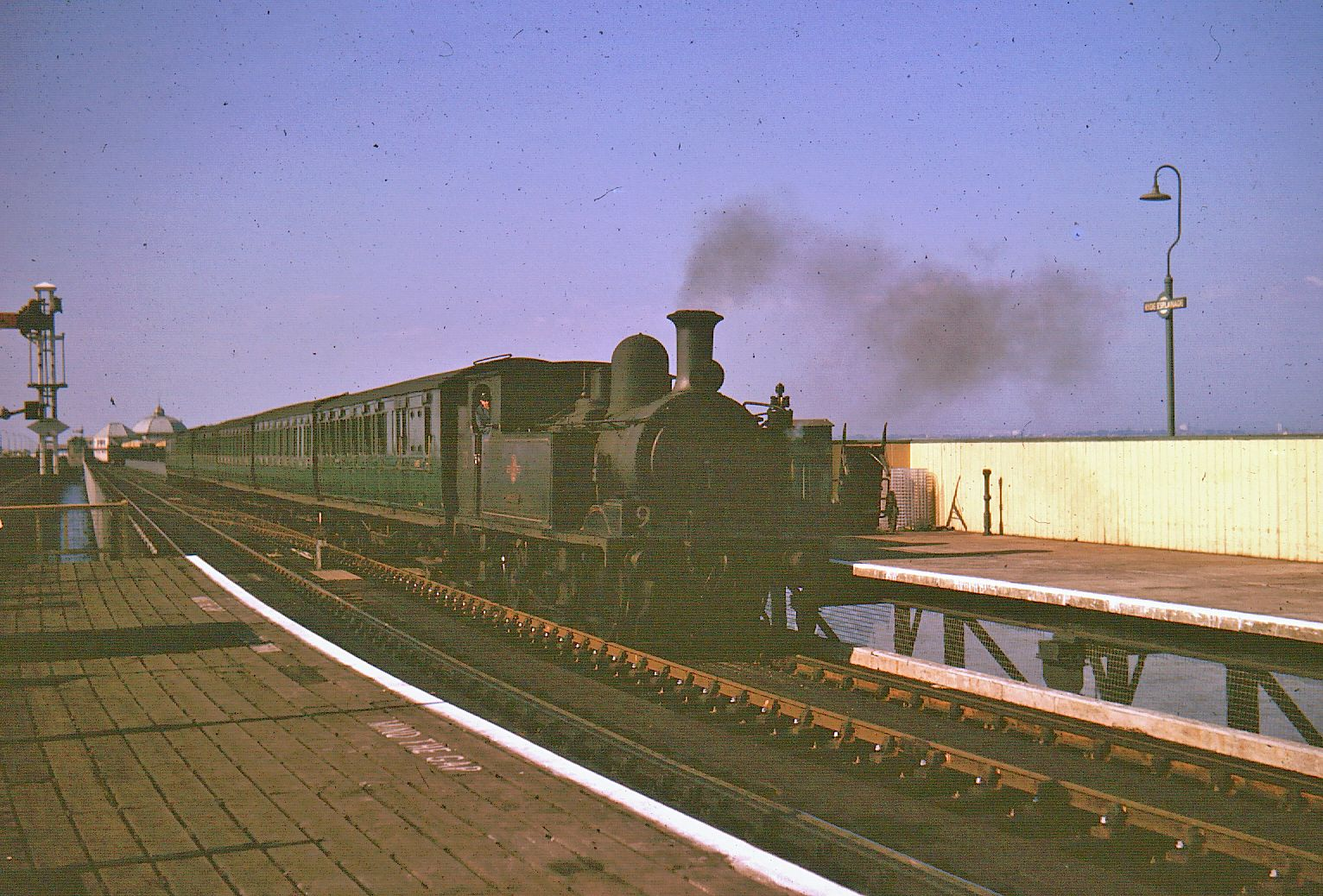
A train at Ryde Esplanade in 1964

Isle of Wight Railway (Steamers) Act 1865
- Act of Parliament
- Parliament of the United Kingdom
- Long title: An Act for authorizing the Isle of Wight Railway Company to provide and work Steam Vessels, and to provide Accommodation for Traffic thereby, and to raise further Monies; and for other Purposes.
- Citation: 28 & 29 Vict. c. clvii

Dates
- Royal assent: 29 June 1865

Text of statute as originally enacted

The 1 1/4-mile (2-kilometre) horse tramway from Ryde Pier to the IoWR St John's Road station was overwhelmed by the numbers of passengers during the summer months, and many proposals were put forward for the construction of a railway. Delegations of local people in the island attended meetings with a joint committee of the LSWR and LBSCR, and they demanded a proper railway at Ryde. The two mainland companies had collaborated in forming a joint connection to Portsmouth on the mainland and saw that their business to the Isle of Wight was limited by the poor connection at Ryde, so they acceded to the idea, and agreed to construct the link themselves.

South-western and Brighton Railway Companies (Isle of Wight and Ryde Pier Railway) Act 1877
- Act of Parliament
- Parliament of the United Kingdom
- Long title: An Act to authorize the Construction of a Railway and Railway Pier at Ryde in the Isle of Wight and for other purposes.
- Citation: 40 & 41 Vict. c. cvii

Dates
- Royal assent: 23 July 1877

Text of statute as originally enacted

A bill was submitted to the 1877 session of Parliament for powers to build a widened pier and a railway to St John's Road, in tunnel for much of the way from the Esplanade. The mainland companies intended to operate the trains themselves as far as St Johns Road; the island companies would take them on from there. The South-western and Brighton Railway Companies (Isle of Wight and Ryde Pier Railway) Act 1877 (40 & 41 Vict. c. cvii) passed on 23 July. On further consideration it was agreed that the IWR and R&NR would have running powers to the Pier Head and work their own trains through; they would pay a toll of 3d per passenger booked to or from Ryde, including St Johns Road. Construction began during 1878 and took two years to complete; the St Johns Road level crossing was replaced by a bridge. The difficulty of passing the new line under the Esplanade, considered an important beauty spot in Ryde, led to the line being built with a low headroom (at 12 ft 3in); this was to limit the introduction of some traction designs in later years. IoWR trains began working to Ryde Esplanade station on 5 April 1880 and to Ryde Pier Head on 12 July 1880; the horse tramway was shortened to serve the length of the pier only. The new railway did not carry goods traffic.

The pier was unique in the United Kingdom in having a complete railway station at its seaward end; the railway on the pier formed a single signalling section, from Pier Head to Esplanade.

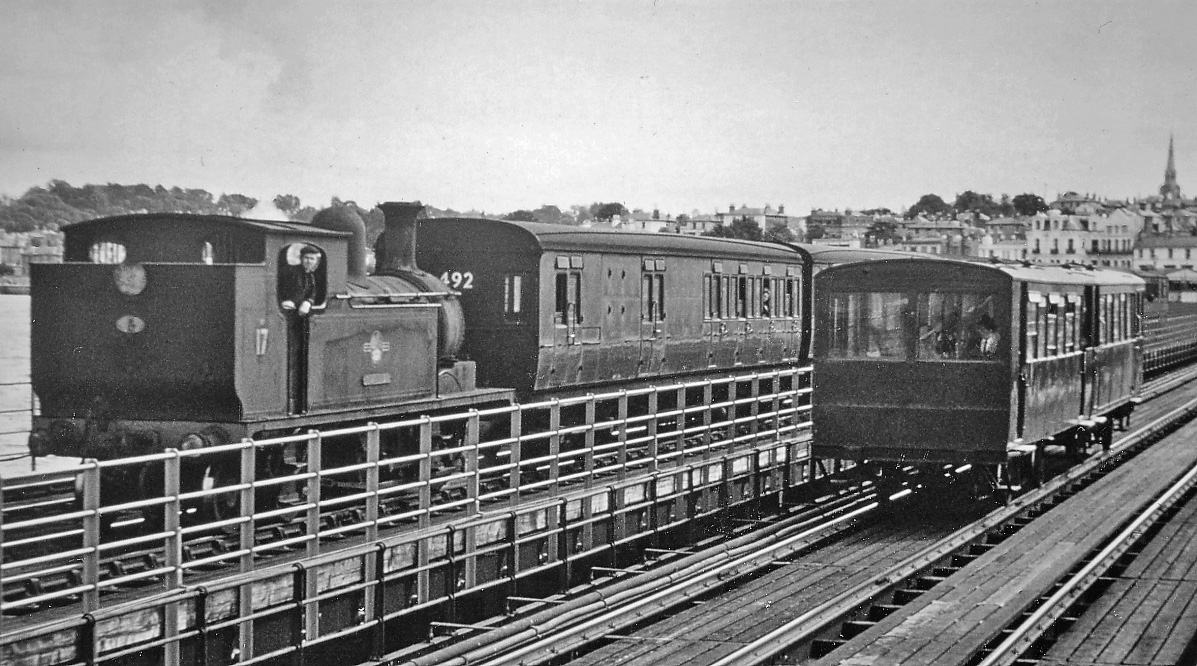
Ryde Pier with a steam train and electric tramcar

Five or six steamers could berth at the pier simultaneously. The Port of Portsmouth and Ryde United Steam Packet Company operated the ferry between Portsmouth and Ryde, but in 1879 the LSWR and LBSCR secured an act of Parliament, the South Western and the Brighton Railway Companies (Steam Vessels) Act 1879 (42 & 43 Vict. c. xxx) authorising the raising of £50,000 each to begin a competing service. In fact the ferry company decided to sell its business to the railway companies, and it did so in 1880.

At Ryde, the opening of the LSWR/LBSCR joint railway in 1880 at least meant that passengers could board a through carriage there for Ventnor or Newport. The IoWR claimed compensation for the 'injurious' effects of the railway on its property at St John's Road. A refreshment room at St Johns Road would suffer loss of business, they claimed, The issue went to arbitration and the IoWR was awarded £1,033. The change revolutionised passenger transport to the island and Portsmouth became the principal mainland access point.

The pier tramway was converted to electric traction in 1886; the electricity was generated by an Otto gas engine and a Siemens dynamo, an arrangement that continued until 1927.

== Financial situation improved ==
The IWR's financial performance improved in the 1880s. The company acquired additional locomotives and rolling stock; stations were enhanced and track renewals were carried out. There was opposition from some shareholders who saw the expenditure as money that should be distributed to them as dividends.

Isle of Wight Railway Act 1890
- Act of Parliament
- Parliament of the United Kingdom
- Long title: An Act to confer further powers on the Isle of Wight Railway Company to consolidate and re-arrange the capital of that Company and for other purposes.
- Citation: 53 & 54 Vict. c. cxxxvii

Dates
- Royal assent: 25 July 1890

Text of statute as originally enacted

Shareholder dissatisfaction with the management of the IoWR continued to simmer despite the declaration of the highest-ever dividend on the ordinary stock. At a shareholders' meeting on 21 February 1883, a shareholder complained that running costs were too high, at 53% of gross receipts. In fact shareholders could expect a regular dividend as high as any paid by a railway company in Great Britain, but the differing classes of stock, with preference and debenture issues, which had differing levels of dividend distribution, continued to generate dissatisfaction. In 1889 the company placed a bill before Parliament to consolidate and rearrange the capital: it received royal assent as the Isle of Wight Railway Act 1890 (53 & 54 Vict. c. cxxxvii) on 25 July 1890. The authorised capital was £402,312 and borrowings amounted to £196,911.

== Safety improvements ==
The absence of modern safety devices became an issue for practically all the railways of Great Britain in the 1870s, and in October 1875 a proposal had been put forward for the introduction of block signalling. Preece's Block Instruments were installed between Ryde and Sandown, and a new signal box was commissioned at Brading in 1882. The trains staff and ticket system was still in use, but in April 1891 trials began with the Webb and Thompson Electric Train Staff; by September 1891 the whole line from Ryde to Ventnor was equipped. Continuous brakes too were now a necessity and in January 1892 the board decided to fit the Westinghouse air brake at an estimated cost of £1,740.

The layout at Shanklin was considerably altered to allow trains to cross at the station; the use of a second passenger platform required a subway.

== Passenger timetable ==
The popularity of Ventnor as a winter resort for invalids led to the introduction of a special train in the Autumn of 1891. The LBSCR operated a fast train that left London Victoria station at noon. After the ferry crossing an IoWR train left Ryde Pier Head at 15:15 and ran non-stop to Ventnor in 21 minutes.

In the winter of 1894-1895 there were 12 return workings to Ventnor, increasing to 16 on Saturdays in summer.

== Bembridge branch ==
=== Brading Harbour Improvement Company ===
Brading Harbour Improvement, Railway and Works Act 1874
- Act of Parliament
- Parliament of the United Kingdom
- Long title: An Act for making an Embankment and Landing Quays at Brading Harbour, and a Railway in connexion therewith; and for other purposes.
- Citation: 37 & 38 Vict. c. cxcv

Dates
- Royal assent: 7 August 1874

Text of statute as originally enacted

Brading Harbour was located at Bembridge, a few miles from the village of Brading, and the harbour was doing good business. On 7 August 1874, the Brading Harbour Improvement Railway and Works Company obtained an authorising act of Parliament, the Brading Harbour Improvement, Railway and Works Act 1874 (37 & 38 Vict. c. cxcv), to build an embankment between St Helens and Bembridge, quays near St Helens Mill and a railway along the north edge of the harbour to join the short IoWR Brading wharf goods branch. The authorised capital was £40,000. The company evidently found it difficult to raise the cash as the company was soon mortgaged to the House and Land Investment Trust Company Limited. The line appears to have opened for goods traffic on 29 August 1878, probably only between Brading IoWR and St Helens.

Brading Harbour Improvement, Railway and Works (Additional Powers) Act 1881
- Act of Parliament
- Parliament of the United Kingdom
- Long title: An Act for reviving the powers and extending the time for the completion of a portion of the Railway and Works authorised by the Brading Harbour Improvement Railway and Works Act 1874 and for other purposes.
- Citation: 44 & 45 Vict. c. xxiv

Dates
- Royal assent: 3 June 1881

Text of statute as originally enacted

Completion of the harbour barrier proved difficult, partly due to damage by storms, and a further act of Parliament, the Brading Harbour Improvement, Railway and Works (Additional Powers) Act 1881 (44 & 45 Vict. c. xxiv), had to be secured for an extension of time. This act also permitted the company to operate steam vessels between Brading Harbour and mainland ports. By June 1881 the BHIR was in the hands of a receiver. That month a Sunday School excursion train took local children to Ryde; a temporary platform was erected. Now in serious financial difficulties, the BHIR gave notice that its goods service between St Helens and Brading would be discontinued; whether the IoWR immediately took over working the goods trains in 1881 is not clear.

In an agreement of 28 February 1882 the Brading company and the IoWR arranged that the latter would work the line as part of its system for 50% of gross receipts. The IoWR used two BHIR locomotives, named St Helens and Bembridge, but provided rolling stock, station and maintenance staff itself. On 25 May 1882 Colonel Yolland inspected BHIR line, as well as the enlarged IoWR junction station at Brading and the IoWR goods branch to Brading Quay. Except for some attention to fencing, he found the BHIR line in good condition for the opening to passenger trains; there were stations at St Helens and Bembridge. The IoWR line was 43 chains in length; Brading station had been altered to provide a bay platform for the branch and a run-round loop; there was a level crossing near Brading Quay. The railway opened to passenger traffic on 27 May 1882. Because of lack of space at Bembridge station a sector plate was installed to give access to the run-round loop. It was of 16 ft 5 in length, but in 1936 it was replaced by a 25 ft turntable, for the introduction of the larger O2 class engines.

The BHIR's primary interest had been developing the harbour and reclaiming land, but a general decline in agricultural land values wiped out that benefit. In April 1883 the IoWR Board decided to charge interest at 7 1/2% on the cost of enlarging Brading station for the BHIR. Steamers from the mainland started calling at Bembridge, and although this competed with the IoWR's traffic at Ryde, the company agreed to operate trains in connection with those steamers.

=== A train ferry ===
The North British Railway had long been operating a train ferry for crossing the Firth of Forth and the Firth of Tay, and in 1881 Samuel L. Mason, former General Manager of the NBR, promoted the idea of a train ferry between the mainland and the Isle of Wight at St Helens. When the Tay crossing ceased operation in 1881, Mason purchased one of the vessels, the paddle steamer Carrier, as well as the approach ramps and winching gear, for £3,400. He made agreements with the LBSCR and the BHIR to construct transfer equipment at St Helens and at Langstone near Havant. (Note: Langstone is the spelling of the location; the railway station on the Hayling Island branch line was named Langston.) On 14 February 1884 the Isle of Wight Marine Transit Company Limited was formed with capital of £30,000. The Transit company took over the agreements and the Carrier and the shore equipment for £28,425. Carrier could carry up to 14 wagons on two tracks, each having a maximum load of four tons.

The transfer ramps were installed at St Helens and Langstone, and services began on 1 September 1885, used by the LBSCR. In practice Carrier had difficulties in operating in the exposed waters of the Eastern Solent, but the LBSCR was persuaded that the undertaking was a worthwhile investment and bought the company in 1886. The service operated at a considerable loss until it ended on 31 March 1888. The gear at St Helens was sold for scrap in 1900.

=== Brading Harbour Company ===
Brading Harbour and Railway Act 1896
- Act of Parliament
- Parliament of the United Kingdom
- Long title: An Act to confer further powers upon the Brading Harbour Improvement and Railway Company and for other purposes.
- Citation: 59 & 60 Vict. c. ccxliii

Dates
- Royal assent: 14 August 1896

Isle of Wight Railway (Brading Harbour and Railway) Act 1898
- Act of Parliament
- Parliament of the United Kingdom
- Long title: An Act for vesting in the Isle of Wight Railway Company the undertaking of the Brading Harbour and Railway Company and for other purposes.
- Citation: 61 & 62 Vict. c. cxcviii

Dates
- Royal assent: 2 August 1898

Text of statute as originally enacted

The BHIR had long been in receivership and as part of a capital reconstruction it changed its name to the Brading Harbour and Railway Company (BHR) by the Brading Harbour and Railway Act 1896 (59 & 60 Vict. c. ccxliii) of 14 August 1896. The railway part of the business was not much affected, but the United Realisation Company, a finance house which now owned the BHR, offered to sell the railway and quays to the IoWR. A price was agreed and the Isle of Wight Railway (Brading Harbour and Railway) Act 1898 (61 & 62 Vict. c. cxcviii) of 2 August 1898 session authorised the transfer.

=== Bembridge branch under the IoWR ===
The IoWR had to expend considerable sums on improving the poor state of its branch line. A steam crane, station improvements, and extensive track modernisation were all on the list of work to be done. Later dredging too was added to the list.

Golf became a popular pastime in the 20th century, and several courses were established adjacent to the branch railway, bringing in significant passenger income.

The Bembridge steamers continued to work during the summer months, but they were never financially successful, and the outbreak of World War I resulted in the end of the service. The pier at Bembridge was condemned and removed in 1928.

== Rail motors ==
In the first years of the twentieth century, railway companies sought for cheaper means of carrying passengers on lightly used lines. One solution was the railmotor, a combined small steam engine and passenger coach. The Isle of Wight Central Railway introduced such a vehicle on 4 October 1906 and it operated into Ryde. The inability to convey additional coaches or goods vehicles was a limitation, and the IoWCR discontinued the use of the vehicle in 1910.

== Electrification proposals ==
From December 1908, a group calling itself the Electric Railways Syndicate pressed the supposed advantages of electrification of the Island's railways. For £1.2 million all the railways of the island were to be purchased and electrified, using an overhead ac system similar to that being installed on the London Brighton and South Coast Railway suburban system. The electrification work itself was to cost about a quarter of the sum. A 4 MW power station would have been provided at Newport. The scheme included a number of line extensions and other improvements which inflated the cost; a frequent passenger service was planned.

The Electric Railways Syndicate did not bring any capital to the scheme; they needed others, including the local authorities, to provide that. No one else saw any advantage for the necessary outlay and in the first half of 1910 the scheme was abandoned.

== World War I ==
During World War I the railways were taken under Government control; the owning companies were to be compensated, but in practice the money failed to address the deterioration of the physical assets. In December 1919 the IoWR reverted to its own control, and it was urgently necessary to modernise; the IoWR did not have much cash available for the purpose, and it was not possible to carry out all that was necessary. The Island continued to enjoy an increase in visitor numbers, and the railway benefited but was unable to cary the traffic with the desired level of efficiency; goods traffic had fallen off during the war and continued to fall afterwards, as road transport proved competitive over the short distances on the island.

== Grouping ==
The Railways Act 1921 directed that the main line railways of Great Britain were to be "grouped" into four large companies; the new Southern Railway was to be created, and the London Brighton and South Coast Railway and the London and South Western Railway were to be constituents of it. The Isle of Wight lines were to be absorbed into it. Negotiations began over the terms so far as the IoWR was concerned; they were led by Sir Herbert Walker, General Manager of the LSWR. The IoWR claimed that it would be able to make significant savings in operating costs in the larger group. However it was obvious that radical economies would be necessary, and the IoWR lacked any reserve fund to pay for renewals. In fact the Isle of Wight Railway, in common with some other small lines, was absorbed by the LSWR on 31 December 1922, immediately before the LSWR was itself taken into the SR on the following day. Finally a settlement was agreed in which shareholders would receive Southern Railway dividends at the same rate as they received from the IoWR in 1921. The Directors were voted £3,600 out of IoWR funds as compensation for loss of office.

The Isle of Wight increased in popularity for holidaymakers and the Portsmouth to Ryde ferry route, owned by the Southern Railway, was the main route to the island. The traffic was highly seasonal; in 1929 two million people used the ferry annually. There were 26 trains per day on the line on the busiest summer days in 1929, and this was increased to three per hour in 1930. By 1936 this was again enhanced to 38 trains running throughout, as well as nine between Ryde and Sandown or Shanklin.

The Southern Railway inherited a disparate fleet of eighteen locomotives and rolling stock from the five companies on the island. Early in 1923 two Adams O2 class 0-4-4T locomotives were sent to Eastleigh Works and fitted with Westinghouse brake, and then sent to the Island for working on the Ryde - Ventnor line, for which they were found very suitable. Two more followed the next year. Many of the island passenger coaches were obsolescent; some did not have electric lighting and none had heating. Over the next years 10 to 12 coaches annually were transferred to the Island from the mainland, having been converted to Westinghouse brake operation. On the Ventnor line former London, Chatham and Dover Railway six-wheel coaches were converted to four-wheelers for easier running on the Island's curved track and made up into close coupled four-coach sets.

The Southern Railway implemented a number of improvements to the line as well; the section between Brading and Shanklin was doubled; (Note: White refers to this on page 151 as the Bembridge to Shanklin section.) this was brought into use on 23 June 1927.

The two single lines of the old IoWR and the IoWCR, ran side by side to Smallbrook, where they diverged. The Southern Railway provided junction points at the point of divergence, which became Smallbrook Junction, and double line working applied from Ryde to that point. In the quieter winter months the signalbox was closed and the signals removed, and the two lines reverted to single line operation. The new junction was commissioned in 1926. It was claimed in 1935 that Smallbrook Junction was the busiest single line junction in the country with 12 trains per hour in summer.

Wroxall station was provided with a second platform and passing loop in 1925.

In the late 1920s passenger carryings in the summer increased strongly, and a 20-minute service was planned for the Ventnor line on summer Saturdays; two more O2 locomotives were brought to the Island as well as a further A1X and several ex-LCDR coaches. With some coach conversions this enabled the discontinuation of the use of non-bogie passenger vehicles on the Island.

It was discovered that some of the piles on Ryde Pier required replacement and the Southern Railway took the opportunity to construct a fourth platform there as part of the work, ready for the 1933 season. Meanwhile, the electric traction system used on the pier tramway was discontinued in 1927, and 2 petrol-driven tram units built by Drewry Car Co. The former electric unit trailers were retained and the trams operated as two-car units. The petrol engines were replaced by diesels in 1959 - 1960.

To allow the O2 locomotives to stay in service throughout the day at busy times, a bigger coal bunker was fitted in 1933, doubling the capacity to three tons.

== From 1948 ==
At the beginning of 1948 the railways of Great Britain passed into nationalised ownership under British Railways. The holiday traffic soon resumed its buoyant volumes after World War II, but the railway carryings were far surpassed by the use of buses (3 million and 17 million respectively in 1951).

Pier and Harbour Order (Bembridge Harbour) Confirmation Act 1963
- Act of Parliament
- Parliament of the United Kingdom
- Long title: An Act to confirm a Provisional Order made by the Minister of Transport under the General Pier and Harbour Act 1861, relating to Bembridge Harbour.
- Citation: 1963 c. xxiii

Dates
- Royal assent: 31 July 1963

Other legislation
- Relates to: General Pier and Harbour Act 1861

Text of statute as originally enacted

The Bembridge branch was lightly patronised and was closed on 21 September 1953. The harbour at Bembridge (Brading Harbour) was of course still extant, and a toll road across the harbour mouth continued to be operated by British Railways. The harbour, by then renamed to Bembridge Harbour, was transferred from British Rail to the Bembridge Harbour Improvements Company by the Pier and Harbour Order (Bembridge Harbour) Confirmation Act 1963 (c. xxiii).

The Isle of Wight Central Railway had taken over the Ryde and Newport Railway and the Isle of Wight (Newport Junction) Railway in 1887, and it too had been absorbed into the Southern Railway in 1923 and now British Railways. On 6 February 1956 the IoWCR line from Sandown to Newport closed.

== The Beeching plan ==
The railways of Great Britain were incurring large and increasing financial losses in the late 1950s and government became concerned about the impact on the economy. In 1963 a report was published, The Reshaping of British Railways, recommending radical changes. The report has become known as The Beeching Report, after the Chairman of British Railways at the time, Dr Richard Beeching.

Many rural branch lines considered to be loss-making were to be closed, in hand with a major reduction in unremunerative wagonload goods traffic and many other changes. In March 1964, BR announced that all of the lines on the Isle of Wight were planned to be closed, but vigorous local protest secured the retention of the Ryde to Shanklin section of the former Isle of Wight Railway, despite controversy that the TUCC inquiry stated that closing the Ryde to Ventnor line would cause severe hardship but British Rail then suddenly proposed curtailing the line at Shanklin, which was accepted by the Minister of Transport, Barbara Castle

The southern extremity, from Shanklin to Ventnor, closed on 18 April 1966. Much of the trackbed survives but it has been severed at the Shanklin end and Ventnor station has become an industrial estate.

The former IoWCR line from Smallbrook Junction to Newport closed on 21 February 1966, although goods trains continued to run as required for a while.

On 17 September 1966 regular steam train operation at Ryde Pier Head ceased, the service being temporarily cut back to Esplanade.

== Electrification ==
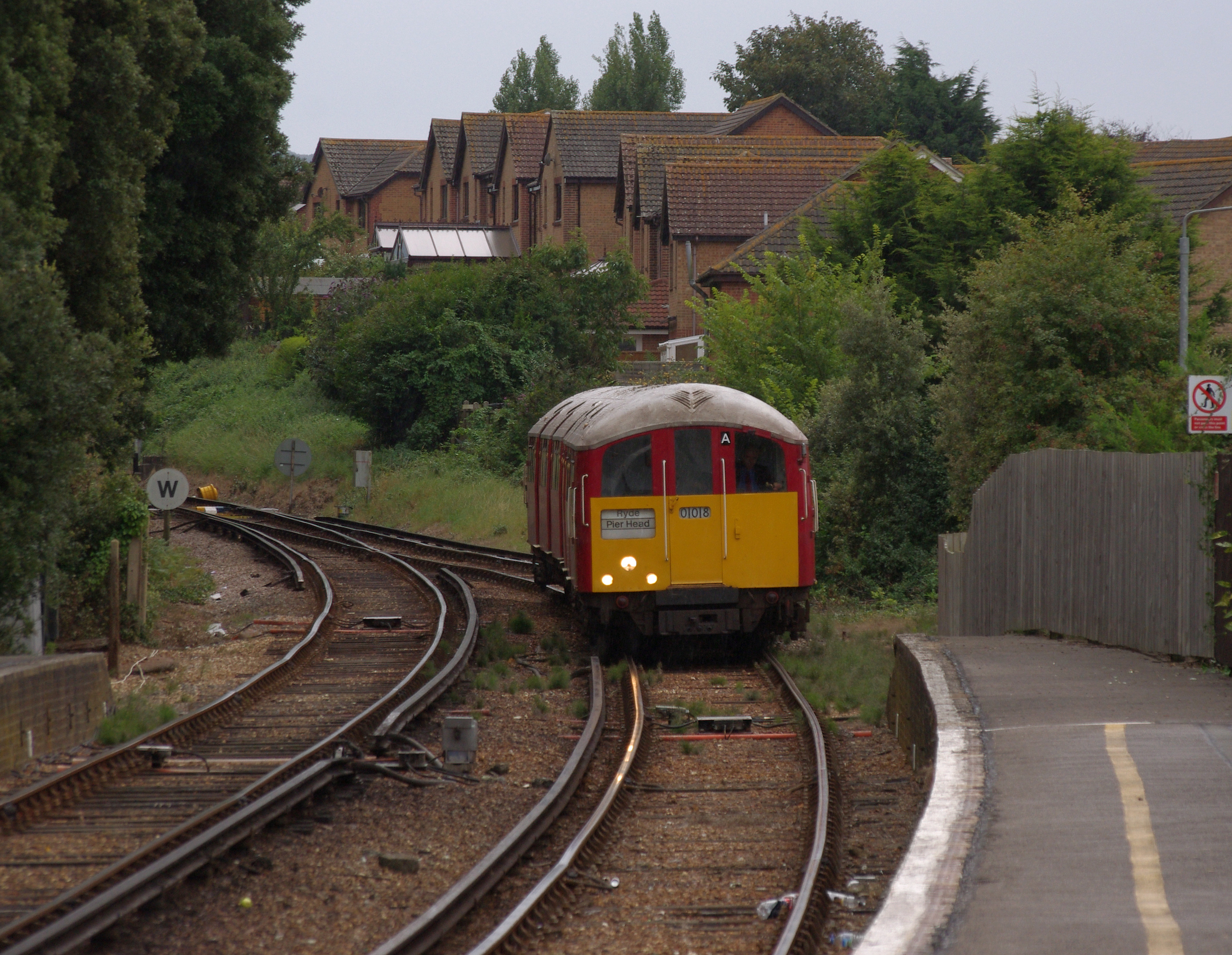
An electric train at Sandown, 2013

Up to this time the island's train services were exclusively steam operated, and thought had been given to how the short residue of the island network would be run. The line was closed between 1 January and 19 March 1967 for completion of third-rail electrification and raising of the track at stations so that platform step heights conformed to the tube stock.

The third rail electrification was at 630V DC, and power was taken from the 33kV public supply through three new 33kV/630V DC substations, located at Ryde St John's, Roxborough, and Sandown. Because of the low headroom in the Ryde tunnel, no British Railways electric train stock was suitable, and 43 second hand tube cars were purchased from London Transport. Goods traffic would not be conveyed. 19 of the UCC and MCCW cars dated from 1927 to 1934, 14 Cammell-Laird cars were from 1927 and 10 MCWF cars were from 1925. All were from the Piccadilly and Northern lines, although some had run on the Northern City Line. They were altered to have running rail traction current return instead of fourth rail. They were made up into four-car sets (Motor – trailer – trailer – motor) and three-car sets (control trailer – trailer – motor).

The basic train service was half-hourly, but the peak service was five trains an hour. This frequency was sufficient to handle the pier tramway system's traffic, and that was discontinued from January 1969.

Mitchell and Smith remark that at Brading, "the 13 elegant swan-neck gas lamps survive in 1985, controlled by automatic time clocks as the station is no longer staffed. We believe that Ilkley is the only other station on BR to have platforms gas lit."

A new station called Lake was opened in 1987.

== Surviving original rolling stock ==
Seven original IoWR carriage bodies have survived: 4w 4-comp second no. 5-8, built 1864, (not completely known) is preserved on the Isle of Wight Steam Railway and is currently inside their exhibition shed, awaiting restoration, 4w 3-comp composite no. 10, built 1864, has returned to operational condition on the Isle of Wight Steam Railway in 2017 as part of Channel 4's 'Great Rail Restorations with Peter Snow', 4w 3-comp first no. 21, built 1864, is awaiting restoration on the Isle of Wight Steam Railway, 4w second no. 35 built in 1875 is awaiting restoration on the Isle of Wight Steam Railway, 4w composite no. 38, built 1882, is awaiting restoration on the Isle of Wight Steam Railway in their exhibition shed and 4w 4-comp second no. 39, built 1882, is also awaiting restoration on the Isle of Wight Steam Railway. These carriages are considered to be of the greatest significance for the IoWSR's collection, along with other carriages that previously ran on the original Isle of Wight Railway.

Three goods vans, nos. 57, 86 and 87 on the Isle of Wight Steam Railway. It is also planned that these will be restored. No. 57 is currently inside the IoWSR's exhibition shed.

Many carriages that also ran on the Isle of Wight Railway that were purchased from previous railways also survive on the Isle of Wight Steam Railway; multiple LCDR & LB&SCR, SECR, one MSJAR, etc. Many of these have been returned to service on PMVY underframes.

The body of one of the Isle of Wight Railway's carriages is in use on the island as of January 2017. It was acquired from the North London Railway in December 1897 although it did not arrive until the following year. It is numbered 6336, and runs on the converted underframe of a parcels van.

== Present day ==
Passenger services on the line between Ryde Pier Head and Shanklin are operated as the Island Line, by South Western Railway.

== Future ==
On 23 May 2020, the Department of Transport announced that approval had been given to investigate the possible reinstatement of some or all of the tracks between Shanklin and Ventnor and Ryde and Newport. It was one of ten schemes across UK approved for more study under an "Ideas Fund".

== Heritage railway ==
In 1991 a new station was opened at Smallbrook Junction. It provides a connection with the Isle of Wight Steam Railway, a heritage railway operating part of the former IoWCR between Smallbrook Junction and Wootton.

== Station list ==
- Ryde Pier Head; LBSCR/LSWR joint line station; opened 12 July 1880;
- Ryde Esplanade; LBSCR/LSWR joint line station; opened 5 April 1880;
- Ryde St Johns Road; opened 23 August 1864;
- Smallbrook Junction; 21 July 1991; exchange platform for Isle of Wight Steam Railway; no road access;
- Brading; opened 23 August 1864;
- Sandown; opened 23 August 1864;
- Lake; opened 11 May 1987;
- Shanklin; opened 23 August 1864;
- Wroxall; opened November 1866; closed 18 April 1966;
- Ventnor; opened 10 September 1866; closed 18 April 1966.
- Bembridge; opened 27 May 1882; closed 21 September 1953;
- St Helens; opened 27 May 1882; closed 21 September 1953;
- Brading; above.

== See also ==
- Railways on the Isle of Wight
- Isle of Wight Rly Co v Tahourdin (1884) LR 25 Ch D 320
