= Maritime archaeology =

Archaeological study of human interaction with the sea

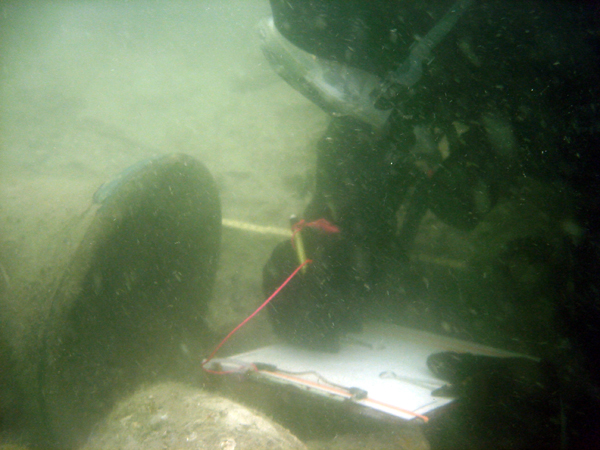
A maritime archaeologist with the Lighthouse Archaeological Maritime Program in St. Augustine, Florida, recording the ship's bell discovered on the 18th century "Storm Wreck."

Maritime archaeology (also known as marine archaeology) is a discipline within archaeology as a whole that specifically studies human interaction with the sea, lakes and rivers through the study of associated physical remains, be they vessels, shore-side facilities, port-related structures, cargoes, human remains and submerged landscapes. A specialty within maritime archaeology is nautical archaeology, which studies ship construction and use.

As with archaeology as a whole, maritime archaeology can be practised within the historical, industrial, or prehistoric periods. An associated discipline, and again one that lies within archaeology itself, is underwater archaeology, which studies the past through any submerged remains be they of maritime interest or not. An example from the prehistoric era would be the remains of submerged settlements or deposits now lying under water despite having been dry land when sea levels were lower. The study of submerged aircraft lost in lakes, rivers or in the sea is an example from the historical, industrial or modern era. Another example are the remains of discovered and potential medieval bridges connecting the islands on the lake with the mainland. Many specialist sub-disciplines within the broader maritime and underwater archaeological categories have emerged in recent years.

Maritime archaeological sites often result from shipwrecks or sometimes seismic activity, and thus represent a moment in time rather than a slow deposition of material accumulated over a period of years, as is the case with port-related structures (such as piers, wharves, docks and jetties) where objects are lost or thrown off structures over extended periods of time. This fact has led to shipwrecks often being described in the media and in popular accounts as 'time capsules'.

Archaeological material in the sea or in other underwater environments is typically subject to different factors than artifacts on land. However, as with terrestrial archaeology, what survives to be investigated by modern archaeologists can often be a tiny fraction of the material originally deposited. A feature of maritime archaeology is that despite all the material that is lost, there are occasional rare examples of substantial survival, from which a great deal can be learned, due to the difficulties often experienced in accessing the sites.

There are those in the archaeology community who see maritime archaeology as a separate discipline with its own concerns (such as shipwrecks) and requiring the specialized skills of the underwater archaeologist. Others value an integrated approach, stressing that nautical activity has economic and social links to communities on land and that archaeology is archaeology no matter where the study is conducted. All that is required is the mastering of skills specific to the environment in which the work occurs.

== Integrating land and sea ==
Before the industrial era, travel by water was often easier than over land. As a result, marine channels, navigable rivers and sea crossings formed the trade routes of historic and ancient civilisations. For example, the Mediterranean Sea was known to the Romans as the inner sea because the Roman Empire spread around its coasts.

The historic record as well as the remains of harbours, ships and cargoes, testify to the volume of trade that crossed it. Later, nations with a strong maritime culture such as the United Kingdom, the Netherlands, Denmark, Portugal and Spain were able to establish colonies on other continents. Wars were fought at sea over the control of important resources.

The material cultural remains that are discovered by maritime archaeologists along former trade routes can be combined with historical documents and material cultural remains found on land to understand the economic, social and political environment of the past. Of late maritime archaeologists have been examining the submerged cultural remains of China, India, Korea and other Asian nations.

== Preservation of material underwater ==
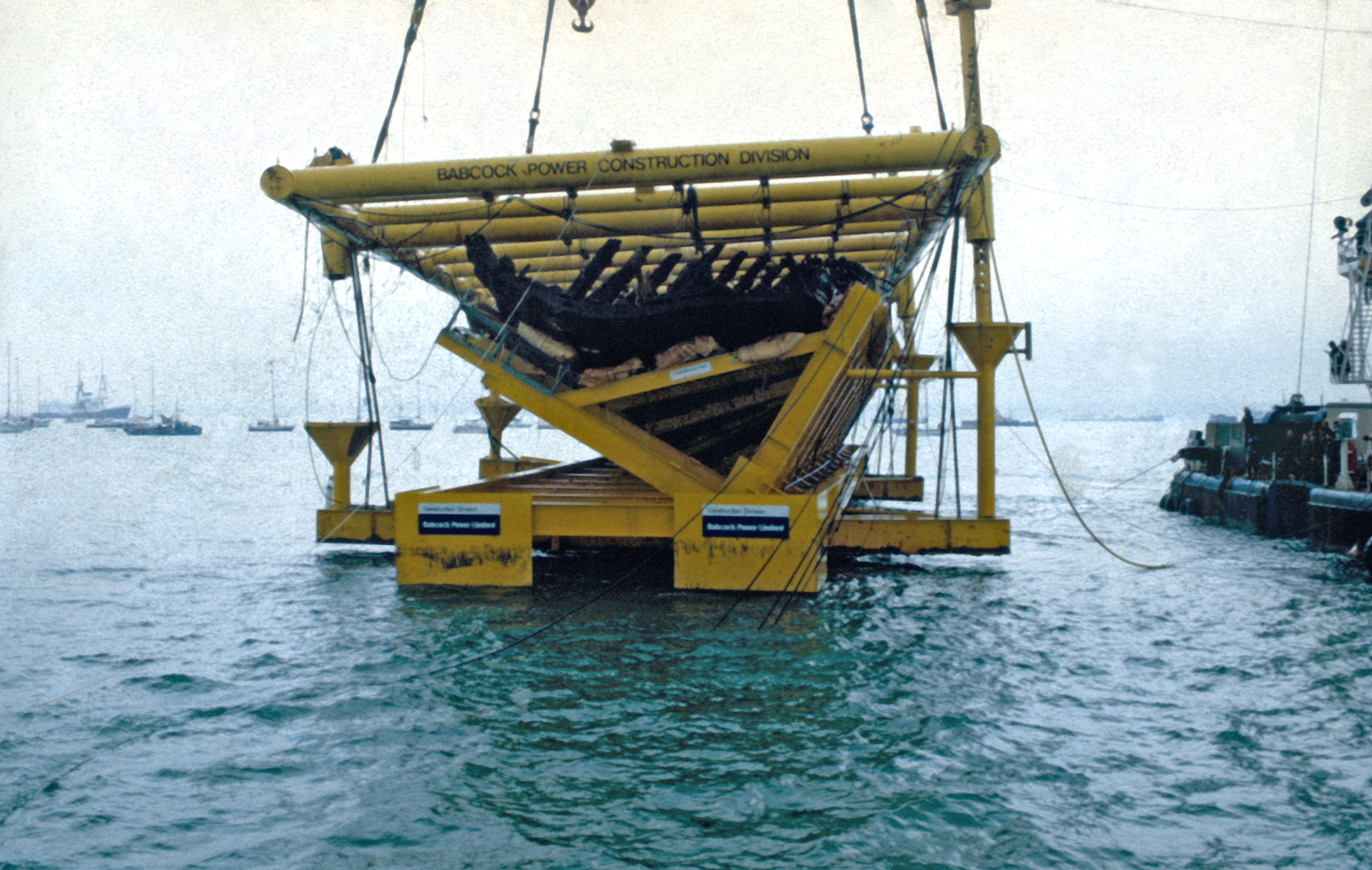
The final phases of the salvage of Mary Rose on October 11, 1982.

There are significant differences in the survival of archaeological material depending on whether a site is wet or dry, on the nature of the chemical environment, on the presence of biological organisms and on the dynamic forces present. Thus rocky coastlines, especially in shallow water, are typically inimical to the survival of artifacts, which can be dispersed, smashed or ground by the effect of currents and surf, possibly (but not always) leaving an artifact pattern but little if any wreck structure.

Saltwater is particularly inimical to iron artefacts including metal shipwrecks, and sea organisms will readily consume organic material such as wooden shipwrecks. On the other hand, out of all the thousands of potential archaeological sites destroyed or grossly eroded by such natural processes, occasionally sites survive with exceptional preservation of a related collection of artifacts. An example of such a collection is Mary Rose. Survival in this instance is largely due to the remains being buried in sediment.

Of the many examples where the sea bed provides an extremely hostile environment for submerged evidence of history, one of the most notable, RMS Titanic, though a relatively young wreck and in deep water so calcium-starved that concretion does not occur, appears strong and relatively intact, though indications are that it has already incurred irreversible degradation of her steel and iron hull. As such degradation inevitably continues, data will be forever lost, objects' context will be destroyed and the bulk of the wreck will over centuries completely deteriorate on the floor of the Atlantic Ocean. Comparative evidence shows that all iron and steel ships, especially those in a highly oxygenated environment, continue to degrade and will continue to do so until only their engines and other machinery project much above the sea-floor. Where it remains even after the passage of time, the iron or steel hull is often fragile with no remaining metal within the layer of concretion and corrosion products. USS Monitor, having been found in the 1970s, was subjected to a program of attempted in situ preservation, for example, but deterioration of the vessel progressed at such a rate that the rescue of her turret was undertaken lest nothing be saved from the wreck.

Some wrecks, lost to natural obstacles to navigation, are at risk of being smashed by subsequent wrecks sunk by the same hazard, or are deliberately destroyed because they present a hazard to navigation. Even in deep water, commercial activities such as pipe-laying operations and deep sea trawling can place a wreck at risk. Such a wreck is the Mardi Gras shipwreck sunk in the Gulf of Mexico in 4,000 feet (1,200 m) of water. The shipwreck lay forgotten at the bottom of the sea until it was discovered in 2002 by an oilfield inspection crew working for the Okeanos Gas Gathering Company (OGGC). Large pipelines can crush sites and render some of their remnants inaccessible as pipe is dropped from the ocean surface to the substrate thousands of feet below. Trawl nets snag and tear superstructures and separate artifacts from their context.

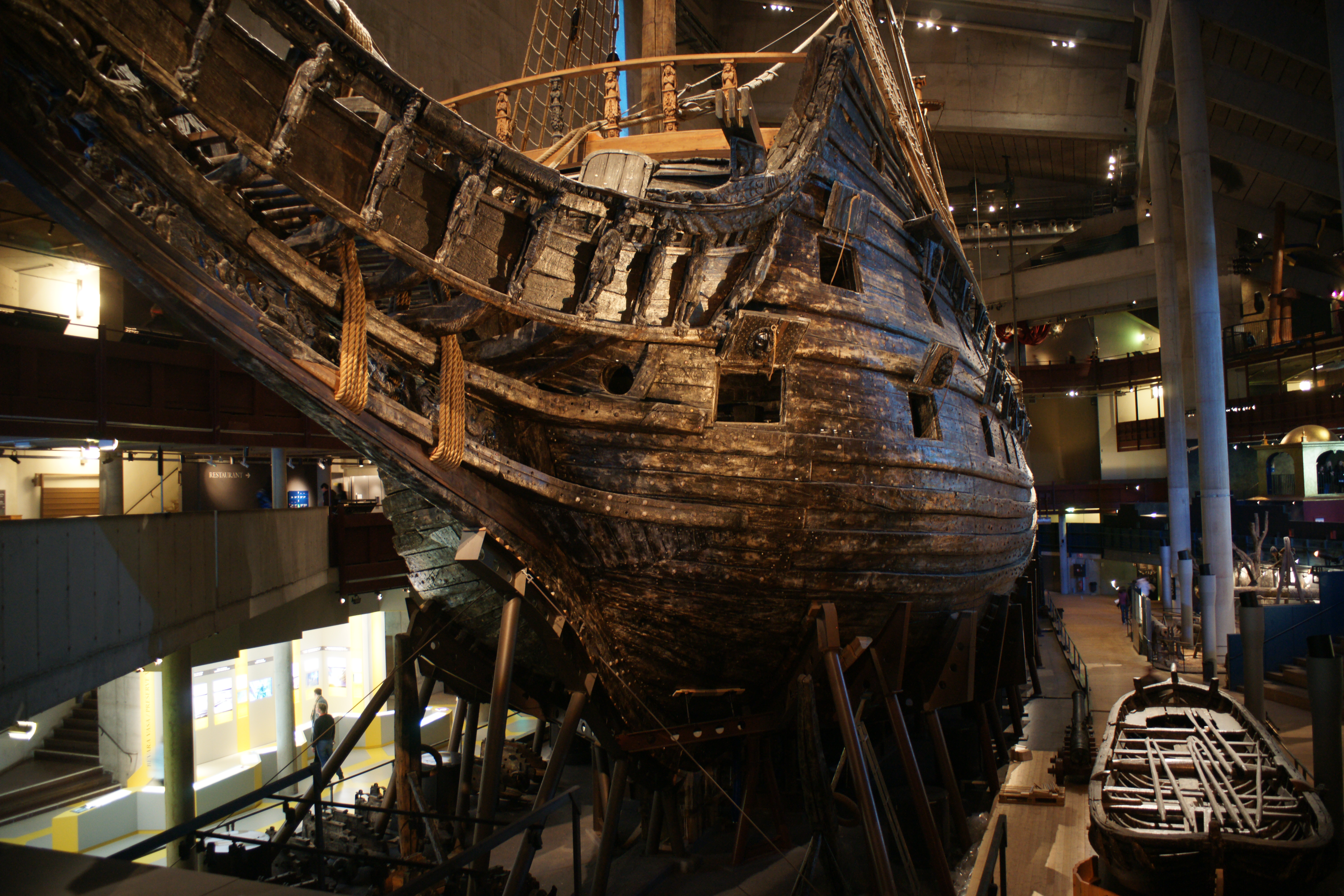
The bow of Vasa, a Swedish warship that foundered and sank on its maiden voyage in 1628. It was salvaged in 1961 and is now on permanent display at the Vasa Museum in Stockholm.

The wrecks, and other archaeological sites that have been preserved have generally survived because the dynamic nature of the sea bed can result in artifacts becoming rapidly buried in sediments. These sediments then provide an anaerobic environment which protects from further degradation. Wet environments, whether on land in the form of peat bogs and wells, or underwater are particularly important for the survival of organic material, such as wood, leather, fabric and horn. Cold and absence of light also aid survival of artifacts, because there is little energy available for either organic activity or chemical reactions. Salt water provides for greater organic activity than freshwater, and in particular, the shipworm, Teredo navalis, lives only in salt water, so some of the best preservation in the absence of sediments has been found in the cold, dark waters of the Great Lakes in North America and in the (low salinity) Baltic Sea (where Vasa was preserved).

While the land surface is continuously reused by societies, the sea bed was largely inaccessible until the advent of submarines, scuba equipment and remotely operated underwater vehicles (ROVs) in the twentieth century. Salvagers have operated in much earlier times, but much of the material was beyond the reach of anyone. Thus Mary Rose was subject to salvage from the sixteenth century and later, but a very large amount of material, buried in the sediments, remained to be found by maritime archaeologists of the twentieth century.

While preservation in situ is not assured, material that has survived underwater and is then recovered to land is typically in an unstable state and can only be preserved using highly specialised conservation processes. While the wooden structure of Mary Rose and the individual artifacts have been undergoing conservation since their recovery, Holland 1 provides an example of a relatively recent (metal) wreck for which extensive conservation has been necessary to preserve the hull. While the hull remains intact, its machinery remains inoperable. The engine of SS Xantho that was recovered in 1985 from a saline environment after over a century underwater is presently considered somewhat anomalous, in that after two decades of treatment it can now be turned over by hand.

A challenge for the modern archaeologist is to consider whether in-situ preservation, or recovery and conservation on land is the preferable option; or to face the fact that preservation in any form, other than as an archaeological record is not feasible. A site that has been discovered has typically been subjected to disturbance of the very factors that caused its survival in the first place, for example, when a covering of sediment has been removed by storms or the action of man. Active monitoring and deliberate protection may mitigate further rapid destruction making in situ preservation an option, but long-term survival can never be guaranteed. For very many sites, the costs are too great for either active measures to ensure in situ preservation or to provide for satisfactory conservation on recovery. Even the cost of proper and complete archaeological investigation may be too great to enable this to occur within a timescale that ensures that an archaeological record is made before data is inevitably lost.

== Submerged sites ==
=== Prehistoric landscapes ===
Maritime archaeology studies prehistorical objects and sites that are, because of changes in climate and geology, now underwater.

Bodies of water, fresh and saline, have been important sources of food for people for as long as we have existed. It should be no surprise that ancient villages were located at the water's edge. Since the last ice age sea level has risen as much as 400 feet (120 m).

Therefore, a great deal of the record of human activity throughout the Ice Age is now to be found under water.

The flooding of the area now known as the Black Sea (when a land bridge, where the Bosporus is now, collapsed under the pressure of rising water in the Mediterranean Sea) submerged a great deal of human activity that had been gathered round what had been an enormous, fresh-water lake.

Significant cave art sites off the coast of western Europe such as the Grotto Cosquer can be reached only by diving, because the cave entrances are underwater, though the upper portions of the caves themselves are not flooded.

=== Historic sites ===
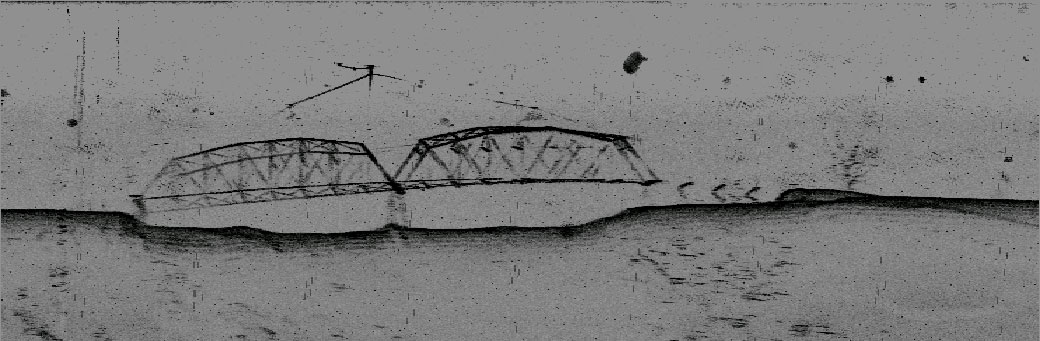
Submerged bridge under Lake Murray, South Carolina in 160 ft (49 m) of fresh water seen on side-scan sonar imagery using a Humminbird 981c Side Imaging system.

Throughout history, seismic events have at times caused submergence of human settlements. The remains of such catastrophes exist all over the world, and sites such as Alexandria, Port Royal and Mary Rose now form important archaeological sites that are being protected, managed and conserved. As with shipwrecks, archaeological research can follow multiple themes, including evidence of the final catastrophe, the structures and landscape before the catastrophe and the culture and economy of which it formed a part. Unlike the wrecking of a ship, the destruction of a town by a seismic event can take place over many years and there may be evidence for several phases of damage, sometimes with rebuilding in between.

== Archaeological diving ==
Archaeological diving is a type of scientific diving used as a method of survey and excavation in underwater archaeology. The first known use of the method comes from 1446, when Leon Battista Alberti explored and attempted to lift the ships of Emperor Caligula in Lake Nemi, Italy. Just a few decades later, in 1535, the same site saw the first use of a sophisticated breathing apparatus for archaeological purposes, when Guglielmo de Lorena and Frances de Marchi used an early diving bell to explore and retrieve material from the lake, although they decided to keep the blueprint of the exact mechanism secret. The following three centuries saw the gradual extension of diving time through the use of bells and submersing barrels filled with air. In the 19th century, the standard copper helmet diving gear was developed, allowing divers to stay underwater for extended periods through a constant air supply pumped down from the surface through a hose.

Nevertheless, the widespread utilisation of diving gear for archaeological purposes had to wait until the 20th century, when archaeologists began to appreciate the wealth of material that could be found under the water. This century also saw further advances in technology, most important being the invention of the aqualung by Émile Gagnan and Jacques-Yves Cousteau, the latter of whom would go on to use the technology for underwater excavation by 1948. Modern archaeologists use two kinds of equipment to provide breathing gas underwater: self-contained underwater breathing apparatus (SCUBA), which allows for greater mobility but limits the time the diver can spend in the water, and Surface-supplied diving equipment (SSDE or SSBA), which is safer but more expensive, and airline, or hookah equipment, a basic form of surface supplied equipment with limited depth applications. Both open circuit and rebreather scuba have been used, depending on which is best suited to the site.

=== Equipment and procedures ===
- Position fixing of the site datum. Various methods were used historically, but DGPS is relatively accurate and available.
- Site survey and mapping, and recording of artifact positioning relative to a datum. This may be done manually or with the aid of high resolution multibeam sonar and photogrammetry
- Excavation:
  - Manual excavation.
  - Use of airlift dredges
  - Hydraulic powered suction dredges to remove silt lifted by fanning, to be deposited downcurrent.
  - Silt and sand blowers can be useful if the current removes the lifted material before it settles, but must be used with discretion as artifacts may be entrained in the flow if it is too strong.
- Recording
- Artifact recovery and conservation.

Relatively recent developments, mainly for special circumstances:

- First person point of view video recordings by each diver keep continuous record of work done.
- Daily photogrammetry to record state of site in detail, stratigraphy, and for dive planning.
- 360° cameras.
- Diving rebreathers.
- Saturation diving,
- Atmospheric diving suits

=== Depth of sites ===
The depth of sites can vary within the range of ocean depth, but most sites that are accessible to diving work are relatively shallow.

The wreck of a Phoenician ship off the coast of Malta at a depth of about 110 metres (360 ft) has been partially excavated by divers using rebreather equipment, using techniques developed for the purpose to make the most effective use of time on site, which was restricted to 3 shifts of 12 minute each per day on site. The site of the wreck of the USS Monitor is near Cape Hatteras at 230 feet (70 m) depth at coordinates 35°0′6″N 75°24′23″W. When it was realised that recovering the whole vessel was not economically viable, work was done by saturation divers to recover the propeller, engine and turret. The Exosuit, a relatively lightweight Atmospheric Diving System for marine research was first used in 2014 at the Antikythera underwater archaeology expeditions. Exosuit is like a space suit that is depth-rated for use in depths up to 1000 feet of sea water, and is tethered to the surface by an umbilical.

== Coastal and foreshore ==
Not all maritime sites are underwater. There are many structures at the margin of land and water that provide evidence of the human societies of the past. Some are deliberately created for access - such as bridges and walkways. Other structures remain from exploitation of resources, such as dams and fish traps. Nautical remains include early harbours and places where ships were built or repaired. At the end of their life, ships were often beached. Valuable or easily accessed timber has often been salvaged, leaving just a few frames and bottom planking.

Archaeological sites can also be found on the foreshore today that would have been on dry land when they were constructed. An example of such a site is Seahenge, a Bronze Age timber circle.

== Ships and shipwrecks ==
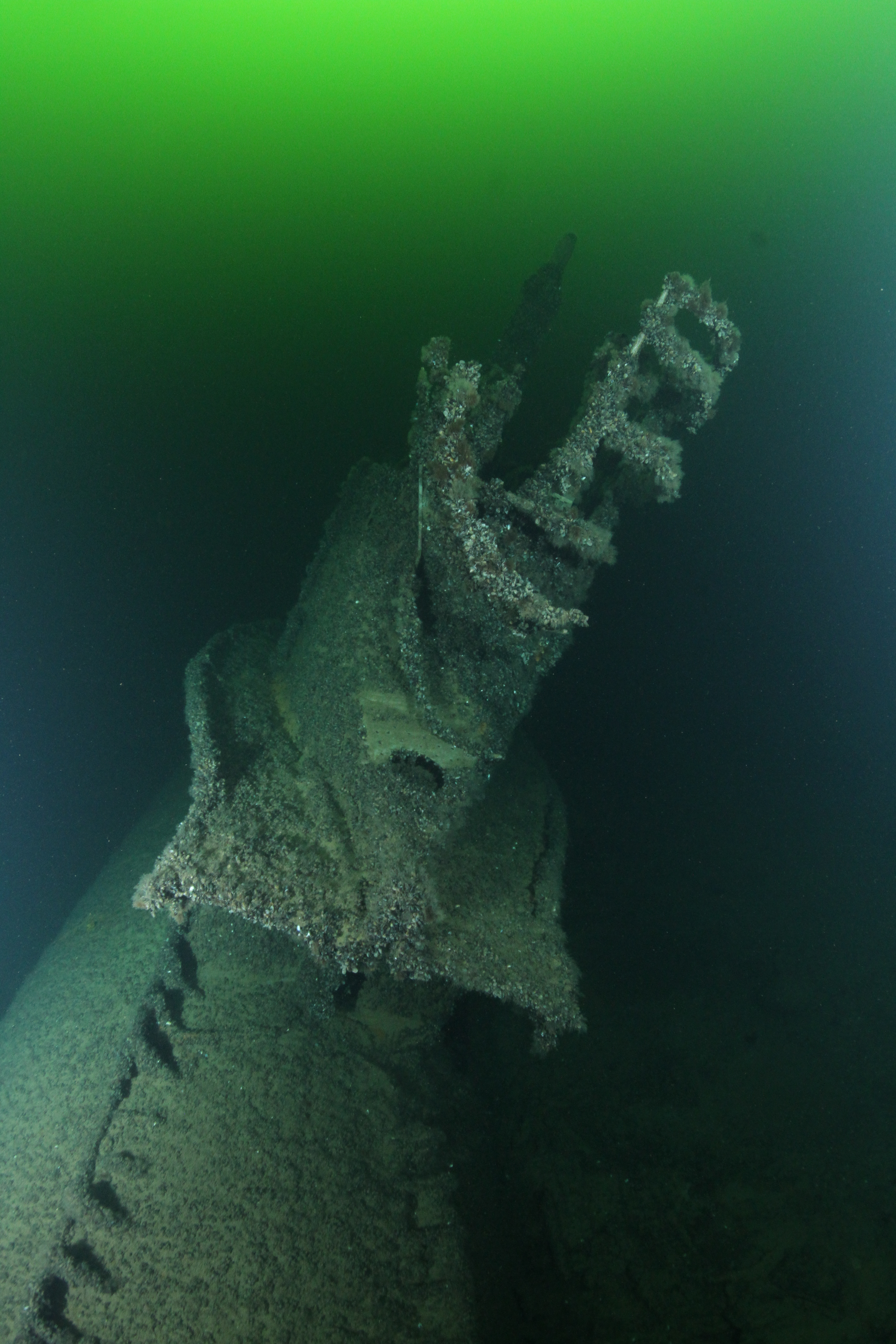
Wreck of Russian submarine Akula was found in 2014 near Hiiumaa, Estonia.

The archaeology of shipwrecks can be divided into a three-tier hierarchy, of which the first tier considers the wrecking process itself: how does a ship break up, how does a ship sink to the bottom, and how do the remains of the ship, cargo and the surrounding environment evolve over time? The second tier studies the ship as a machine, both in itself and in a military or economic system. The third tier consists of the archaeology of maritime cultures, in which nautical technology, naval warfare, trade and shipboard societies are studied. Some consider this to be the most important tier. Ships and boats are not necessarily wrecked: some are deliberately abandoned, scuttled or beached. Many such abandoned vessels have been extensively salvaged.

=== Bronze Age ===
The earliest boats discovered date from the Bronze Age and are constructed of hollowed out logs or sewn planks. Vessels have been discovered where they have been preserved in sediments underwater or in waterlogged land sites, such as the discovery of a canoe near St Botolphs. Examples of sewn-plank boats include those found at North Ferriby and the Dover Bronze Age Boat which is now displayed at Dover Museum. These may be an evolution from boats made of sewn hides, but it is highly unlikely that hide boats could have survived.

Ships wrecked in the sea have probably not survived, although remains of cargo (particularly bronze material) have been discovered, such as those at the Salcombe B site. A close collection of artefacts on the sea bed may imply that artefacts were from a ship, even if there are no remains of the actual vessel.

Late Bronze Age ships, such as the Uluburun Shipwreck have been discovered in the Mediterranean, constructed of edge joined planks. This shipbuilding technology continued through the classical period. The 2023 announcement of the Orca Shipwreck is considered the earliest deep-sea shipwreck to be discovered.

== Maritime archaeology by region ==
=== Pacific ===
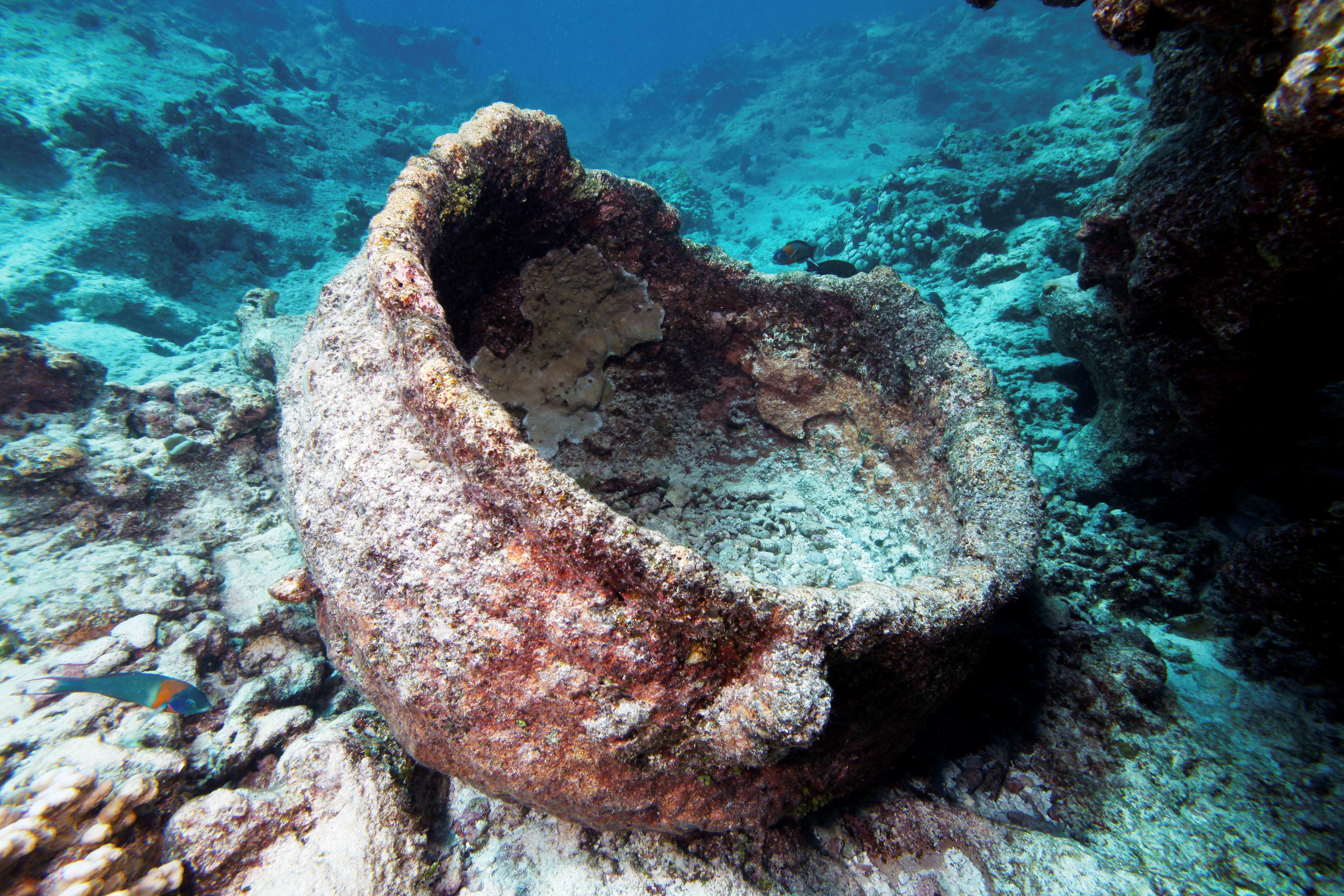
Try pot from a 19th-century whaling ship that wrecked on French Frigate Shoals (Pacific Ocean)

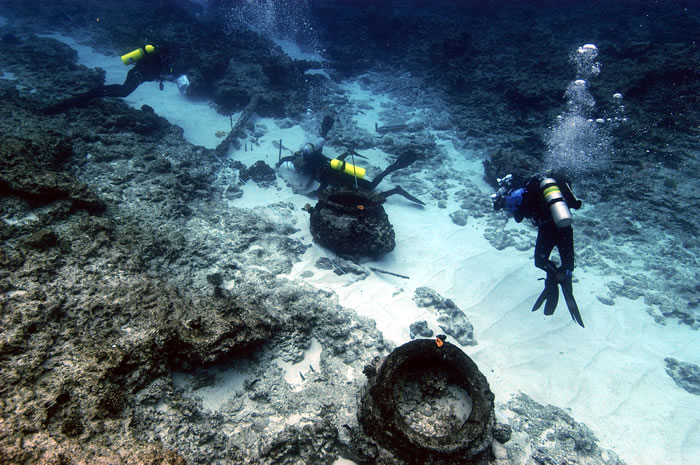
Divers explored a wreck site at Pearl and Hermes atoll

An example of maritime archaeology in the Pacific Ocean is the discovery of the wreck of Two Brothers, discovered in 2008 by a team of marine archaeologists working on an expedition for the National Oceanic and Atmospheric Administration (NOAA). The identity of the ship was not immediately known so it was called the "Shark Island Whaler"; the ship's identification as Two Brothers was announced by NOAA on February 11, 2011, the 188th anniversary of her sinking. The wreck is the first discovery of a wrecked Nantucket whaling ship.

Nine historic trade ships carrying ceramics dating back to the 10th century until the 19th century were excavated under Swedish engineer Sten Sjöstrand in the South China Sea.

- Royal Nanhai (circa 1460), found in 1995
- Nanyang (circa 1380), found in 1995
- Xuande (circa 1540), found in 1995
- Longquan (circa 1400), found in 1996
- Turiang (circa 1370), found in 1996
- Singtai (circa 1550), found in 1998
- Desaru (circa 1830), found in 2001
- Tanjong Simpang (AD 960- 1127), found in 2001
- Wanli (early 17th century), found in 2003

=== Mediterranean area ===
In the Mediterranean area, maritime archaeologists have investigated several ancient cultures. Notable early Iron Age shipwrecks include two Phoenician ships of c. 750 BC that foundered off Gaza with cargoes of wine in amphoras. The crew of the U.S. Navy deep submergence research submarine NR-1 discovered the sites in 1997. In 1999 a team led by Robert Ballard and Harvard University archaeology Professor Lawrence Stager investigated the wrecks.

Extensive research has been carried out on the Mediterranean and Aegean coastlines of Turkey. Complete excavations have been performed on several wrecks from the Classical, Hellenistic, Byzantine, and Ottoman periods.

Maritime archaeological studies in Italy illuminate the naval and maritime activities of the Etruscans, Greek colonists, and Romans. After the 2nd century BC, the Roman fleet ruled the Mediterranean and actively suppressed piracy. During this Pax Romana, seaborne trade increased significantly throughout the region. Though sailing was the safest, fastest, and most efficient method of transportation in the ancient world, some fractional percentage of voyages ended in shipwreck. With the significantly increased sea traffic during the Roman era came a corresponding increase in shipwrecks. These wrecks and their cargo remains offer glimpses through time of the economy, culture, and politics of the ancient world. Particularly useful to archaeologists are studies of amphoras, the ceramic shipping containers used in the Mediterranean region from the 15th century BC through the Medieval period.

In addition to many discoveries in the sea, some wrecks have been examined in lakes. Most notable are Caligula's pleasure barges in Lake Nemi, Italy. The Nemi ships and other shipwreck sites occasionally yield objects of unique artistic value. For instance, the Antikythera wreck contained a staggering collection of marble and bronze statues including the Antikythera Youth. Discovered in 1900 by Greek sponge divers, the ship probably sank in the 1st century BC and may have been dispatched by the Roman general, Sulla, to carry booty back to Rome. The sponge divers also recovered from the wreck the famous Antikythera mechanism, believed to be an astronomical calculator. Further examples of fabulous works of art recovered from the sea floor are the two "bronzi" found in Riace (Calabria), Italy. In the cases of Antikythera and Riace, however, the artifacts were recovered without the direct participation of maritime archaeologists.

Recent studies in the Sarno river (near Pompeii) show other interesting elements of ancient life. The Sarno projects suggests that on the Tyrrhenian shore there were little towns with palafittes, similar to ancient Venice. In the same area, the submerged town of Puteoli (Pozzuoli, close to Naples) contains the "portus Julius" created by Marcus Vipsanius Agrippa in 37 BC, later sunk due to bradyseism.

The sea floor elsewhere in the Mediterranean holds countless archaeological sites. In Israel, Herod the Great's port at Caesarea Maritima has been extensively studied. Other finds are consistent with some passages of the Bible (like the so-called Jesus boat, which appears to have been in use during the first century AD).

=== Australia ===
Maritime archaeology in Australia commenced in the 1970s with the advent of Jeremy Green due to concerns expressed by academics and politicians with the rampant destruction of the Dutch and British East India ships lost on the west coast. As Commonwealth legislation was enacted and enforced after 1976 and as States enacted their own legislation the sub-discipline spread throughout Australia concentrating initially on shipwrecks due to on-going funding by both the States and the Commonwealth under their shipwreck legislation. Studies now include as an element of underwater archaeology, as a whole, the study of submerged indigenous sites. Nautical Archaeology, (the specialised study of boat and ship construction) is also practised in the region. Often the sites or relics studied in Australia as in the rest of the world are not inundated. The study of historic submerged aircraft, better known as a sub-discipline of aviation archaeology, underwater aviation archaeology is also practised in the region. In some states maritime and underwater archaeology is practised out of Museums and in others out of cultural heritage management units, and all practitioners operate under the aegis of the Australasian Institute for Maritime Archaeology (AIMA).

== See also ==
- Australasian Underwater Cultural Heritage Database
- Maritime archaeology of East Africa
- Nautical Archaeology Society
- Maritime Archaeology Trust
- Lighthouse Archaeological Maritime Program (LAMP)
- RPM Nautical Foundation
- Sea Research Society
- Institute of Nautical Archaeology
- UNESCO Convention on the Protection of the Underwater Cultural Heritage
- Blue Heritage Project

=== Submerged historic and pre-historic sites ===
- Bouldnor Cliff
- Alexandria
- Port Royal
- Maritime Heritage Trail - Battle of Saipan
- Interactive 3D model of an ancient Roman shipwreck found in Croatia

=== Coastal and foreshore archaeology ===
- Seahenge

=== Ships and boats ===
- Antikythera c 80-50 BC, includes the astronomical computer, the Antikythera mechanism
- Cape Gelidonya – Late Bronze Age shipwreck, c. 1200 BC
- City of Adelaide (1864) – 19th century clipper, Scotland
- North Ferriby – site of discovery of Bronze Age sewn plank boats dated by radiocarbon to between 1890 BC to 1700 BC
- Belle shipwreck – French explorer La Salle's ship, lost in 1686 off Texas
- Batavia shipwreck – Dutch East Indies ship, lost in 1629 off Western Australia
- Hunley – the first submarine to sink an enemy ship, lost off Charleston, South Carolina, in 1864
- Half Moon (shipwreck) – A racing sailboat which sank in 1930 near Miami, Florida, United States - and one of the sites in the Florida Maritime Heritage Trail
- Ma'agan Michael Ship – A 5th century BC boat discovered off the coast of Israel
- Madrague de Giens c 75-60 BC, Roman merchantman sunk of the coast of La Madrague de Giens, east of Toulon
- Nineteenth century boat discovered at Leamington Wharf, Union Canal
- SS Xantho – Iron-hulled steamship, lost in 1872 off Western Australia. Its historic engine was raised in 1985 and can now be turned over by hand
- Uluburun – Late Bronze Age shipwreck, 14th century BC
- Condura Croatica – 11th century, port of Nin, Croatia
- Queen Anne's Revenge – Blackbeard's flagship, 18th century frigate, Beaufort, NC.
