= Archaeology Discover Centre =

Museum in Fort Victoria, Isle of Wight, England

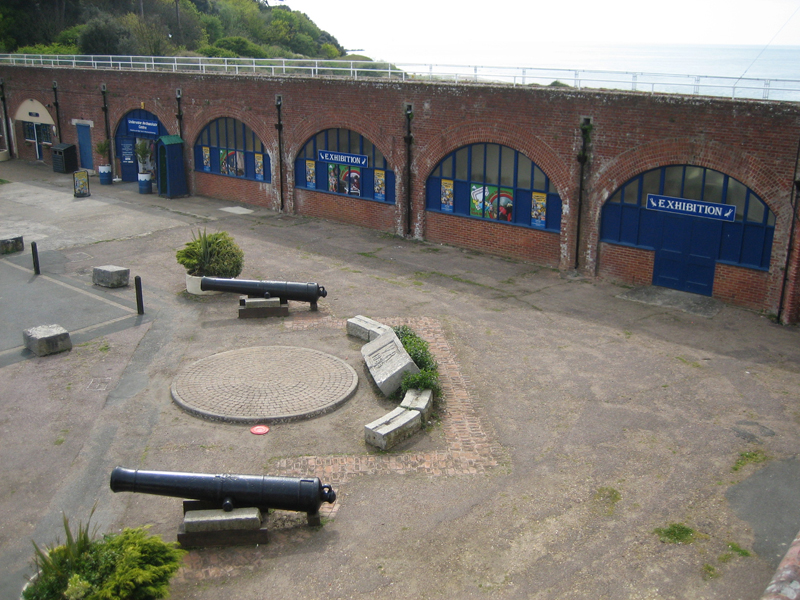
- The museum in the casemates of Fort Victoria.

- Location of The Museum within the Isle of Wight
- Established: 1990
- Location: Fort Victoria, Isle of Wight, England
- Coordinates: 50.706667°N 1.521111°W
- Type: Archaeology
- Curator: Katie Cambridge
- Public transit access: Yarmouth
- Website: Sunken Secrets

The Archaeology Discover Centre (formerly Sunken Secrets and the Underwater Archaeology Centre) was a museum located in Fort Victoria on the Isle of Wight, England.

The museum was run by archaeologists based on the Isle of Wight. It was housed in five of the fort's former casemates. Since it was opened in 1990 the museum was used to display exhibits recovered from several local shipwrecks and the submerged landscapes of the Solent. These include the wrecks of HMS Pomone, HMS Invincible, the Yarmouth Roads Wreck and Bouldnor Cliff. The museum also houses an exhibition about the history of Fort Victoria itself.

== History ==
After the wreck of HMS Pomone was discovered at The Needles in 1969, the Isle of Wight Council funded a team to research and excavate the site. In 1984 another wreck was discovered immediately offshore of Yarmouth and work began excavating that site as well. In 1990 the Isle of Wight Trust for Maritime Archaeology was founded and began operating a museum at Fort Victoria called the Maritime Heritage Exhibition. Several finds from the excavations were displayed in the museum, whilst others went to the Royal Naval Museum in Portsmouth and Bembridge Maritime Museum.

In 1991 the Trust expanded into the Hampshire and Wight Trust for Maritime Archaeology, a charity which went on to investigate more maritime archaeology in the local area and discovered the site of Bouldnor Cliff in 1999. The Trust refurbished the museum which was re-opened in 2006 as the Underwater Archaeology Centre. In 2013 it was renamed Sunken Secrets. In 2017 the ownership of the centre passed into local hands.

== Exhibits ==
Shipwrecks: The shipwrecks exhibition explores why there are so many wrecks in the Solent area, why wrecks are seen as acting as time capsules of the past, and displays finds from Trust excavations. It includes the stories of HMS Pomone, HMS Invincible, the Yarmouth Roads Wreck (believed to be the Spanish Galleon Santa Lucia), and other wrecks at the Needles and Alum Bay.

Submerged landscapes: The submerged landscapes exhibits explain the history of the Solent as a dry river valley before rising sea levels flooded it and created the strait that exists today. It focuses on the Trust's excavations at Bouldnor Cliff and includes artefacts recovered from the sea bed.

== Closure ==
The Sunken Secrets/Archaeology Discovery Centre exhibition closed permanently in 2019. Artefacts on display have been relocated to the Maritime Trust's Shipwrecks exhibition at Arreton Barns, on the Isle of Wight. The building that housed the exhibition at Fort Victoria has been converted into a combination of gift shops and exhibition space.

== See also ==
- Maritime archaeology
- Underwater archaeology
- Shipwrecks

== Bibliography ==
- David Burdett & Allan Insole (1995). Discovering an Island - The roadside heritage of the Isle of Wight. The Isle of Wight Society/Island Books. ISBN 1-898198-12-8.
- Medland, J (2007). The Making of the Wight - An illustrated history of the Isle of Wight. The Isle of Wight Beacon Ltd. ISBN 978-1-904149-14-9.
