= Maritime Archaeology Trust =

Charitable organization in Great Britain

The Maritime Archaeology Trust
- Formation: 1991
- Legal status: Charitable Trust
- Purpose: Promote maritime archaeological study
- Headquarters: National Oceanography Centre
- Location: United Kingdom
- Region served: Primarily the Solent
- Website: maritimearchaeologytrust.org
- Remarks: Registered charity number 900025

The Maritime Archaeology Trust (formerly the Hampshire and Wight Trust for Maritime Archaeology) is a charitable trust that researches and excavates maritime archaeology and heritage in Great Britain. Historically, their core activities were focused around Hampshire, the Isle of Wight and the Solent, but now they work in other parts of the country and on international projects.

== History ==
The discovery of the wreck of HMS Pomone at The Needles in 1969 led the Isle of Wight Council to fund and organise a team to research and excavate the site. As more wrecks were discovered in the following decades, the Isle of Wight Maritime Heritage Project was formed. The project originally focused on the Yarmouth Roads Protected Wreck Site but also began to identify Mesolithic sites on the seabed of the Solent. When central government funds were withdrawn, the project was re-organised as the Isle of Wight Trust for Maritime Archaeology in 1990. The Trust managed the excavation of several sites and became the licensee for many of them. In 1991, with support from Hampshire County Council, the Trust's scope expanded and it became the Hampshire and Wight Trust for Maritime Archaeology. In 2013, it became the Maritime Archaeology Trust.

== Projects ==
The charity has since investigated a great deal of maritime archaeology around the Solent, including shipwrecks, submerged landscapes and inter-tidal foreshore sites. They have also conducted projects as far away as Gibraltar and the Farasan Islands.

=== Bouldnor Cliff ===
In 1999 divers from the Trust discovered the Mesolithic settlement site of Bouldnor Cliff. The site is offshore of Bouldnor on the Isle of Wight and about 11 metres below the surface of the Solent. Attention was first drawn to the site when divers observed a lobster discarding worked flint tools from its burrow. Since then, regular fieldwork has revealed that Bouldnor was almost certainly a settlement site approximately 8,000 years ago (6,000 BC), at a time when lower sea levels meant that the Solent was an extensive river valley. Work done so far has revealed that the technology of Mesolithic settlers was probably 2,000 years ahead of what had previously been believed.

=== Forton Lake ===
Between 2006 and 2009, the Trust ran a joint community archaeology project at Forton Lake, with the Nautical Archaeology Society, cataloguing the wide range of hulks there. The project was designed to raise local awareness and foster a sense of local pride and ownership amongst nearby residents in Gosport.

=== Centaur Tanks ===
In a joint project with Southsea Sub Aqua Club, the Trust has investigated two Centaur tanks from a capsized Landing Craft Tank in the Solent, as part of a case study to see if land based legislation can be used to protect maritime archaeology.

=== The Mystery Wreck ===
The Trust investigated a 'mystery wreck' on Horse Tail Sands in the Solent between 2003 and 2011. It was not until 2011 that the Trust was able to confirm the vessel's identity as the Flower of Ugie, a 19th-century barque. As well as fully recording the vessel's remains, the Trust replicated the process of wreck research and identification in a teaching pack for children.

== Dissemination and education ==
The Trust runs an active outreach and schools programme and operates a "Maritime Bus" to make maritime archaeology more accessible to the general public. The bus attends regular events in the south coast, including school, community and other public events. The Trust also runs the Sunken Secrets exhibition at Fort Victoria on the Isle of Wight.

In 2011, the Trust was awarded a Europa Nostra award for Category 4: Education, Training and Awareness Raising, for "raising the profile of maritime heritage and archaeology", recognising the numerous ways in which the Trust teaches audiences of all types about maritime heritage.

== Maritime Archaeology Limited ==
In 2004, the Trust formed Maritime Archaeology Ltd as a commercial trading arm in order to provide archaeological contractual services.

== Bibliography ==
- David Burdett & Allan Insole (1995). Discovering an Island – The roadside heritage of the Isle of Wight. The Isle of Wight Society/Island Books. ISBN 1-898198-12-8.
- Medland, J (2007). The Making of the Wight - An illustrated history of the Isle of Wight. The Isle of Wight Beacon Ltd. ISBN 978-1-904149-14-9.
- G. Momber, J. Satchell & J. Gillespie (2011). "Bouldnor Cliff". British Archaeology (November - December 2011). York: Council for British Archaeology: 30–35. ISSN 1357-4442.
- J. Satchell; M. Beattie Edwards; J. Maddocks; M. Harvey (2009). Forton Lake Archaeology Project: Forton's Forgotten Fleet. Hampshire and Wight Trust for Maritime Archaeology/Nautical Archaeology Society. ISBN 978-0-9533950-1-9.
- B. Sparks; G. Momber; J. Satchell (2001). A Decade of Diving, Delving & Disseminating: The Hampshire and Wight Trust for Maritime Archaeology, 1991-2001. The Hampshire and Wight Trust for Maritime Archaeology. OCLC 550695960.
