= Bouldnor Cliff =

Mesolithic underwater archaeological site in Bouldnor, Isle of Wight, England

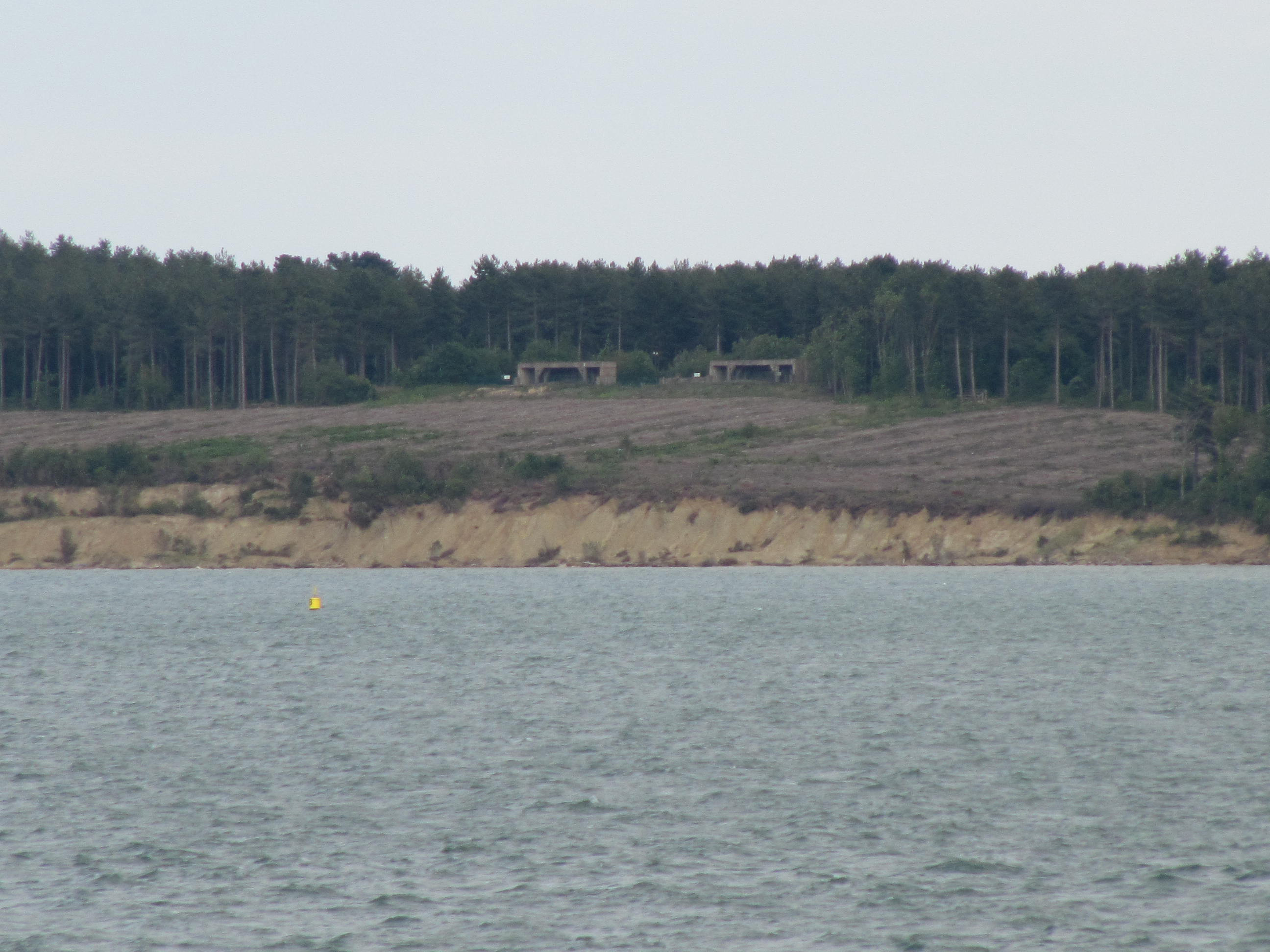
- Bouldnor Battery overlooking the Solent. Bouldnor Cliff lies under the water in front of the cliffs.

- Location within the United Kingdom
- 50°42′49″N 01°27′50″W
- Periods: Mesolithic
- Location: Bouldnor, Isle of Wight, United Kingdom
- Region: Solent

Site notes
- Condition: Submerged

Bouldnor Cliff is a submerged prehistoric settlement site in the Solent. The site dates from the Mesolithic era and is in approximately 11 metres (6 fathoms) of water just offshore of the village of Bouldnor on the Isle of Wight in the United Kingdom. The preservation of organic materials from this era that do not normally survive on dry land has made Bouldnor important to the understanding of Mesolithic Britain, and the BBC Radio 4's Making History programme described it "probably Europe's most important Mesolithic site" albeit concealed under water.

The site was first discovered by divers from the Hampshire and Wight Trust for Maritime Archaeology (now the Maritime Archaeology Trust) in 1999, when a lobster was observed discarding worked flint tools from its burrow on the seabed. Since then, several years of fieldwork have revealed that Bouldnor was a settlement site about 8,000 years ago, at a time when lower sea levels meant that the Solent was just a river valley. The work done so far has already revealed that the technology of Mesolithic settlers was probably 2,000 years ahead of what had previously been believed.

== Site formation ==
Investigations suggest that during the Mesolithic era, between 8000 and 4000 BC, the western Solent was a sheltered river basin, rich in woodland and fed by a river at Lymington and drained by the Western Yar at Freshwater. As sea levels rose, the Solent eventually flooded and the settlement area was swamped. The rising waters deposited silt and mud onto the original land surface, covering and preserving it.

== Discovery ==
Fishermen had reported recovering stone tools from the seabed of the Solent since the 1960s, but it was not until 1987 that the submerged remains of an ancient forest were discovered at Bouldnor. Later radiocarbon dating of pollen revealed this to be approximately 8,000 years old. Subsequently, regular dives revealed a submerged cliff east of Yarmouth with large quantities of peat that dated to a similar period.

The Hampshire and Wight Trust for Maritime Archaeology began mapping the cliff face and selected four main sites of interest (named BC 1–4). It was while diving in 11 metres (6 fathoms) of water on BC 2 in 1999, that divers noticed a burrowing lobster discarding worked flints from its burrow. The lobster had burrowed through thick mud deposits that had formed since the Solent flooded, and into the original surface of the cliff when the Solent was dry.

Since 1999, divers have excavated at Bouldnor every year. Further discoveries were made at BC 2 and BC 4, and later a new site was discovered nearby (BC 5). The dangerous diving conditions in the fast flowing waters of the Solent make archaeological investigation particularly difficult and archaeologists have used several new techniques to make analysis of the sea bed easier. This has included 'box sampling' – collecting large areas of sea bed in metal tins to raise them to the surface and more thoroughly excavate their contents on dry land.

== Findings ==
Archaeologists have discovered large quantities of burnt flints, mounds of timbers and pits dug into the ground. Wood from this era does not normally preserve well in land environments, so the quantity of wood found at Bouldnor makes the site of international importance.

Under a large mound of worked timbers at BC 5, archaeologists discovered large areas of burnt clay, burnt flint and charcoal, which has been interpreted as the floor of a living space. Other timbers show signs of having been extensively worked on. Some split oak suggests that particularly large structures, or possibly boats, were being constructed at the site. Another timber shows signs of having been fashioned as a type of conduit, which is not something that has ever been seen in Mesolithic archaeology before. Some of the worked timbers indicate technological skills that had previously only been associated with the Neolithic era, 2000 years later than Bouldnor.

Burnt hazelnuts and oak charcoal have also been found at BC 5. Like the wood, these types of organic material do not normally survive well in dry, land based, environments. A pit dug into the clay at BC 5 had been filled with burnt clay nodules, charcoal and burnt stones, which had been covered with a large piece of wood. Examining the pit walls revealed that the pit had probably been filled with hot stones on several occasions. Other trenches have revealed chipped wood flakes, flint knapping flakes and even wound fibres that appear to have been used as string. Many of the finds suggest evidence of small-scale industry as well as settlement.

The work done at Bouldnor is exhibited in the Maritime Archaeology Trust's Sunken Secrets exhibition at Fort Victoria on the Isle of Wight.

=== International trade ===
Research published in 2015 has identified wheat DNA at the site. As this wheat is of a type not native to Britain, it suggests the possibility of trade with Europe much earlier than had previously been supposed by archaeologists. This claim was questioned and it was suggested that the wheat DNA was too pristine and probably represents contamination. However, the original authors published a response to this contested point.

== Bibliography ==
- G. Momber; D. Tomalin; R. Scaife; J. Satchell; J. Gillespie (2011). Mesolithic occupation at Bouldnor Cliff and the submerged prehistoric landscapes of the Solent. The Council for British Archaeology. ISBN 978-1-902771-84-7.
- Momber. G; Satchell, J.; Gillespie, J. (2011). "Bouldnor Cliff". British Archaeology (November – December 2011). York: Council for British Archaeology: 30–35. ISSN 1357-4442.
