= Arslan Eyce Private Amphora Museum =

Museum in Taşucu, Turkey

- Arslan Eyce Özel Amphora Müzesi
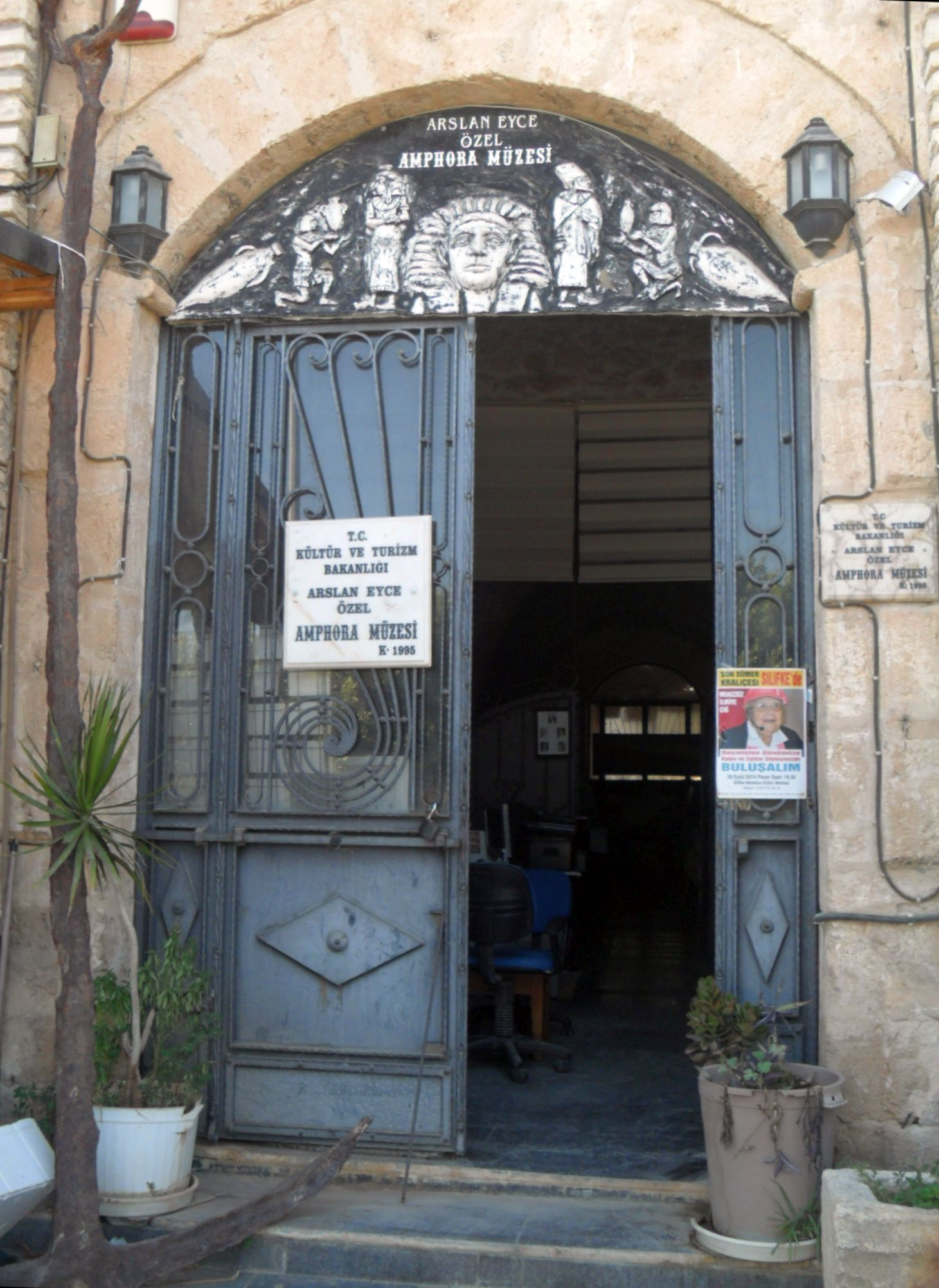
- Entrance of the museum.

- Location of the Amhora Museum in Turkey.
- Established: 2003; 23 years ago
- Location: İsmet Inonu Cad. 62/B, Tasucu, Silifke, Mersin, Turkey
- Coordinates: 36°19′03″N 33°52′40″E
- Type: Archaeology
- Collections: Amphora
- Collection size: 400
- Founder: Arslan Eyce
- Owner: Ministry of Culture and Tourism
- Website: Museum page

Arslan Eyce Private Amphora Museum, also known as Taşucu Amphora Museum, (Turkish: Arslan Eyce Özel Amphora Müzesi) is a maritime archaeology museum dedicated to amphora in Taşucu, Southern Turkey.

== Location ==
Taşucu, known as Holmi in antiquity, at 36°19′03″N 33°52′40″E is a seaside town in Silifke İlçe (district) of Mersin Province. Formerly, it was an important port. The museum is located in a 19th-century building on the İsmet İnönü Boulevard, which was originally a storage building.

== Ownership ==
The building now is a property of the museum foundation. Arslan Eyce, a citizen of Silifke, spent 40 years in collecting ancient amphorae mostly from shipwrecks. In 1997, the Ministry of Culture and Tourism (Turkey) took over the collection. After maintenance, the museum was officially opened in 2003.

== Collections ==
There are 400 amphorae in the museum. The exhibited amphorae span a long time from 3200 BC to 1800 AD.

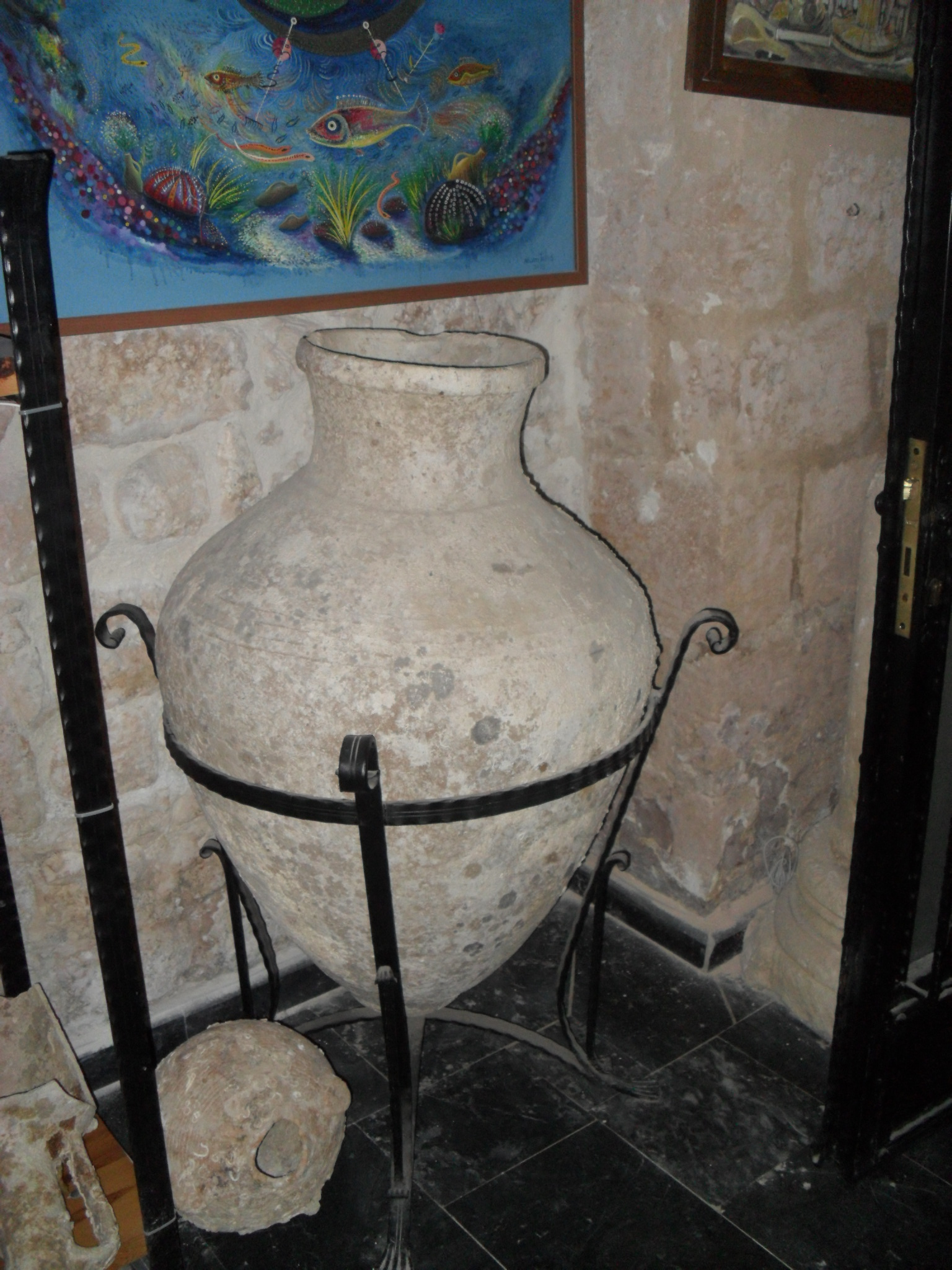
An amphora in the museum.
