= Maritime archaeology of East Africa =

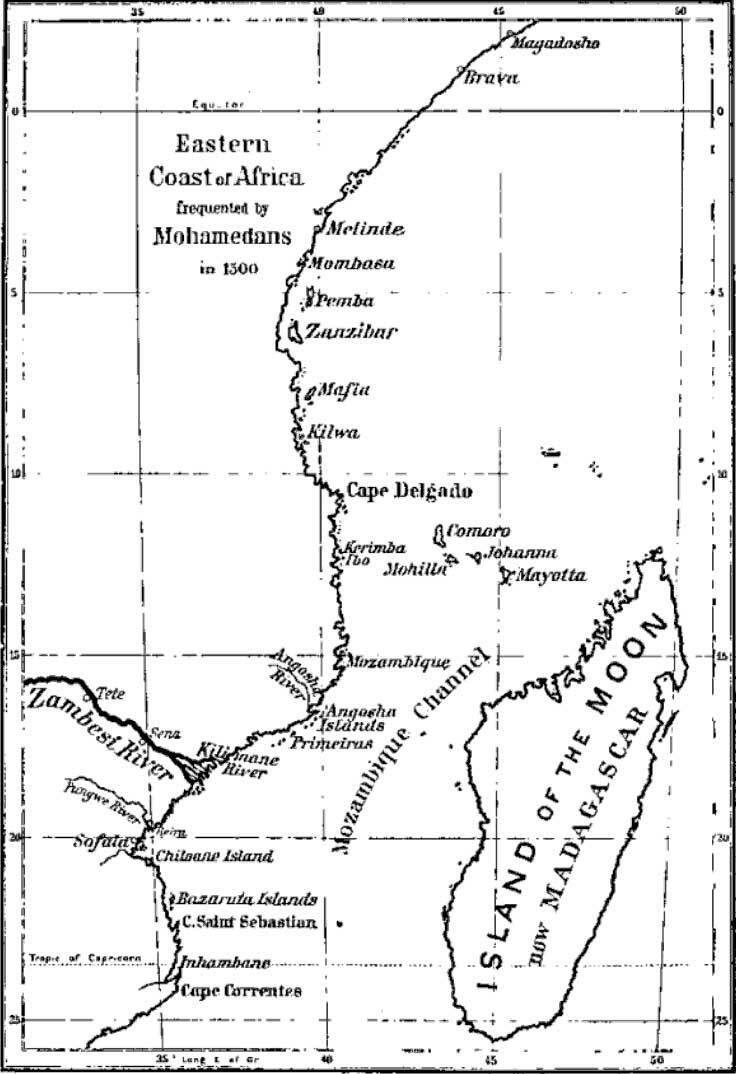
The coast of eastern Africa, c.1500 (George McCall Theal, 1902)

Maritime archaeology in East Africa spans the range from the horn of Somalia south to Mozambique, and includes the various islands and island chains dotting the map off the coast of Somalia, Mozambique, Tanzania and Kenya. Primary areas along this coast include the Zanzibar (including the Mafia islands), Lamu, and Kilwa Archipelagos. Although East African societies developed nautical capabilities for themselves, most of the maritime artifacts point to external merchants from Mediterranean cultures like Egypt and Greece, Indian and Chinese from South and East Asia in the early stages, to the great European powers during the Ages of Colonization and Imperialism.

== Sea movement ==
While the use of ocean marine resources dates back to as early as 60 kya in South African sites such as Blombos Cave, and later along the east coast, the record for the use of nautical technologies is less known. Based on dating of LSA sites in Zanzibar Cave on the island of Zanzibar, the use of nautical technology would date at least to the 7th or 8th century AD for the Tanzanian coastal cultures that moved from the mainland to inhabit the island. That date can be pushed back even further by sites discovered in the Mafia Archipelago, sites which suggest colonization during the Early Iron Age, which has been dated to between the 1st and 6th century AD. The exact time of settlement is up for debate though, as studies performed in Kuumbi Cave show. Kuumbi Cave is located near the southeast coast of Zanzibar, based on artifacts dated from the site there is an argument presented that the residents of Zanzibar crossed over a land bridge that existed in the late Pliocene, before the sea level rose around 8000 BC. Archaeologists believe that as coastal areas were easier to reach than inland areas along Eastern Africa, most interactions between cultural groups were longitudinal in nature. This trade started long before the implementation of boats, but was made easier after the fact.

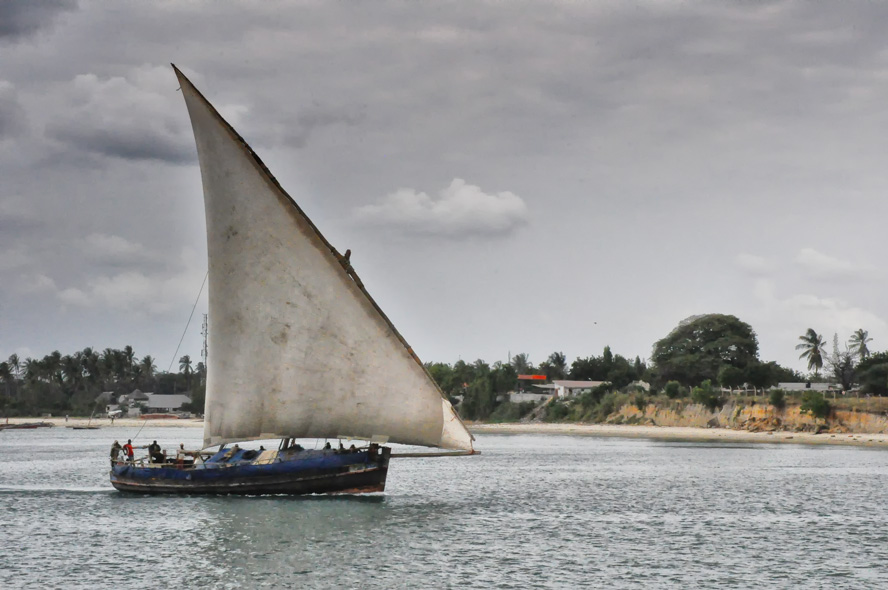
Fishing dhow

=== African vessels ===
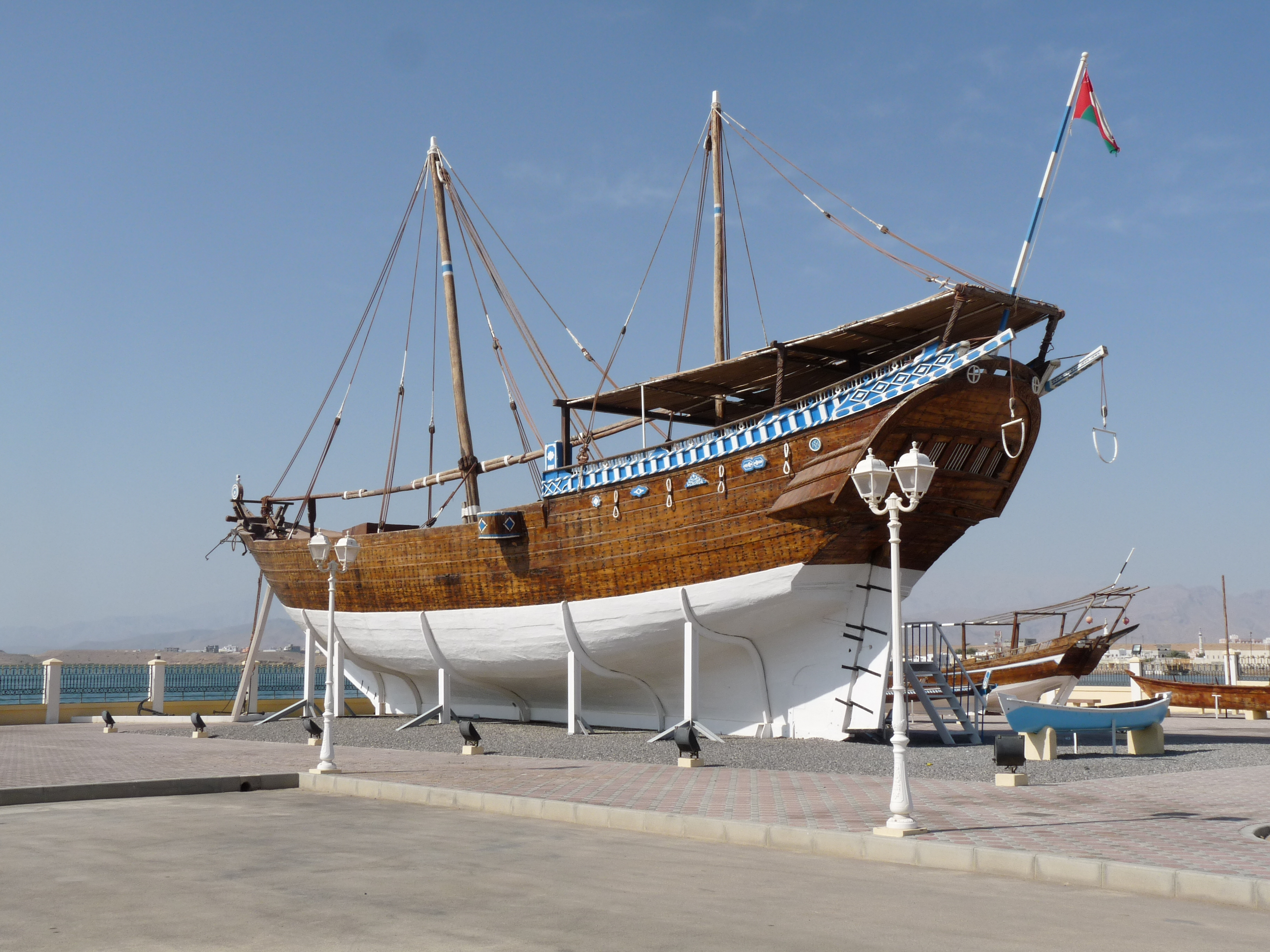
Trade or transport dhow

When outside cultures like Rome, India and China encountered the East African coast, they did not come to people foreign to the concept of boat usage, though the scale was much different. While both came in large trading vessels the local Africans relied more on vessels that kept close to the coast which were used more for local trading and fishing than long expeditions. East Africans to this day use a ship style called a dhow which was introduced by the Arabic merchants who came into the region. The dhow is not one particular ship design, but more of a class of ships, with sizes and schematics ranging from the smaller fishing dhow to the much larger dhows used for transporting goods and passengers.

== Outside contact ==
East Africa has had a long history of connections to the global marketplace, having been a direct part of the Silk Road and Maritime Indian Cotton and Spice Route as early as the 1st century AD. It has become home to people of many ethnicities, including Arabic merchants and settlers, Indian and Chinese sailors, European merchants and remnants of the European colonial families, and the culture groups that are descended from those who were there to begin with.

=== Contact with Rome ===
Roman trade vessels would make the 3,000 nautical mile journey south from the important trade ports of Myos Hormos and Berenice in Egypt to the African trade port of Zanzibar. There exists to this day, what has been classified as a sea journal of a Roman pilot or merchant from the 1st century AD, this journal is called the Periplus Maris Erythraei, and it records the voyage of a Roman trade ship that sailed from the Red Sea south along the African coast to India.

=== Contact with China and East Asia ===
In the 1400s AD the East African coast encountered the trading fleets of China, led by Zheng He, the Chinese trader and servant of the Emperor. From geophysical surveying of the coast around Lamu Kenya, archaeologists have discovered what appear to be Chinese porcelain artifacts dating to the 14th century AD, local legend and heritage has it that one or more Chinese vessels were lost in the area.

=== Contact with Arabia ===
Today, the East African coast has become almost synonymous with the term "Swahili coast", the Swahili coast being denoted by peoples of the Swahili culture which is a combination of Arabic language and culture and the language and culture of the native peoples of Africa. Much of the land range is the same, but the Swahili culture extends into the northern coast of Madagascar and into northern Somalia, Djibouti and Eritrea.

=== Contact with Europe ===
While European powers were familiar with the goods of Africa's east coast, it was not until their ships were able to get around the southern cape of Africa that their connections to the coast became direct. With the rush for land, resources and power beginning in the late 15th century AD by Europe, encountering the rich coast of East Africa was a goldmine, both figuratively and literally as cities like Mogadishu in Somalia and Sofala in Mozambique being hubs for gold obtained from the interior of the continent.

Off Ras Ngomeni, Kenya, archaeologists discovered 16th century AD shipwreck which, along with certain artifacts found with the ship suggest European origins and Portuguese ownership. The artifacts in question are copper ingots marked with a seal of ownership, the seal being of a trident.

== Important ports ==
- Kilwa Kisiwani - Tanzania
- Stone Town (Mje Mkongwe) - Zanzibar, Tanzania
- Rhapta - Unknown
- Fort Jesus - Mombasa Island, Kenya
- Lamu - Lamu Island, Kenya
- Shanga - Pate Island, Kenya
- Mogadishu - Somalia
- Sofala - Mozambique

== Underwater sites ==
While some underwater sites have been identified and are under analysis, little is known about the overall quantity and diversity of the wrecks to be found along the coast. In some cities along the coast, like Kilwa in Tanzania, and Lamu in Kenya, archaeologists have found images of Arabic ships carved into the walls of mosques, which are interpreted as being requests of protection for the ships carved. The most common finds are anchor weights, left at mooring points by ships or the port for the anchorage of vessels.

As mentioned above, Chinese goods were identified by geophysical surveys in the Pate Bay, near Lamu.

The best cataloged sunken ships by Edward Pollard of the British Institute in Eastern Africa are the three that sunk in the Rufiji Delta during World War 1, the German cruiser SMS Königsberg and accompanying coal transport Somali, and the British ship the Newbridge, a turret ship which was scuttled to block the SMS Königsberg from leaving the Delta.

Near Fort Jesus on Mombasa Island there lays the wreck of the Santo António de Tanná, a Portuguese frigate, sunk in 1697 while fighting the Omani fleet who was attempting capture of the fort.

== See also ==
- Archaeology of Pemba Island
- Unguja Ukuu
