= Bouldnor =

Hamlet on the Isle of Wight, England

Coordinates: 50.7073°N 01.4786°W

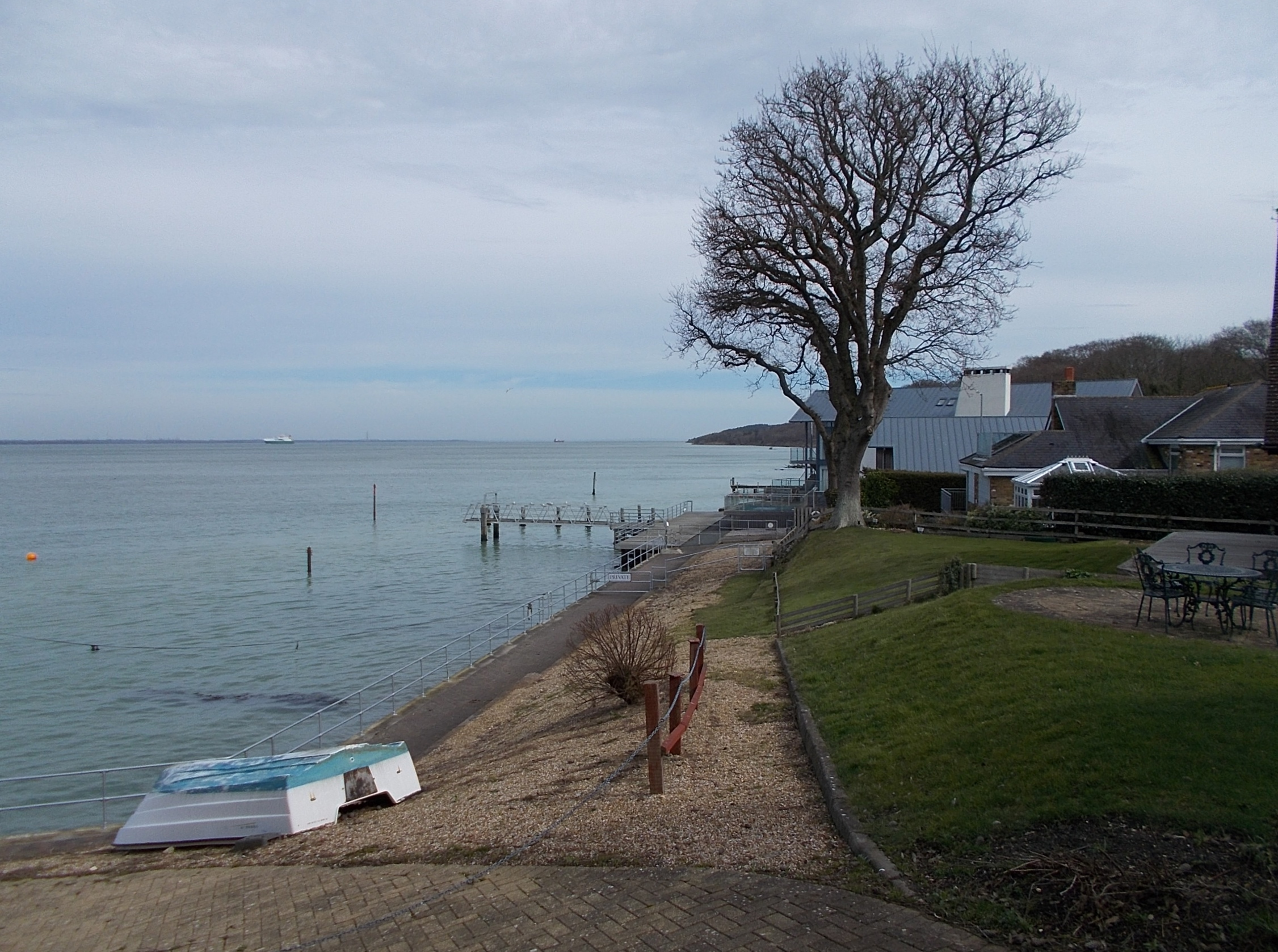
- Port La Salle, Bouldnor

- Location within the Isle of Wight
- OS grid reference: SZ3789
- Civil parish: Shalfleet
- Shire county: Isle of Wight
- Region: South East
- Country: England
- Sovereign state: United Kingdom
- Post town: Yarmouth
- Postcode district: PO41
- Police: Hampshire and Isle of Wight
- Fire: Hampshire and Isle of Wight
- Ambulance: Isle of Wight
- UK Parliament: Isle of Wight West

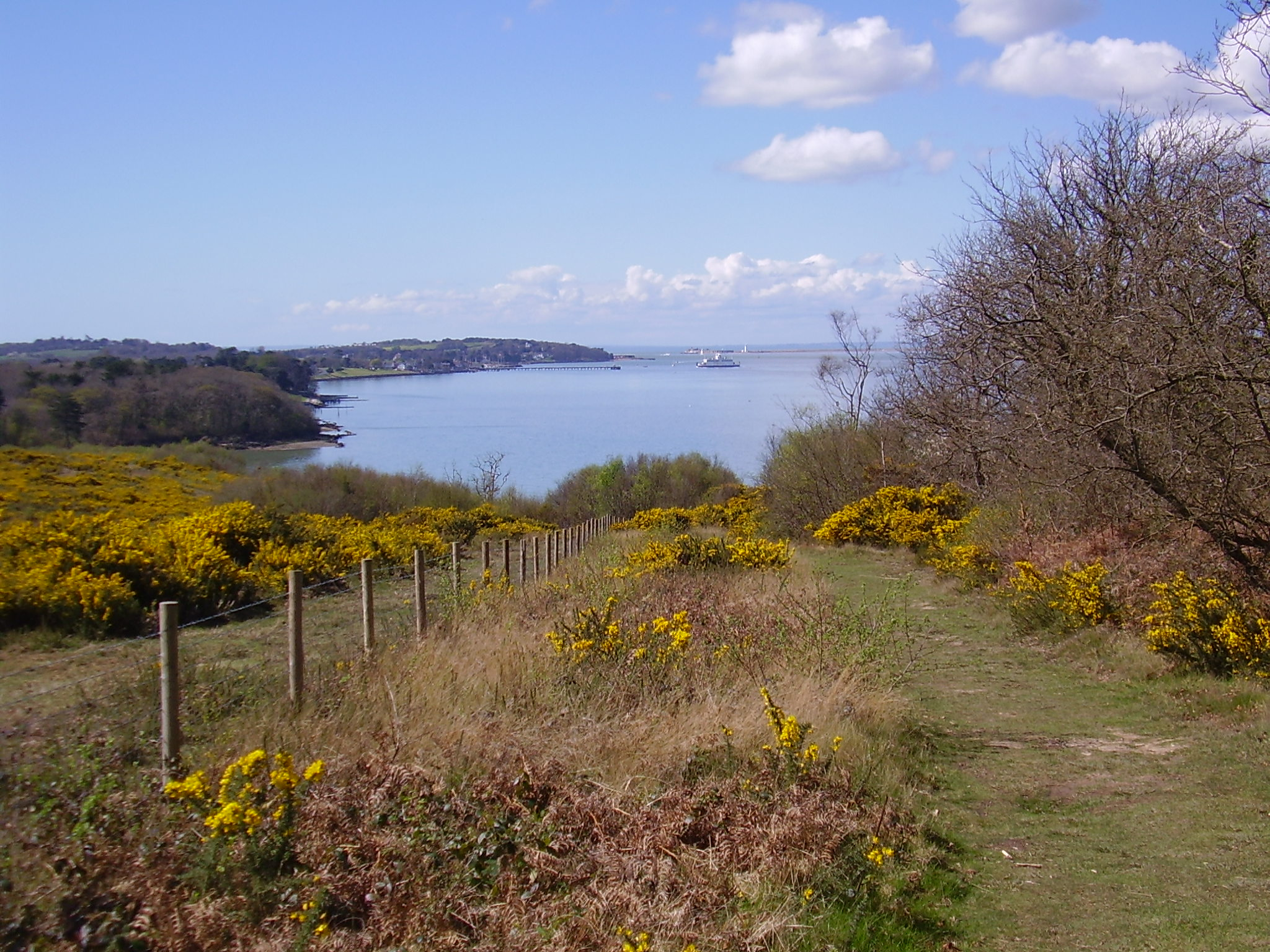
View west from the edge of Bouldnor Copse, above Bouldnor Cliff. In the distance is Yarmouth with its pier, and in the very far distance, Hurst Castle.

Bouldnor is a hamlet near Yarmouth on the west coast of the Isle of Wight in southern England. It is the location of Bouldnor Battery, a gun battery emplacement.

Bouldnor is located on the A3054 road, and public transport is provided by buses on Southern Vectis route 7.

A soapbox derby was held in Bouldnor in 2005. It was a big success, so the event was repeated in 2006, though moved to Newport and renamed the Isle of Wight Soapbox Derby Challenge.

== Name ==
The name literally means 'the shore of the bull' or 'the bull's shore', from Old English bula (genitive case bulan) and ōra. The name may refer to bulls grazing there, or Bouldnor Cliff, which may have resembled a bull. Topographical features named after animals are very common, for example Cowes and East Cowes.

~1150: Boulner

1181: Bolenoura

1202: Bulner

1299: Bolnor

1345: Bulenore

1769: East and West Bouldner

== The Bouldnor Cliff Mesolithic Village seaport ==
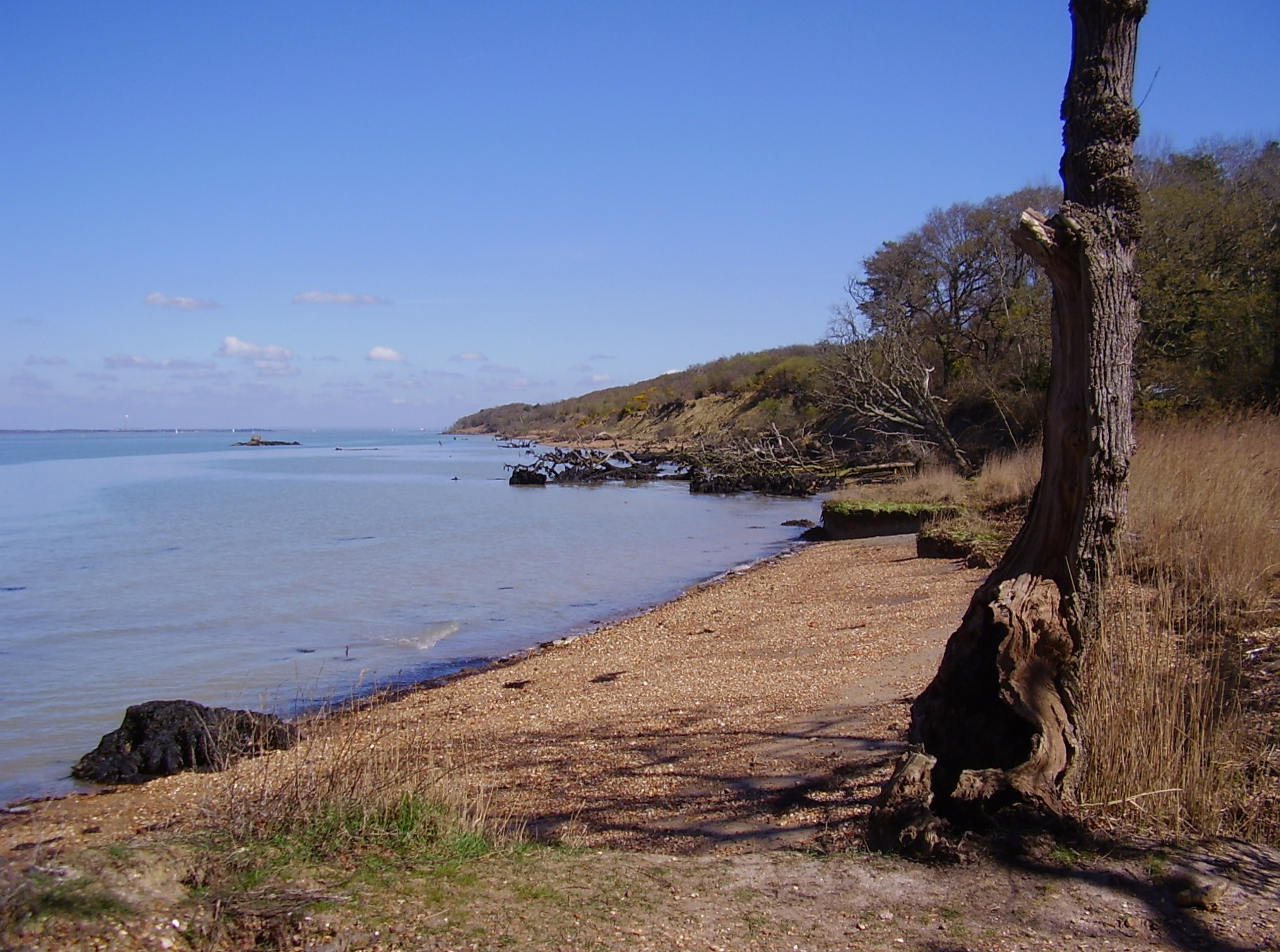
The beach at Bouldnor

The Bouldnor Cliff Mesolithic Village is an internationally important archaeological site underwater off the coast of the Bouldnor Cliffs. Mesolithic flints and other items have been found. This material dates from 8000 years ago. During the Neolithic, this was a seaport that supported trade with the Middle East (as wheat was present here 8,000 years ago, hundreds of years before wheat was grown anywhere in Europe). Bronze Age Britain had large reserves of tin in the areas of Cornwall and Devon. Mining in Cornwall and Devon was then of global importance. Tin is necessary to smelt bronze. At that time the sea level was much lower and carts of tin were brought across the Solent at low tide for export from Bouldnor, possibly on the Ferriby Boats and later on the Blackfriars Ships.
