= Dover Bronze Age Boat =

Bronze Age boat discovered 1992

Coordinates: 51.1236°N 1.3142°E

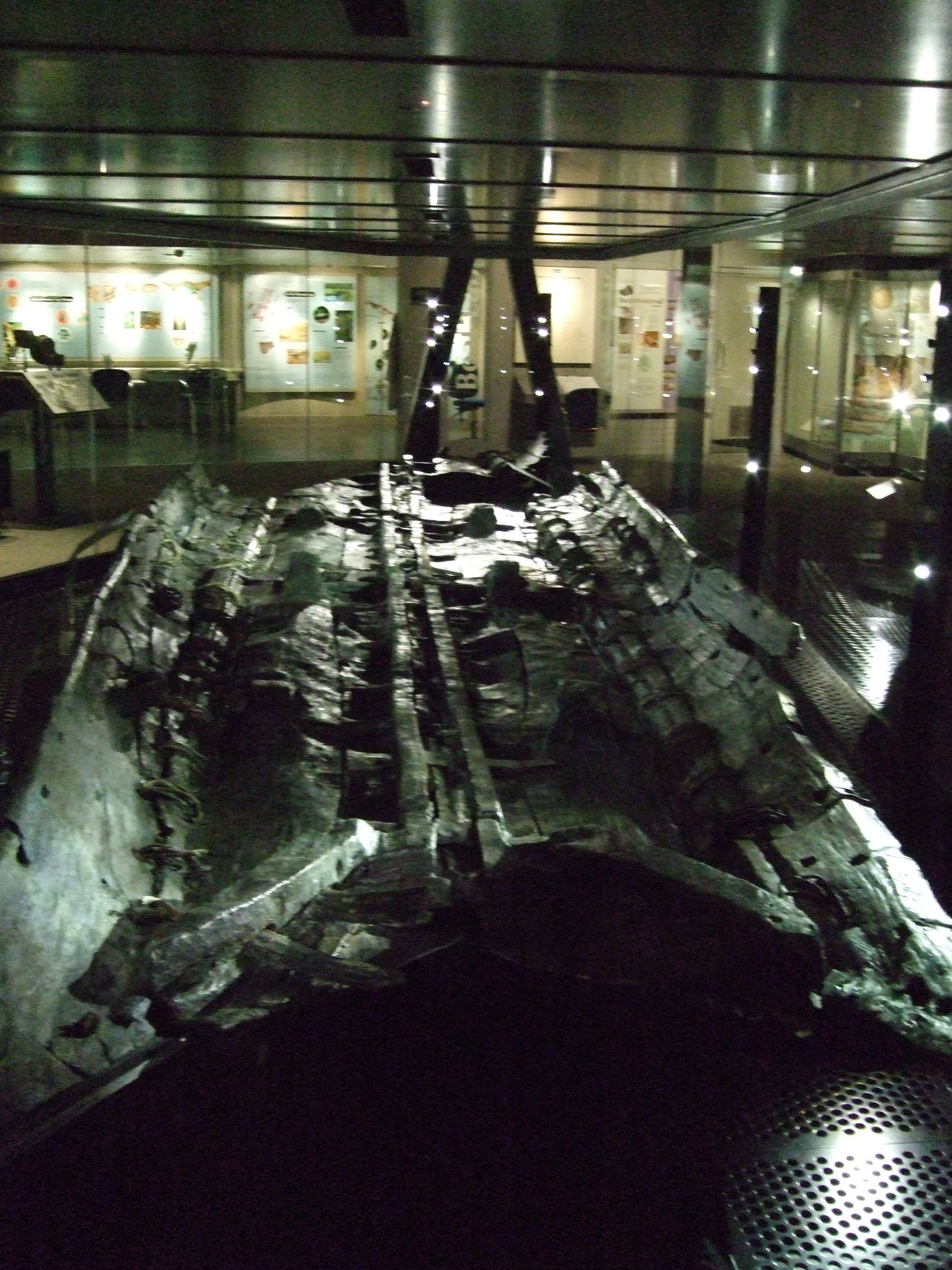
Dover Bronze Age Boat at Dover Museum

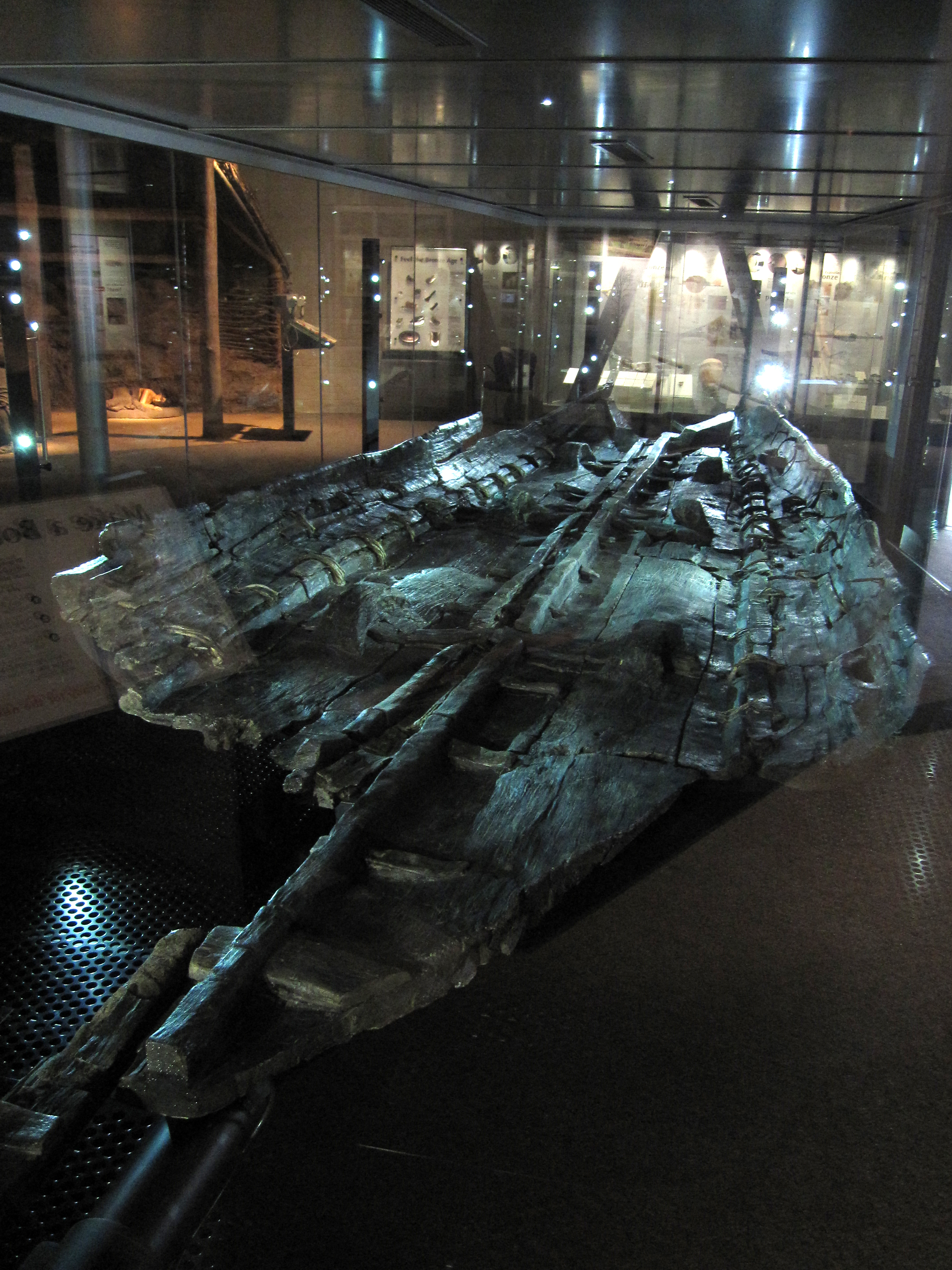
Dover Bronze Age Boat at Dover Museum

The Dover Bronze Age boat is one of fewer than 20 Bronze Age boats so far found in Britain. It dates to 1575–1520 BC, which may make it one of the oldest substantially intact boats in the world (older boat finds are small fragments, some less than a metre square) – though much older ships exist, such as the Khufu ship from 2500 BC. The boat was made using oak planks sewn together with yew lashings. This technique has a long tradition of use in British prehistory; the oldest known examples are the narrower Ferriby boats from east Yorkshire. A 9.5m long section of the boat is on display at Dover Museum.

== Discovery and excavation ==
On 28 September 1992, construction workers from Norwest Holst (who were building the new A20 road link between Folkestone and Dover), working alongside archaeologists from the Canterbury Archaeological Trust, uncovered what remained of a large prehistoric boat thought to be 3,500 years old. This would place its origin around 1500 BC, in the Middle Bronze Age in England.

The boat was buried 200 metres inshore and 6 metres under a road and the burial site stretched out towards buildings. It was decided that it would be too dangerous to dig too near the buildings, so an unknown length of the boat has had to be left under the ground. Previous attempts to remove such boats whole have been unsuccessful, so it was decided to cut the boat into sections and remove it and reassemble it afterwards. After nearly a month of excavation 9.5 metres of the boat was eventually recovered. Depending on different views of the true size of the complete boat, this 9.5 metres could be up to two thirds of the full size of the boat. The boat had been partially damaged by the construction of a Roman harbour wall. It showed signs of having been repaired on a number of occasions before becoming buried, including a split down the eastern side that had been filled with other pieces of wood.

== Oldest sea-going boat? ==
All sewn plank boats discovered in the region were found in estuaries. They were found in two chronological periods. Six boats date to the first half of the 2nd millennium BC. Near the Humber estuary there was one at Kilnsea and three at Ferriby (#1, #2, and #3). Boats from this period were also found at Dover and at Caldicot (#1) on the Welsh south coast. The other sewn plank boats all date to the eleventh to the ninth centuries BC. Based on radiocarbon dating, Ferriby 1 dates to 1880–1680BC, Ferriby 2 to 1940–1720BC and Ferriby 3 to 2030–1780BC.

The River Dour leads straight into the English Channel, so speculation has been made ever since its discovery about whether the Dover boat went to sea and sailed to the Continent. There is plenty of evidence that there was cross-Channel communication, but it is not known what kind of boats actually sailed across. Keith Miller, a regional archaeologist told the BBC that the older Ferriby boats would have been used to cross the North Sea and certainly the Ferriby Heritage Trust describe Ferriby Boat 3 as Europe's first known seacraft. The BBC television programme Operation Stonehenge: What Lies Beneath Pt 2, broadcast on BBC Two in September 2014, describes the Ferriby boat as seagoing and describes the tons of cargo it could have taken across the Channel.

Dover Museum considers that with a date of approximately 1550 BC, the Dover Bronze Age Boat is the oldest seagoing boat known. They are backed by a different channel and programme from the BBC- Neil Oliver in the Bronze Age episode of A History of Ancient Britain. They are also backed by a Time Team Special, broadcast on 7 September 2014 on UK Channel 4, which stated that to be a proper sea-going, cross-channel vessel the boat would have to have the curved 'rocker' bottom and the (unproven) pointed bow that only the more modern Dover boat allegedly possesses. Confusingly, the Oakleaf reproduction of the Ferriby boats was given a pointed bow and the Ferriby boats are described by the museum that houses them as having curved rocker bottoms, which sounds much the same as the Dover boat.

== Data of Remains ==
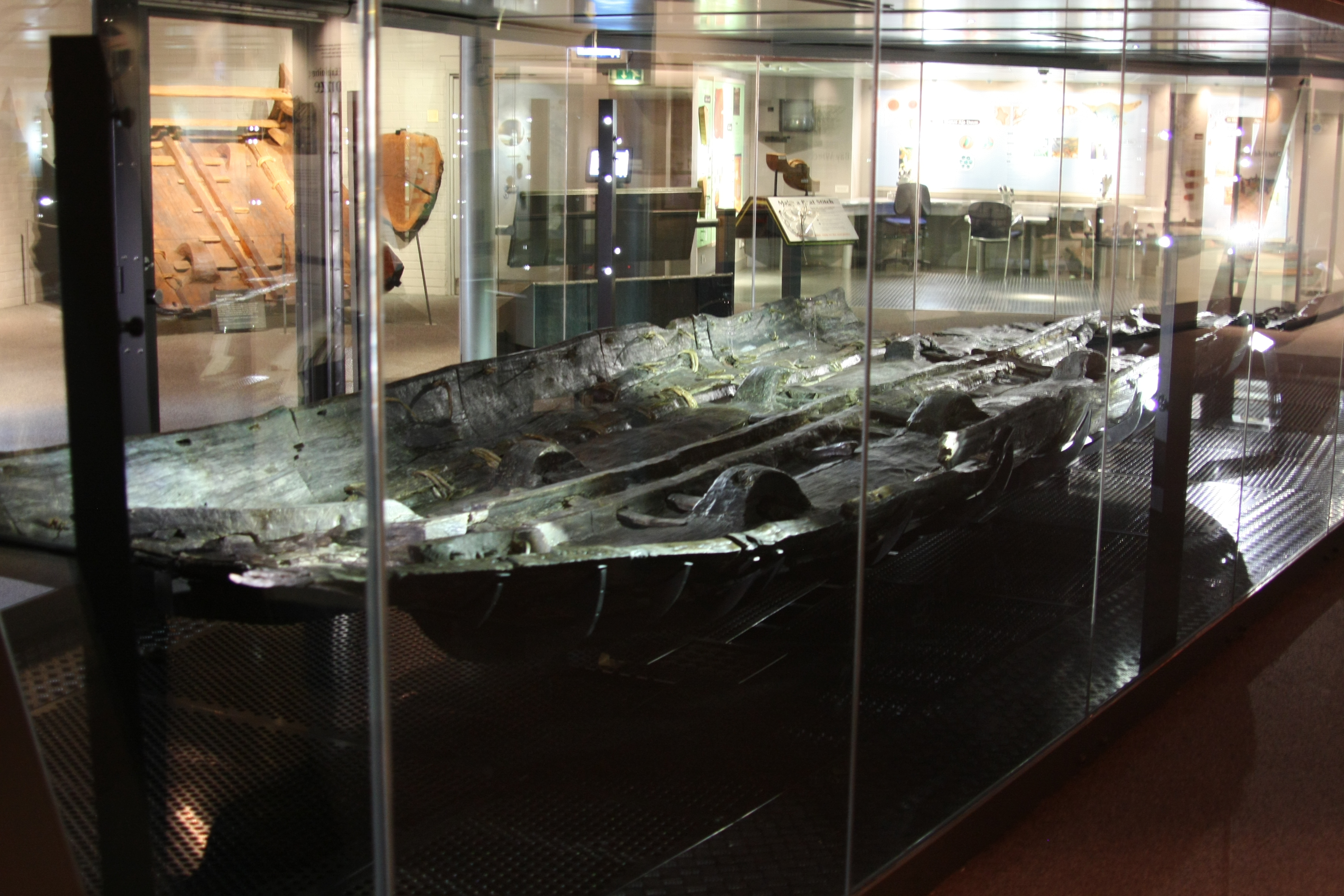
The Dover Boat

Little is yet known about the boat in use as few clues were left with it. According to A History of Ancient Britain, the boat was laid to rest, still in good condition, in a smaller channel off the Dour river and the yew stitches were deliberately cut, leaving it unusable. It was preserved by being covered quickly in silt.

=== Dimensions ===
The recovered remains are around 9.5 x 2 m As part of the boat remains underground and there is no proof of the boat's overall shape and size, much speculation as to its total length and its shape has been made. The museum shows suggestions, but the boat could easily be little more than has been removed from the ground, or perhaps many metres longer. The width of the boat is significant, being around 2 metres wide it is much wider than dugout canoes of the time and can easily seat two people next to each other. It is wider than the Ferriby boats, for example.

=== Composition and construction ===
The boat was constructed of oak planks, stitched together with yew withies and also fixed together with wooden wedges driven into cleats carved from the planks. This makes it similar to the Ferriby boats, which are also stitched planks. It is, however, quite different from the Must Farm dugouts, which are not only dug out of one trunk, but the smaller, lightweight ones are made of lighter linden trunks.

== Conservation and re-assembly ==
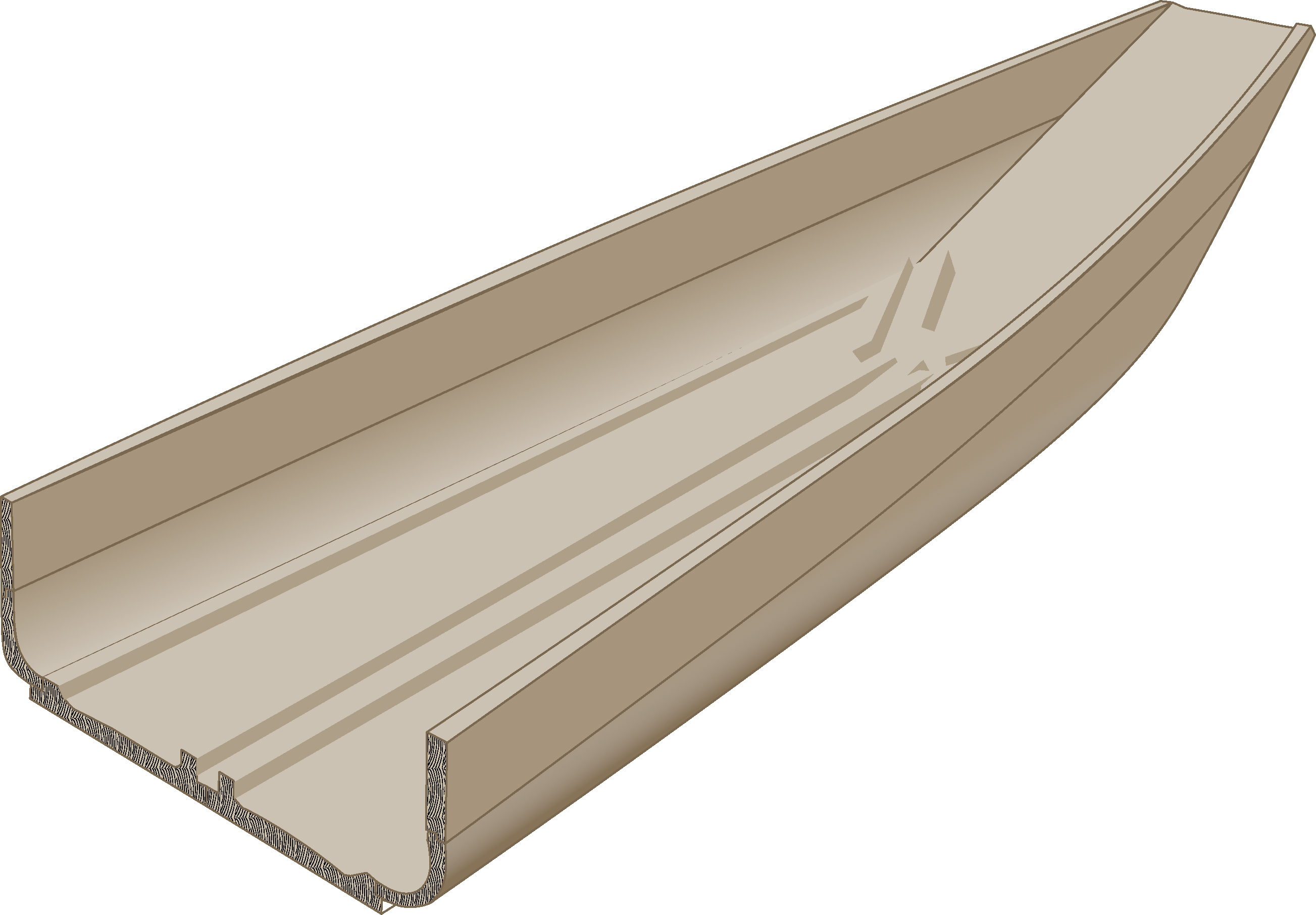
Diagram

Whilst in the ground the boat was significantly protected from being destroyed by waterlogging and a cover of silt which protected it from bacteria. After being removed from the ground the boat was kept in a waterlogged state at the Mary Rose Trust at Portsmouth. After a long process of preservation the boat returned to Dover Museum to be re-assembled in 1998.

The boat is displayed in a glass case as the centrepiece of a whole floor in the museum devoted to archaeology. With the boat itself is a modern reconstruction of a section of the boat, to assist in the visitors interpretation of the boat itself. The display won an award in 2000 for archaeological display.

== Reconstructions ==
First, a full-size three-metre section of the boat was built, experimenting with techniques etc. This is also housed in the Dover Museum with the original.

=== The Ole Crumlin-Pederson ===
A half-size reconstruction of the Dover Boat was completed in Dover in 2012 but, due to time constraints was assembled using modern silicone caulking materials and stitched with modern ropes. The first attempts to launch the boat failed when the boat immediately shipped a lot of water, but it later managed to travel around the Channel area in different countries. The boat, initially named BC 1550 has since been officially named after one of its builders, Ole Crumlin-Pederson. The boat was later dismantled and reassembled using Bronze Age materials consisting of moss mixed with animal fat as caulking, and was stitched together with yew lashings. It has now been sailed out from Dover Harbour and was filmed for a Time Team Special for the UK Channel 4.

An almost full-size reconstruction of a sewn plank boat was created in the National Maritime Museum Cornwall in 2012–13, launched in March 2013 and sailed round Falmouth Harbour.

== See also ==
- Sewn boat
- List of surviving ancient ships
