= Ras Ngomeni =

Ancient Swahili port in Kenya, known for ruins and maritime archaeological discoveries

Ras Ngomeni is a cape on the Indian Ocean coast of Kenya. A Swahili settlement lay just to its south between the 5th and 13th centuries. It continued as a harbour into the 16th century.

According to the Book of the Zanj, Ngomeni was founded by the king of Himyar, Abu Karib, who reigned in AD 390–420. It was built on the north side of Sheshale Point and the Sabaki river in an area of saltwater lagoons. Its major product was mangroves. It was overtaken by the sea in the 13th century. As of 1961, only a house remained of the original town. It is sometimes called Old Ngomeni to distinguish it from modern Ngomeni in the interior. In 2007, a Portuguese shipwreck was discovered off Ngomeni. It dates to 1500–1550, making it the oldest shipwreck yet found in sub-Saharan Africa.

Today, the name Ngomeni refers to a fishing village about 30 kilometres (19 mi) north of Malindi. It is the site of the Broglio Space Center, which belongs to Italy.

== See also ==
- Maritime archaeology of East Africa
