= Bouldnor Battery =

- Bouldnor, Isle of Wight, England
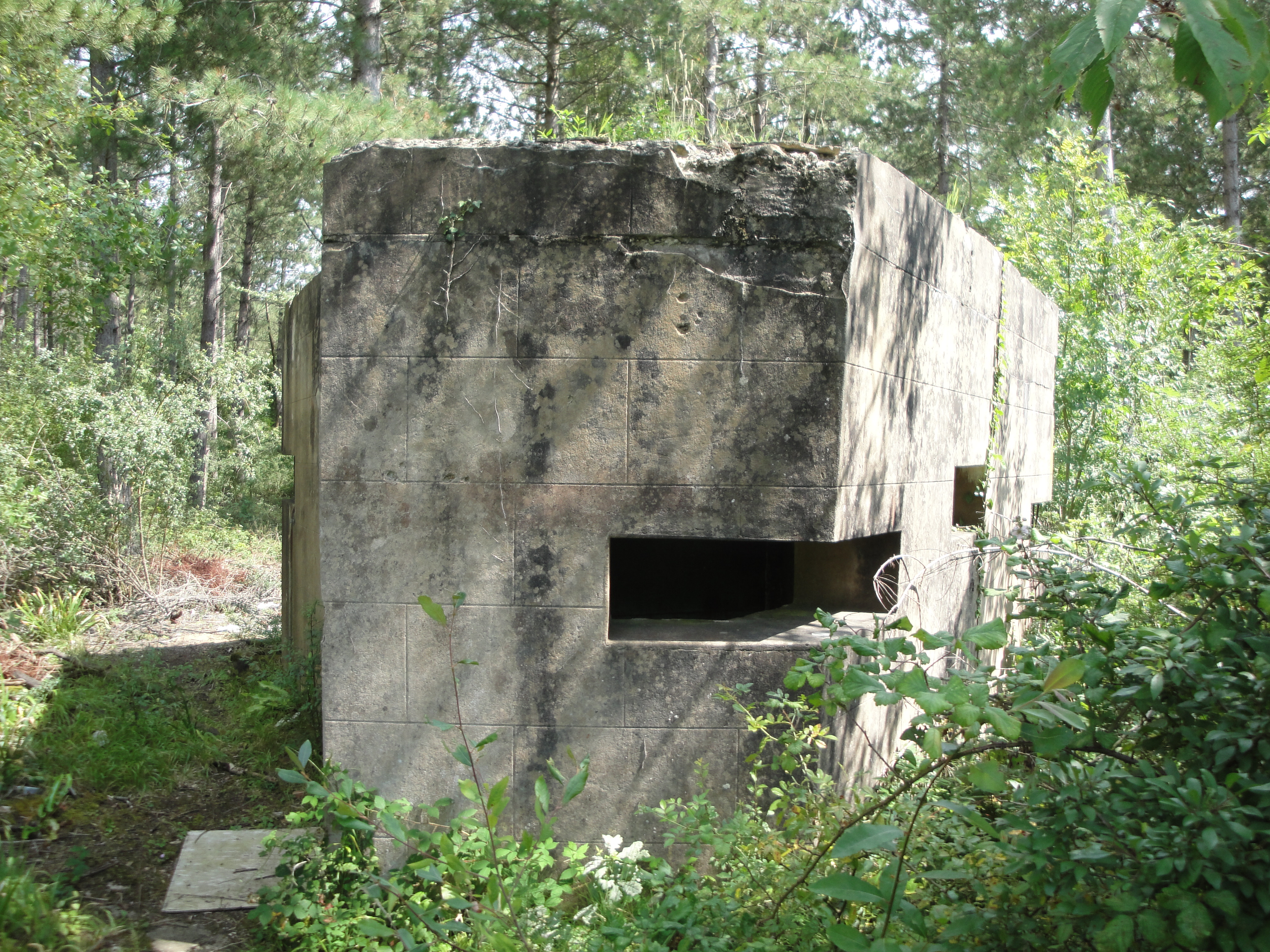
- Bouldnor Battery

Site information
- Open to the public: No
- Condition: Decommissioned

Location
- Coordinates: 50°42′35″N 1°27′51″W

Site history
- Built: 1937–1938
- In use: 1939–1956
- Events: World War II

Bouldnor Battery is a military battery located in Bouldnor on the Isle of Wight. It saw active service in World War II and was fully decommissioned in 1956. Today, it is a Scheduled Ancient Monument.

== History ==
The battery was built from 1937 to 1938 to protect an anchorage on the east side of Yarmouth. It was equipped with two 6-inch Mk VII guns, electric ammunition hoists and two searchlight emplacements nearby. A pillbox was also built to protect the access road, and the battery was manned by the Isle of Wight Rifles. The battery was stood down in December 1942, although it was reactivated with the addition of a Bofors anti-aircraft gun in 1944. The battery was once again stood down in 1945, with all its armaments removed by 1947, but it was re-used for gun practice from 1951 to 1955. British coastal defences were finally abandoned in 1956 and the battery was fully disarmed.

Today, the remains of the battery are used as water storage tanks, and so it is not possible to see much of the structure compared with others on the Isle of Wight. The magazines and crew shelters are flooded and form an important habitat for rare newt species. The battery is situated within a forest that is now used for cadets as an assault course and weekend retreats.

== Publications ==
- Cantwell, Anthony (1986). The Needles Defences. Isle of Wight: Solent Papers. ISBN 1870113012.
