= Prehistoric settlement of the British Isles =

Prehistoric settlement of the British Isles refers to the earliest establishment and expansion of human settlements in locations in the British Isles.

These include:

- Neolithic British Isles
- Prehistoric Britain
  - Bronze Age Britain
  - British Iron Age
- Prehistoric Ireland
- Prehistoric Scotland
  - Prehistoric Orkney
- Prehistoric Wales
