= Dover Museum =

Local history museum in Dover, England

Coordinates: 51°07′30″N 1°18′48″E

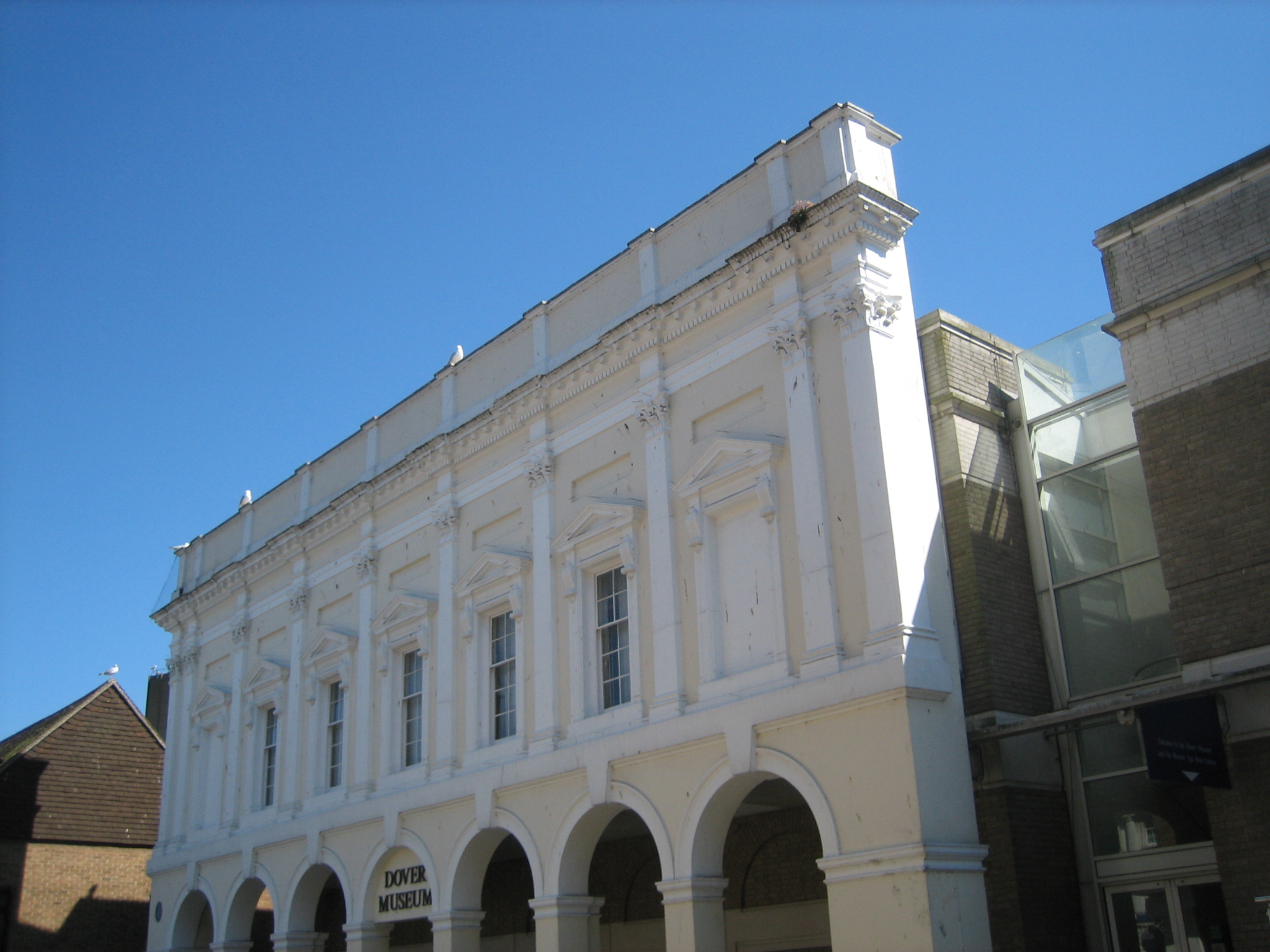
- Location: Dover, England
- Website: www.dovermuseum.co.uk

Dover Museum is a museum in Dover, Kent, in south-east England.

== History ==
Founded in February 1836 by the town's mayor Edward Pett Thompson, it was initially housed in the old Guildhall and run by the Dover Philosophical Institute. The Town Council (predecessor of Dover District Council) formally took it over 12 years later, constructing a new building to house it and the town's market, in Market Square.

Shelled from France in 1942 during the Second World War, the museum lost much of its collections, including nearly all of its natural history collections. Much of the surviving material was left neglected in caves and other stores until 1946, and it is estimated only 30% of the pre-war collection survived to that date. In 1948 a 'temporary' museum was opened in the Town Hall's undercroft, but this in fact lasted until 1991, when a new museum building on three stories (behind the museum's original Victorian facade) was opened in Market Square.

On 20 July 1999 the Queen opened a new gallery on the museum's second floor centred on the Dover Bronze Age Boat. In December 2000, this gallery was awarded the British Archaeological Awards ICI Award 2000, for its contribution to archaeological knowledge.

== Collections ==
Its collections, displayed on three floors include:

- Ground floor — Archaeology gallery — Dover and the Dover District Council area (including Deal and Walmer, which do not yet have their own town museum, only the Deal Maritime and Local History Museum, and the Deal Timeball) from prehistoric times to 1066, including Roman and Saxon Dover (including the Saxon cemetery from Buckland). It reuses a diorama of Claudius's imagined arrival on an elephant at Richborough Castle in 43 AD, and full-size reconstructed figures of a Celt and a Roman, all three of which are from the now defunct White Cliffs Experience next door.
- First floor – Temporary exhibition gallery.
- Second floor:
  - History of Dover town, Cinque Ports and Dover Castle from 1066 to the modern era. This includes the Victoriana Museum collection, bequeathed in 1990 by William Williamson of Deal and including works by artists such as Dame Laura Knight, Lady Alma Tadema, Fantin Latour, J.F. Herring, Henry Bernard Chalon, David Cox, E.W. Cooke and Benjamin Robert Haydon.
  - The 2003 Dover Bronze Age Boat gallery, where the Langdon Bay hoard is also displayed.

== White Cliffs Experience ==
The White Cliffs Experience was a visitor attraction in Dover, attached to Dover Museum. It opened in 1991 and, though it underwent a refit halfway through its life, it still did not prove a success and closed in 1999. It included a Blitz Experience (an audio-visual street scene of World War II).

Only a small portion of the actual archaeology was on display, the attraction instead being reliant on dioramas and audio-visual displays. Even after one redesign, it did not prove a success and has now been closed and its building converted into the Dover Library and Discovery Centre. That portion of the archaeology can still be viewed, but only by request from the library staff. Many of the dioramas and reconstruction figures have been reused in Dover Museum.

The White Cliffs Experience was closed in 1999 for a combination of reasons; the Labour opposition group on Dover District Council had always been against the WCE, labelling it 'The White Elephant Experience' and opposing the amount of money it took to run as well as complaining that it fell short of achieving the predicted 300,000 visitors a year.

When they came to power in 1997, the new Labour council's policies for regenerating Dover relied on attracting industry and acting as an 'enabler' rather than a provider of heritage and tourism facilities. They withdrew much of the money previously paid to tourism initiatives. At the same time, the technology used to run the animatronics and shows (laser discs, carousel slide projectors and 35mm film projectors, etc.) had quickly dated and become obsolete, and by 1998 needed replacing. Various quotes were received to update the WCE but were beyond what the Council were prepared to pay, so they decided to cut their losses and close the Experience.

== See also ==
- Dubris for Ancient Roman remains
