= Yarmouth Roads Wreck =

Coordinates: 50.7092°N 1.4947°W

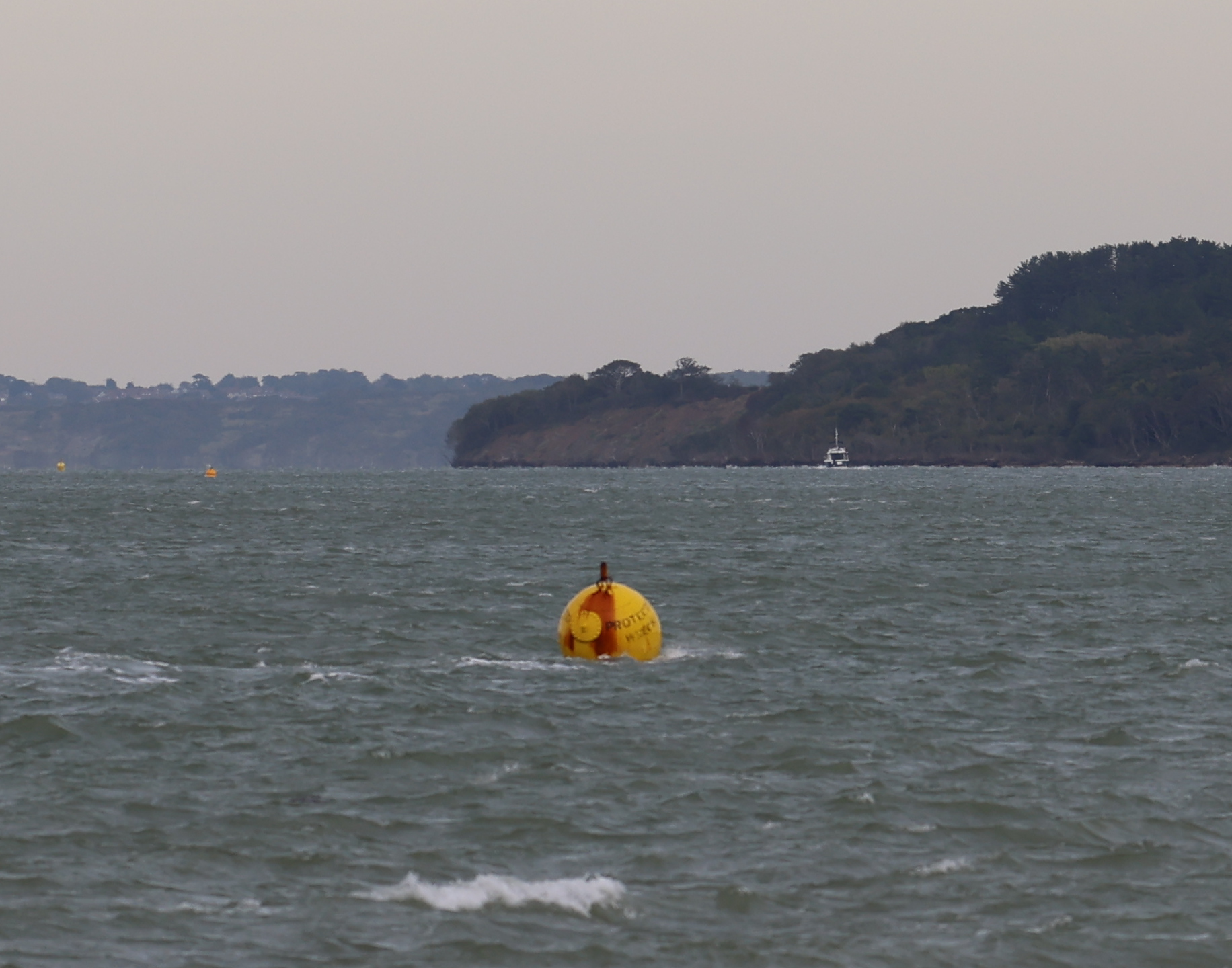
The buoy marking the site of the wreck

The remains of a late sixteenth or early seventeenth century carrack was discovered in Yarmouth Roads, Isle of Wight, England in 1984. The site was designated under the Protection of Wrecks Act on 9 April 1984. The wreck is a Protected Wreck managed by Historic England.

== The wreck ==
The wreck lies on a ledge and consists of four well preserved fragments of wreck material. It is constructed using carvel planking with iron fastenings and believed to have been up to 32m in length. The vessel is believed to be a carrack of Mediterranean origin, likely Spanish. It has been interpreted as a trading vessel dating to the mid-sixteenth century. Artefacts from the site include stone shot, Italian ceramics, copper alloy scraps, pewter plates and spoons, a bronze mortar.

== Discovery and investigation ==
The site was found in 1984 while divers were searching for the source of Roman pottery that had been dredged up by local fishermen.

The site was further investigated in the mid-1980s and large portions of the wreck were recorded.

== Identity ==
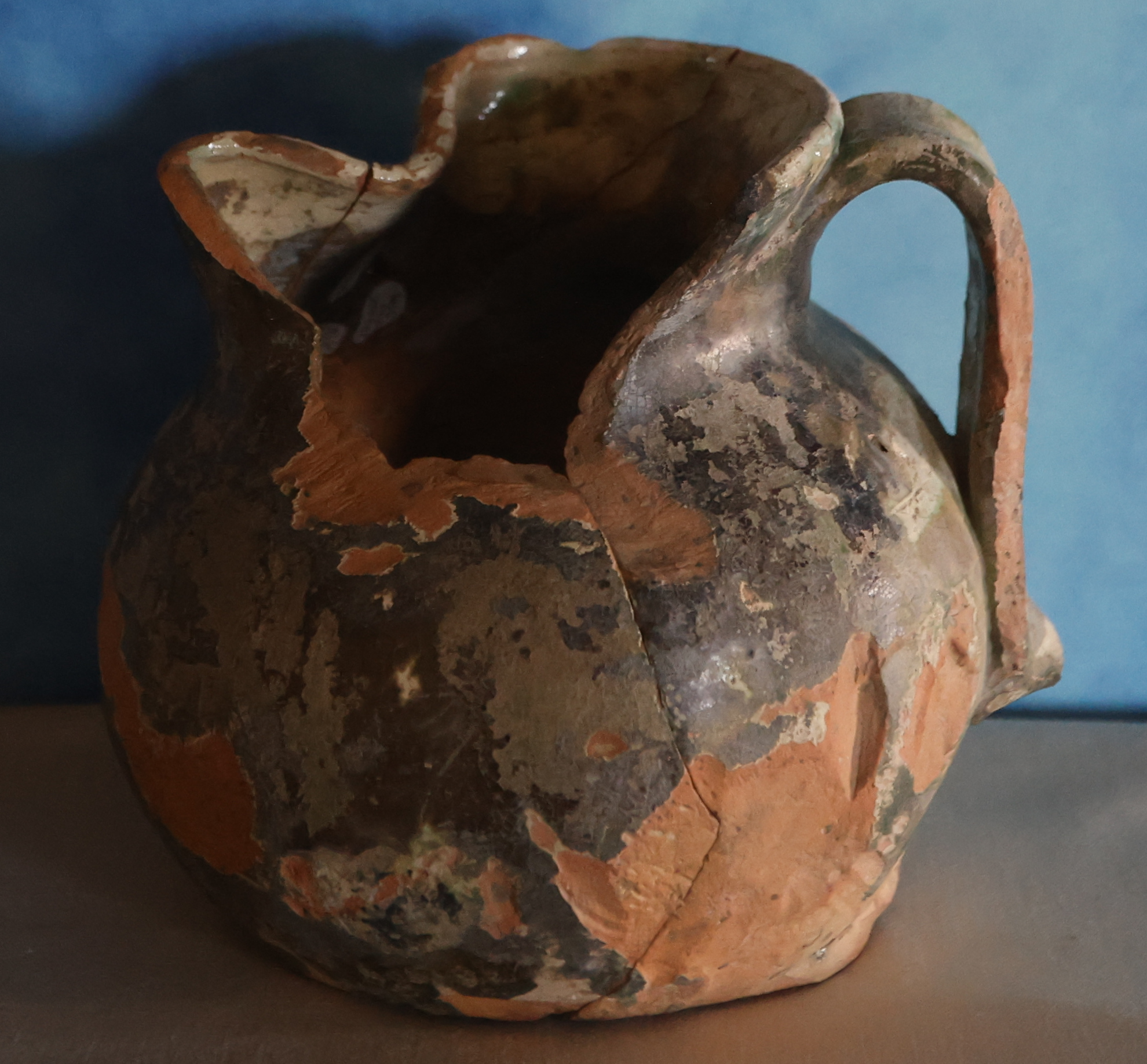
A northern Italian jug recovered from the wreck

The identity of the wreck is unknown, however, few vessels have been recorded as lost in this area and so there is only one documentary source that could be used to suggest an identity for the wreck. A petition by a Spanish Merchant to the High Court Admiralty in 1567 requested the return of salvaged wool from his vessel, the Santa Maria, lost off Yarmouth in 1567. This record may relate to the wreck, however, no archaeological evidence has been identified that confirms this.
