= Ferriby Boats =

Rare examples of British Bronze Age sewn-plank boats

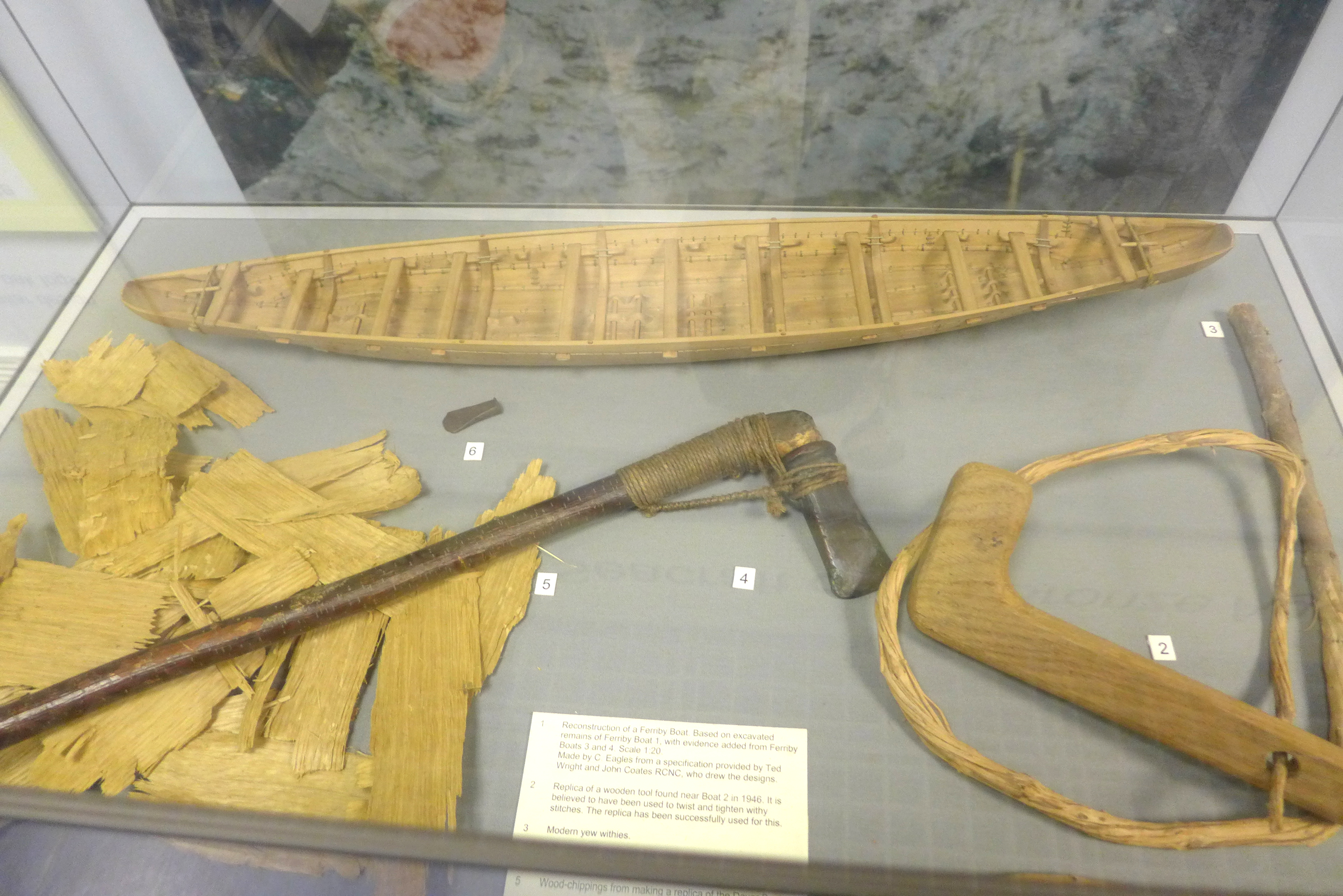
Ferriby boat model and replica tools in the Hull and East Riding Museum

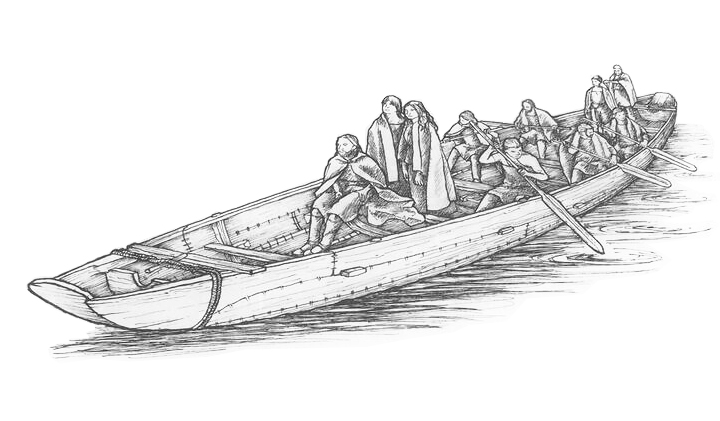
Reconstruction

The Ferriby Boats are three Bronze-Age British sewn plank-built boats, parts of which were discovered at North Ferriby in the East Riding of the English county of Yorkshire. Only a small number of boats of a similar period have been found in Britain and the Ferriby examples are the earliest known sewn-plank boats found in Europe, as well as the oldest known sewn-plank boats in the world outside of Egypt.

== History ==
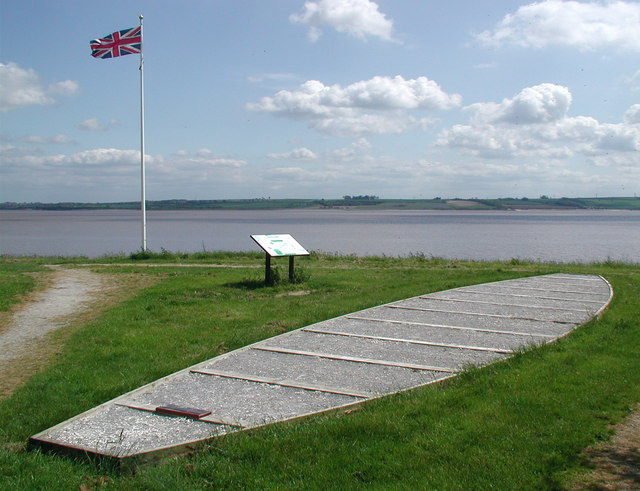
The site of the finding of the boats at Ferriby

Ferriby is on the edge of a major estuary into the North Sea, the Humber, so speculation has been made ever since their discovery about whether they went to sea and sailed to the Continent. There is plenty of evidence that there was cross-channel communication, but it is not known what kind of boats actually sailed across. Keith Miller, a regional archaeologist told the BBC that Ferriby boats would have been used to cross the North Sea, though by modern standards, such vessels as these are considered suitable only for sheltered waters. Nonetheless, the Ferriby Heritage Trust describe Ferriby Boat 3 as Europe's oldest known seacraft.

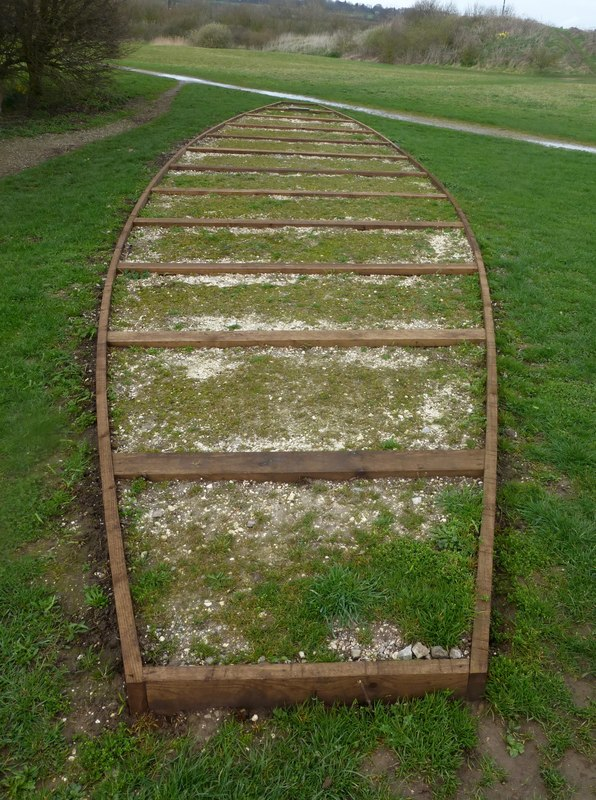
Outline of a Ferriby boat

The BBC television programme Operation Stonehenge: What Lies Beneath Pt 2, broadcast on BBC Two in September 2014, describes the boat as seagoing and describes the tons of cargo it could have taken across the Channel. However, the Dover Museum consider that the Dover Bronze Age Boat is the oldest seagoing boat known, at only 1550 BC, as the lack of a rocker bottom and pointed prow on the Ferriby boats is deemed by some to have made them too unstable for sea crossings. This is contested though: The Oakleaf reproduction of the Ferriby boats (pictured) was given a pointed bow and the Ferriby boats are described by the museum that houses them as having curved rocker bottoms, which qualifies them as similar to the later Dover boat in their seagoing abilities.

== Ferriby Boat 1 ==
In 1937, the first boat, known as Ferriby Boat 1 (or F1), was discovered by Ted and Will Wright, on the shore of the Humber. It was a boat bottom with one end almost complete. What remained was 5.7 feet (1.7 m) wide and over 43 feet (13.17 m) long, the planks mostly 3–4 inches (7.6–10.2 cm) thick. It was part of an oaken three-strake flat rockered-bottom boat which had been stitched together with yew withies, caulked with moss and capped with watertight oak laths. It has room for up to eighteen paddles and has been radiocarbon dated to between 1880 and 1680 BC.

== Ferriby Boat 2 ==
Sixty yards (54.9 m) upstream, Ted Wright found the end of a second boat-plank in 1940. This has become known as Ferriby Boat 2 (or F2). It is a twin-planked centre-strake dated to between 1940 and 1720 BC.

== Ferriby Boat 3 ==
In 1963, part of a third boat was discovered, again by Ted Wright, this time in the company of one of his sons, Roderick, and excavated adjoining Ferriby Boat 1. The remains consist of part of an outer bottom-strake and associated side-strake; many years later (in the late 1990s), scientists from Oxford were able to demonstrate that the third boat dated from as far back as 2030 BC, by the analysis of samples of the boat using accelerator mass spectrometry.

Ted Wright had formulated this theory much earlier, as set out in his book "The Ferriby Boats: Seacraft of the Bronze Age", published in 1990.

== Display ==
The original boats were excavated in 1946 and had to be cut up to be moved. They were housed in the Archaeological Gallery of the National Maritime Museum in Greenwich, but are now in the care of Hull Museums. Details concerning the boats can be found on an information board on Ferriby foreshore, on a public footpath that forms part of the Trans Pennine Trail.

== Replicas ==
Two different replicas have been made of the Ferriby Boats.

=== Oakleaf ===
In 2002-2003, Edwin Gifford and his team that included Richard Darrah built and sailed a half-size reconstruction of a Ferriby boat in Southampton. They have experimented with using a sail; although there is no evidence of a sail in the originals, they successfully rigged a square sail to Oakleaf. Oakleaf was then acquired by the Ferriby Heritage Trust in 2008, and it is now kept at Ferriby.

=== Morgawr ===
Morgawr reconstruction

In 2012–13, the Morgawr, a full-scale fully functional reconstruction (replica) of the Ferriby 1 boat, was built at the National Maritime Museum Cornwall in Falmouth, as a collaborative effort between the National Maritime Museum and the University of Exeter. Launched on 6 March 2013 into Falmouth Harbour, Morgawr was an experimental archaeology endeavour to learn about Bronze Age boat building techniques (replica bronze tools of the Age were used) and to test the nautical capabilities of the craft. On her maiden voyage, she was paddled by the volunteer builders. She was also crewed by a rowing club team, who tested her manoeuvrability and speed.

In 2014, having been in the water for many months, she was lifted out for her condition to be inspected and studied. As of 2016, she is on land, on display next to the Maritime Museum.

== Tree-Ring Research ==
In 1985 samples of the tree-rings of all three boats were examined. Measuring the ring-thicknesses needed to try to match other ring patterns proved difficult, partly because the boats were already treated. No actual dates were possible, but some information was obtained and the record of ring-thicknesses has been retained for future comparisons. The studies revealed that a pair of bottom strakes were split from the same trunk and that the trees for boats 1 and 2 were likely felled contemporaneously, despite the carbon-14 estimates which allow for a wider possible difference in age.

== See also ==
- Dover Bronze Age Boat
- Bell Beaker culture
