= HMS Regulus (1785) =

Fifth-rate of the Royal Navy

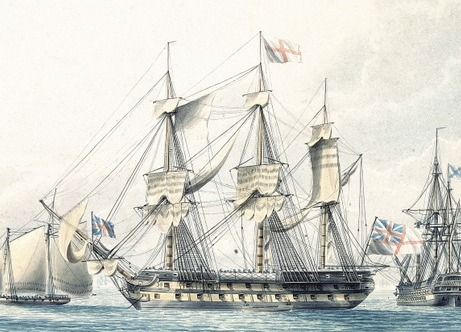
- Regulus's sister ship HMS Argo

History

United Kingdom
- Name: HMS Regulus
- Namesake: Regulus
- Ordered: 20 October 1780
- Builder: Thomas Raymond, Northam
- Cost: £16,223
- Laid down: June 1781
- Launched: 10 February 1785
- Completed: 10 March 1785
- Commissioned: February 1793
- Fate: Broken up March 1816

General characteristics
- Class & type: Roebuck-class fifth-rate
- Tons burthen: 888 77/94 (bm)
- Length: 140 ft 1 in (42.7 m) (gun deck); 115 ft 8 5/8 in (35.3 m) (keel)
- Beam: 38 ft (11.6 m)
- Depth of hold: 16 ft 4 in (5 m)
- Propulsion: Sails
- Complement: 155
- Armament: 1793: Lower deck: Nil; Upper deck: 22 × 12-pounder guns; Quarterdeck: 4 × 12-pounder guns; Forecastle: 2 × 6-pounder guns; 1804: Lower deck: 20 × 24-pounder carronades + 2 × 12-pounder guns; Upper deck: 24 × 18-pounder guns; Quarterdeck: 4 × 6-pounder guns; Forecastle: 2 × 6-pounder guns

HMS Regulus was a 44-gun fifth-rate Roebuck-class ship of the Royal Navy launched in 1785. Not commissioned until 1793 for the French Revolutionary Wars, Regulus served predominantly as a troop ship. After initial service in the English Channel she moved to the Jamaica Station where she saw action around Hispaniola and Puerto Rico. Returned to Britain in 1799, the ship served during the Egypt Campaign in 1801 and was present at the Battle of Abukir.

With the Napoleonic Wars underway, Regulus served as an escort to the transports for the Hanover Expedition in 1805. After periods of service in the North Sea, English Channel, and Mediterranean Sea, in 1814 she sailed to North America to participate in the War of 1812. Serving under George Cockburn in Chesapeake Bay, men from the ship were present at the destruction of the Chesapeake Bay Flotilla and Battle of Baltimore. Towards the end of the year Regulus served off Cumberland Island, participating in the Battle of Fort Peter and capturing St. Simons, Georgia. When the War of 1812 ended the ship was returned to Britain where she was broken up in 1816.

== Design ==
Regulus was a 44-gun, 18-pounder Roebuck-class ship. The class was a revival of the design used to construct the fifth-rate HMS Roebuck in 1769, by Sir Thomas Slade. The ships, while classified as fifth-rates, were not frigates because they carried two gun decks, of which a frigate would have only one. Roebuck was designed as such to provide the extra firepower a ship of two decks could bring to warfare but with a much lower draught and smaller profile. From 1751 to 1776 only two ships of this type were built for the Royal Navy because it was felt that they were anachronistic, with the lower (and more heavily armed) deck of guns being so low as to be unusable in anything but the calmest of waters. (Note: This problem was demonstrated in a sister ship of Regulus, HMS Argo, which two French frigates captured in 1783 because the weather was so bad she was not able to open her lower gun ports during the battle.) In the 1750s the cruising role of the 44-gun two deck ship was taken over by new 32- and 36-gun frigates, leaving the type almost completely obsolete.

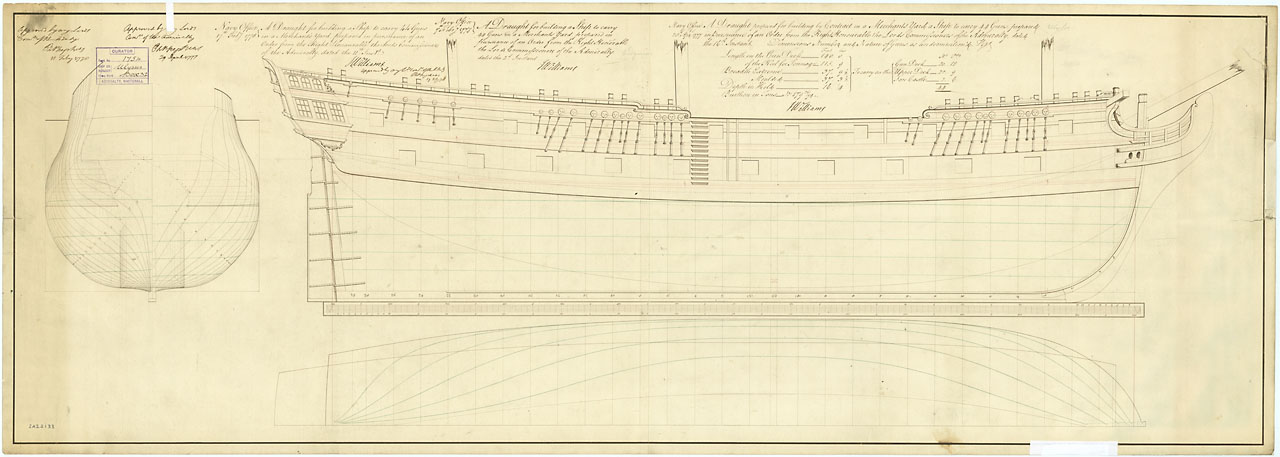
Plan of the Roebuck-class ships

When the American Revolutionary War began in 1775 a need was found for heavily armed ships that could fight in the shallow coastal waters of North America, where two-decked third-rates could not safely sail, and so the Roebuck class of nineteen ships, alongside the similar Adventure class, was ordered to the specifications of the original ships to fill this need. The frigate classes that had overtaken the 44-gun ship as the preferred design for cruisers were at this point still mostly armed with 9- and 12-pounder guns, and it was expected that the class's heavier 18-pounders would provide them with an advantage over these vessels. Frigates with larger armaments would go on to be built by the Royal Navy later on in the American Revolutionary War, but these ships were highly expensive and so Regulus and her brethren continued to be built as a cheaper alternative.

== Construction ==
Ships of the class built after 1782 received an updated armament, replacing small upper deck 9-pounder guns with more modern 12-pounders. All ships laid down after the first four of the class, including Regulus, had the double level of stern windows Roebuck had been designed with removed and replaced with a single level of windows, moving the style of the ships closer to that of a true frigate. (Note: While the earlier ships of the class had two levels of stern windows, there was only ever one level of cabins behind them.)

All but one ship of the class were contracted out to civilian dockyards for construction, and the contract for Regulus was given to Thomas Raymond at Northam in Devon. The ship was ordered on 20 October 1780 and laid down in June the following year. Raymond became bankrupt in November 1783 while the ship was still under construction, but continued the work on behalf of his creditors. Regulus was launched on 10 February 1785 with the following dimensions: 140 feet 1 inch (42.7 m) along the gun deck, 115 feet 8 5/8 inches (35.3 m) at the keel, with a beam of 38 feet (11.6 m) and a depth in the hold of 16 feet 4 inches (5 m). She measured 888 77/94 tons burthen. The fitting out process for Regulus was completed on 10 March at Portsmouth Dockyard. Her construction and fitting out cost in total £16,223.

Regulus, not immediately commissioned upon her completion, was armed in August 1793 as a troop ship. Her lower deck was left unarmed, with twenty-two 12-pounders on the upper deck. These were complemented by four 12-pounders on the quarterdeck and two 6-pounders on the forecastle. The ship was to have been crewed by 300 men, but as she was put into service as a troop ship her complement was lowered to 155. She was named after the bright star Regulus.

== Service ==
=== English Channel ===
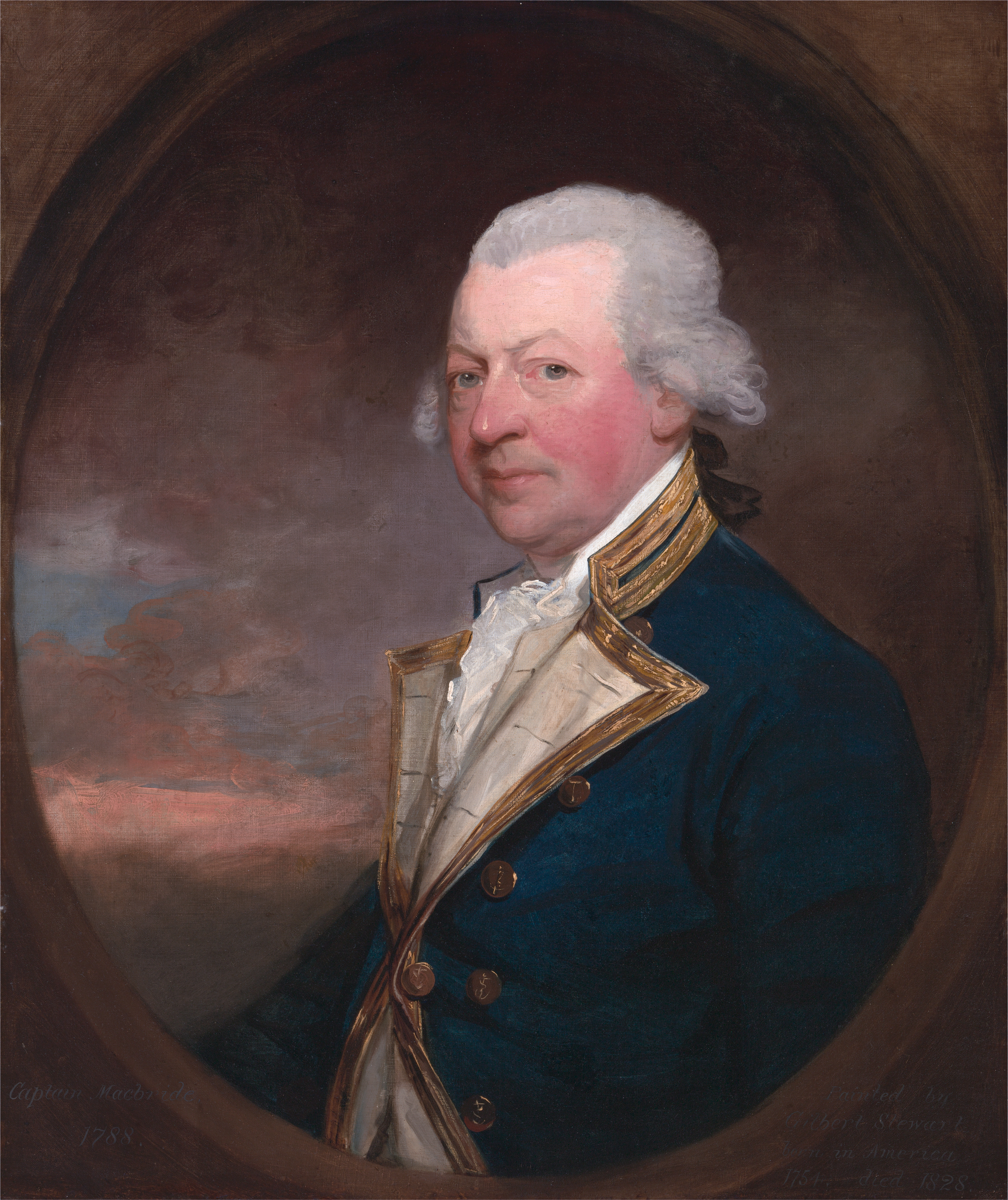
John Macbride used Regulus as his flagship during her first commission

The American Revolutionary War ended in 1783, while Regulus was still under construction. With the wartime necessity of using the obsolete ships as frontline warships now at an end, most ships of Regulus's type were taken out of service. While lacking modern fighting capabilities, the design still provided a fast ship, and so the Comptroller of the Navy, Sir Charles Middleton, pressed them into service as troop ships. Regulus spent five years in ordinary at Portsmouth before receiving a refit in June 1790. Nothing more was done to her until February 1793 when, with the French Revolutionary Wars beginning, the ship was commissioned by Commander James Hewett to serve as a troop ship.

Regulus joined the Channel Fleet, briefly serving in March as flagship to Rear-Admiral John Macbride who commanded a squadron of frigates in the Downs. Two months later Hewett was replaced in command by Commander Edward Bowater, under whom Regulus spent time serving on the Halifax Station. Captain George Oakes took command of the ship in January 1795, and on 7 February the ship shared with six other warships in the capture of the Dutch ship Zuyderberg.

=== Jamaica Station ===
Regulus sailed to join the Jamaica Station in March the same year. The ship returned to Britain in May 1796 and spent the next three months in refit at Plymouth Dockyard, costing £8,729. At this point Captain William Carthew replaced Oakes in command, sailing Regulus to return to Jamaica on 23 October. She was armed en flute throughout this period. The ship captured the Spanish 18-gun corvette San Pio in the Atlantic Ocean on 2 November whilst making her journey, having fired a broadside into the Spanish vessel when she refused to identify herself. Having joined the Jamaica Station, on 6 April 1797 boats from Regulus and the 36-gun frigate HMS Magicienne raided Cape Roxo, Hispaniola. The harbour there was a haven for French privateers, and without taking any casualties the boats destroyed two gun batteries and captured or burned a group of thirteen ships.

Joined by the 18-gun sloop HMS Fortune, on 22 April Regulus and Magicienne rounded the Tiburon Peninsula into Carcasse Bay, where they discovered a French privateer sloop and four merchant schooners. Hearing an alarm bell sound and believing it meant that the French were attacking the nearby British-held Les Irois, the ships sailed into the bay. Being fired upon by a French gun battery near the shore, Regulus and Magicienne returned fire and forced the French to abandon their guns and flee inland. The squadron then captured the four merchant ships, laden with supplies for a siege. The British loss was four killed and ten wounded, all from one of Magicienne's boats that had attempted to tow the privateer sloop away from the battery.

Captain George Eyre assumed command of Regulus at some point after this engagement. Beginning a period of successful prize taking, on 7 July 1798 Regulus captured the French 4-gun privateer Pouline. Four days later the ship was patrolling off Puerto Rico when she came across five ships in Aguada Bay. They were anchored under the protection of several gun batteries. Eyre (Note: The London Gazette reporting on the attack instead records that Carthew was still in command of Regulus.) sent in Regulus's boats under the command of two lieutenants, supported by a schooner he had already captured, to attack the ships. As the boats went in Eyre found that the wind was so poor that neither Regulus nor the schooner could sail in to support the assault. The boats made the attack despite this, and captured all five ships whilst under enemy fire. The lack of wind forced the crews to abandon two of their prizes, bringing the other three out of the bay at the cost of one man who was killed by grapeshot. The vessels captured were a ship, brig, and an armed schooner. Regulus went on to capture the ship La Rosa on 7 October.

Serving alongside the 18-gun brig-sloop HMS Swallow, on 13 January 1799 Regulus captured the Spanish brig Carmini. In June the ship's boats captured a small privateer at Riohacha. Regulus returned to Britain in October, conveying Vice-Admiral Richard Rodney Bligh.

=== Egypt and Hanover ===
Regulus was fitted again as a troop ship at Woolwich Dockyard. The work was started in December, with Regulus paid off in January 1800 and the work completed in March. It cost £7,543 and included the addition of a poop deck.

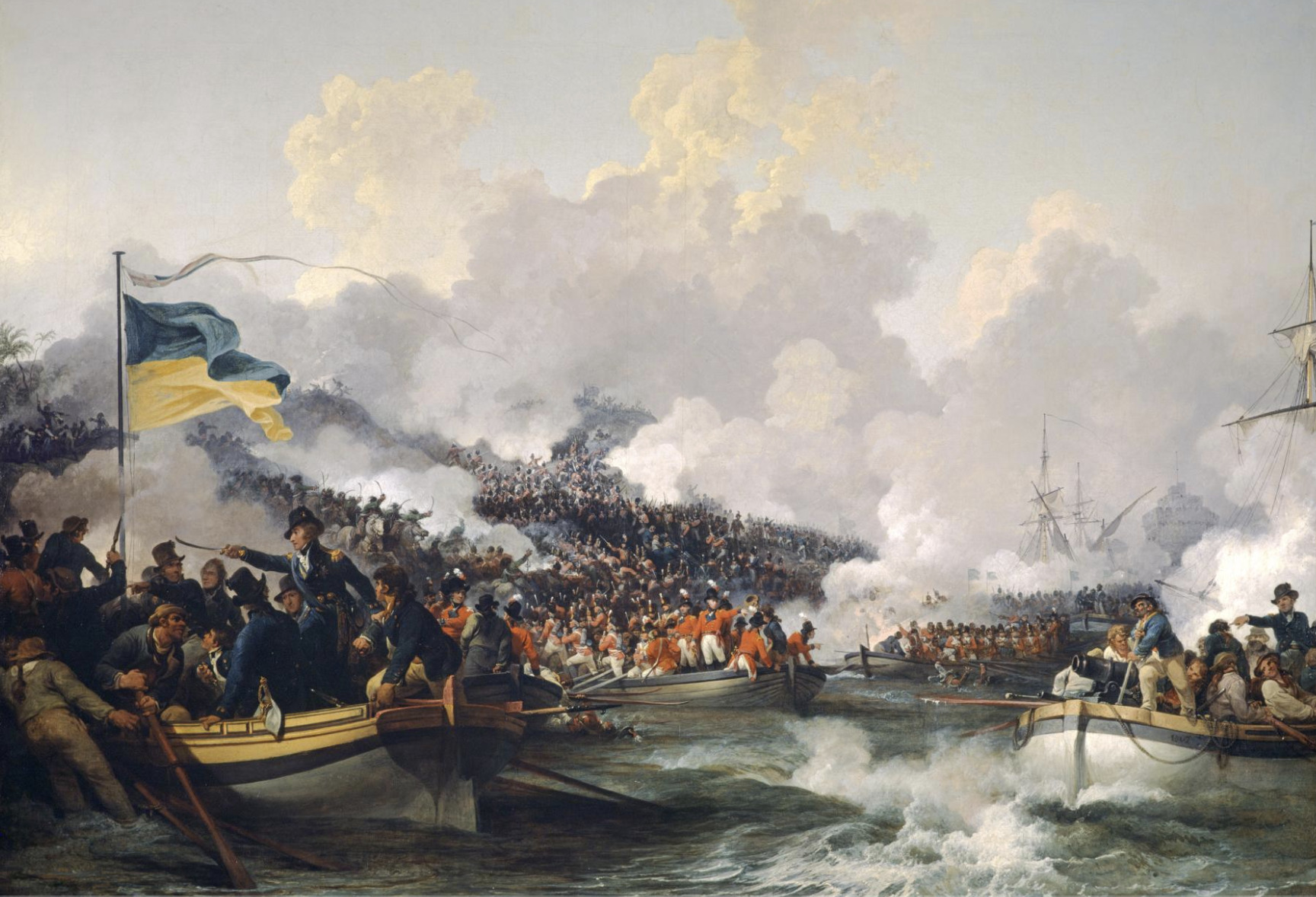
The Landing of British Troops at Aboukir by Philip James de Loutherbourg. Regulus's boats participated in the Battle of Abukir

Regulus was recommissioned by Commander Thomas Pressland in February; the ship then formed part of the transport fleet that sailed to the Mediterranean for the Egypt Campaign in October. By January 1801 the force was rehearsing at Marmaris for the amphibious invasion of Abu Qir. The troops Regulus carried were not used in the subsequent assault at the Battle of Abukir on 8 March, but her boats were loaned to another troop ship. One Regulus seaman was killed and another wounded during the successful attack. Regulus continued to participate in Egyptian operations, with Pressland for several months commanding all of the Greek vessels in use by the fleet.

The ship returned to Britain in 1802. Commander Nicholas Kempe was in temporary control of Regulus between February and July, before ceding command back to Pressland. With the Napoleonic Wars having begun, the ship was refitted at Chatham Dockyard between December 1803, when Pressland left Regulus for a final time, and April 1804. Her armament was changed in June, being replaced by twenty 24-pounder carronades on the lower deck alongside two 12-pounder guns, with twenty-four 18-pounders on the upper deck. There were four 6-pounders on the quarterdeck and two more on the forecastle.

Having been recommissioned under Captain Charles Boys, on 15 September Regulus was one of eight ships that were present at the capture of Flora de Lisboa off the coast of Le Havre. She then shared with seven other vessels in the capture of the Spanish ship Purissima Conception on 6 October. On 10 December 1805 Regulus formed part of the escort to the troop ships taking men to join the Hanover Expedition. Hit by a severe gale, Regulus and the majority of the fleet aborted the journey and returned to the Downs. Several troop ships were wrecked off the French and Dutch coasts in the following days. On 22 December the ships left the Downs for another attempt at Hanover, but continued to suffer in the poor weather conditions. Having reached Den Helder on 24 December, the troop ship Helder was wrecked there with 600 soldiers on board. Regulus sent in her boats to attempt a rescue, but was unable to complete this before the entire force was captured by the Dutch on land.

Regulus continued to serve in the North Sea and English Channel until 1807 when she was transferred to the Channel Islands. Boys left Regulus in May the same year, after which the ship was placed in ordinary at Chatham. In May 1808 she was converted into a provisions depot, armed with eighteen 9-pounders on her upper deck and four 6-pounders on the quarterdeck. From August Regulus went under a large repair, being converted back into a troop ship.

Work was completed in June 1810 with the ship recommissioned by Commander John Hudson, who was replaced by Commander John Tailour in November. Under Tailour Regulus conveyed troops to Lisbon in 1811 and in the Mediterranean Sea in 1813, recapturing the brig Fly on 11 September that year. Tailour was promoted out of the ship on 26 October and replaced in November by Commander Robert Ramsay.

=== North America ===
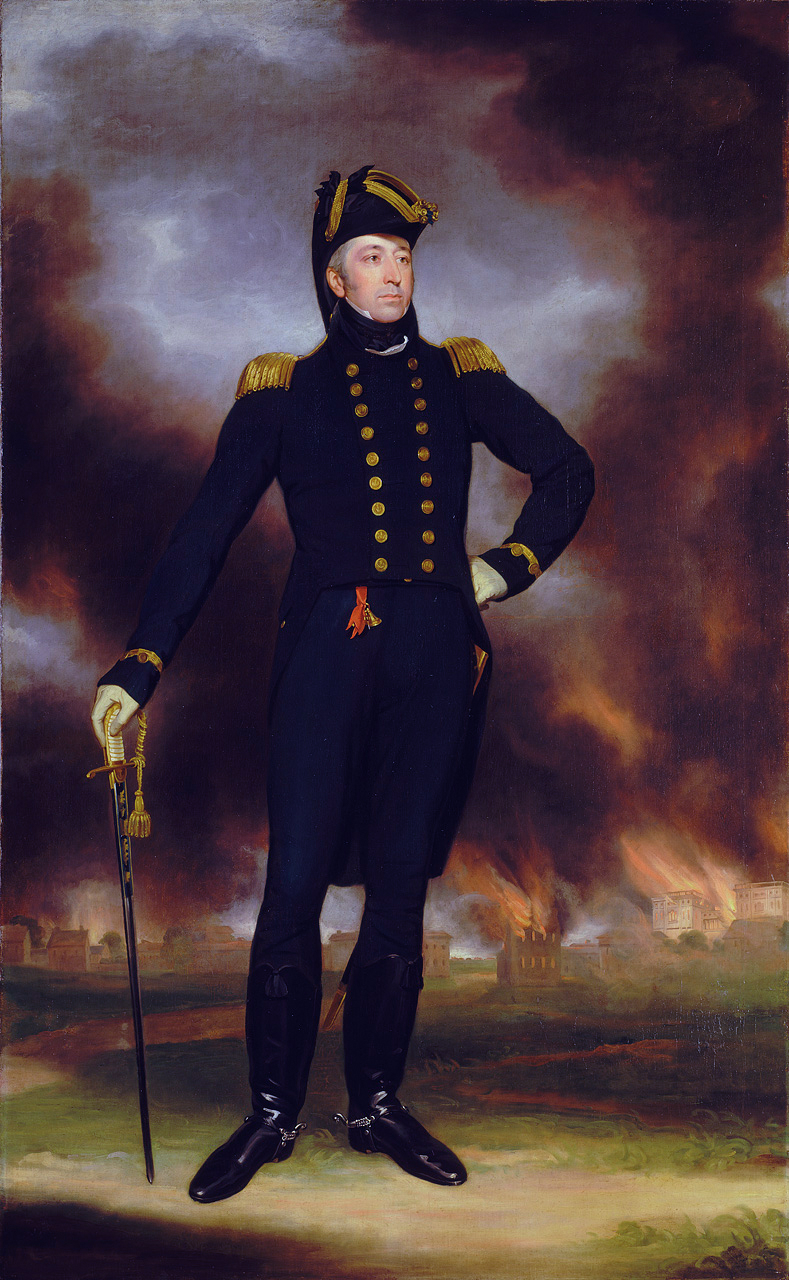
Portrait of George Cockburn by John James Halls. Regulus served under George Cockburn during the War of 1812

After initially serving in the North Sea under Ramsay, on 7 April 1814 Regulus sailed to North America to participate in the War of 1812. Conveying a battalion of Royal Marines, the ship first travelled to Bermuda, arriving on 9 June. After several weeks spent acclimatising on the island, Regulus formed part of a convoy that took the marines to join the command of Rear-Admiral George Cockburn, employed in attacks in Chesapeake Bay. The ships reached Cockburn on 15 July. Commander John Curran possibly took temporary command of the ship for part of the year. Under Ramsay, the ship's boats participated in several operations, including on 22 August when he commanded a division of boats under Cockburn which, travelling up the Patuxent River, forced the Chesapeake Bay Flotilla to destroy itself.

Working to support the British Army advance towards Washington, D.C., the next day Ramsay took his boats up the Patuxent to Upper Marlboro, Maryland. From there he provided supplies to the army, and on 12 September commanded a division of seamen in the defeat at the Battle of Baltimore. Regulus continued operations in the Chesapeake, evacuating two marine battalions from Tangier Island on 11 December. Cockburn left the Chesapeake with most of his force on 14 December, sailing for Amelia Island to complete a diversionary attack for the Gulf Campaign. Regulus was left behind as part of a small squadron under Captain Robert Barrie, which followed Cockburn some days later. On 10 January 1815 the squadron reached Cumberland Island, separated from Amelia Island by Cumberland Sound.

With the plan to move in land and attack St. Marys, Georgia, the force looked to secure the route along St. Marys River. On 13 January Barrie, commanding a force of 700 seamen and marines, attacked and captured the foremost American defensive position, Fort Peter, in the Battle of Fort Peter. On the following day the British advanced up river to St. Marys which, undefended, was taken. A further advance then re-captured the East Indiaman Countess of Harcourt. On 22 January Fort Peter was slighted and the British moved back out to sea, garrisoning Cumberland Island. Ramsay then commanded a force, made up of Regulus, the 12-gun gun-brig HMS Manly, and the 16-gun schooner HMS Canso, which on 30 January peacefully captured the island of St. Simons, Georgia, and Fort Frederica. Ramsay continued on St. Simons for some time, seizing goods and recruiting slaves from the plantations.

Cockburn kept his force at Cumberland Island, planning an attack on Savannah, Georgia, before on 25 February news arrived that the war had ended. In March a party of Americans, including the politician Thomas Spalding, who was a resident of nearby Sapelo Island, came to Cockburn demanding the return of their slaves. Cockburn agreed to return only those who had been freed after the ratification of the Treaty of Ghent on 17 February. Spalding and Thomas M. Newell were allowed to address a crowd of several hundred ex-slaves stood on the deck of Regulus, pleading for their return. Only thirteen did so, with the ships taking the rest to Bermuda and then on to Halifax, Nova Scotia.

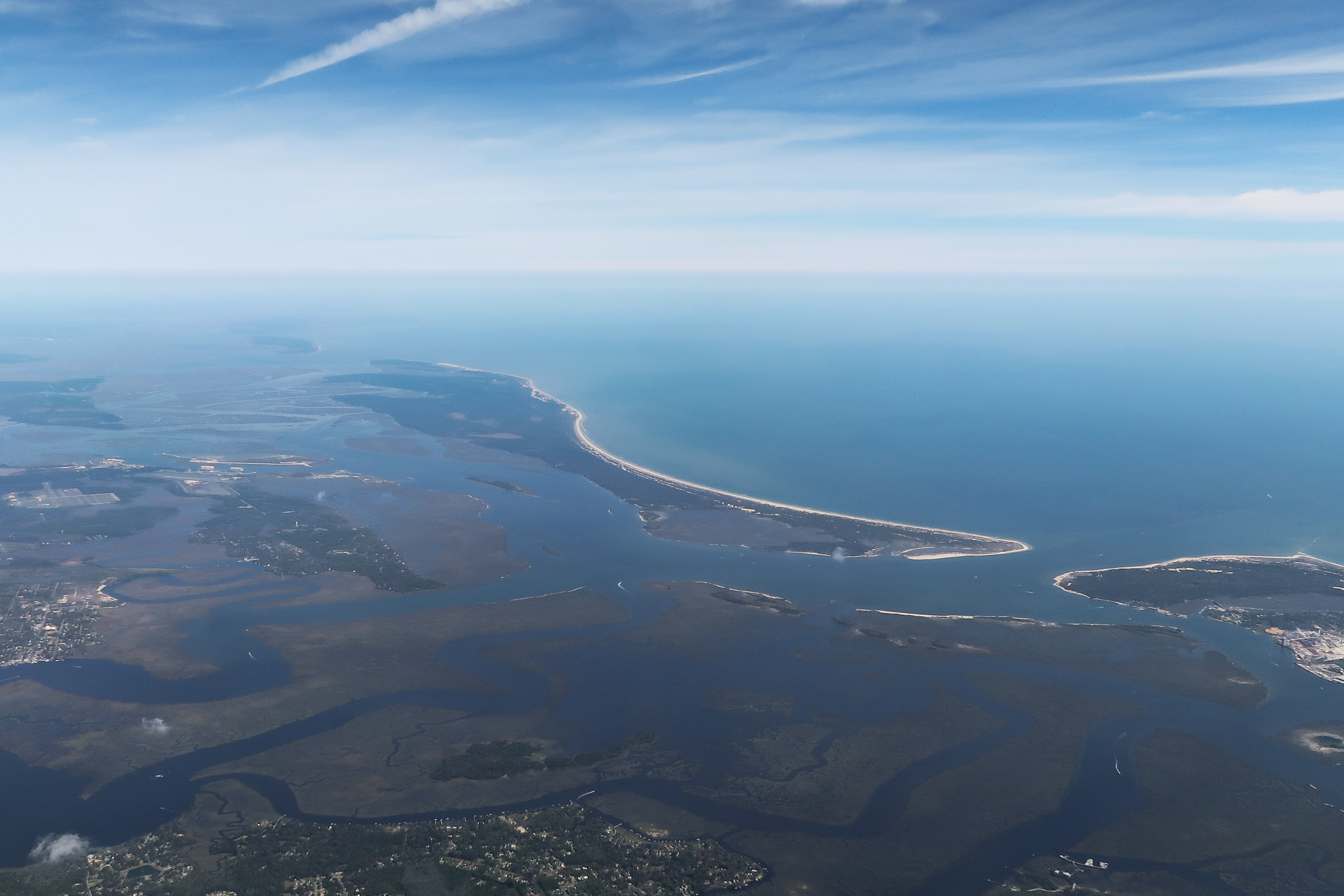
Cumberland Island, where Regulus was serving when the War of 1812 ended

Promoted on 9 April, Ramsay was replaced in Regulus by Commander George Truscott. On 6 August 1815, she was moored in Murray's Anchorage alongside HMS Carron and HMS Dominica, and rode out a destructive gale that hit Bermuda. With the War of 1812 and Napoleonic Wars over, Regulus returned to Portsmouth on 3 October 1815. She was broken up at Sheerness Dockyard in March 1816.
