= Nourrice (1792 ship) =

History

France
- Name: Nourrice
- Namesake: Nursemaid, wet nurse or child-minder
- Builder: Bayonne
- Laid down: February 1790
- Launched: August 1792
- Fate: Destroyed May 1811

General characteristics (Note: All British measurements are those for Nourrice's sister ship, Prevoyante.)
- Displacement: 1,200 tons (French)
- Tons burthen: 80415/94 (bm)
- Length: 143 ft 0 in (43.59 m) (overall);121 ft 110 1/2 in (39.688 m) (keel)
- Beam: 35 ft 2 1/2 in (10.732 m)
- Depth of hold: 13 ft 40 in (4.98 m)
- Propulsion: Sails
- Complement: 100-194
- Armament: Lower gundeck:10 gunports but not armed; Upper gundeck:24 × 8-pounder guns initially; Post-1801: 22 × 8-pounder guns + 2 × 6-pounder guns; Post 1807: 24 × 6-pounder guns

Nourrice was the first of two flûtes (supply ships) built to a design by Raymond-Antoine Haran. She was launched on 3 August 1792 at Bayonne and coppered in 1795. She served at Brest and Toulon, (Note: Her sister ship was the Prévoyante, which the British captured in 1795 and converted to a fifth rate frigate.) until a British squadron cornered her in the Bay of Sagone on Corsica's east coast in 1811 and destroyed her.

== French service ==
Nourrice served as a transport and there exist some reports of particular voyages or periods of service.

- Between August and November 1792 she was under the command of lieutenant de vaisseau Minbielle. She carried timber for naval construction from Bayonne to Rochefort and then returned to Bayonne.
- Between January and July 1793 she was under the command of capitaine de vaisseau Gauthier. He sailed her from Rochefort to Pauillac.
- In Prairial Year 10 (approx. May 1802), enseigne de vaisseau Pallois sailed her from Rochefort to Port-au-Prince, carrying troops and supplies.
- From Pluviôse to Floréal Year 11 (approx. January to May 1803), Nourrice transported troops from Genoa to Elba, while under the command of lieutenant de vaisseau Vatel.
- From Nivôse Year 12 to Brumaire Year 13 (approx. December 1804 to October 1805), she was still under Vatel's command. She made several voyages, carrying troops from Toulon to Corsica via Golfe-Juan. Next she was at Villefranche, and then she carried passengers, artillery, and funds from Toulon to Genoa and San Fiorenzo, Corsica.

== Fate (British Account) ==
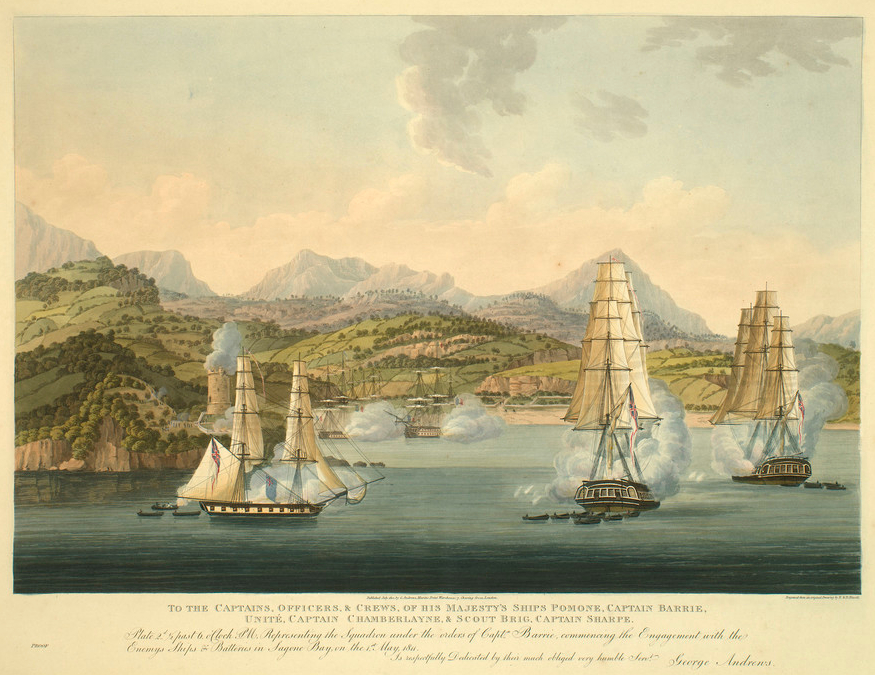
Giraffe and Nourrice (far centre) caught fire, at Sagone Bay, 1811

On 30 April 1811, Nourrice, the 26-gun Girafe, and an armed merchant vessel, were anchored in the Bay of Sagone on Corsica's east coast. They were laden with wood for the naval arsenal at Toulon and had taken refuge under the protection of a shore battery of four guns and a mortar, a Martello tower armed with a gun overlooking the battery, and some 200 troops with field pieces, assisted by armed local inhabitants, all on a heights overlooking the vessels. Here the British ships Pomone, Unite, and Scout found them. The next day Captain Robert Barrie of Pomone had boats from Pomone and Scout tow their ships close to the French vessels. After a 90-minute exchange of fire, Giraffe and Nourrice caught fire.{{Giraffe had been built at La Ciotat and launched in 1809.}} Brands from Nourrice set fire to the merchant vessel.

Barrie had the British withdraw, awaiting the explosion of the French vessels. The battery and the tower fell silent. Shortly thereafter the Giraffe exploded, and then so did Nourrice. Some of the timbers from Nourrice fell on the tower, demolishing it, with further sparks setting fire to the shore battery, which also blew up. With nothing left to accomplish, the British withdrew. The action cost the British two men killed and 25 wounded.

== Fate (French account) & subsequent developments ==
French accounts report that their crews set Girafe and Nourrice on fire, and then abandoned their vessels. The armed merchant vessel was the Henriette, and her crew ran her ashore. A police report states that French casualties were four gunners and two sailors killed, and 30 men wounded. The subsequent court martial acquitted their two captains, lieutenants de vaisseau Renault and Figanière.

== Postscript ==
The wreck of the Giraffe was found in 1983. That of Nourrice was found in 2007 in front of the port as a result of a project to build a new port.
