= Battle of Fort Peter =

War of 1812 battle

- Part of War of 1812
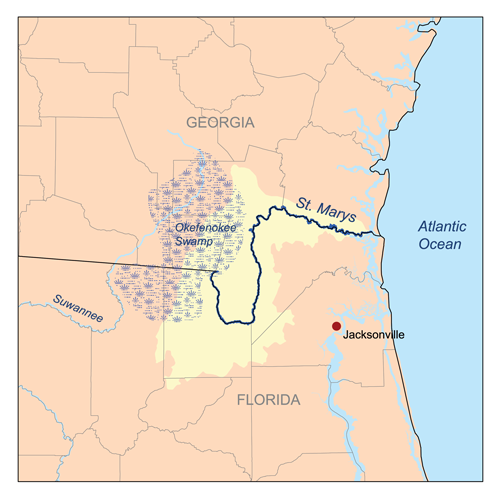
- St. Marys River
Date	13–14 January 1815
Location	Fort Peter, St. Marys, Camden County, Georgia 30°45′25″N 81°31′0″W
Result	British victory: Fort Peter destroyed.

Belligerents
British Empire	United States

Commanders and leaders
Land: unknown Sea: George Cockburn	Abraham A. Massias; Daniel Newnan

Strength
Land: 1,500 unknown artillery Sea: 1 Third Rate; 1 Fourth Rate; 4 Fifth Rates; 2 bomb ketches 2 schooners (Note: The vessels were: Albion, Dragon (1798) (74-guns), Regulus (1785) (44 guns; en flute), Brune (56 guns; en flute), Severn (1813) (40 guns), Hebrus (36 guns), Rota (38 guns), Primrose (18 guns), Terror (1813) and Devastation (both bomb vessels of 8 guns), and the schooners Canso (10 guns) and Whiting (1812) (12 guns).)	Land: 160; 8 guns Sea: 2 gunboats

Casualties and losses
3 killed 5 wounded	1 killed 4 wounded 9 missing 8 guns captured 2 gunboats captured 12 merchantmen captured

The Battle of Fort Point Peter was a successful attack in early 1815 by a British force on a smaller American force on the Georgia side of the St. Marys River near St. Marys, Georgia. The river was then part of the international border between the United States and British-allied Spanish Florida; it now forms part of the boundary between Georgia and Florida. Occupying coastal Camden County allowed the British to blockade American transportation on the Intracoastal Waterway. The attack on Forts St. Tammany and Peter occurred in January 1815, after the signing of the Treaty of Ghent, which would end the War of 1812, but before the treaty's ratification. The attack occurred at the same time as the attack on Fort St. Philip in Louisiana and was part of the British occupation of St. Marys and Cumberland Island.

== Forts at St. Marys ==
Point Peter is the first landing site on the Georgia side of the St. Marys River. It is a peninsula between the North River and Point Peter Creek, which flow into the St. Marys River. James Seagrove and Jacob Weed received land grants nearby in 1787, and a military post was established on Point Peter around that time. In July 1794 Paul Hyacinth Perrault was commissioned to build a fort in St. Marys, probably Ft. St. Tammany. The following year, costs exceeded $1,400. The War Department approved payments relating to the fort in 1797 and 1800. The garrison eventually included a fort, battery, and a mooring for naval vessels, and may also have been known as Fort Gunn in 1794.

United States military posted at Point Peter were responsible for enforcing tariffs and protecting the nation's southern border with Spanish Florida. The fort became involved in the Quasi-War in 1798. Between 1793 and 1805, United States military manned the fort, and $16,000 was spent on the Point Peter garrison. However, by 1806 the fort was at least partially dismantled, and defenses relied instead solely on gunboats and a fixed battery, which might have contributed to the July 1805 St. Marys River incident involving British naval personnel and successive French and Spanish privateers. In 1809, the block house and battery that formed the new American fort were approved.

=== 1810–1814 ===
In 1811, eleven of the United States Navy's 165 gunboats were stationed at St. Marys, making it the third-largest naval station in the United States prior to the War of 1812. The gunboats were powered by lateen sails and oars, and mounted heavy guns.

In 1811, the commander of Fort Point Peter, Lt. Col. Thomas Adam Smith, and his junior officers, Captain Abraham Massias, Captain Joseph Woodruff, Lieutenant Daniel Appling, Captain Fiedler Ridgeway, and Lieutenant Elias Stallings, received orders to assist an American takeover of Spanish Florida if a rebellion or invasion took place. However, few officers became involved in the Patriot War of East Florida over the next few years. President Madison and Secretary of State Monroe never gave direct orders to the Point Peter garrison to act in that conflict, unlike the later orders in the War of 1812.

In the fall of 1812, the Camden County Battalion was raised at Point Peter. It served in the 1st Brigade of General John Floyd's army division, which participated in the Creek Wars.

== Battle of Fort Point Peter 1815 ==
On January 10, 1815, British forces under the command of Admiral Sir George Cockburn landed on Cumberland Island off the Georgia coast. The British force consisted of the three Royal Marines Battalions (560 men in the 1st & 2nd, plus the six companies of the 3rd), ships' detachments of Royal Marines from the squadron (120 men), and two companies from the 2nd West India Regiment from The Bahamas (190 men). (Note: One source reports a deployment (from the force) of Captain Wills with 150 men of the 1st Battalion. In addition, Lieutenant Fraser with a company of the 2nd Battalion, and Lieutenant Agassiz with a company of the 3rd Battalion, and a company of the 2nd West India Regiment amounted to 160 men.) Commander Robert Ramsay of the Regulus participated in a variety of expeditions on the coast off Georgia, where he commanded the force that captured the town of Frederica and the island of St. Simon’s.

On January 13 a British force first bombarded Fort Peter and then landed on Point Peter by the town of St. Marys. Barrie disembarked on the 13th in close proximity to the fort. The British attacked and took the fort without suffering any casualties.

The British land force then headed for St. Marys. On their way, they encountered a small American force of 160 soldiers of the 43rd Infantry Regiment and the Rifle Corps under Captain Abraham A. Massias. A skirmish ensued before the Americans retreated. Massias estimated the size of the British force as 1500 men. He reported that American casualties on 13 January included 1 killed, 4 wounded, and 9 missing. Although Massias believed that British suffered numerous casualties, they reported only three men killed and five wounded in the entire expedition.

On January 15 the British captured St. Marys despite Fort St. Tammany just outside the town. American reports suggest that the British looted the town's jewelry store and stole fine china and other goods from the residents. British reports are that the town's inhabitants agreed to terms under which residents gave up all public property and British troops respected all private property. British forces captured two American gunboats and 12 merchantmen, including the East Indiaman Countess of Harcourt, which the American privateer Sabine had captured as Countess of Harcourt was on her way from London to Isle of France (Mauritius). Prize money for Countess of Harcourt, the bark Maria Theresa, goods from the ship Carl Gustaff, and the schooner Cooler, was paid in April 1824. (Note: A first-class share of the prize money was worth £17 2s 0½d; a sixth-class share was worth 3s 6¼d.)

In January 1815 Ross, while commanding the Albion conducted a boat expedition up St. Marys River, Georgia, before returning to Cumberland Island, with a ship loaded with timber, and an English East Indiaman which had been captured by an American privateer. He also embarked all the produce collected at the town of St. Mary's in the vessels taken there by Captain Barrie, blew up the fort on Point Peter and a battery (mounting six 24-pounders and two brass 6-pounders) and destroyed the barracks and storehouses, together with some merchandise and guns that were not deemed fit to bring away. Captains Barrie and Ross were accompanied by Badcock of the Brune, contributing to the neutralisation of the enemy’s defences on the coast of Georgia.

Cockburn kept his force at Cumberland Island, planning an attack on Savannah, Georgia, before on 25 February news arrived that the war had ended.

The British ended their occupation of St. Marys and Fort St. Tammany after about a week. They burned Fort Point Peter, including its blockhouses and barracks, and withdrew to Cumberland Island. The officers lived at Dungeness, the former mansion of the widow of deceased Revolutionary war hero General Nathanael Greene. Most British troops were stationed at the island's south end, and the British ships anchored in Cumberland sound.

At the end of February 1815, Rear Admiral Cockburn received news of the Treaty of Ghent through newspapers, but refused to accept such as official proof and continued to ship refugees away from Florida and Georgia. In all, the British aided the emigration of an estimated 1,700 slaves from southeast Georgia. Cockburn agreed to return only those who had been freed after the ratification of the Treaty of Ghent on 17 February. Spalding and Thomas M. Newell were allowed to address a crowd of several hundred ex-slaves stood on the deck of Regulus, pleading for their return. Only thirteen did so, with the ships taking the rest to Bermuda and then on to Halifax, Nova Scotia.

The British departed from Cumberland Island on March 15, although a ship stuck on a sandbar and Albion remained in Cumberland Sound until March 18.

== Point Peter 1815–1821 ==
In 1818, the federal government purchased the land. In 1819, the Adams–Onís Treaty was signed, and Florida was transferred to the United States in 1821.

By the Civil War, Fort Point Peter had become a ruin. In 1870, Daniel Proctor purchased the property from the United States, who sold it to Alexander Curtis.

== Present day ==
In 1953, Georgia placed a historical marker at the Point Peter battlefield. In 2002, a planned housing development at Point Peter spurred archaeological interest in the former forts. The developer, required to survey the cultural resources being disturbed, hired Scott Butler (an archaeologist for Brockington and Associates) to conduct a study. As of 2009, archaeologists had found thousands of artifacts, including cannons, muskets, musket balls, knives, and uniform buttons.

Fort St. Tammany, the fort in St. Marys, was located where Howard Gilman Memorial Waterfront Park is today. It is identified as Georgia Archaeological Site 9Cm164; to date there has been no detailed study of the ruins.

The Cumberland Island National Seashore Museum in downtown St. Marys has opened a semi-permanent exhibit, "The Forgotten Invasion", in remembrance of the battle. The exhibit includes a recovered sunken anchor from a British warship in addition to finds from Scott Butler's excavation.

== See also ==
- St. Marys Historic District (Georgia)

History of Camden County, Georgia

- War of 1812
- Seminole Wars
- Republic of East Florida
