= HMS Assurance (1747) =

Frigate of the Royal Navy

Coordinates: 50.6627°N 1.5873°W

History

Great Britain
- Name: HMS Assurance
- Launched: 1747
- Fate: Wrecked, 1753

General characteristics
- Armament: 44 guns

HMS Assurance was a 44-gun fifth rate frigate of the Royal Navy, launched in 1747. She was wrecked off The Needles near the Isle of Wight, England in 1753, and remained stuck on the rock long enough for her crew and passengers to escape.

The shipwreck site identified at the Needles contains the remains of two wrecks, thought to be the Assurance and Pomone. It was designated under the Protection of Wrecks Act on 4 April 1974 and is a Protected Wreck managed by Historic England. The designation lists the date of sinking as 1738, although research by the John Bingeman (licensee from 1978) from the court martial accounts indicates that the wreck occurred in 1753.

The wreck site was identified by an Isle of Wight resident, Derek Williams, who became the first licensee. It includes cannons and other metallic items from the ship.
