= Hercules (1796 ship) =

British merchant ship 1796-1815

History

Great Britain
- Name: Hercules
- Namesake: Hercules
- Launched: 1796, or 1797, Bristol
- Captured: 21 February 1814

General characteristics
- Tons burthen: Originally: 322 (bm); 1810 (after lengthening): 411, or 412 (bm)

Hercules was launched at Bristol in 1796 as a West Indiaman. In 1815, a United States privateer captured her, but the Royal Navy recaptured her. Because the recapture occurred after 1 March 1815, she was returned to the United States.

== Career ==
Hercules first appeared in Lloyd's Register (LR) in 1796.

Year	Master	Owner	Trade	Source & notes
1796	J.Powell	Protheroe	Bristol–Jamaica	LR
1809	F.Gay	F.Fisher	Bristol–Jamaica	LR
1811	F.Gay; James Rae	F.Fisher	Bristol–Jamaica	LR; lengthening and good repairs, 1809 & 1810
1815	James Rae	F.Fisher	Bristol–St. Vincent	LR; lengthening and good repairs, 1809 & 1810

== Fate ==
On 9 February 1815 Hercules, Rae, master, passed Tenerife in company with Josephine, Gillies, master. Hercules was on her way from Bristol to Jamaica, and Josephine was on her way from Liverpool to St Lucia. They had parted from the West Indies convoy on 29 January in a gale.

On 24 February 1815, the United States letter of marque Hollins, of 10 guns and 70 men, captured Hercules at 13°6′N 57°46′W, some 112 mi (180 km) east of Barbados. Hollins took out part of Hercules's cargo and stores and sent her to America. Rae and his crew arrived at Grenada on 5 March. (Note: Hollins, of 224 tons (bm), was a schooner on her third cruise. Captain Moss J.Stockett had commissioned her on 27 December 1814. She had taken three prizes, only one of which returned to the United States. One prize was the schooner Ben Bovil, which Hollins had burnt. She may have captured Ben Bovill (or Ben Bovell), on 24 February, the same day that she captured Hercules. Earlier, on 9 February, she had captured the sloop Sally. She had first been commissioned at Baltimore on 11 December 1813. One prize entered a U.S. port, carrying prize cargo in her hold. Holins made her expenses. She was lost at sea in 1816.)

The schooner HMS Canso recaptured Hercules off Abacco on 9 March, and reportedly sent her to Halifax.

Hercules arrived at Nassau. There she was to be returned to the Americans.

All British vessels American vessels had captured prior to 1 March and still in American possession after that date were returned to them, even if the vessels had been recaptured after 1 March. The reason was that the Treaty of Ghent, which ended the War of 1812 between the United Kingdom and the United States, took effect on 1 March. Therefore, any vessel that the Americans had captured before March 1, i.e., during wartime, such as Hercules, was a valid prize, and a vessel recaptured after 1 March, such as Hercules, was recaptured during peacetime, and so not a valid prize.
