= HMS Pictou (1813) =

History

United Kingdom
- Name: HMS Pictou
- Namesake: Pictou, Nova Scotia
- Acquired: 25 October 1813 by purchase after capture
- Renamed: 1813
- Fate: Captured and destroyed 14 February 1814

General characteristics
- Tons burthen: 211 (bm)
- Length: 83 ft (25.3 m) (overall); 65 ft 2 in (19.9 m)
- Beam: 24 ft 8 in (7.5 m)
- Depth of hold: 10 ft 6 in (3.2 m)
- Sail plan: Schooner
- Crew: 57
- Armament: 14 guns

HMS Pictou was a 14-gun schooner that the Royal Navy captured in 1813. She served briefly on the Royal Navy's North American station, capturing one or two merchantmen before the American frigate USS Constitution captured her during the War of 1812.

== History ==
The origins of Pictou are obscure. Some references report that she was built as the American letter of marque Syron. However, the most comprehensive listing of American letters of marque has no vessel by that name. Also, the London Gazette has no mention of the capture of any vessel with that name. Other references suggest that Pictou was originally a privateer by the name of Bonne Foi. Again, there is no record in the London Gazette of a capture of a privateer with that name.

Admiralty records show that in October 1813 Admiral Sir John Warren, commander-in-chief of the Royal Navy's North American station, purchased Syron and renamed her Pictou. Lieutenant Edward Stephens commissioned her. However, apparently Pictou was already serving the Royal Navy, and may well have been captured in the Caribbean.

On 12 May 1813, Pictou and Canso arrived at Halifax with five vessels that they had convoyed from Bermuda.

One source states that on 19 September Pictou captured the brig Isabella, of 126 tons (bm), which was sailing to Boston with a cargo of silk, wine, oil, etc. Other records give the date as 19 August, and the captor as the schooner Picton, although the Royal Navy had no vessel by that name. (Note: The announcement in the London Gazette, gives Pictou's name as Picton. This was a common mistake but there is no ambiguity or confusion as the Royal Navy did not use the name Picton until the 20th century. The mistake may have originated in the town of Pictou being relatively unknown, whilst Thomas Picton was a noted British general then serving in the Peninsular campaign.) The records of the Halifax Vice Admiralty court gives the date of capture as 19 July, and reports that Isabella P. Slaygur, master, had been sailing from Algeciras to Boston carrying wine, silk, oil and cork. A third source has the capture date as 22 July. A fourth account has Pictou bringing Isabella into Halifax on 23 July, and otherwise is consistent with the third account.

Pictou recaptured the sloop Ringdove, which the American privateer Polly, of Salem had captured. Polly had also captured a schooner carrying a cargo of stone, but the schooner too had been recaptured. Ringdove had been traveling from Halifax to Newfoundland when Polly had captured her.

== Loss ==
The USS Constitution captured Pictou on 14 February 1814, windward of Barbados.Pictou was escorting the armed merchant Lovely Ann from Bermuda to Surinam. In the morning Constitution, under the command of Captain Charles Stewart, stopped Pictou with a shot through her sails and captured her. A few hours before, Constitution had already captured Lovely Ann and had taken her as a prize. Captain Stewart decided to keep the merchant vessel but commanded that Pictou be destroyed. Pictou was one of five British warships that Constitution captured or destroyed during the war.

It is possible that Constitution did not destroy Pictou. The Vice admiralty court in Halifax, Nova Scotia recorded the capture of the vessel Three Friends, which it described as "alias his Majesty's sloop Pictou, captured July 30, 1814."
