= Preston (1809 ship) =

History

United Kingdom
- Name: Preston
- Builder: Denmark-Norway
- Acquired: 1809 by purchase of a prize
- Fate: Foundered October 1812

General characteristics
- Tons burthen: 161, or 162 (bm)
- Sail plan: Snow
- Complement: 13
- Armament: 6 × 6-pounder guns + 4 × 12-pounder carronades
- Notes: Built of fir and oak

Preston was a Dano-Norwegian vessel that the British captured c.1809. As a British merchantman she initially traded with the Iberian peninsula. An American vessel captured and released her in 1812 and she foundered later that year.

Preston first entered Lloyd's Register (LR) in 1809 with Simpson, master, Ditchburn, owner, and trade London–Gibraltar.

Year	Master	Owner	Trade	Source & notes
1811	Simpson; Ditchburn	Ditchburn	London–Gibraltar	LR; thorough repair 1806
1812	Ditchburn	Ditchburn	London–Corunna	Register of Shipping; small repairs 1811

Preston, Ditchburn, master, was sailing from Newfoundland to Trinidad in 1812 when she encountered the American letter of marque Lottery at 29°N 43°W. Lottery took sails, cables, and other stores. Lottery then released Preston, which arrived at Trinidad on 15 September. When Preston arrived at Trinidad, Ditchburn reported that the Americans had behaved more like pirates than privateersmen, looting private property and cabin stores.

In October Preston foundered while on her way from Trinidad to London. The Register of Shipping for 1813 carried the annotation "Lost" by her name.
