= HMS Dominica (1810) =

French schooner

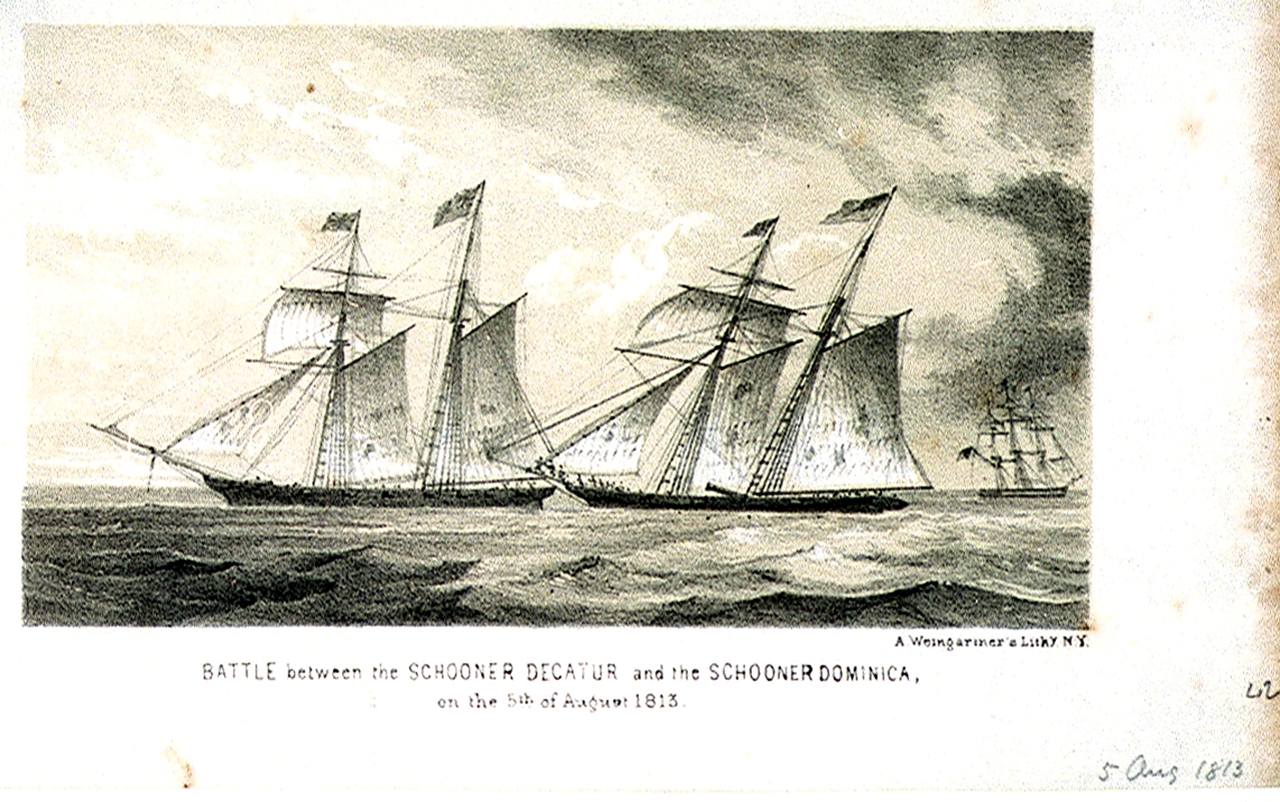
- Decatur captures Dominica

History

France
- Name: Duc de Wagram
- Namesake: Louis-Alexandre Berthier
- Launched: c.1805 (Chesapeake Bay)
- Notes: Privateer

United Kingdom
- Name: HMS Dominica
- Acquired: 1809 by capture; purchased and registered 1810
- Captured: 5 August 1813

France
- Name: Dominique
- Namesake: Dominica
- Acquired: August 1813 by capture
- Captured: May 1814
- Notes: Privateer

United Kingdom
- Name: HMS Dominica
- Acquired: 22 May 1814 (by capture)
- Fate: Wrecked 15 August 1815

General characteristics
- Type: schooner
- Tons burthen: 20325/95 (bm)
- Length: 89 ft 6 1/2 in (27.292 m) (overall); 71 ft 8 5/8 in (21.860 m) (keel)
- Beam: 23 ft 1 in (7.04 m)
- Depth of hold: 9 ft 3 3/4 in (2.838 m)
- Propulsion: Sails
- Sail plan: Schooner
- Complement: British service: 88 (including a sergeant, corporal and 13 Royal Marines); American letter of marque: 38
- Armament: French privateer: 14 guns; British service: 12 × 12-pounder carronades + 2 × 6-pounder bow chasers (Note: A letter from the District Court of South Carolina, the prize court, describes her armament as consisting of fourteen 12-pounder carronades, a 32-pounder carronade amidships, a brass 4-pounder gun, and a 32-pounder cannon. Another account keeps the two 6-pounder guns and twelve 12-pounder carronades, but concurs with respect to the 32-pounder and the 4-pounder.); American letter of marque: 4 × 6-pounder guns

HMS Dominica was the French letter of marque schooner Duc de Wagram, which the British captured in 1809 in the Leeward Islands and took into the Royal Navy in 1810. The American privateer Decatur captured her in 1813 in a notable single-ship action. However, Majestic recaptured her in 1814. She was wrecked in 1815

== Origins ==
Dominica was originally built in the Chesapeake area as a 14-gun, three-masted schooner in around 1805. (Note: Her plans have been reproduced in Cocker's Charleston Maritime Heritage (p. 163) and in Chapelle.) Then in 1809 she was armed at Guadeloupe as the letter of marque Duc de Wagram. The British captured her in 1809 and Admiral Lord Alexander Cochrane had her surveyed in Antigua. The results were so good that he purchased her for the Royal Navy.

== British Service ==
Between November 1810 and June 1811 Dominica underwent refitting at Deptford. In May 1811 Lieutenant Robert Hocking commissioned her for the Irish Sea and the Channel. Then on 23 November he sailed her to the West Indies.

In August 1812 Dominica captured three merchant vessels. The first was the Indiana (7 August), which was sailing to San Juan, Porto Rico, with a cargo of flour and lard. The second was the Endeavour (26 August), which was sailing to Norfolk, Virginia, with molasses and rum. The third was the Amphitrite (also 26 August), sailing to New London with rum, coffee, sugar, and the like.

On 11 November 1812, Hocking and Dominica captured the American privateer Providence, of Providence, Rhode Island, at 19 degrees latitude and 63 degrees 15 minutes longitude after an "anxious chase of ten hours". She had a crew of 60 men and was pierced for 12 guns but had thrown all but four overboard during the chase. She had been cruising for 30 days but had made no captures.

== Capture ==
Lieutenant George William Barrette took command later in 1812. On 5 August 1813 Dominica was escorting the packet ship Princess Charlotte when she encountered the American privateer Decatur under the command of Captain Dominique Diron.

Decatur was more lightly armed, though more heavily manned, and prevailed in the fight. The British lost 18 men killed, 42 wounded, and 70 captured, including the wounded, with Barrette being among the killed. (One of the wounded was an 11-year-old ship's boy, wounded in three places.) The Americans had five men killed and 15 wounded. The court martial on 3 January 1815 of the surviving officers and men of Dominica acquitted them for her loss.

The British agent at Charleston, South Carolina, wrote a letter suggesting that the cause of the loss was "to be attributed entirely to the Want of Knowledge of and Experience in the Management of a Schooner, on the part of Captain Barrette... and the Vessel herself being extremely difficult to Work." The same agent also reported that Decatur's crew was of French origin, "chiefly, if not all, Blacks, and Mulattoes" and that on boarding they had behaved with utmost cruelty, slaughtering the wounded on deck. A letter from the Judge of the District Court stated that the prisoners had been treated with the utmost humanity. The same letter described Dominica as little damaged by shot because she had been taken by boarding. Dominica was recommissioned in Charleston as the French letter of marque Dominique.

== Recapture ==
On 22 May 1814 Majestic recaptured Dominica. At the time of her recapture, Dominica was sailing under a letter of marque, had a crew of 36 men under the command of Beusen, master, and was armed with four 6-pounder guns. She was carrying a cargo of rice, tobacco, wine, and naval stores. The re-captured Dominica went into Halifax. Majestic shared the prize money for the capture with Doterel (or Dotterell) and Morgiana. (Note: A first-class share of one distribution of the prize money for the Dominica was worth £9 4s 0d; a sixth-class share, that of an ordinary seaman, was worth 1s 4d.)

== Fate ==
Lieutenant Robert Gibson recommissioned her on the Halifax station in October 1814. Lieutenant Richard Crawford replaced him in 1814. On 6 August 1815, she was moored in Murray's Anchorage alongside HMS Carron and HMS Regulus, and rode out a destructive gale that hit Bermuda. On 11 August 1815, she departed Bermuda, escorting a convoy to Barbados in the West Indies. On 15 August 1815, Dominica was wrecked on the reefs off Bermuda.
