= HMS Pomone (1805) =

Frigate of the Royal Navy

Coordinates: 50.6625°N 1.5902°W

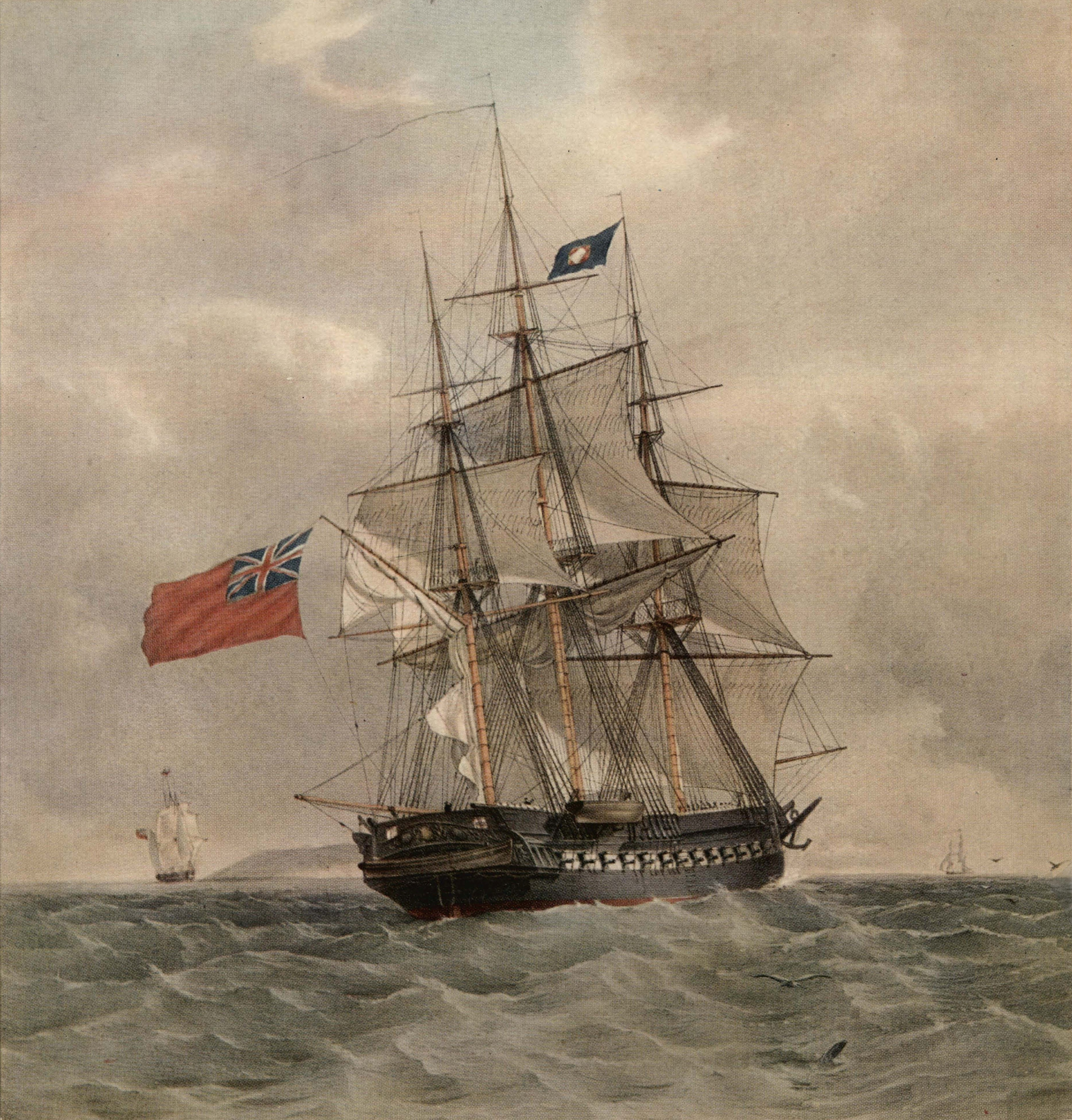
- HMS Pomone, from a colour lithograph by T. G. Dutton, after a painting by G.F. St.John

History

United Kingdom
- Name: Pomone
- Ordered: 25 November 1802
- Builder: Josiah and Thomas Brindley, Frindsbury
- Laid down: December 1803
- Launched: 17 January 1805
- Completed: 29 March 1805 at Chatham Dockyard
- Commissioned: February 1805
- Fate: Wrecked 14 October 1811

General characteristics
- Class & type: 38-gun Leda-class frigate
- Tons burthen: 1,076 tons (bm)
- Length: 150 ft 1 1/2 in (45.758 m) (gundeck); 125 ft 4 7/8 in (38.224 m) (keel)
- Beam: 39 ft 11 in (12.17 m)
- Depth of hold: 12 ft 9 in (3.89 m)
- Sail plan: Full-rigged ship
- Complement: 284, later 300, then 330
- Armament: Upper deck: 28 × 18-pounder guns; QD: 8 × 9-pounder guns + 14 × 32-pounder carronades; Fc: 2 × 9-pounder guns + 2 × 32-pounder carronades

HMS Pomone was a 38-gun Leda-class fifth rate of the Royal Navy launched in 1805. She saw action during the Napoleonic Wars, primarily in the Mediterranean while under the command of Captain Robert Barrie. She was wrecked off The Needles, part of the Isle of Wight, in 1811. The wreck is a Protected Wreck managed by Historic England.

== Service ==
Pomone was commissioned in February 1805 under Captain William Lobb for Channel Service. Under his command she took a smuggler and two privateers, of which only the first privateer is reported to have put up enough resistance to sustain casualties. On 6 May Pomone captured the smuggling vessel Fortune. On 5 November 1805, Pomone captured the Spanish privateer Golondrina, a lugger of four guns and with a crew of 29 men, on the coast of Spain. She had been out six weeks and had not made any captures. Before she surrendered she suffered two men wounded; Pomone had no casualties. Lobb set fire to Golondrina.

=== 1806 ===
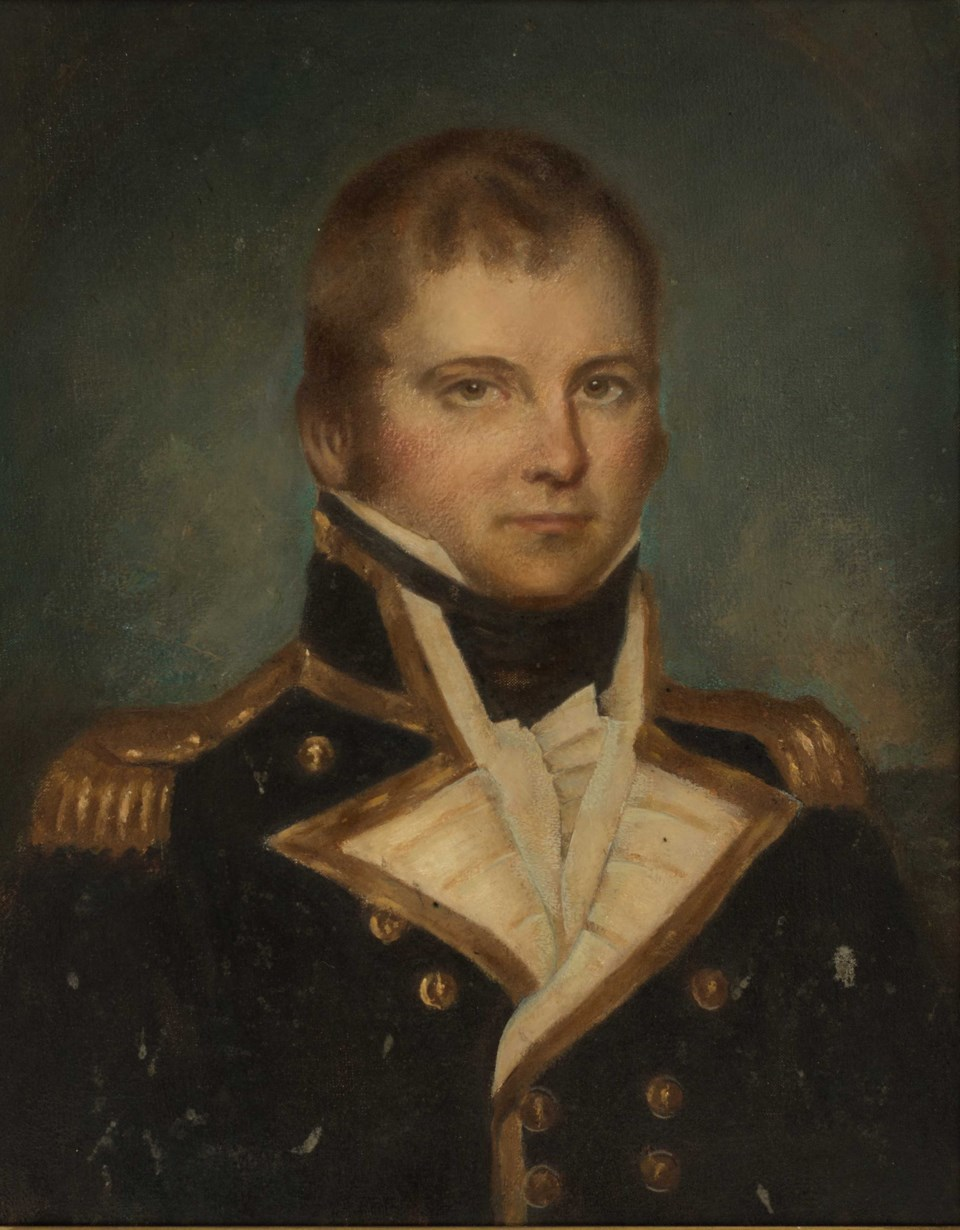
Robert Barrie, c.1825

Then in the new year, on 25 January 1806, Pomone's boats captured the Spanish privateer lugger Bengador, off Lisbon. She had one gun and a crew of 28 men. She was six weeks out of Bayonne and had taken one prize, Maid of the Mill, William Dearing (master), which had been on a voyage from Newfoundland to Lisbon. Pomone retook her prize, which Lobb sent on to Lisbon. He then destroyed the privateer. Avon shared in the recapture of Maid of the Mill. Captain Sir Robert Barrie took command in May 1806.

=== 1807 ===
In 1807, Pomone operated in the Channel. On 20 February 1807 Pomone was in company with HMS Penelope when she captured San Josef y Animas.

Between 21 April and 7 June, Pomone captured or destroyed 21 French vessels. In particular, on 7 May, boats from Pomone and Hazard cut out four luggers from the harbour of Oyle, Île de Ré. All were on their way from Bordeaux to Brest. Although enemy fire after the capture sank the lugger laden with canvas, the three laden with wine and brandy remained in British hands, at least until the British destroyed them. Barrie only recorded the name of one, Marie.

On 5 June, Pomone saw three armed brigs near the Île d'Yeu. The British squadron was too far away to notify, so Barrie decided to try to prevent them from reaching the Les Sables-d'Olonne. As Pomone approached the brigs she observed that they were escorting a convoy. Two brigs ran on shore and Pomone's boats succeeded in capturing another whose crew had abandoned her. Barrie then sent his boats to the harbour of St Giles where he had observed a number of vessels sitting becalmed.

In all, Pomone and her boats succeeded in cutting out 14 vessels from the harbour – seven brigs, five sloops, a dogger and a chasse-maree laden with wheat, flour and provisions. In addition to the two brigs that Pomone had driven ashore she also drove a schooner on shore. The convoy had sailed from Nantes, heading for Rochefort, but the prize crews took the vessels into Plymouth. The names of the prizes were later recorded as: Scevola, Jean St. Andre, Labourieux, Hazard, Marie, Jeune Amitie, Nymph, Bonne Aienture, Jean Margarette, Seconde, Marie Josephine, and Utile. Another of the vessels captured that day was Angelique. By agreement, Pomone shared the prize money for her with a number of British warships.

On 27 September 1807 Pomone was in company with Révolutionnaire when she captured the Danish ship Resolution.

=== 1808–1809 ===
On 27 March 1808 Pomone recaptured Susannah. Then on 27 July Barrie sailed Pomone for the Mediterranean.

Almost a year later, on the morning of 13 June 1809, off Cape Bon, she took the 3-gun Neapolitan privateer bombard Lucien Charles after a short chase. Lucien Charles was a new vessel of about 60 tons, was armed with one 12 and two 6-pounder guns, and carried a crew of 53 men. She was 10 days out of Naples, without having captured anything. However, Barrie thought it providential that he had intercepted her as two valuable Smyrna ships were in sight at the time. Barrie was also surprised to discover that she was under the command of Chevalier Charles Lucien Prevost de Boissi, Adjutant-General de France, and Officer de la Légion d'honneur. He therefore had his men search the privateer thoroughly but they found no documents that might explain the anomaly.

Then on 21 October, Pomone and Alceste were watching Toulon and spotted the French fleet putting to sea. Barrie immediately sailed to Cape St. Sebastian on the Catalan coast to notify Admiral Lord Collingwood in Ville de Paris that three French ships-of-the-line, two frigates and two smaller ships had separated from a convoy of about 20 sail. On 23 October, Barrie, and Captain Charles Bullen in Volontaire were able to signal the French squadron's position. That afternoon Pomone was able to burn two brigs, two bombards and a ketch belonging to the convoy before losing the enemy in the darkness. Rear Admiral George Martin, with eight vessels, chased the French squadron under Rear Admiral Francois Andre Baudin with the result that two French ships of the line, Lion and Robuste grounded near Frontignan, where their crews burnt them.

=== 1810 ===
On 10 March 1810, Seahorse, while in company with Pomone and Cephalus, captured Bella Nina. Then on 3 April Pomone captured Carducci. The next day Seahorse captured Buona Sorte. Cephalus and Volage were in company, and Pomone shared with Seahorse by agreement.

Between these two captures, on the last day of March, Pomone captured the French privateer Fortunee, which carried 10 guns and 53 men. On 11 May, Pomone captured the French xebec privateer Jupiter. She was armed with eight guns and carried a crew of 68 men.

=== 1811 ===
On 18 January 1811, Pomone captured the French privateer brig Dubourdieu, out of Toulon with a crew of 93 men and an armament with fourteen 12-pounder guns.

At daybreak on 13 March, Pomone was about 7 leagues (34 km) west of the Maddalena Archipelago between Corsica and Sardinia, when she sighted a brig to the east. Barrie gave chase but the winds were weak and by the following morning saw that during the night the enemy vessel had pulled much farther away. He continued the chase until about midday when the vessel entered a small cove on the north side of Montecristo, which is about 30 miles (48 km) south of Elba. When Pomone finally approached at about 4 o'clock, the brig's crew set her on fire; she blew up about an hour later. She turned out to have been the French man-of war Etourdie, under the command of Monfieur de Champagne. Etourdie had been launched at La Ciotat about three years earlier and carried sixteen carronades and two long guns forward. Barrie conjectured that she had sailed from Toulon, bound for Tunis or Corfu.

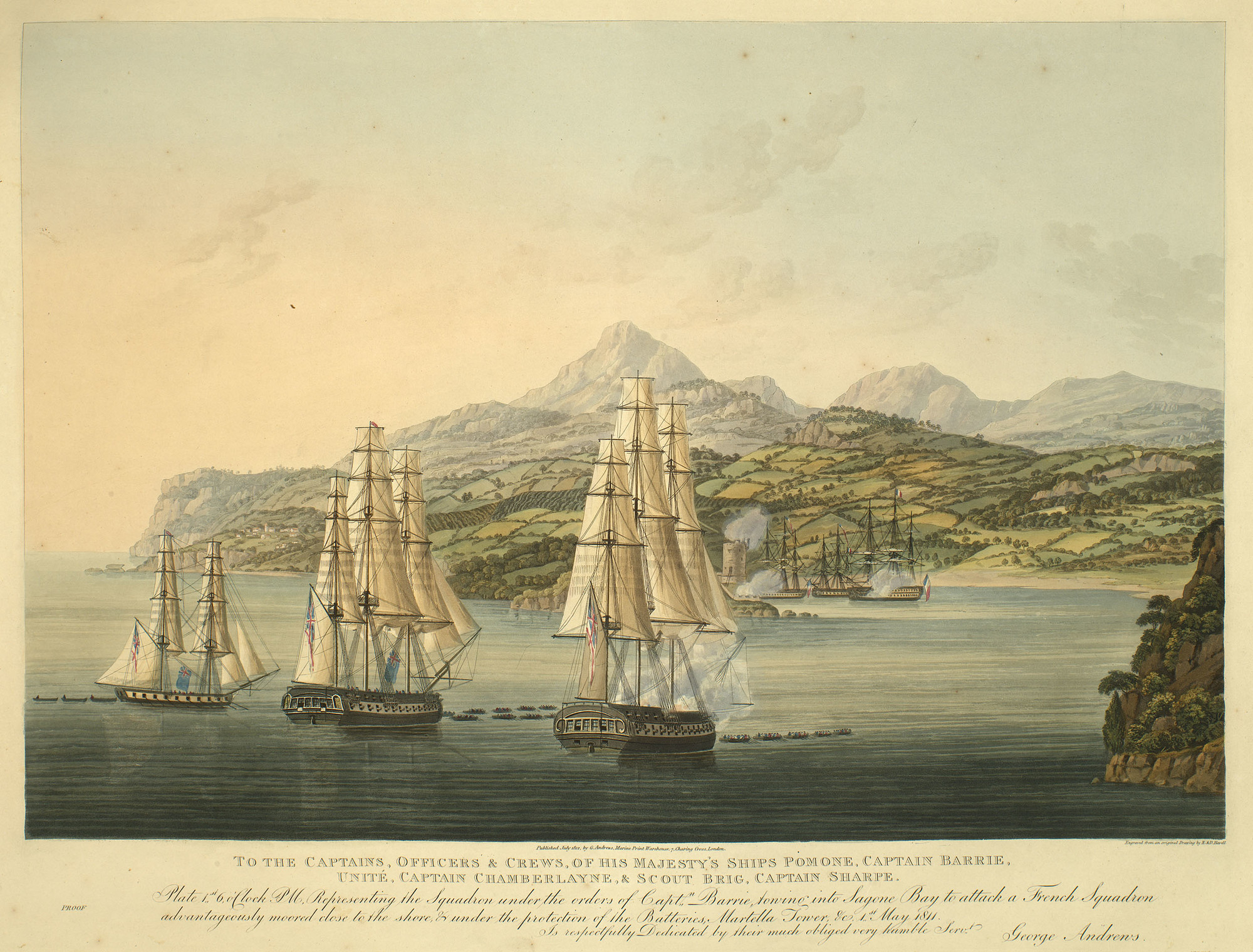
Pomone along with Unite and Scout prepare for the attack in Sagone Bay, 1811

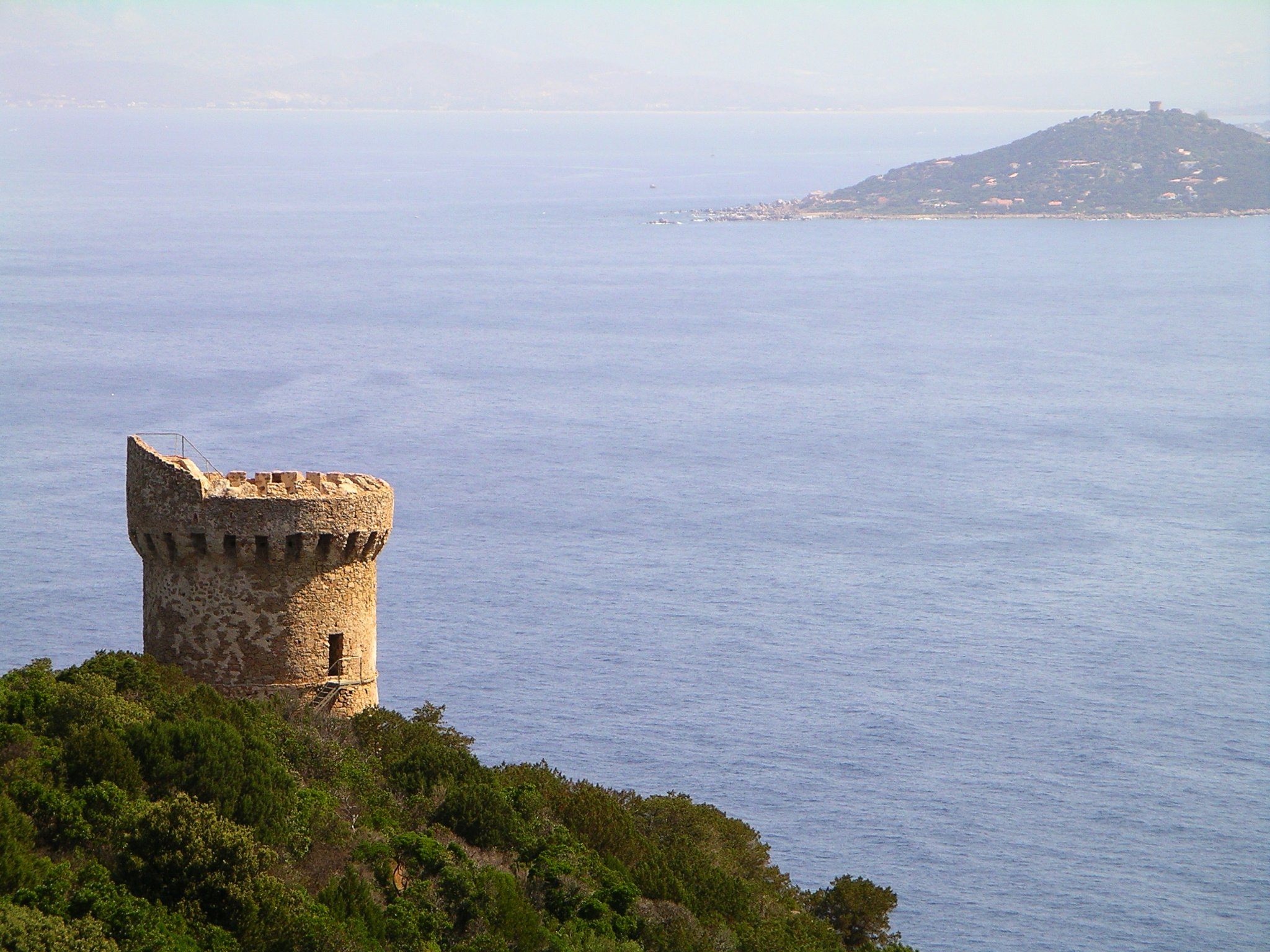
A Genoese tower in Corsica

On 30 April, Pomone reached the Bay of Sagone in Corsica, in company with the 40-gun frigate Unite, Captain Chamberlayne. The next morning the 18-gun Cruizer-class brig-sloop Scout, joined them. There were three vessels in the bay: the 26-gun Giraffe of about 1,100 tons, the 24-gun Nourrice of about 900 tons, and an armed merchant vessel of about 500 tons. A battery of four guns and a mortar covered the vessels, there were regular troops with field pieces on site, and what Barrie described as a Martello tower above the battery had a cannon too. Barrie would later discover from a prisoner that Nourrice had a crew of 160 men and Giraffe a crew of 140 men.

There being no wind, the three British captains had their boats tow their ships into range of the French vessels. After an hour and a half of bombardment by the British ships, the guns on shore were silent and all three French vessels were on fire. The British withdrew to avoid being damaged when the two French warships blew up.

The French vessels had been laden with timber and their destruction retarded ship building in Toulon until the next year. Also, the fires resulted in the destruction of the Genoese coastal tower (perhaps the Torra di Sagone), and the battery's ammunition store. Pomone lost two men killed and 19 wounded; Unite and Scout had six wounded between them.

While still in the Mediterranean, Pomone captured a vessel carrying Lucien Bonaparte, his family, retainers and plunder. Barrie took the party, some forty persons in all, to Malta, arriving on 23 August 1810. Barrie held that Bonaparte's ill-gotten gains were private property and relinquished all claims.

== Loss ==
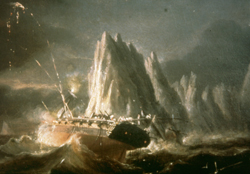
Pomone wrecking, from the Hampshire and Wight Trust for Maritime Archaeology

Returning from the Mediterranean with Sir Harford Jones, the British Ambassador to Persia, on board, as well as some Arab stallions that the Shah of Persia had sent as a present to King George III, Pomone struck on The Needles at seven o'clock on Monday, 14 October 1811. However, the master mistook the light at The Needles for the light at Hurst Castle. When the light was seen, Barrie feared that Pomone was too far south. He went forward but by the time land was spotted it was too late; someone shouted out a warning but the helmsman could not get turn her in time.

Pomone struck a sunken rock about two cables' length to the southwest of Needles point. Pomone traversed the rock but she had lost her rudder and was holed in several places, leading her to immediately fill with water. Full of water and having lost her rudder, Pomone was sluggish. As a result, the waves then forced her onto Needle Point. The crew cut away her masts but could not get her off.

There was no wind, and as a result, boats from the guardship Tisiphone and pilot boats from Yarmouth were able to get alongside in an hour and take off the crew. The gunbrig Escort took Sir Hartford to Portsmouth. Over the next three days Pomone's cannon, masts, cargo and valuables were all salvaged, with the Shah's horses being manhandled out through the gun ports. She had 55,000 dollars on board, which were saved except for 4,000 dollars that some of the crew stole. A marine stove in spirit casks and drank himself senseless; he was sentenced to 50 lashes but later pardoned on the basis of his prior good record.

A court martial on 25 October absolved Barrie and his officers of blame. However the board severely reprimanded the master for failing to take accurate bearings of Hurst Castle and for having not paid sufficient attention to Barrie's warnings about the lighthouse. In response to the wrecking the Admiralty ordered that its ships should not attempt the Needle Passage at night. Barrie was appointed to the 74-gun third rate, Dragon.

== Wreck site ==
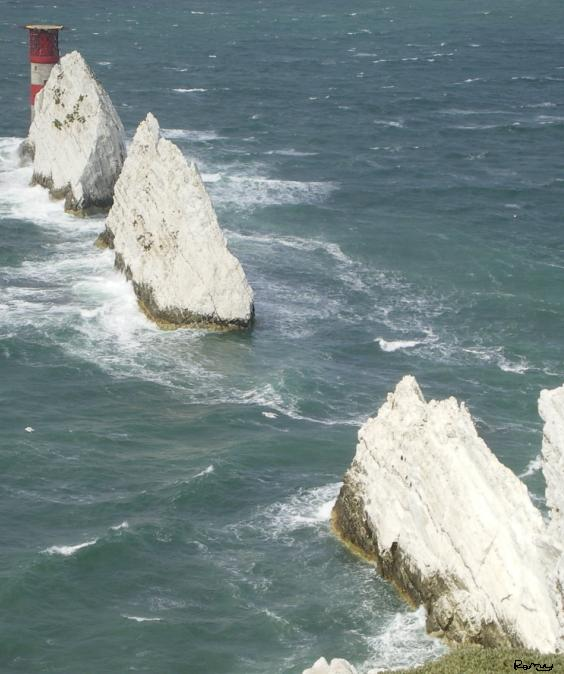
The Needles from the cliffs inshore at The Needles Batteries

The shipwreck site identified at The Needles contains the remains of two wrecks, thought to be HMS Assurance and the stern part of Pomone. The wreck site was designated under the Protection of Wrecks Act on 4 April 1974. The majority of finds recovered from this double wreck site are thought to be from Pomone.

It is possible that another wreck site identified in Alum Bay could be the bow end of Pomone.

The wreck site was identified by an Isle of Wight resident, Derek Williams, who became the first licensee.

The Hampshire and Wight Trust for Maritime Archaeology operates the Underwater Archaeology Centre, which is housed in five former casemates of Fort Victoria (Isle of Wight). The museum houses several exhibitions, including one about the wreck of Pomone.
