= Torra di Sagone =

Ruined Genoese tower in Vico, Corsica

Tower of Sagone
- Torra di Sagone (Corsican)
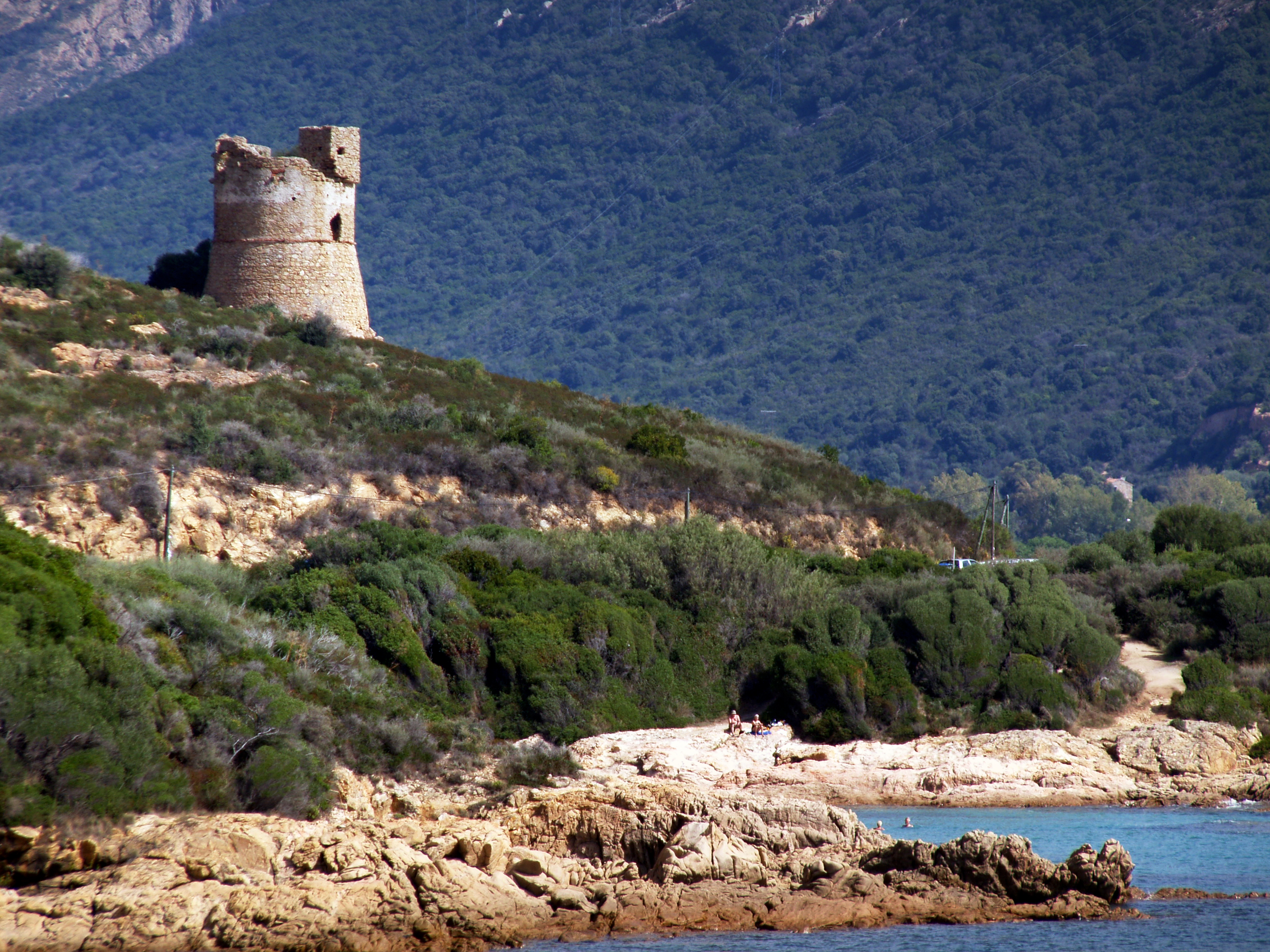

- Location within Corsica
- 42°06′38″N 8°41′12″E

History
- Built: 1581

Monument historique
- Designated: 19 April 1974
- Reference no.: PA00099123

The Tower of Sagone (Corsican: Torra di Sagone) is a ruined Genoese tower located in the commune of Vico (Corse-du-Sud) on the west coast of the Corsica. The tower sits on the west side of the Anse de Sagone.

The tower was built in 1581 and replaced an earlier tower. It was one of a series of coastal defences constructed by the Republic of Genoa between 1530 and 1620 to stem the attacks by Barbary pirates. The tower is privately owned and in 1974 was listed as one of the official historical monuments of France.

== Gallery ==
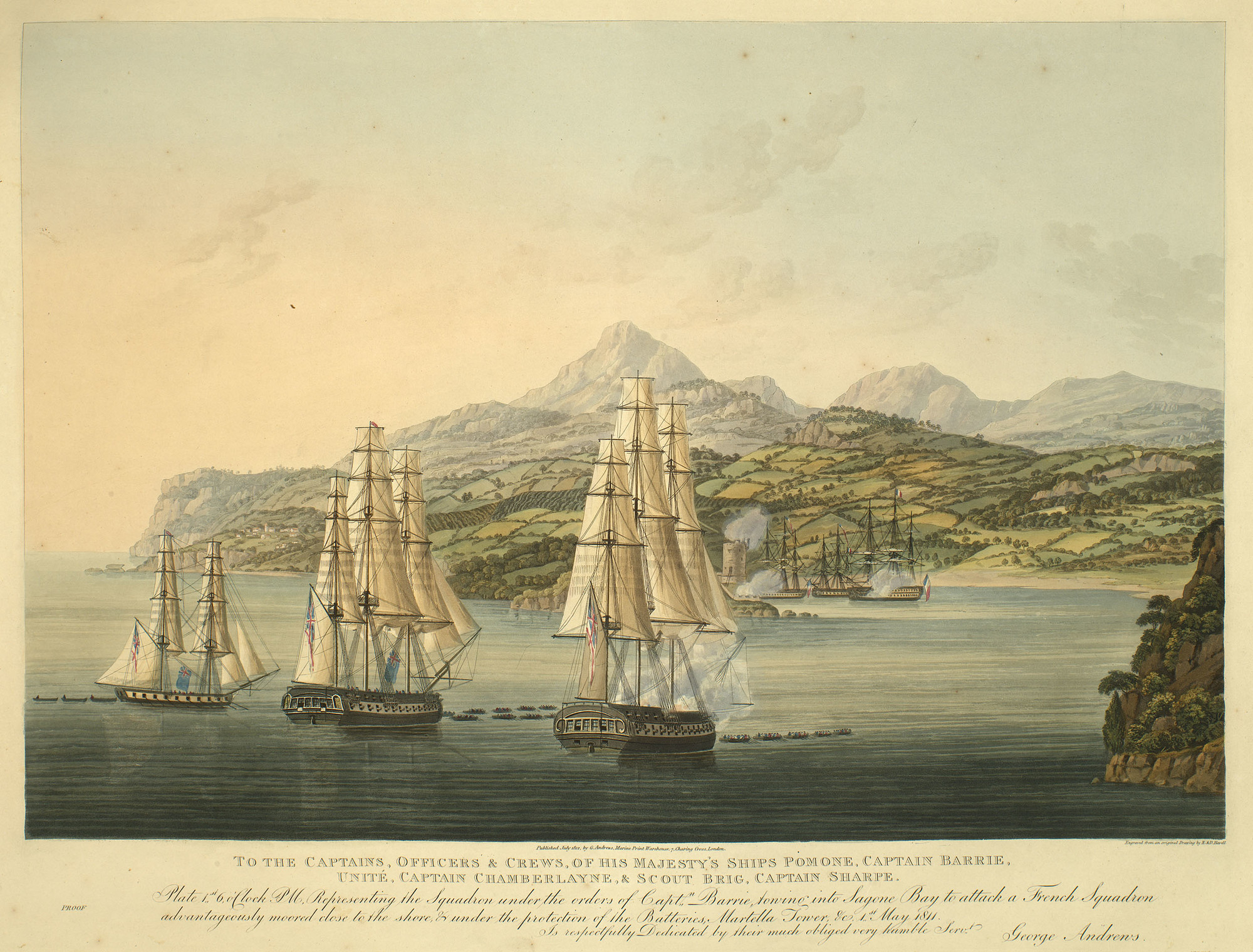
The Royal Navy prepare to attack French ships in Sagone Bay, 1 May 1811

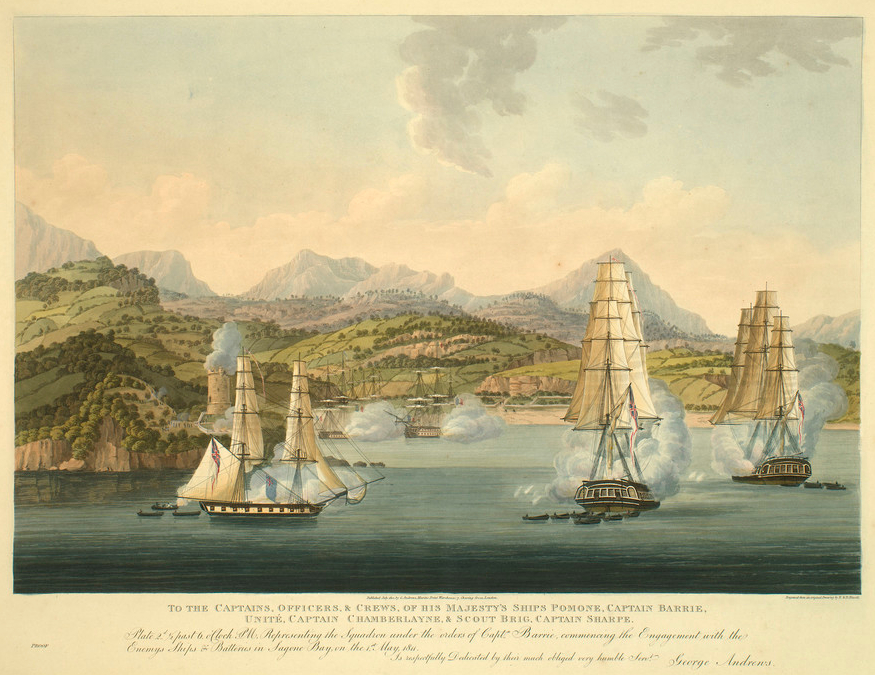
HMS Scout, HMS Pomone, and HMS Unite make their attack

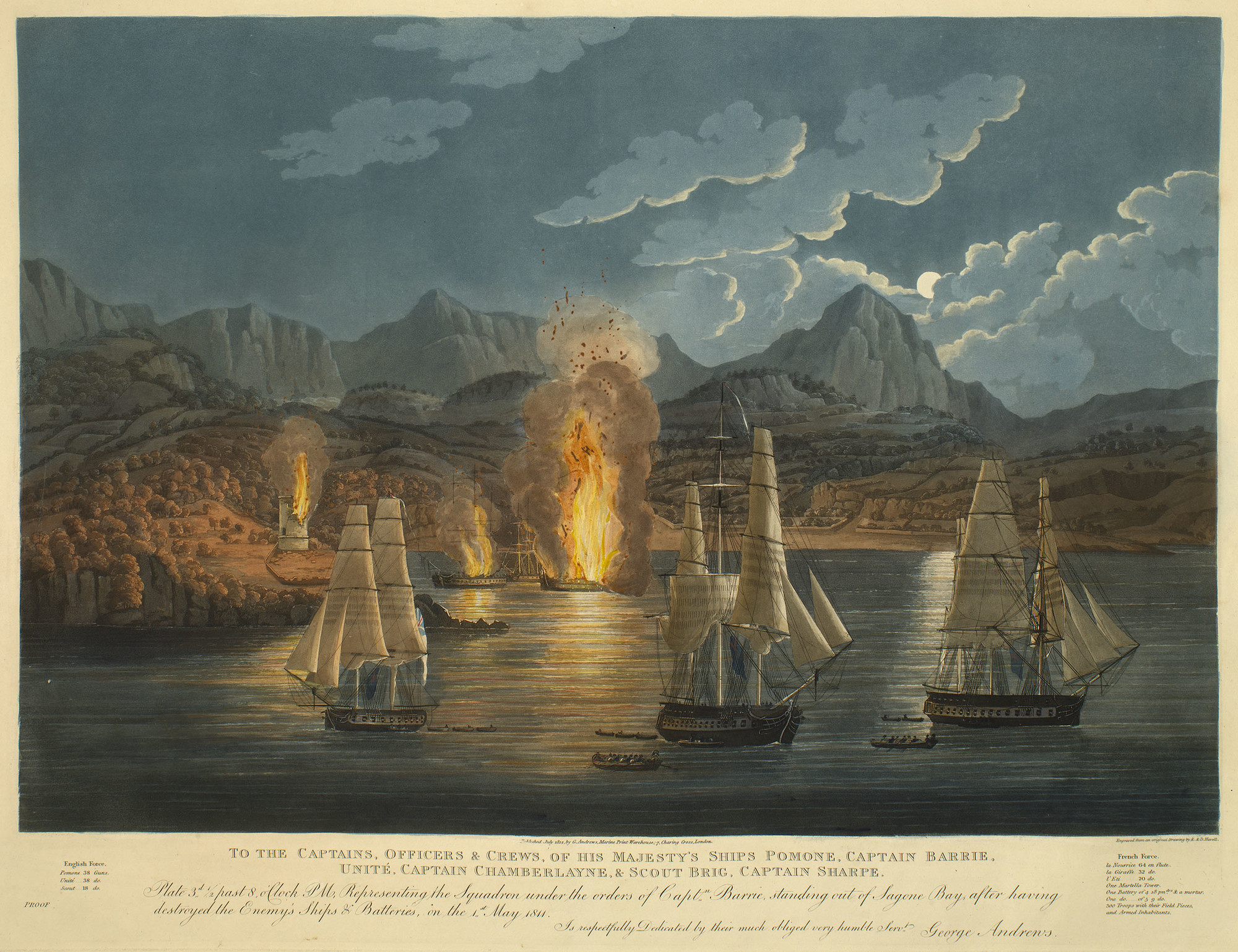
The French ships and the tower on fire

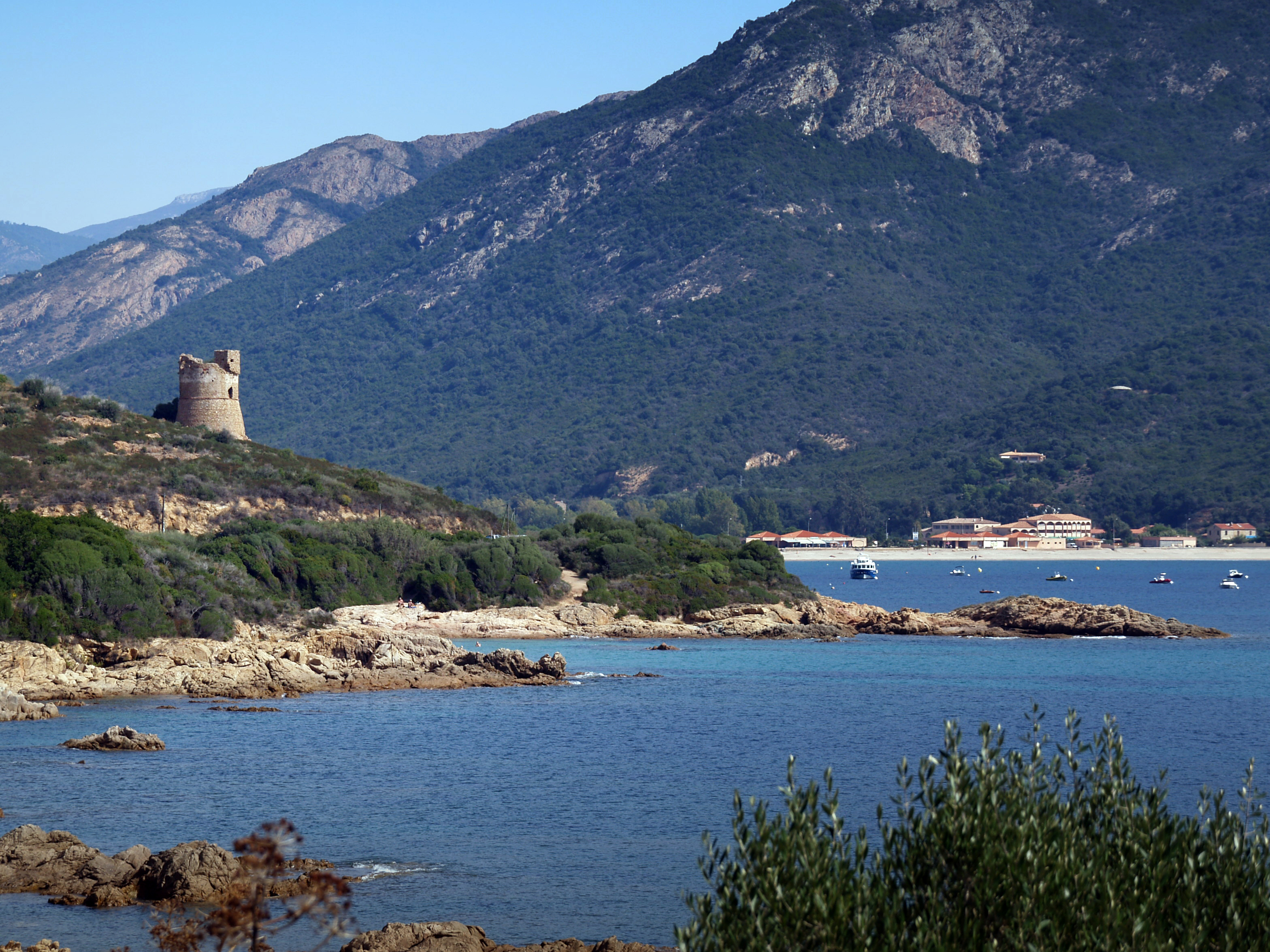
The scene in 2006

== See also ==
- List of Genoese towers in Corsica
