= Countess of Harcourt (1811 ship) =

History

United Kingdom
- Name: Countess of Harcourt
- Owner: George Frederick Young
- Builder: Chiene, Prince of Wales's Island
- Launched: 9 January 1811 (Note: Phipps reports 1812 as the launch year, but that is incorrect as she was already in service by then.)
- Captured: June 1814

United States
- Name: Sabine
- Acquired: Purchased October 1814
- Captured: 15 January 1815

United Kingdom
- Name: Countess of Harcourt
- Acquired: By capture 15 January 1815
- Fate: Wrecked in December 1830

General characteristics
- Tons burthen: 491, or 501, or 502, and later 517, or 51774/94 (bm)
- Length: 112 ft 6 in (34.3 m)
- Beam: 32 ft 10 in (10.0 m)
- Propulsion: Sail
- Complement: 90 (1814)
- Armament: 2 × 4-pounder guns + 6 × 12-pounder carronades

Countess of Harcourt was a two-decker, teak merchant ship launched at Prince of Wales's Island in 1811, and sold in Great Britain in 1814. An American privateer captured her in 1814, but the British recaptured her in 1815. Later, she made five trips transporting convicts to Australia. Between the third and fourth of these, she undertook a voyage to China and Nova Scotia while under charter to the British East India Company (EIC). She was wrecked in late 1830.

== Origins ==
Countess of Harcourt was built in 1811 at Prince of Wales's Island, one of only three major vessels built there between 1810 and 1814. She participated as one of the transports in the British reduction of Java, under the auspices of Lord Minto. She was in the second division, which left Malacca on 7 June 1811.

Afterwards, she traded around India briefly. On 7 May 1813 she sailed from Isle de France (Mauritius) to Madras, where she arrived on 4 June. On that voyage she carried the American Baptist missionaries Adoniram Judson and his wife, who were endeavouring to reach Penang, but ended up in Burma instead.

Countess of Harcourt then sailed to England where she was sold. This was apparently a way for the EIC to remit money back to England. She was admitted to the registry in Great Britain on 23 April 1814.

== Capture and recapture ==
The Register of Shipping for 1814 shows Countess of Harcourt with F. Metcalf, master, Dixon & Co., owner, and trade Portsmouth—India.

The American privateer Sabine, of Baltimore, captured Countess of Harcourt, Davis, master, in June 1814 in the Channel while she was on her way to Isle of France (Mauritius) from London. (Note: Sabine's master was Jonathon Rowland. She was armed with ten guns, and had a crew of 100 men.) Countess of Harcourt was carrying dry goods, brandy, rum, gin, etc., when she separated from the fleet in a gale. Sabine sent her into St. Marys, Georgia.

At St Marys, Countess of Harcourt was tried at the Court of Admiralty and found a lawful prize. She was offered at auction and on 5 August the Baltimore merchants Diego Williams, Juan Gooding, and Juan Donnell purchased her, named her Sabine, and appointed John Brown as her master. He then moved her into Spanish waters, i.e., up a creek connected with the Spanish river that fed into St. Marys River. Brown's intent was to place Sabine in neutral waters to keep her safe from seizure by the British. The river was then part of the international border between the United States and Spanish Florida; it now forms part of the boundary between Georgia and Florida.

The Battle of Fort Peter took place in January 1815 on the Georgia side of the St. Marys River. After capturing the fort and St. Marys, British forces went up the river. In all, they captured two American gunboats and 12 merchantmen, including Countess of Harcourt.

The British also captured a quantity of cotton and tobacco which they loaded onto Countess of Harcourt with the aim of sending her to Bermuda. In crossing the bar she had knocked off her rudder and broken all the pintles. A makeshift rudder was fashioned from one belonging to the wreck of a 400-ton vessel.

Commander James Scott volunteered to take Countess of Harcourt to Bermuda. He had a crew of 20 men, some wounded men, and 120 runaway slaves. HMS Doterel provided an escort. The two vessels were about 100 miles from Bermuda when a gale developed. The next day Scott found it necessary to abandon Countess of Harcourt and transfer everybody on board her to Doterel, leaving her drifting, but afloat. Eventually the news got to London where Lloyd's List reported that towards the end of February 1815 she lost her rudder and sails and her crew abandoned her.

In the night Doterel missed Bermuda. However, the next day they encountered HMS Jaseur, which pointed them in the correct direction and Doterel reached Bermuda the day after that. Scott tried to get a naval vessel to go out and retrieve Countess of Harcourt, but none was available. Some did send out boats, as did some private individuals. Thinking that she might drift towards Bermuda, Scott advised the signal post to keep an eye out for her and to let him know if they spotted her. Next morning a man from the signal post notified him that they had sighted a vessel answering the description of Countess of Harcourt.

A race to retrieve her developed between Scott in the schooner-tender Anna Marie, which he had commandeered, and the brig-sloop HMS Harlequin. If Scott arrived first, Countess of Harcourt would be salvage; if Harlequin arrived first she would be a prize. Scott had no claim either way as his status was that of volunteer. In the end, Scott arrived on Countess of Harcourt moments before a boat with a boarding party from Harlequin arrived. Scott was in possession and signed a letter to Harlequin's captain acknowledging the salvage rights. Countess of Harcourt arrived at Bermuda around 8 March.

Captain John Brown protested the recapture of Sabine/Countess of Harcourt, arguing that the British seizure had been in violation of Spain's neutrality. He was apparently unsuccessful as prize money for Countess of Harcourt, the bark Maria Theresa, goods from the ship Carl Gustaff, and the schooner Cooler, was paid in April 1824. (Note: A first-class share of the prize money was worth £17 2s 0½d; a sixth-class share was worth 3s 6¼d.)

== Voyages ==
Countess of Harcourt's first voyage transporting convicts took place in 1821. Under the command of George Bunn, with surgeon Morgan Price, she sailed from Portsmouth on 19 April and arrived at Hobart Town on 27 July 1821. Contrary winds prevented her entering the Derwent two days earlier. As it was, the journey took only 99 days, which remained a record until 1837. She carried 172 male convicts, none of whom died during the voyage. Countess of Harcourt was at Batavia around 24 October 1821, from where she returned to England.

On her second voyage transporting convicts, Captain Bunn and surgeon Robert Armstrong left Cork on 3 September 1822 and arrived at Port Jackson on 22 December. Countess of Harcourt carried 172 convicts, one of whom died on the voyage. One officer and 30 other ranks from the 3rd Regiment of Foot provided the guards.

Countess of Harcourt returned to London via Batavia. After she arrived in The Downs, the captain went to London, where the owners directed her to Rotterdam. Three seaman refused to work on the voyage to Rotterdam, but claimed their wages for that part of the voyage. The result was a case in the High Court of Admiralty, which ruled that the inclusion of the words "and elsewhere" after the words "London, Van Dieman's Land via Cork" did not entitle the owners to extend the voyage once she had returned to London. The Court found in favour of the mariners and the owners were ordered to pay costs and wages.

On her third voyage transporting convicts, she was under the command of George Bunn, with surgeon J. Dickson. She sailed from The Downs on 23 March 1824, and arrived at Port Jackson on 12 July. She carried 174 or so male convicts; one convict died during the voyage One officer and 36 other ranks from the 40th Regiment of Foot provided the guards.

Countess of Harcourt left Port Jackson on 24 August with supplies and in company with HMS Tamar and HMS Lady Nelson. The 3rd Regiment of Foot provided a detachment of soldiers. The three ships were sailing to Port Essington to form a new settlement there. Port Essington proved unsatisfactory, and the expedition established a settlement at Fort Dundas. On 13 November 1824 Countess of Harcourt and Tamar departed. Countess of Harcourt sailed first to Isle de France (Mauritius), and from there to Britain.

For her next voyage, Countess of Harcourt was under charter to the EIC; her managing owner was George Frederick Young. Under the command of Captain Thomas Delafone (or Delaphon, or Delaphous), she left The Downs on 25 June 1825, bound for China and Nova Scotia. She reached Whampoa anchorage on 6 December. She crossed the Second Bar on 24 January 1826, and reached St Helena on 19 April. By 29 May she was at Halifax, Nova Scotia. She returned to her mooring in Britain on 13 August.

The fourth voyage transporting convicts took place under the command of William Harrison, with surgeon Michael Goodsir. She sailed from Dublin, Ireland, on 14 February 1827 and arrived at Port Jackson on 28 June. She carried 194 male convicts, two of whom died during the voyage.

In 1827 Countess of Harcourt was sold to Kains & Co., London. She was advertised as leaving Sydney in August, bound for Île de France.

On her fifth voyage transporting convicts, Countess of Harcourt was under the command of William Harrison, with surgeon John Drummond. She sailed from London on 3 May 1828, and arrived at Port Jackson on 8 September 1828. She carried 184 male convicts, none of whom died during the voyage.

== Lloyd's Register ==
Lloyd's Register listed Countess of Harcourt from 1818 to 1831. One concern with Lloyd's Register information is that a lack of change may either mean that nothing has changed from the previous year, or that the owner did not provide updated information.

Lloyd's Register	Master	Tons	Owner	Trade
1818	Davis	491	Fisher & Co.	London-India
1819	Davis	491	Fisher & Co.	London-India
1820	Davis	491	Fisher & Co.	London-India
1821	Davis	491	Fisher & Co. G. Young	London-India
1822	G. Bunn	491	G. F. Young	London-India
1823	G. Bunn	491	G.F. Young	London - NSW
1824	G. Bunn	491	G.F. Young	London - NSW
1825	G. Bunn	491	G.F. Young	London
1826	Delafons	491	Young & Co.	London-China
1827	Harrison	491	Kains & Co.	Liverpool-NSW
1828	Harrison	491	Kains & Co.	Liverpool-NSW
1829	Harrison	491	Kains & Co.	London-NSW
1830	W. Smith	517	Kains & Co.	London transport
1831	A. Molison	517	Somes & Co.	Cork

== Fate ==
Countess of Harcourt was wrecked on the coast of Corfu in December 1830. A more precise account has her wrecking on 18 December 1830 on the island of Corrente, Cape Passaro, a point on the southwest corner of Sicily (possibly near 36.6869°N 15.1483°E), as she was transporting troops from Corfu to Malta.
