= HMS Canso (1813) =

History

United States
- Name: Lottery
- Builder: Talbot Co., Maryland
- Launched: 1811
- Home port: Baltimore
- Captured: 8 February 1813

United Kingdom
- Name: HMS Canso
- Namesake: Canso, Nova Scotia
- Acquired: 8 February 1813, by capture
- Fate: Sold 1816

General characteristics
- Type: Schooner
- Tons burthen: 206 (American), or 225 (bm)
- Length: 93 ft 0 in (28.3 m) (overall); 75 ft 9 in (23.1 m) (keel)
- Beam: 23 ft 8 in (7.2 m)
- Depth of hold: 10 ft 2 in (3.1 m)
- Armament: 16 guns

HMS Canso was the American letter of marque schooner Lottery, launched in 1811, that a British squadron captured in 1813. The Royal Navy took Lottery into service as HMS Canso and she served during the War of 1812 and briefly thereafter. The navy sold her in 1816.

== Career and capture ==
Lottery was copper-bottomed and fastened. She was pierced for 16 cannons, though she was armed with only six 12-pounder carronades at the time of her capture.

She sailed under a letter of marque dated 24 July 1812, was armed with six 9-pounder carronades, and had a crew of 30 men under the command of her captain John Southcomb. On her way to Pernambuco she captured one prize, the brig Preston, which however contained so little of value that Southcomb gave her up after having plundered her of sails, cables, and stores. Preston, of 10 guns and 13 men, was under the command of Captain Ditchburn. Preston had been on her way to Trinidad when Lottery captured her.

Lottery reached Pernambuco on 7 October. On her way back to Baltimore, Lottery captured the schooner Dolphin, under the command of Samuel Green, which had been sailing from New Brunswick to Jamaica. Lottery also released Dolphin.

On his return, Southcomb remained in Baltimore until 6 February. He exchanged Lottery's armament for six 12-pounder carronades, and assembled a crew of 28 men.

On 8 February 1813, nine boats and 200 men of a British naval squadron comprising Belvidera, Statira, Maidstone, and Junon captured Lottery in Lynnhaven Bay on the Chesapeake. Her crew put up a strong defense with the result that the British cutting out party suffered six men wounded, half severely or dangerously, one of whom died later; the Americans suffered 19 men wounded, including Southcomb, before they struck. Southcomb died of his wounds and his body was taken ashore. Lottery had been carrying a cargo of coffee, sugar and lumber from Baltimore to Bordeaux. The British had earlier captured the schooner Rebecca, and they sent her into Norfolk as a cartel with the American wounded.

== British service ==
A week after her capture, Lottery convoyed several prizes to Bermuda. There the Royal Navy took her into service as HMS Canso under the command of Lieutenant Wentworth P. Croke, who assumed command on 28 February. (He would remain her commander until she was sold. On 12 May Canso and Pictou arrived in Halifax, Nova Scotia with the mail from Bermuda and five vessels that they were convoying.

On 11 September Canso captured the ship Massachusetts. Then on 13 November Canso was among several vessels that grounded in a hurricane at Halifax. Most, including Canso, suffered no material injury and were quickly got off.

On 11 May 1814, Canso recaptured the brig Traveller, of Leith. Traveller, Bishop, master, had been sailing from North Bergen to Gibraltar when the American privateer Surprise had captured her. On 30 May Traveller was off Portsmouth.

In the second half of the year Canso was part of a squadron that operated in the Chesapeake. There, between 17 and 19 July vessels of the squadron captured the schooners Buzi and Margaret, with cargoes of flour, tobacco, tar, and clothing. (Note: A first-class share of the prize money was worth £13 1s 9¼d; a sixth-class share, that of an ordinary seaman, was worth 2s 8d.) On 23 July they captured the schooner Unity, including 176 hogsheads of tobacco. (Note: A first-class share of the prize money was worth £19 2s 0d; a sixth-class share was worth 4s 6d.)

On 4 September the brig Charlotte arrived at Halifax. She had been sailing from Antigua to Greenock or Port Glasgow when on 31 August the US privateer Mammoth captured her. Canso recaptured Charlotte, but the US privateer Grand Turk recaptured her for the Americans. Then HMS Wasp re-captured Charlotte for the last time and sent her in to Halifax. (Note: Charlotte, of 16 tons, Ezekiel Allen, master, had a cargo of 42 puncheons, 116 tierces, and 27 barrels of sugar, 22 hogsheads and 17 puncheons of rum, 20 hogsheads and 33 tierces of coffee, and 20 puncheons of molasses.)

Between 29 November and 19 December 1814, captured the schooner Mary and the transports Lloyd and Abeona. (Note: A first-class share of the prize money was worth £26 15s 10½d; a sixth-class share was worth 6s 1½d.)

The squadron, under the command of Admiral George Cockburn, then sailed south to St. Marys, Georgia, where they attacked Fort Peter, a small fort protecting the town. Point Peter is located at the mouth of Point Peter Creek and the St. Marys River. (Note: The St. Mary's River forms the boundary between Georgia and Florida.) The battle of Fort Peter occurred in January 1815, after the signing of the Treaty of Ghent, which would end the War of 1812, but before the treaty's ratification. The attack on Fort Peter occurred at the same time as the siege of Fort St. Philip in Louisiana and was part of the British occupation of St. Marys and Cumberland Island.

At Fort Peter on 13 January the British captured two American gunboats and 12 merchantmen, including the East Indiaman Countess of Harcourt, which an American privateer had captured on her way from India to London. Prize money for the Countess of Harcourt, the bark Maria Theresa, goods from the ship Carl Gustaff, and the schooner Cooler, was paid in April 1824. (Note: A first-class share of the prize money was worth £17 2s 0½d; a sixth-class share was worth 3s 6¼d.)

On 31 January the squadron captured St. Simons, Georgia, and the schooner Reserve. (Note: A first-class share of the prize money was worth £1 12s 10¼d; a sixth-class share was worth 5d.) Off Amelia Island on 10 and 12 February the squadron captured the ships Maria Francisca and Governor Kindeland. (Note: A first-class share of the prize money was worth £15 12s 0½d; a sixth-class share was worth 3s 7d.) Lastly, two days later they captured the brig Fortuna, Jansen, master, also off Amelia Island. (Note: A first-class share of the prize money was worth £12 6s 9d; a sixth-class share was worth 2s 9d.)

Canso recaptured the British ship Hercules off Abacco on 9 March.

== Post-war and fate ==
In July 1815, Canso seized four vessels at Bermuda: the brig Roland (7 July), the schooner Farmer's Delight ( 17 July), and schooners Stralsund and Pheasant (27 July). Proceeds were received from the Custom House, suggesting that smuggling was involved. On 9 August 1815 she departed Bermuda and sailed for Halifax with despatches.

The "Principal Officers and Commissioners of His Majesty's Navy" offered Canso for sale on 18 April 1816 at Deptford. Canso sold on 30 May 1816.
