= Robert Barrie =

Royal Navy officer

Rear-Admiral Sir Robert Barrie KCB KCH
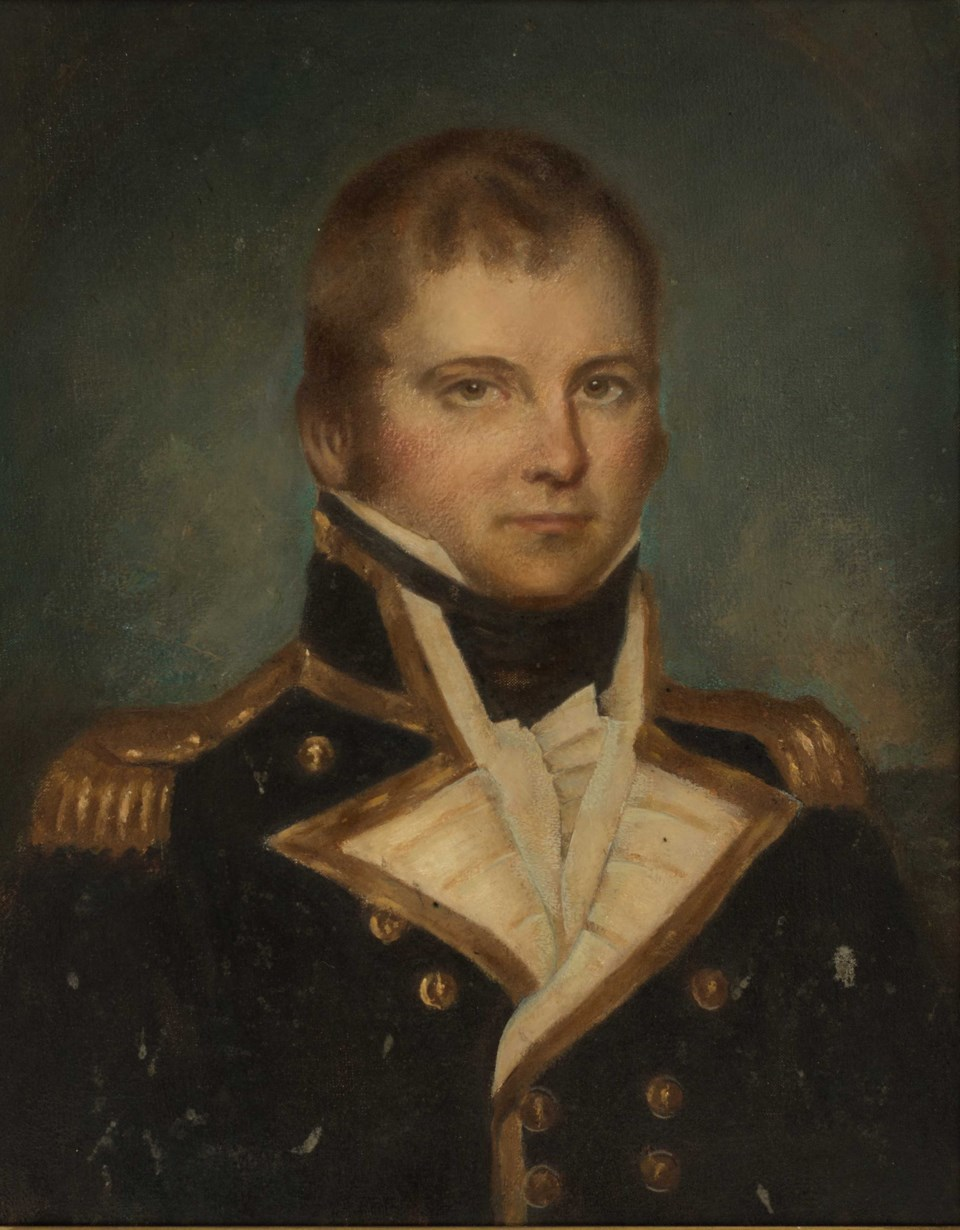
- Portrait of Barrie
- Born: 5 May 1774; St. Augustine, East Florida
- Died: 7 June 1841 (aged 67) Swarthdale, England
- Allegiance: Great Britain; United Kingdom
- Branch: Royal Navy
- Service years: 1788–1841
- Rank: Rear admiral
- Commands: HMS Calypso; HMS Dragon; HMS Brilliant; HMS Pomone; HMS Cockburn
- Conflicts: Napoleonic Wars; War of 1812
- Awards: Knight Commander of the Order of the Bath; Knight Commander of the Royal Guelphic Order
- Other work: Commissioner of the Kingston Royal Naval Dockyard

Rear-Admiral Sir Robert Barrie, KCB, KCH (5 May 1774 – 7 June 1841) was a Royal Navy officer who served in the Napoleonic Wars and the War of 1812. He was helped early in his naval career by the patronage of his uncle, Sir Alan Gardner, who arranged for him to take part in the Vancouver Expedition. When the Pacific Coast was explored, he had served as a midshipman with Captain Vancouver in 1791. He attained the rank of Rear-Admiral in the Royal Navy.

== Career ==
Barrie served in European waters from 1801 to 1811. He was mentioned in dispatches for his gallant conduct in a fight with a French squadron when, as First Lieutenant of Bourdelais, "though dangerously wounded, he had disdained to quit the deck". Barrie then commanded a number of ships during the French Revolutionary and Napoleonic Wars. In 1804 he had been promoted Captain commanded Brilliant at 24-guns and in 1806 he went to Pomone at 38-guns. On 5 June 1807, he attacked a convoy of seventeen ships, sank three men-of-war, and captured fourteen other warships and store ships. He captured a privateer commanded by De Boissi, the Adjutant-General of France. In 1809, he captured a French warship and five transports. In 1811 he captured a Corsican fort and three French men-of-war. In 1811, he captured several important French prisoners, including Napoleon's brother Lucien Bonaparte on a French ship. He was particularly active during the War of 1812, carrying out several successful attacks on American towns and shipping in the Penobscot River region, and helping to destroy the Chesapeake Bay Flotilla. From 1813 to 1815 he served in the Dragon in American waters, and here again he made many captures. In 1813 Barrie collected runaway slaves from the Maryland and Virginia shores. After a brief period spent living in France Barrie took up the post of Acting Commissioner of the Quebec Dockyard 1817–1818.

By 1819, he served as Commissioner of the dockyard at Kingston. He was active in a number of areas, building and expanding the dockyard and promoting important hydrographic surveys and the construction of canals. Between 1819 and 1820 Captain Barrie, as Flag Officer of the Great Lakes, built the Stone Frigate in Kingston Royal Navy Dockyard to house the gear of the warships of 1812 laid up in Navy Bay. His instructions were to expedite the repair of the vessels at the bases in case of any emergency. From December 1820, the command of Flag Officer of the Great Lakes disappeared from the Navy List. In March 1824 Barrie was listed as "Acting Resident Commissioner, Kingston, Upper Canada" and his headquarters was shown to have been transferred to Kingston.

He cultivated friendships with several important political figures, and on his return to England in 1834 received a number of honours.

== Family and early life ==
Barrie was born at St. Augustine, Florida on 5 May 1774, the son of Scottish surgeon Dr Robert Barrie of Sanquhar and his wife, Dorothea (Dolly) Gardner, the sister of Sir Alan Gardner. His mother returned to England on the death of her husband in 1775, and settled in Preston, Lancashire. In 1784 she remarried George Clayton, a textile manufacturer, while her son was schooled at Neston, Cheshire, and later at Dedham. Between 1784 and 1788, he was carried on the books of HMS Europa as a servant to the captain (his uncle, Alan Gardner) but most likely his first shipboard service was as a junior midshipman on HMS Goliath.

== Vancouver expedition ==
Gardner arranged for Barrie to serve as a midshipman aboard HMS Discovery from December 1790 until 1795, during George Vancouver's voyage of diplomacy and exploration along the Pacific coast of North America. Many of his letters home survive, describing his experiences of adventure, punctuated by periods of boredom after he exhausted the books on the ships. Barrie gained an acting promotion to Lieutenant on the expedition, and commanded a survey party on the northern coast of what is now British Columbia. He was formally promoted to Lieutenant upon the return to England in October 1795. In 1800 Barrie served in the West Indies under Thomas Manby, who had also taken part in the Vancouver expedition. On 23 October 1801 Barrie received a promotion to commander, and seven months later was advanced to post-captain while commanding the 16-gun sloop Calypso.

== Later commands ==
Barrie took command of the frigate HMS Pomone in June 1806, serving initially off the French coast and then in the Mediterranean. He captured two significant Frenchmen during this period, the adjutant general of France, Chevalier Charles de Boissi, in June 1809, and Napoleon's brother Lucien Bonaparte, in October 1810, while Lucien was attempting to escape to America from Italy.

On 1 May 1811 with two other ships, he entered the Gulf of Sagone, Corsica, sank three ships and destroyed its fortifications. He was then ordered to bring the British ambassador to Persia back to England, but Pomone was sunk while approaching Portsmouth. The subsequent court-martialled for the loss of the ship acquitted Barrie of misconduct but did censure the pilot.

== War of 1812 ==
Barrie took command of the 74-gun third-rate HMS Dragon in October 1812, and sailed to America during the War of 1812. He participated in the blockade of Chesapeake Bay. He served as the commodore of the squadron for several months, and captured over 85 vessels. His squadron blockaded the Patuxent River between June and August. In September 1814 he joined Sir John Coape Sherbrooke's forces for the attack on the Penobscot River region in the American state of Maine (then part of Massachusetts). Barrie commanded a joint expedition that defeated American militia in the Battle of Hampden, capturing and looting the towns of Hampden and Bangor and destroying the frigate USS Adams. Forces under Barrie went on to blockade the Chesapeake Bay Flotilla, which was scuttled in 1814. In November 1813, ten of Virginia slave owner Thomas Whittington's slaves escaped to Dragon. The ship had dropped anchor off St. George's Island near the Maryland shore of the Potomac River, but it was also visible from the Virginia shore.

== Post-war ==
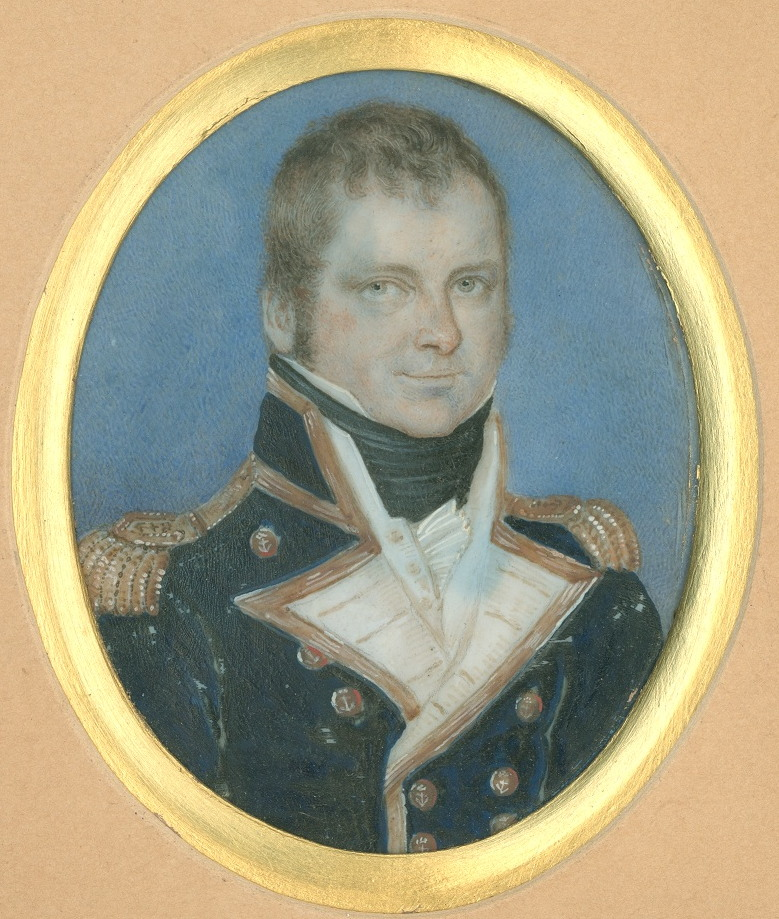
Miniature of Barrie

Barrie went onto half pay after the end of the Napoleonic Wars in 1815. He married Julia Wharton Ingilby on 24 October 1816 and went to live in France. He returned to service in January 1819, with the post of commissioner of the dockyard at Kingston, Upper Canada. The post made him senior naval officer in the Canadas, with control over the inland waterways and the port at Quebec. His instructions were to expedite the repair of the vessels at the bases in case of any emergency. He settled at Point Frederick, Kingston and among his achievements was the construction of a three-storey stone warehouse between 1819 and 1820. The building held the equipment of the ships reduced to the reserve under the Rush–Bagot Agreement of 1817. It was used briefly as a barracks, and then refitted to become part of the Royal Military College of Canada by 1876. It still survives, and is known as HMCS Stone Frigate.

From December 1820, the command of Flag Officer of the Great Lakes disappeared from the Navy List. In March 1824 Barrie was listed as "Acting Resident Commissioner, Kingston, Upper Canada" and his headquarters was shown to have been transferred to Kingston. Barrie exerted himself in a number of maritime-related matters, including the International Boundary Commission. He promoted a hydrographic survey of the Saint Lawrence River and the Great Lakes, the building of the Rideau and Welland canals, and relations with the United States. He became particular friends with a number of politicians, including Governors Lord Dalhousie and his successor Lord Aylmer, and Sir Peregrine Maitland and his wife Lady Sarah. During his later time in Canada Barrie considered the possibility of a seat on the executive councils of the Canadas, but received an unpromising response from Sir George Cockburn.

== Later life ==
Barrie returned to England in 1825 and was consulted by the Admiralty on the naval establishments and defences of the Canadas. He was subsequently promoted to commodore first class and returned to Kingston in 1827. In August 1827, the Cockburn, was commissioned as the first of the Rush-Bagot treaty gun-boats. In 1831, he was ordered by the Admiralty to sell off the old warships of 1812 and to prepare to close down the dockyard fit. He remained there until June 1834, when the inland naval establishment was abolished. In 1834, he was ordered to strike his broad pennant and pay off the Cockburn. After the St. Lawrence was sold, for $9925, the other old warships remained as hulks in the Navy Bay or "in frame" on the stocks on Point Frederick. The naval stores were sold, or sent down to Quebec for carriage to England. Barrie, a popular figure in Kingston, left for England.

He was appointed a Knight Commander of the Royal Guelphic Order and was knighted by King William IV. Barrie was promoted to rear-admiral in 1837, and in 1840 was further honoured by being created a Knight Commander of the Bath. Rear-Admiral Sir Robert Barrie died on 7 June 1841 at his seat in Swarthdale.

== Legacy ==
Barrie's time as commissioner in Canada was commemorated in a number of place-names, foremost of these being the city of Barrie, Ontario. Others include Barrie Creek in British Columbia, Barrie Point in British Columbia, Barrie Reach in British Columbia, the village of Barriefield in Ontario, and Barrie Island in Lake Huron.
