= Pennington, Hampshire =

Village in Hampshire, England

Coordinates: 50.7495°N 1.5564°W

Pennington
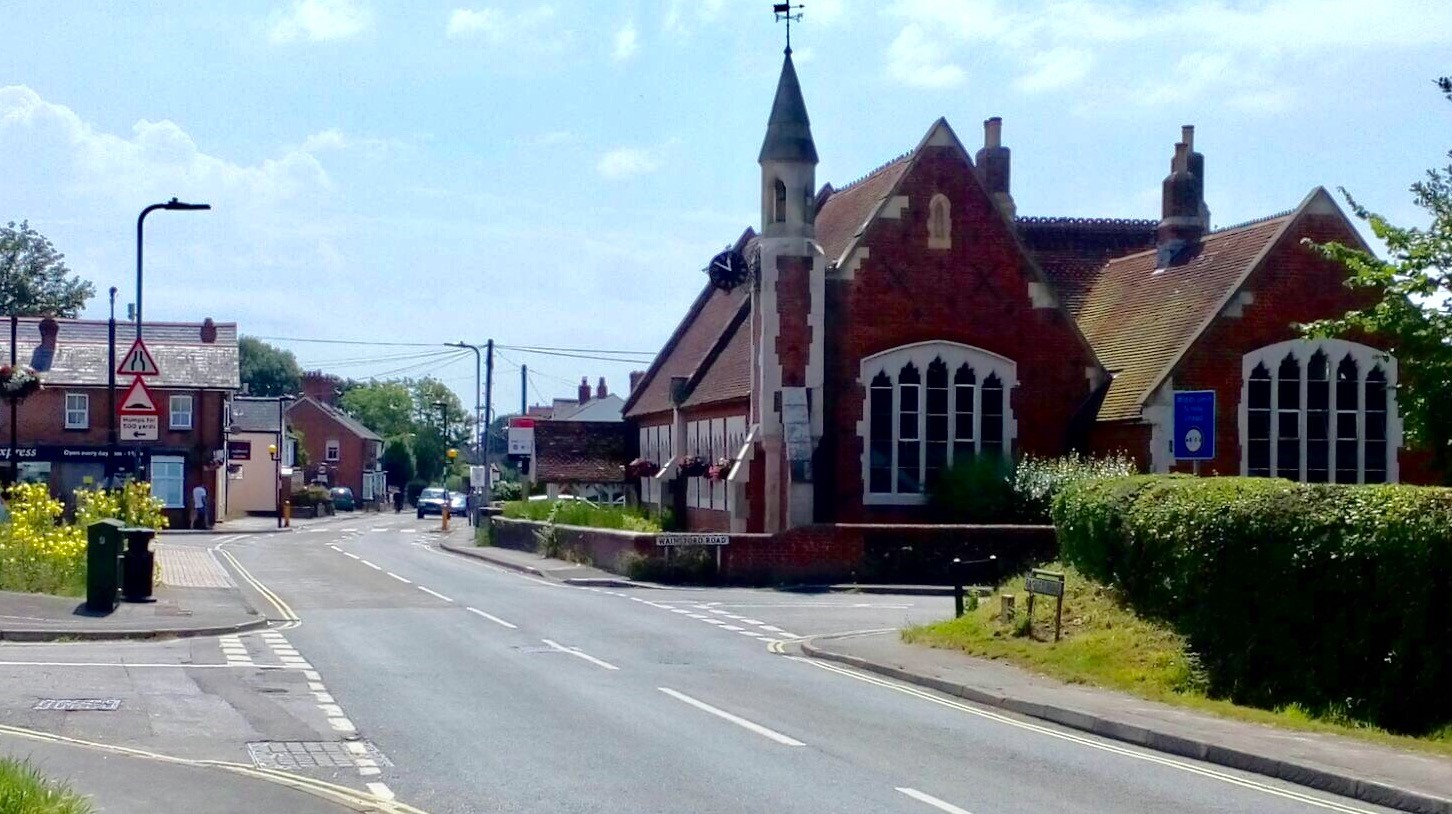
- Pennington, The Square

- Location within Hampshire
- Area: 8.79 km^{2} (3.39 sq mi)
- Population: 6,060
  - Density: 689/km^{2} (1,780/sq mi)
- OS grid reference: SZ313945
- Civil parish: Lymington and Pennington
- District: New Forest
- Shire county: Hampshire
- Region: South East
- Country: England
- Sovereign state: United Kingdom
- Post town: Lymington
- Postcode district: SO41
- Dialling code: 01590
- Police: Hampshire and Isle of Wight
- Fire: Hampshire and Isle of Wight
- Ambulance: South Central
- UK Parliament: New Forest West

Pennington is an electoral ward in the civil parish of Lymington and Pennington, in the New Forest district of Hampshire, England, which is defined based on the boundaries of the earlier manor. Pennington Village is at the centre of the ward, with Upper Pennington to the north and Lower Pennington to the south. The population taken at the 2011 census was 6,060. It is in the southernmost part of the New Forest on the Solent coastline near to the town of Lymington.

Pennington sits on the river terrace plateau between Avon Water to the west and Yaldhurst stream to the east. The Solent forms Pennington's southern coastal border. The northern border is Sway Road. The hamlet of Bowling Green is in Upper Pennington on the border with Sway.

== Geography ==
The ward can be split into three broad areas:

- Upper Pennington,
- Pennington Village, and
- Lower Pennington.

Land use in Upper Pennington is mostly agricultural and residential. Gordleton Industrial Estate is in Upper Pennington, and is home to various businesses.

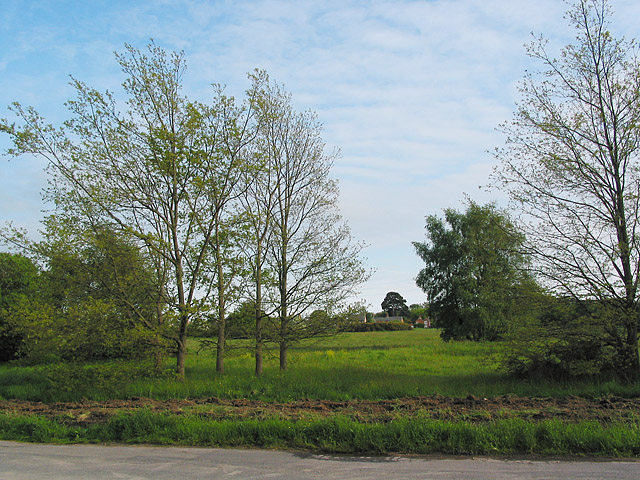
Pennington Common

Lower Pennington is home to important local infrastructure including a solar farm, a water treatment works, a recycling centre, and certain landfill sites, as well as a number of farms. Oakhaven Hospice is located in Lower Pennington.

Pennington Village is the main historical settlement and is where major residential development throughout the twentieth century was concentrated. Most of Pennington's shops are located in the village along with a majority of Pennington's schools. Pennington Village also has a leisure centre, which has a 25-metre indoor swimming pool, a sports hall, a gym, and an astro-turf football pitch.

Pennington Common and Pennington Recreation Ground are open spaces used for sports and local community events.

Pennington and Oxey Marshes, historically the largest salt pans in the area, are popular spots for bird watching, walking, fishing, photography and cycling.

Pennington Common and Upper Common are designated Sites of Special Scientific Interests ('SSSIs'). Pennington and Oxey Marshes are divided into 11 designated SSSIs (references listed below).

New Forest District Council's 2014 Local Plan and Local Plan Review propose significant development across the Upper and Lower Pennington areas. A Neighbourhood Development Plan is being drafted by Lymington and Pennington Town Council to shape that future development.

== Shops and businesses ==
Shops are centred around the square in Pennington Village, and a small parade of shops built on Fox Pond.

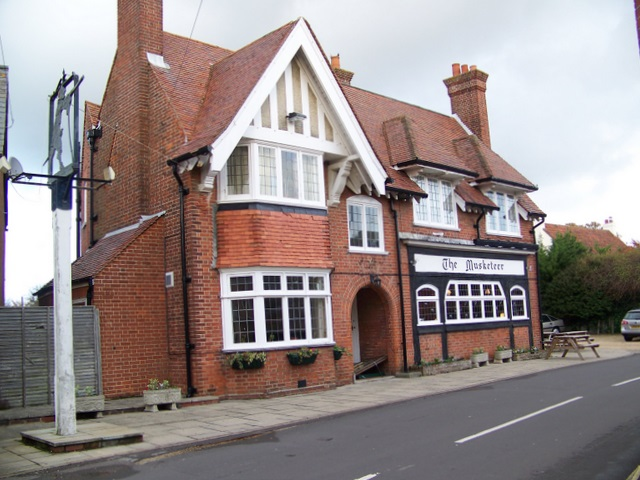
Pubs in Pennington, Hampshire

There are four public houses:

- The Wheel Inn
- The Lion and Lamb (formerly The Musketeer)
- The White Hart
- The Chequers Inn
- Pennington Sports and Social Club is located south of Pennington Recreation Ground. There are two local breweries, one of which is also a distillery.

There is a camping and caravan site in Lower Pennington. There are also bed and breakfasts and holiday cottages throughout the area.

Gordleton Industrial Estate in Upper Pennington has some larger employers. There are a number of engineering businesses. There is a petrol station at Pennington Cross.

== Schools ==
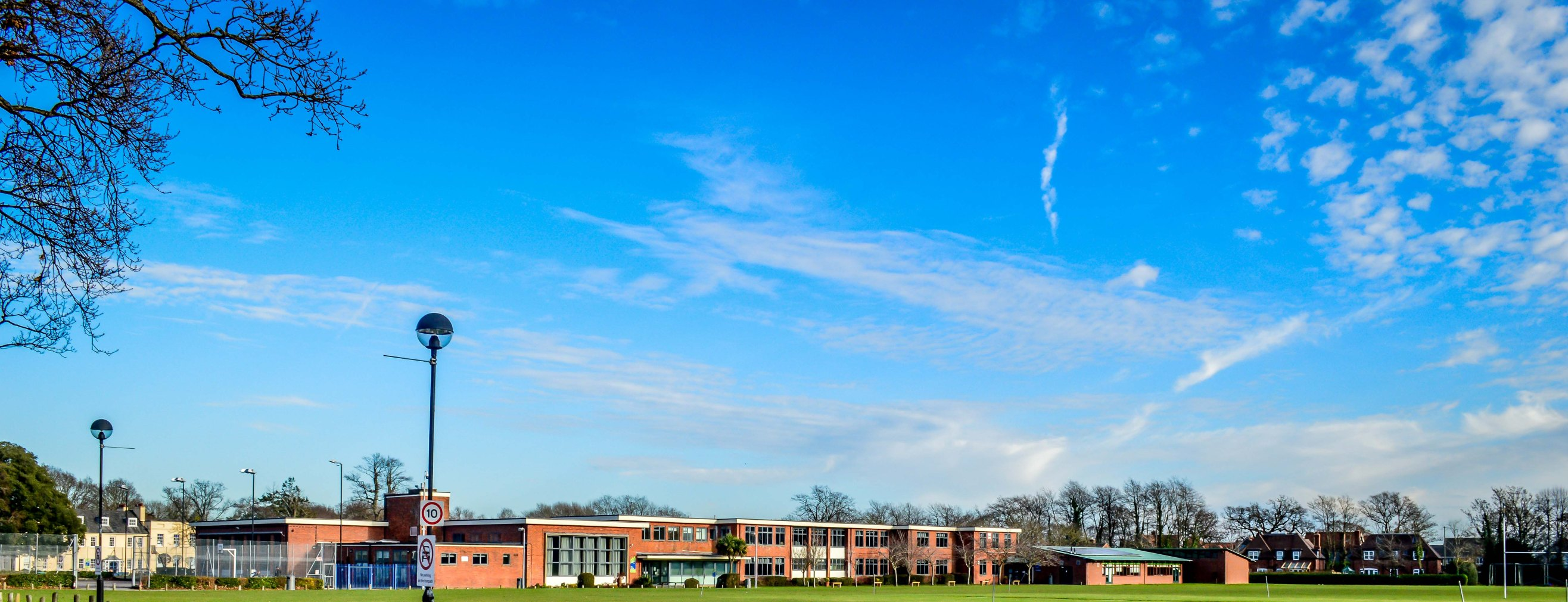
Priestlands Secondary School, Pennington, Hampshire

There are four large schools.

== Community facilities ==
The Women's Institute hall on the corner of Yaldhurst Lane was opened in 1925 in memory of Lady Nora Brand, (daughter of Sir William Conyngham Greene), the Institute's late Treasurer. In 2021, the Hall was put up for sale.

== Demographics ==
According to the 2011 census for Pennington, 49.8% of people are married, 9.9% cohabit with a member of the opposite sex, 0.6% live with a partner of the same sex, 20.2% are single and have never married or been in a registered same sex partnership, 9.7% are separated or divorced. There are 390 widowed people living in Pennington.

The top occupations listed by people in Pennington are Skilled trades 17.0%, Professional 14.5%, Caring, leisure and other service 13.7%, Elementary 12.6%, Elementary administration and service 11.2%, Managers, directors and senior officials 11.0%, Caring personal service 10.2%, Administrative and secretarial 8.9%, Associate professional and technical 8.3%, Sales and customer service 8.3%.

The religious make up of Pennington is 67.5% Christian, 23.2% no religion, 0.4% Buddhist, 0.2% Jewish, 0.1% Muslim, 0.1% Hindu, 0.1% agnostic.

469 people did not state a religion. 19 people identified as a Jedi Knight.

== St Mark's Church ==
St Mark's Church is located at the southern end of Pennington Common, within the village, and is part of the Diocese of Winchester (Church of England).

== Environment ==
=== Geology ===
The bedrock under Pennington is sedimentary and is part of the Headon and Osborne Beds. It is made of clay, silt and sand. It was formed approximately 37 to 40 million years ago in the Palaeogene Period when the local environment was dominated by swamps, estuaries and deltas.

River terrace deposits of sand and gravel were formed up to 3 million years ago in the Quaternary Period when the local environment previously dominated by rivers. Where Avon Water and Yaldhurst stream have flooded, fine silt and clay has deposited in the vicinity of the river banks forming floodplain alluvium.

Pennington sits on a broadly flat plateau with shallow inclined gullies which are the natural water courses draining to Avon Water to the west and Yaldhurst stream to the east. St Mark's Church is approximately 24m above sea level, whilst Gordleton Business Park is approximately 28m above sea level.

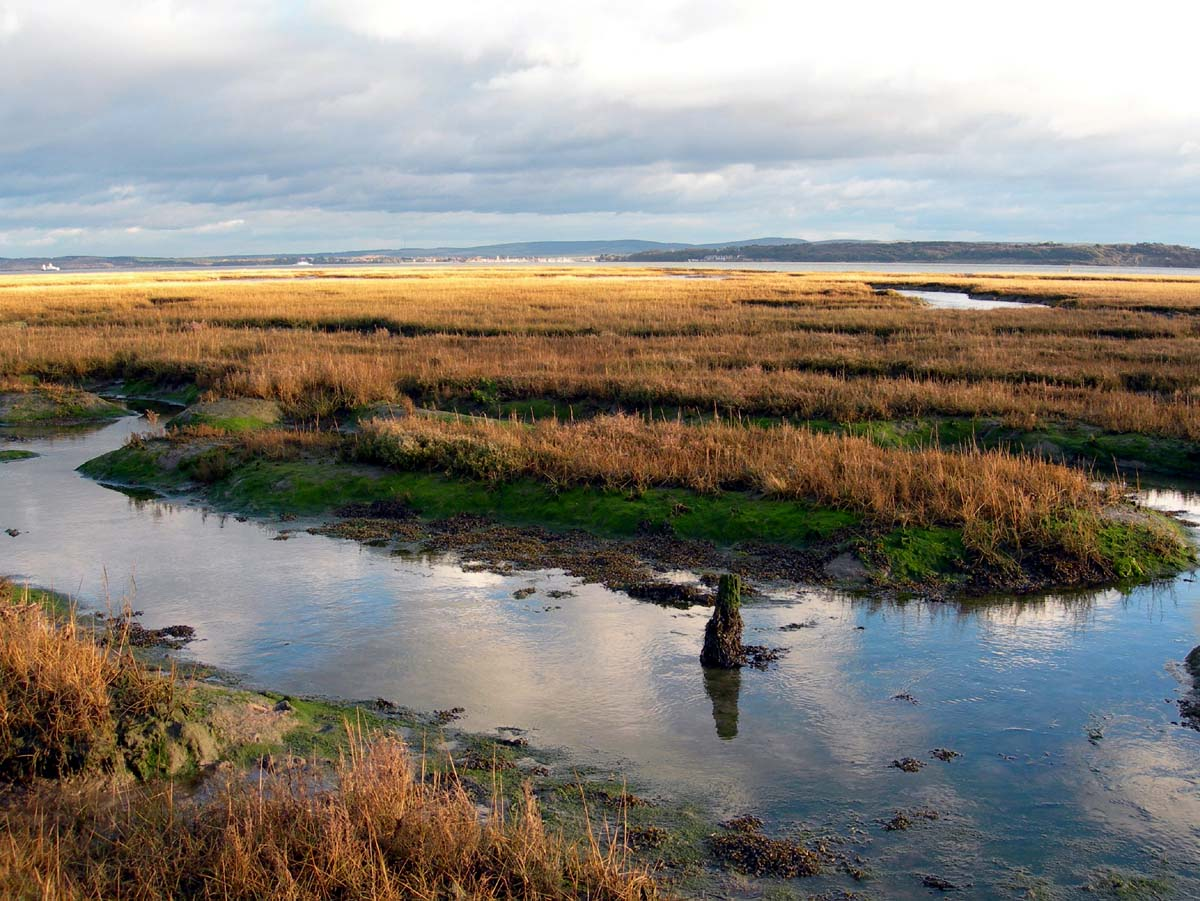
Pennington Marshes

=== Pennington Marshes ===
To the south of Pennington lie Pennington and Oxey Marshes, an area of marsh and tidal muds, formerly used as salterns for the local salt industry. These form part of the larger North Solent Marshes.

These are a favourite area for local birdwatchers and photographers, and many different types of bird have been spotted here.

The Solent Way, a regional coastal path, runs through the area atop the sea wall. There are also walking, cycling and running routes signposted, which are maintained by Hampshire County Council.

New Forest National Park Authority has planning authority over the marshes area.

The mudflats and salt marshes outside the seawall are leased by Hampshire and Isle of Wight Wildlife Trust and form their Keyhaven and Pennington Marshes Reserve.

Pennington and Oxey marshes are divided into 11 designated Sites of Special Scientific Interest (see Natural England website references 3, 4, 7, 8, 9, 10, 12, 17, 18, 19 and 23).

=== Pennington Common ===
Pennington Common and Upper Common are designated Sites of Special Scientific Interest (see Natural England website references 197, 198, and 199).

Pennington Common was rated Silver Gilt and "Common of the Year" in 2016's Britain in Bloom - South and South East.

=== Avon Water ===
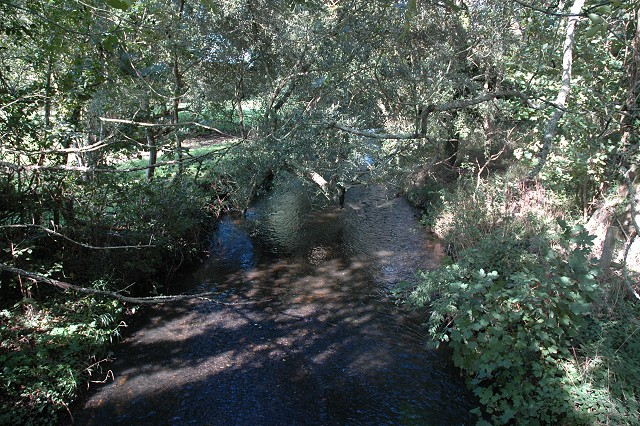
Avon Water, Pennington

The Avon Water basin is a small basin draining the south-west edge of the New Forest. It rises within the southern confines of Burley and flows eastwards where it drains Holmsley Bog. The river continues its journey following the edge of Wootton Coppice Inclosure and Broadley Inclosure where it appears to have been significantly straightened before passing the perambulation boundary. From this point it flows through farmland via Sway Lakes and passes to the western side of Pennington (forming the western boundary of Pennington) before entering the Solent at Keyhaven.

=== Yaldhurst Stream ===
Winding through the area is a small stream which issues from Yaldhurst Copse to the north and runs down a small valley across the Yaldhurst farmland. This stream has long been taken as the official defining the boundary between Buckland/Lymington and Pennington (until the point that the stream meets Stanford Hill).

== History ==
=== Prehistoric (500,000 BC – AD42) ===
In 2009 the New Forest National Park Authority with the support of the Heritage Lottery Fund, English Heritage, the Crown Estate, Hampshire County Council and Exxon Mobil based at Fawley set up the Coastal Heritage Project. The project recorded the variety of archaeology found along the New Forest coast.

Phase I (desk based investigation) and Phase II (fieldwork) projects identified over 2,900 archaeological sites within the Study Area ranging from pieces of pottery to abandoned villages and castles. In Appendix B to the report, the coastline between Milford-on-Sea to Elmers Court is evaluated, and there are several references specific to Pennington.

Archaeological records indicate that 12 early prehistoric hand axes have been found in the Pennington and Lymington area.

An excavation at Lower Farm in Pennington uncovered late prehistoric human activity (a burnt mound).

Early Neolithic human activity is evidenced in Lower Pennington by a ditch enclosure. A Bronze Age ring ditch is also recorded as having been documented, but the 2009 study did not spot it.

=== Early Historic (AD 43 – AD 409) ===
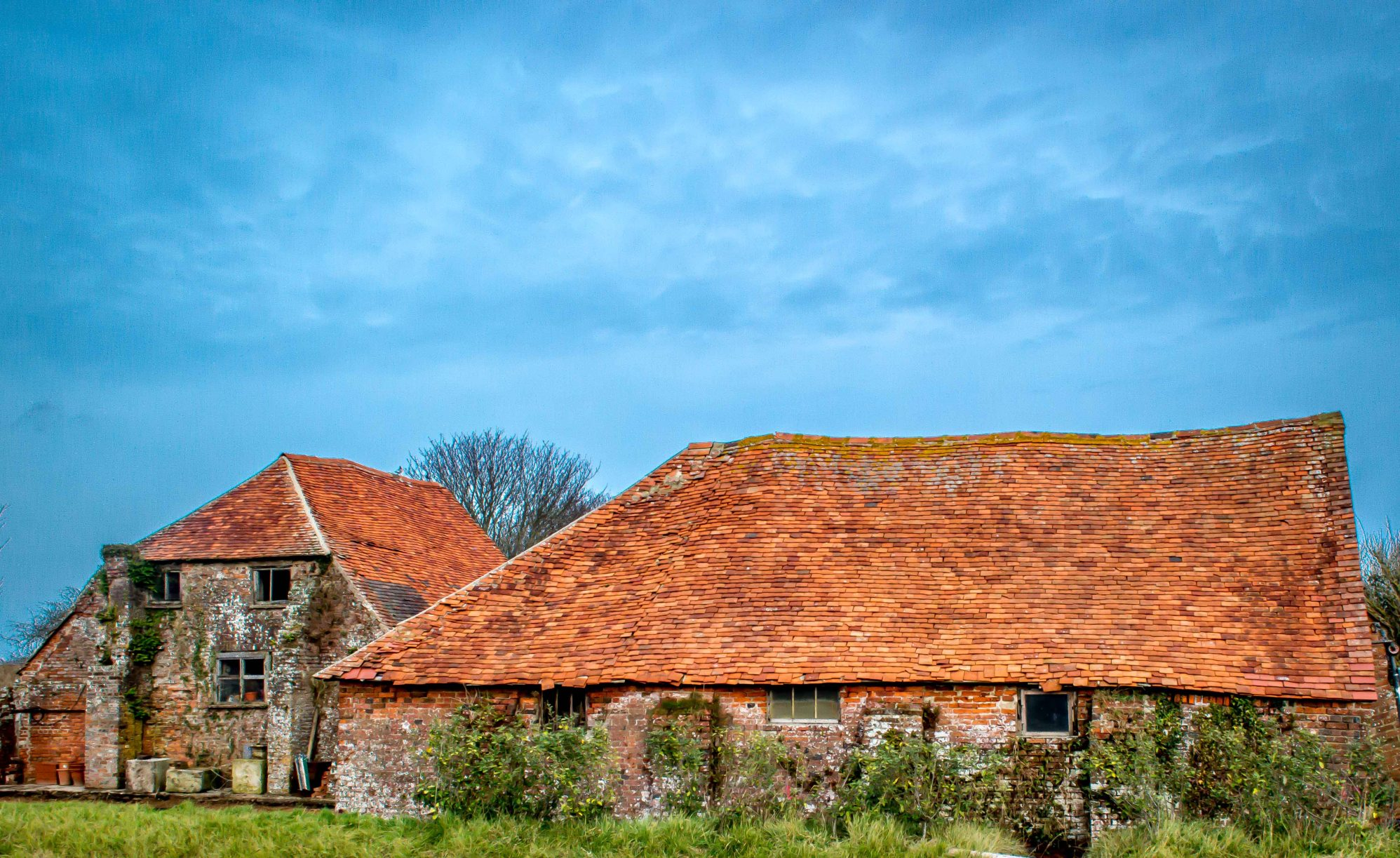
Saltworks boiling houses, Lower Pennington

The report indicates that two stone carved heads from this period were once found at Lower Farm in Pennington. However, no settlements are known except those at nearby Buckland and Ampress.

=== Medieval (AD 410 – 1539) ===
Excavations at Manor Farm in Lower Pennington found evidence of medieval settlement including hearths, ditches gullies and post holes.

Widespread food production in the Lower Pennington area is evidenced by enclosures and droveways uncovered in Lower Farm.

The report states that Oxey Marsh in Lower Pennington was the primary salt production site during the local industry's peak. More discussion of the Pennington and Oxey salt works is set out below.

=== Yaldhurst ===
The village of Yaldhurst is mentioned in the Domesday Book but it goes back even earlier than that. With Highcliff, Beckley and Hinton, it formed the New Forest ‘Hundred’, the division of the County in Saxon times supposed to contain a hundred families.

In the reign of Edward the Confessor (1003-1066), the land was held by Brixi and was assessed at five hides. In old English law a hide was a variable unit of land that was enough for a household. However the Estate of Yaldhurst (“Cildeest” 11th century) was held in 1086 by Alvric the Little or ‘Younger’.

Because of the creation of the New Forest by William the Conqueror for his hunting preserve, three Yaldhurst hides had become part of the Forest such that only two remained as meadow (presumably farmed).

Nobody knows the site of the medieval settlement of Yaldhurst but today the name is preserved in the former farmhouse of Yaldhurst (which is a listed building) and the lane leading to it from Pennington Common.

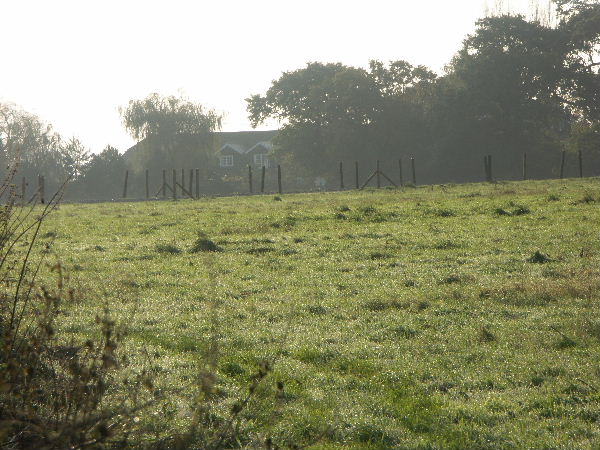
Pennington House

=== The Manors of Pennington ===
Pennington is now a separate ward within the New Forest district of Hampshire, but it was for centuries a separate manor.

The manor is recorded as Penyton in the 12th century, and as Penington in 1272. Similar place names appear across Britain following the Norman Conquest of 1066. The meaning is understood as a farmstead (or settlement/enclosure), i.e. a "Tun", that paid a penny's rent.

The manor of Pennington was held in the 13th century by the de Clares, whose descendants continued to be overlords till it passed to the Crown following the execution of the Earl of Salisbury in 1499.

John de Acton is the first recorded knight to have held Pennington for a knight's fee from the de Clare's. John de Acton was from Iron Acton in Gloucestershire, which was a manor (now also a village) that he already held.

At the beginning of the 14th century, John de Acton split the estate into three parts, conveying two of the parts to John Neyrnoit or Nervett, and keeping one for himself. John Nervett soon re-granted one of the parts back to John de Acton, but henceforth, the estate was generally divided into thirds. That which John Nervett owned became known, from the 16th century onwards, as the manor of Pennington Narvett.

=== Mills ===
Two medieval mills at Efford and Gordleton still exist as places and names.

Upper Common used to be called New Mill Common on account of the Mill that was at Wainsford just across Avon Water. This can be seen in the 1841-2 tithe map.

=== The Church and the Ecclesiastical Parish ===
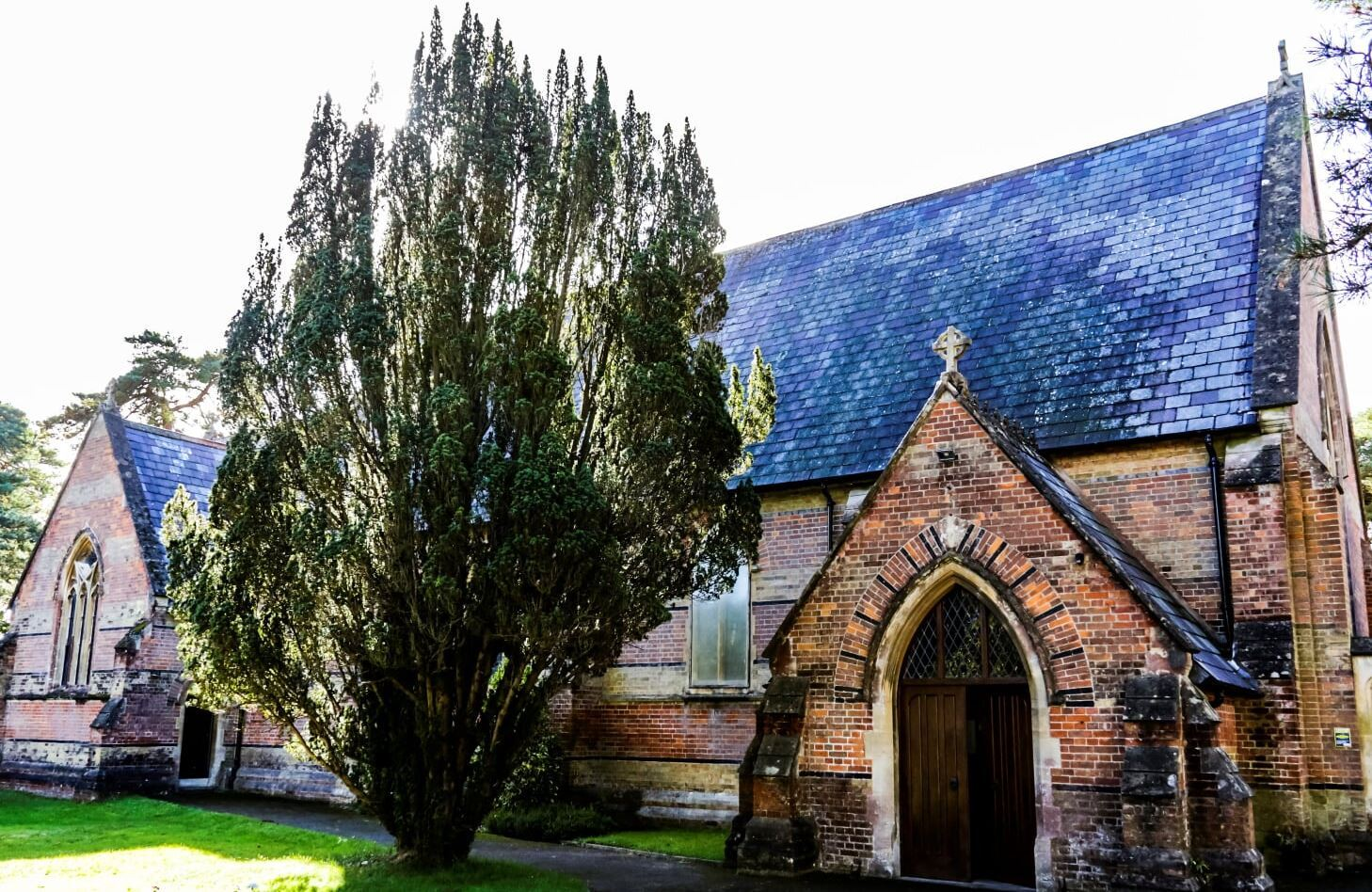
St Mark's Church, Pennington

There was also a chantry chapel at Pennington, the earliest known record of which dates from 1285. The advowson of the chapel seems to have belonged to the three lords of Pennington, and the chapel was dedicated to Mary Magdalene. The last-mentioned record of the chapel shows that it survived the confiscations of 1547–8. The first parish church in Pennington, dedicated to Saint Mark, was erected in 1839. The church was replaced with the current building around 1858–60.

=== Saltworks ===
For most of the 18th century Pennington & Lymington were the main producers of sea salt in the country. It was an industry that had existed along these shores for many hundreds of years, from at least 1217 and possibly dating back to Roman times.

There was a continuous line of salt works along the five miles of coastline from Lymington to Hurst Spit. The greatest concentration was in an area of two miles by half a mile wide situated in Oxey and Pennington marshes.

In Pennington Remembered – A Pictorial Recollection, Joan Stephens recounts that ‘there was a time that this part of Pennington was far from beautiful for.. the great local industry was the manufacture of salt. Along the marshes were the salt pans, where sea water was evaporated by the sun; and boiling houses, where day and night smoky coal furnaces made the final extraction, causing a dirty smudge on the coastline…

Philip Fallé writing in 1694, saw Pennington Marshes as “a most unhealthy place, without fresh water.. with stinking vapours and smoke that arise out of the neighbouring marshes.”

Per Stephens, the sea salt undertaking was finally abandoned in 1845 ‘when an inexhaustible supply of mineral salt could be provided from Cheshire. Thus ended a great local industry going back to very early times when in 1217 we are told the Sheriff was ordered to restore to Henry de Pont the possessions of his “customs” of salt in Pennington and Efford which had been taken into the King’s hands.’

Other commentators cite the duties imposed on sea salt as a significant contributor to the downfall of the Pennington and Lymington salt industry, and express surprise that a local industry managed to survive until 1845.

=== Smuggling ===
Up to the mid nineteenth century (c. 1845) smuggling was one of Pennington’s more lucrative industries.

Kegs of brandy would be brought by boats to the low water mark at Pennington Marshes. By rope, men would haul the kegs to shore and transport them by donkey and cart to the Common or Upper Pennington. Its understood the old marl pit on Upper Common or in nearby Bower’s Copse were favourite hiding places (Bowers Copse has since disappeared but is shown in old maps of the area).

In Pennington Remembered, Joan Stephens writes that whilst hanging washing to dry on the furze bushes (as was commonly done by women of the village to supplement their usual income) women would hide bottles of brandy in their washing baskets and use the disguise as a means of transporting it to their customers.

=== World War One, The Great War ===
“In 1914 Pennington was a small village of about 809 people living in about 202 houses. Of this small number, by the year’s end 94 men were serving in the Army or Royal Navy and by March 1915 the number was nearer 120. Given conscription, by the end of the war the number would have arisen to about 160 men in uniform.”

Pennington lost 36 men to the Great War.

Cockram, Stephens and Williams’ book, Pennington’s Sacrifice in the Great War, recounts those fellows and the parts they had played in village life. Following the Great War a section of Pennington Common was taken to enlarge the churchyard. After a public meeting it was decided to place the War Memorial in the centre of this plot. It bears the names of 27 of the Pennington men who fell in that War.

== Local knowledge ==
=== The last duel in the British Army ===
==== Background ====
Captain William Henry Souper was born in St Michaels, Barbados in 1775. He married Amelia Ann Reinagle on 3 October 1797 at St Mary, Marylebone Road, London; and fathered six children.

He began his military career in 1795 with the Royal Scots (aka “1st Regiment of Foot”), during which time he was responsible for the “recruitment of free-born blacks and slaves in the West Indies”. The 1st Battalion had been garrisoned in the West Indies from 1790 and left in 1797. As such, Souper had spent two years serving there when he joined the 2nd Battalion in the Mediterranean. Based in this timing, we understand he would have fought with them in the Battle of Egmont op Zee in the 1799 Anglo-Russian invasion of Holland, and in the 1801 Egyptian campaign at the Battle of Aboukir and the Battle of Alexandria.

In 1801, the Chasseurs Britanniques unit was formed from French Royalist emigres under the charge of British officers, and served throughout the wars. Souper joined the Chasseurs Britanniques, as an officer and later became its paymaster.

The unit served chiefly in the Mediterranean until 1811, when it participated in the later stages of the Peninsular War. It had a good record in battle but later became notorious for desertion, and was not even allowed to perform outpost duty, for fears that the pickets would abscond. Between fighting, the Regiments were stationed on the Isle of Wight and the Channel Islands, and were stationed at Lymington's Foreign Depot in 1814 before being disbanded in October of the same year.

In “Snippets from long ago in Pennington”, Joan Stephens notes that ‘during the threatened Napoleonic invasion of this country bands of Militia were camped on the common. Between 1789-1815 French emigrants began to land all along the south coast. At this time, the neighbouring town of Lymington was a dump for a turbulent and unruly mob of German, Dutch, English and French fighting units”.

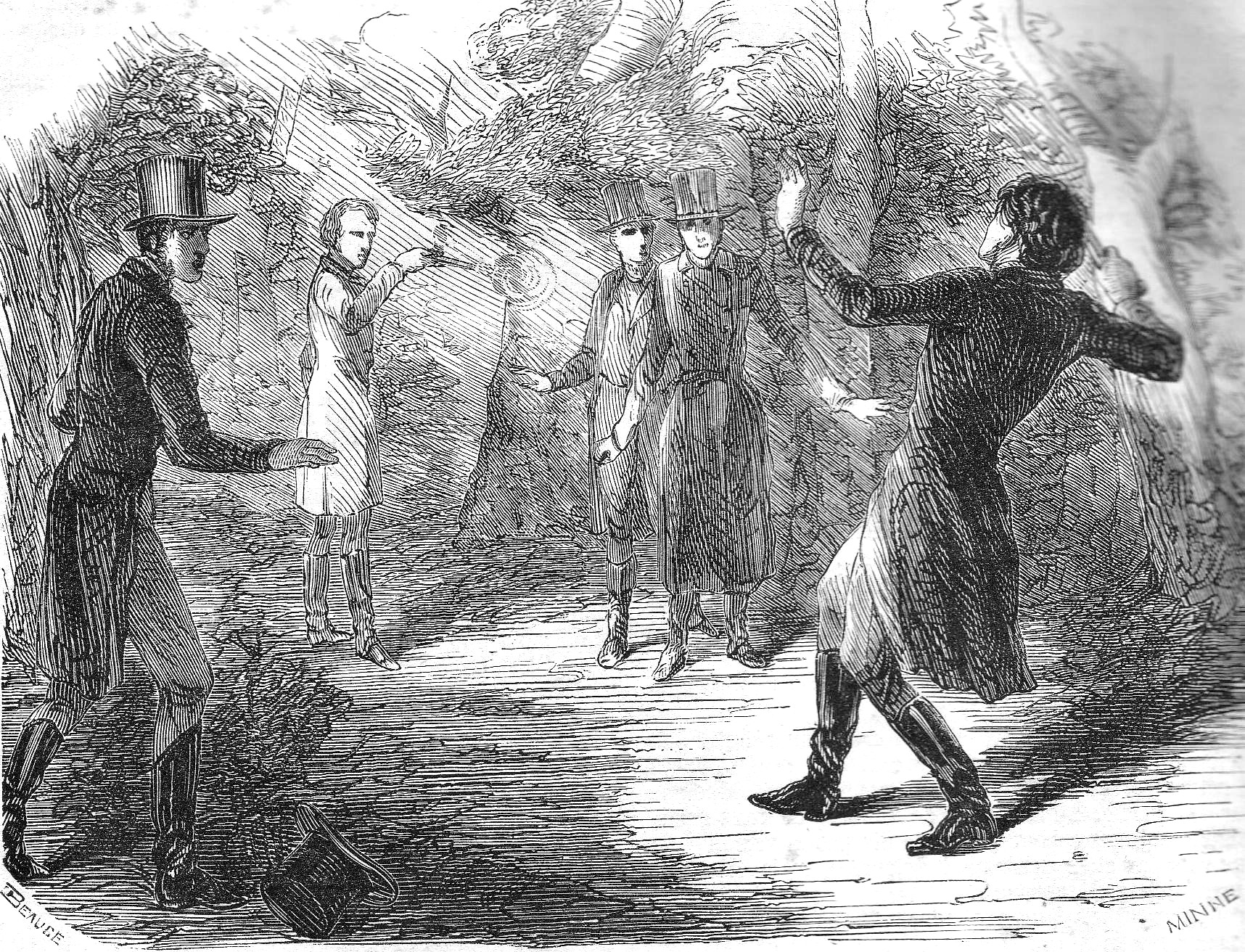
A pistol duel

==== The Duel ====
According to Souper's testimony, Adjutant Dieterich had publicly insulted him. Of course, per Souper, if he'd not offered a duel he would lose his commission! For Dieterich, to refuse a duel would be a serious blow to his manhood and reputation.

It is to be remembered that up to this point, dueling with pistols was a common way of resolving any kind of personal dispute or dishonor. In particular, the army had kept the tradition "alive" a lot longer than the public at large.

On 15 April 1814, the two duelers, armed and accompanied by their assistants, or “seconds,” to ensure a fair fight, met at Pennington Common to settle once and for the grievances that divided them.

Dieterich fired first; he missed. Then Souper took his shot. The bullet went through the hip of Dieterich into his spine; the shot was fatal.

==== The Trial ====
The trial of WH Souper was reported in newspapers across the country.

Souper was arrested and tried by jury at Winchester Assizes. The Judge Sir Justice H Dampier presided.

Souper had a wife and children and expected acquittal or short imprisonment, but the jury returned the verdict of ‘Guilty of Murder’. Souper fainted but then, ‘pathetically’, apologised, saying he had no fear death having been in battle and having faced the West Indies climate.

He protested: ‘Am I to get led to execution like the vilest felon’.

Being a gentleman himself, Justice Dampier sympathised but passed a sentence of execution. The Justice, in addressing the Jury, lamented recent cases of a similar kind in that the court had not been able to deter gentlemen in the army from the odious practice of dueling; and explained that all persons concerned in a duel, either as principals or seconds, must, in case of death to either of the parties, be guilty of wilful murder, both by the laws of God and man, in as much as it was not the rash act of a passionate moment, but done generally deliberately in cold blood.

Souper's execution was scheduled for later in the summer, being 27 August.

After the conviction and by 4 August that year, Winchester Assizes received five petitions for Souper to be pardoned from the public and the army. The petitions came from:

- 21 officers of the Chasseurs Britanniques;
- 33 Lymington inhabitants;
- 35 other officers resident at the foreign military depot at Lymington;
- 36 other officers resident at foreign military depot, Lymington;
- From Souper's sister, Mrs Alshed.

The Justice then used his powers to pardon Souper.

The last recorded duel with pistols was in 1854, but it was generally outlawed in the British army before that following the Souper trial (and other similar incidents). In Snippets from Long Ago in Pennington, Joan Stephens notes that British Army magazine ‘The Soldier’ heralded this “the Army’s last duel” in an article written by Capt. O’Donavan. Stephens also notes that the Foreign Depot in Lymington had ‘long since gone but, until 1974 – when it was destroyed by vandals, stood the grim reminder in Lymington Churchyard of the Army’s last duel – a stone erected to the memory of John Dieterich late Lieut and Adjutant of the Foreign Depot who fell in a duel on the Common at Pennington’.

What happened to Souper?

Souper continued to receive half pay until his death. His wife, Amelia, died in 1859 in Brighton, England. Their daughter, a doctor in Australia, put a notice of Amelia's death in the Australian newspapers.

In 1815, Souper's son (also William) was appointed Ensign for the York Chasseurs. Formed on 13 November 1813 from the ‘Better Class of Culprit and Deserter’ and confined aboard Isle of Wight military prison ships, this expendable corps of ‘Serial Deserters’ was dispatched to survive or die in the islands of Barbados, St Vincent, Jamaica, Grenada, Tobago and Guadeloupe, where 26 per cent successfully deserted, 30 per cent perished.

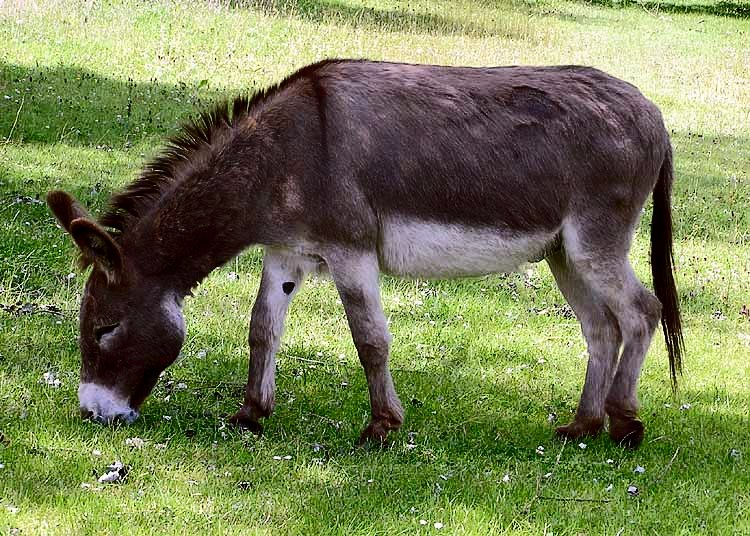
Donkeys would graze on Pennington Common

=== Donkey Town ===
Pennington was locally nicknamed Donkey Town. It is understood from local sources that this was due to the number of donkeys that would graze on Pennington Common. Donkeys were used to transport salt from the marshes to the main road.

=== Notable people ===
==== Manor owners ====
- Sir John Lisle, who also owned Ellingham manor in Ringwood, was an English lawyer and politician who sat in the House of Commons at various times between 1640 and 1659. He supported the Parliamentarian cause in the English Civil War and was one of the Regicides of King Charles I of England. He was assassinated by an agent of the crown while in exile in Switzerland.
- Giles Stibbert, who made his fortune as Lieutenant General of the East India Company and then Commander in Chief of India, before returning to the New Forest.
- George Tomline, who was the Bishop of Lincoln and subsequently Winchester, and was Private Secretary to William Pitt the Younger.

==== Other ====
- Frederick Keeping

== Governance ==
=== Local government ===
Pennington's public services are governed by two tiers of local government.

- Hampshire County Council, which is based in the county town of Winchester, administers county-wide services such as education, transport, planning, fire and public safety, social care, libraries, waste management, and trading standards. Hampshire County Council is currently controlled by the Conservative Party.
- New Forest District Council, which has its main offices in Lyndhurst and Lymington, is responsible for district-wide services such as rubbish collection, recycling, Council Tax collections, housing, and planning applications. New Forest District Council is controlled by the Conservative Party.

Lymington and Pennington Town Council assist, or are able to influence, with respect to local issues. The council has chosen to be known as a Town Council such that the Council Chairman can be called a Town Mayor.

Pennington ward can elect two councillors to New Forest District Council and six councillors to Lymington and Pennington Town Council.

=== Administrative history ===
A Milford and Pennington Parish Council was created in 1894. On 1 April 1932 Pennington became a separate civil parish, being formed from part of Milford. On 1 April 1932 the parish was abolished and merged with Lymington and became part of Lymington Borough. In 1931 the parish had a population of 1246.

Lymington Borough was subsequently abolished on 1 April 1974 under the terms of the Local Government Act 1972, becoming an unparished area in the district of New Forest, with charter trustees. The area was subsequently divided into the four civil parishes of New Milton, Lymington and Pennington, Milford-on-Sea and Hordle, whereupon Lymington and Pennington Town Council was formed.

With the establishment of the New Forest National Park Authority in March 2005, much of Pennington (all of Pennington Common and Pennington Marshes) falls under the planning and land control of the authority.

=== Other Bodies ===
New Forest National Park Authority also has planning authority over much of Pennington including the Upper Pennington area including Pennington Common, and Pennington & Oxey Marsh areas, which are within a Nature Reserve managed by Hampshire and Isle of Wight Trust.

An important role is played in Pennington's community by other bodies including the Residents Association, the Church, the Women's Institute, the Schools, and Natural England.
