= Travelers Home, California =

Travelers Home may refer to:

- Hearst, California
- Yolo, California
