= Hurst Point Lighthouse =

Lighthouse in Hampshire, England

Hurst Point Lighthouse High
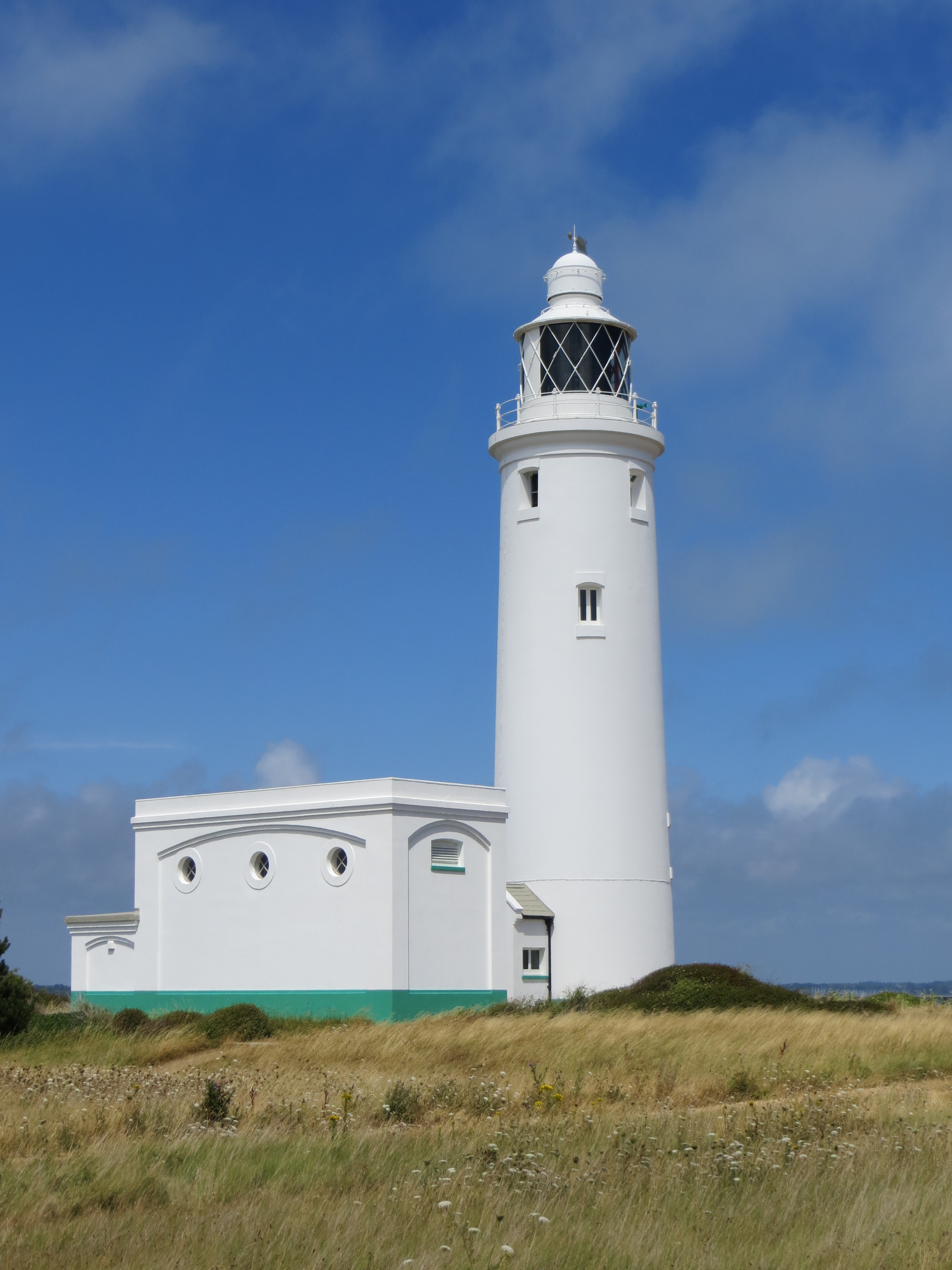
- Hurst Point Lighthouse
- Location: Hurst Spit; Hampshire; England
- OS grid: SZ3184589911
- Coordinates: 50°42′28.7″N 1°33′1″W

Tower
- Constructed: 1812 (first)
- Construction: masonry tower
- Automated: 1923
- Height: 26 m (85 ft)
- Shape: cylindrical tower with balcony and lantern
- Markings: white tower and lantern
- Operator: Trinity House
- Heritage: Grade II listed building

Light
- First lit: 1867 (current)
- Focal height: 23 m (75 ft)
- Lens: 1st order 920mm fixed lens
- Intensity: white: 7,140 candela red: 1,760 candela
- Range: white: 13 nmi (24 km) red: 10 nmi (19 km)
- Characteristic: Fl (4) WR 15s. F WRG at 19 metres (62 ft)

Hurst Point Lighthouse is located at Hurst Point in the English county of Hampshire, and guides vessels through the western approaches to the Solent.

== History ==
=== The old lights ===
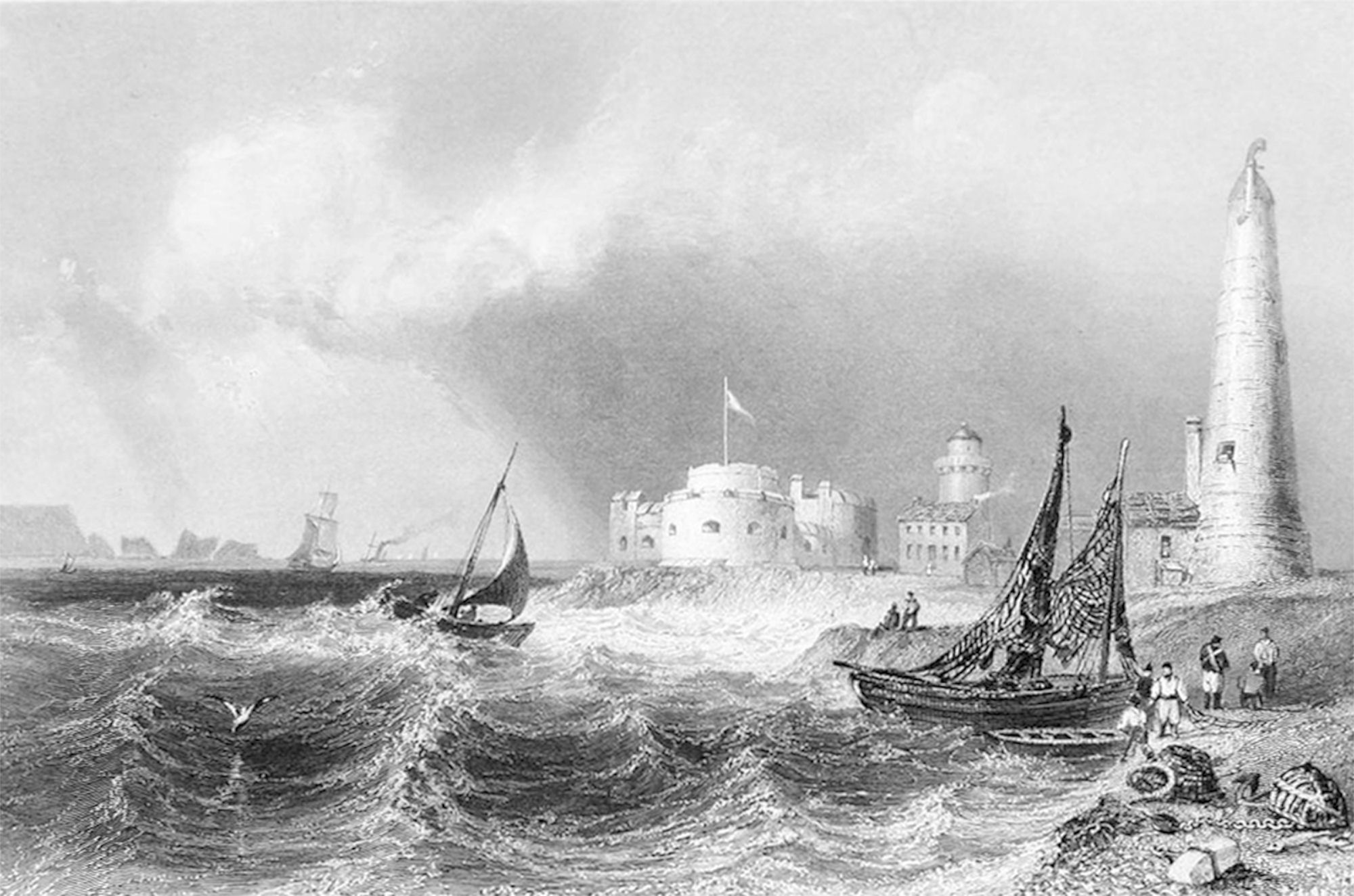
Left to right: Hurst Castle, old Low Lighthouse, old High Lighthouse (1840)

The original lighthouse was the Hurst Tower, sited to the south west of the old Hurst Castle and lit for the first time on 29 September 1786. Richard Jupp was the architect and Joseph Huddart supervised and directed its construction, which was undertaken at the same time as the erection of two other lights nearby: one on St Catherine's Down and the other on the clifftop above The Needles (it being envisaged that the three would be used in conjunction). The red, brick-built Hurst Tower displayed a fixed white light, but the north-west part of the lantern was 'darkened' to prevent it confusing vessels navigating further along the coast to the west.

The Hurst Tower light was found to be obscured behind the Needles from certain directions; consequently, in 1812, this tower was supplemented by the High Lighthouse, a new tower at a higher level. The High Lighthouse, which was designed by Daniel Alexander, was a red, brick-built elliptical tower of an unusual and striking conical design. The two towers together functioned as leading lights for vessels approaching through the Needles Channel; both were equipped with three Argand lamps and reflectors (those in the Low Lighthouse were shown from a lower window in the tower, while a separate lamp in the lantern room above was angled in the opposite direction, to guide vessels navigating along The Solent). Each tower had been built with a keeper's cottage attached.

=== The new lights ===
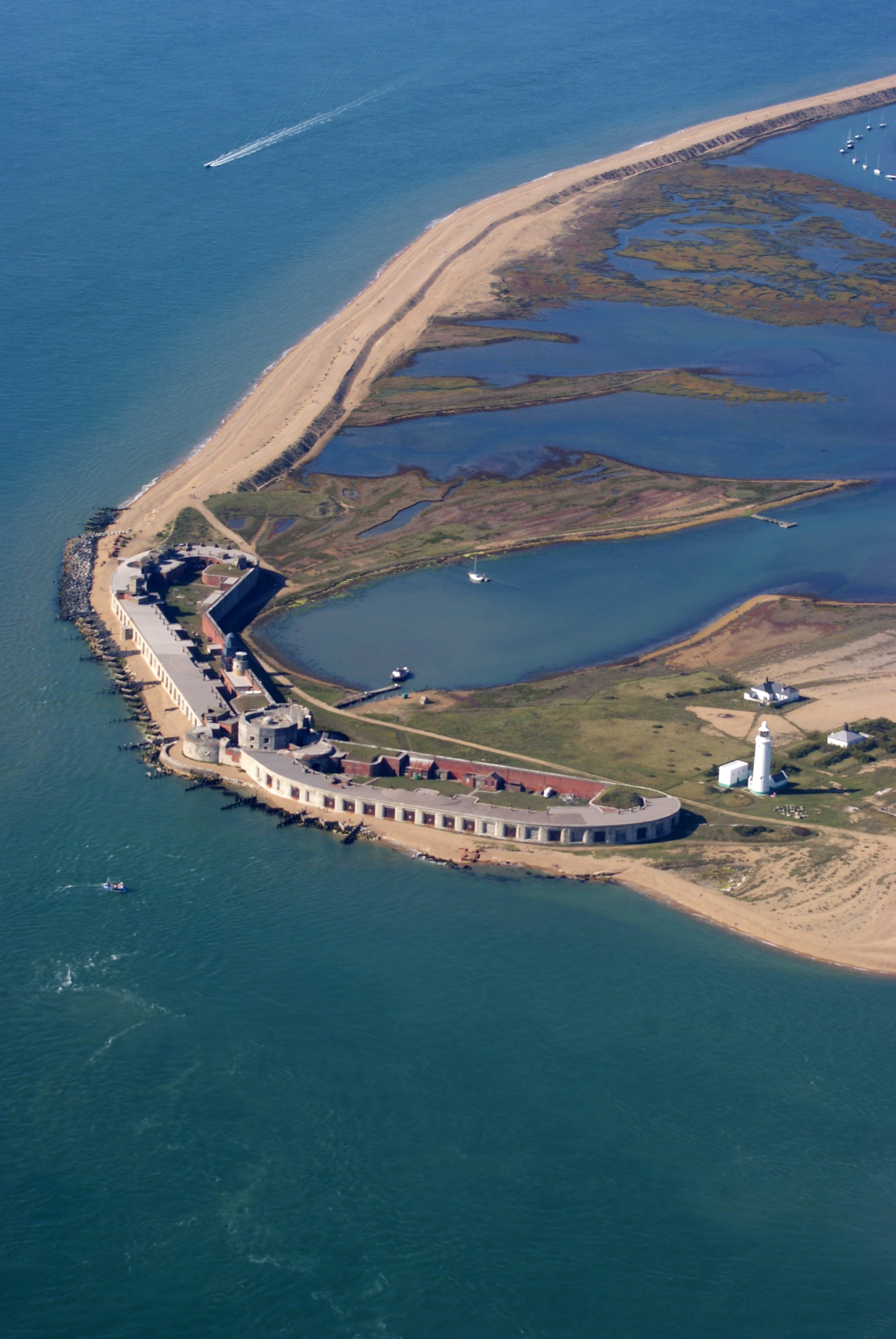
The extended castle (left) and new High Lighthouse (right) on Hurst Spit.

In light of the expansion of the Castle between 1865 and 1873, it proved necessary to replace the two lighthouses. In 1865, a new Low Light was built: a white circular granite tower with a red lantern, which was attached to the new curtain wall of the castle; then, in 1867, a new High Light was built to designs by James Douglass: a freestanding 26 metre tower (which, in order to maintain the transit in relation to the channel, was positioned 15 metres to the east of the old High Light). Only the top of the Low Light was visible, but a red screen was positioned outside the walls of the fort as a day-mark, so as to make the tower look 'apparently complete' when the lighthouses were in line. The lights displayed were similar to those of the old towers, but the light directed up the Solent now shone from the High rather than the Low lighthouse.

In the 1890s the High Light was provided with a complex new array of fixed first-order Fresnel lenses, together with a Douglass-designed six-wick lamp. According to contemporary plans, displayed in the nearby museum in the castle, the 'new' lenses were in fact old lenses reused from elsewhere: one panel 'taken from the first order dioptric apparatus formerly used at St Catherine's' and one 'taken from the central portion of the old Bishop's Rock apparatus', both of which had been replaced a few years earlier. (Three sets of upper prisms were also re-used from St Catherine's.) One panel was positioned on the south-west side of the lamp and aligned with the Low Light to provide the transit guiding passage through the Needles Channel; the other was positioned on the east side of the lamp to guide vessels approaching via The Solent, with a red sector in addition marking a hazard, Solent Banks. In the intervening arc (i.e. between the outer Needles Rock and Sconce Point) the faint light of the naked flame of the lamp was left visible (at a later date a much smaller optic was incorporated to cover this arc). Together with the dioptric array, a complex occulting mechanism was installed, which eclipsed the light for two seconds every ten seconds whilst maintaining a fixed light over the arc of the transit with the Low Light.

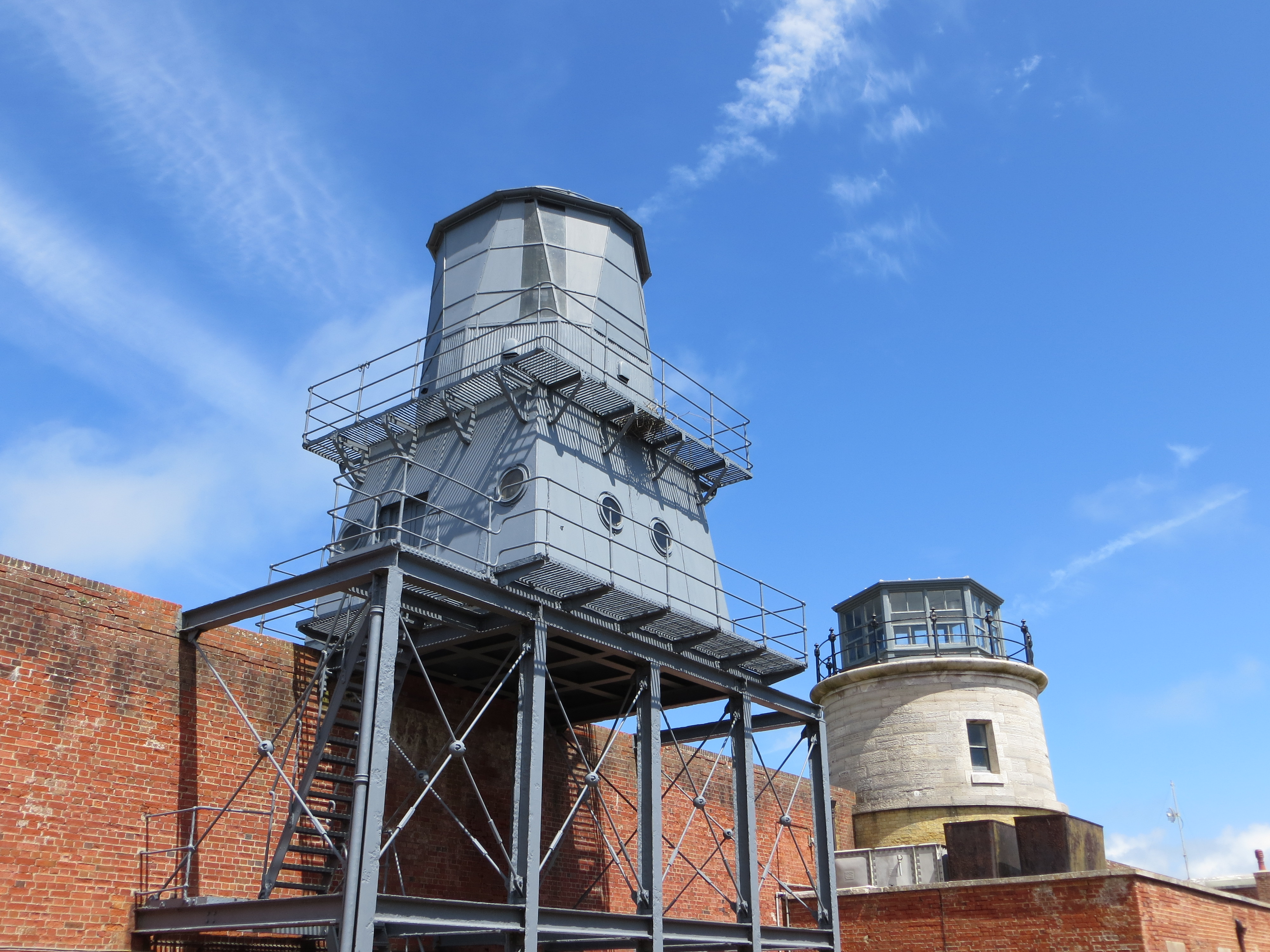
The Low Lights of 1911 (left) and 1865 (right) within the west wing of Hurst Castle.

By 1911, shifting sandbanks had left the Low Light out of line with the channel. It was therefore replaced with a red square metal tower, mounted on steel joists alongside the castle wall to enable it to be moved laterally so as to adjust to future changes. It too was fitted with a first-order lens. By now the towers were lit by incandescent oil burners. In 1923 both lights were automated with the installation of an acetylene lamp controlled by a sun valve, fuelled from an adjacent producer plant. (The producer plant, which generated the gas using rainwater and calcium carbide, was decommissioned in 1968; stores of bottled gas were subsequently provided by Trinity House vessels.)

Electric power was provided at the lighthouse in 1997. Due to increased use of the shipping lanes, a high-intensity sector light (designed to be seen day and night) was installed in one of the lower seaward-facing windows of the High Lighthouse, adjustable in case of further shifts in the sandbanks and using white, red and green light to mark with precision the narrow passage between the Needles and the Shingles Bank. This removed the need for a leading light, and the Low Light was therefore decommissioned that same year.

== Present day ==
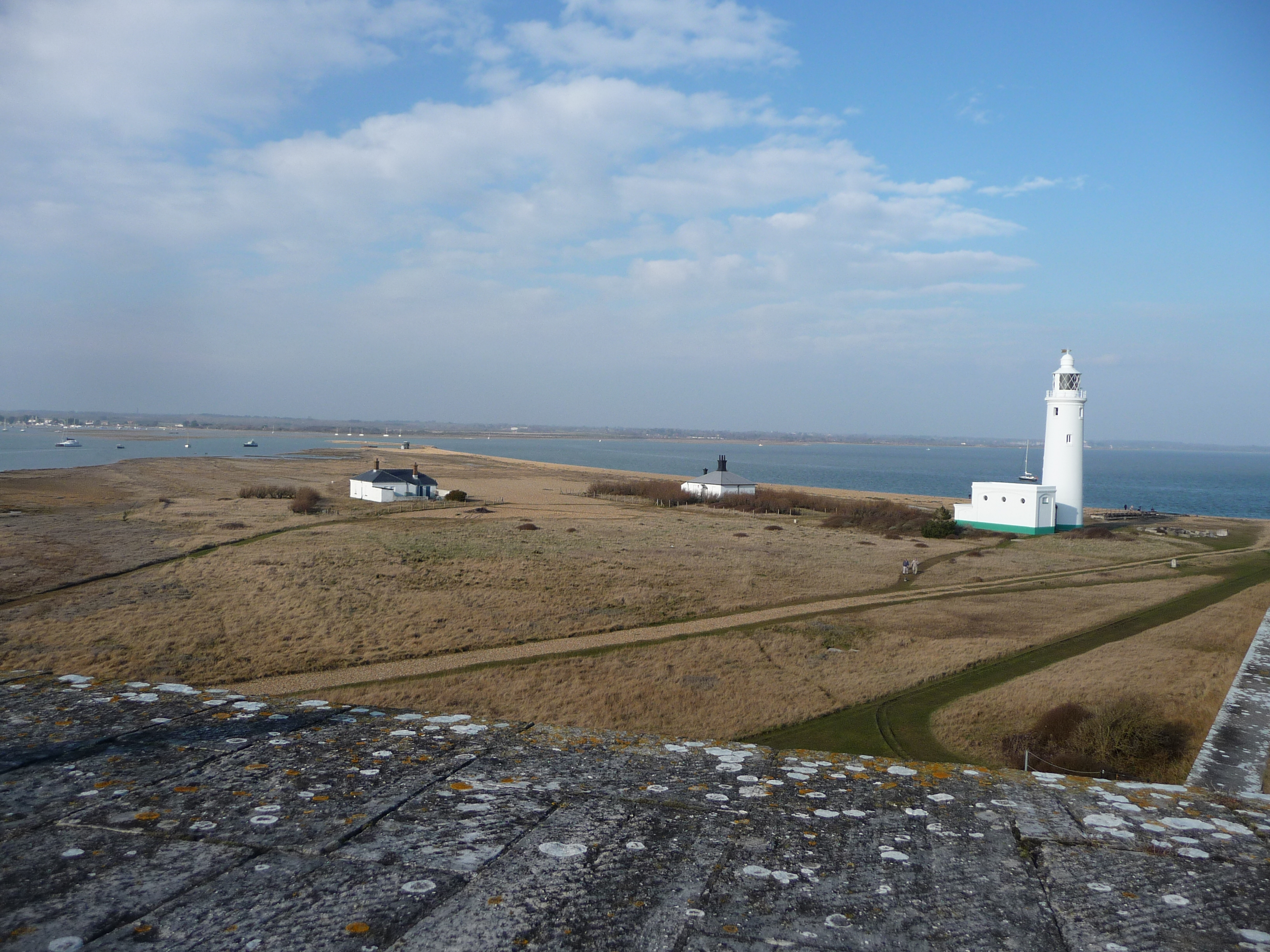
The lighthouse, and former keeper's cottage, viewed from the castle.

The High Lighthouse is still working today, having been converted from acetylene to electric power in 1997. In addition to the high-intensity sector light, the old dioptric apparatus, with its different focal lengths and red sector, remains in use in the lantern. In November 2020 the main lamp was converted to LED for better reliability, efficiency, lower maintenance and improved visibility.

Now known simply as Hurst Point Lighthouse, the tower is not open for visitors and cannot be reached by car; access is by foot or boat only. The decommissioned acetylene producers have been preserved in situ and the old acetylene burner array is displayed in one of the lighthouse museum rooms in the castle. A small lighthouse-related museum is maintained by the Association of Lighthouse Keepers in the casemates of the castle.

Both the 1866 and the 1911 Low Lights, though decommissioned, remain in place: (painted grey to camouflage them and prevent confusion for mariners). The 1911 lantern still contains its old lamp and lens.

== See also ==
- List of lighthouses in England
