= Lymington and Pennington =

Civil parish in New Forest, Hampshire, England

Lymington and Pennington is an administrative area formed in 1974 in the New Forest district of Hampshire, England. It covers the historical settlements of Pennington village and Lymington Town, as well as smaller hamlets, and newer residential areas.

== Lymington and Pennington Town Council ==
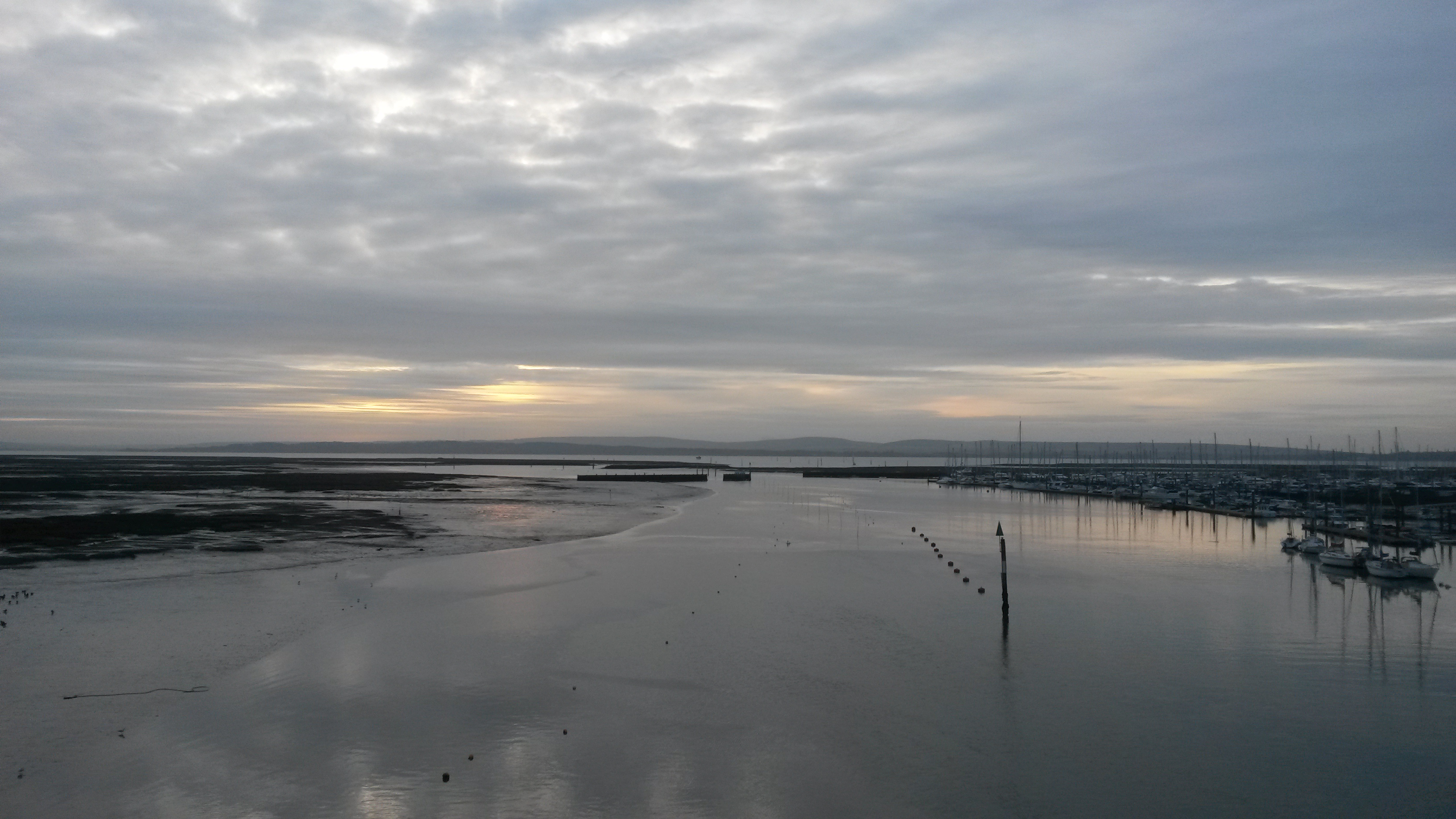
Lymington River

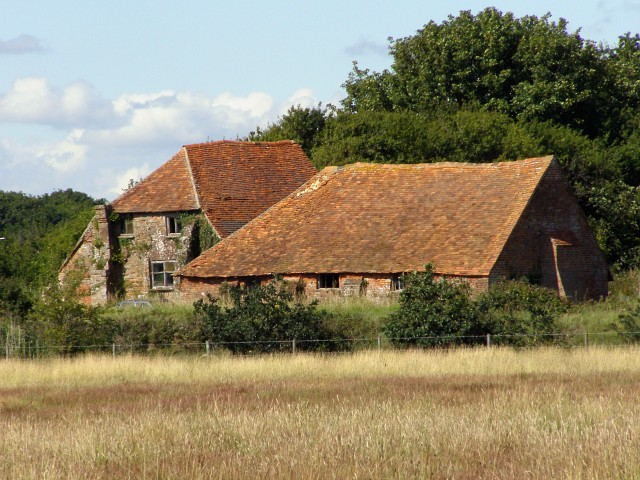
Pennington marshes, Salt boiling houses

A parish council (which has chosen to call itself a Town Council so that it may have a Mayor rather than a Council Chairman) is elected by residents of the Lymington and Pennington administrative area.

== Local Government Elections ==
The whole Lymington and Pennington administrative area can elect one County Councillor to Hampshire County Council.

For New Forest District Council elections (as well as local parish elections), Lymington is split into Lymington Town and Buckland such that there are three wards in total:

Ward name	Key Statistics, Census 2011	Seats on New Forest District Council	Seats on local parish council
Pennington:	Population: 6,060 Households: 2,676	2	6
Lymington:			
Lymington Town	Population: 5,884 Households: 3,006	2	6
Buckland	Population: 3,501 Households: 1,638	1	3

== History ==
The histories of Lymington Town and Pennington village are documented on their separate pages.
