= Keyhaven, Pennington, Oxey and Normandy Marshes =

Saltmarshes in Hampshire, England

Coordinates: 50.728°N 1.556°W

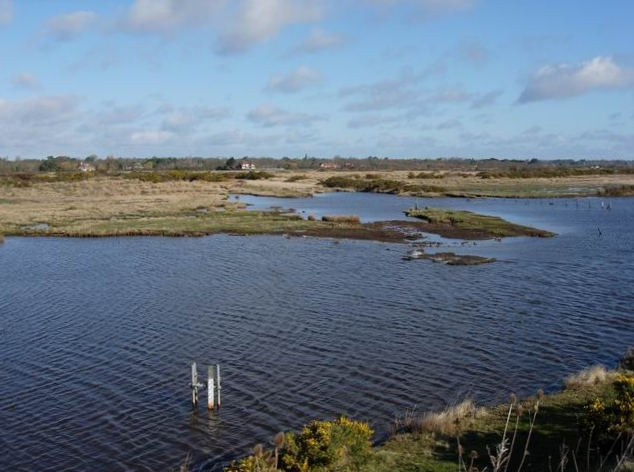
Pennington Marshes

Keyhaven, Pennington, Oxey and Normandy Marshes, also known as the North Solent Marshes, are three areas of saltmarsh in Hampshire, England. The haven outpost of Milford-on-Sea, Keyhaven sits to the west, the village of Pennington to the north, and the town of Lymington to the northeast. The marshes lie behind Hurst Spit and fall within the Hurst Castle And Lymington River Estuary Site of Special Scientific Interest.

== History ==
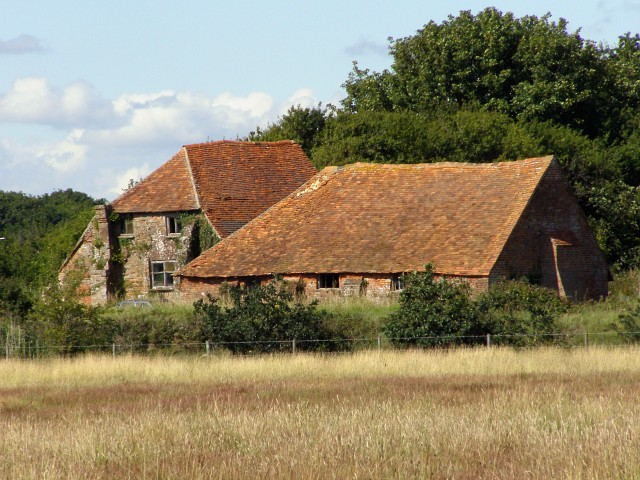
18th-century salt boiling house

The marshes were once used as salterns for the thriving salt industry. The salterns are first mentioned in 1132, and continued in use until 1865. They were replaced by oyster beds, but are now disused marshland with some enclosing banks. A circular mound 1.2 metres high and 12 metres across is all that remains of a mill, and there is another mound with an overgrown brick structure and rectangular pond of unknown date. Just north of the marshes, in Lower Pennington, are several 18th-century salt boiling houses.

== Nature reserve ==
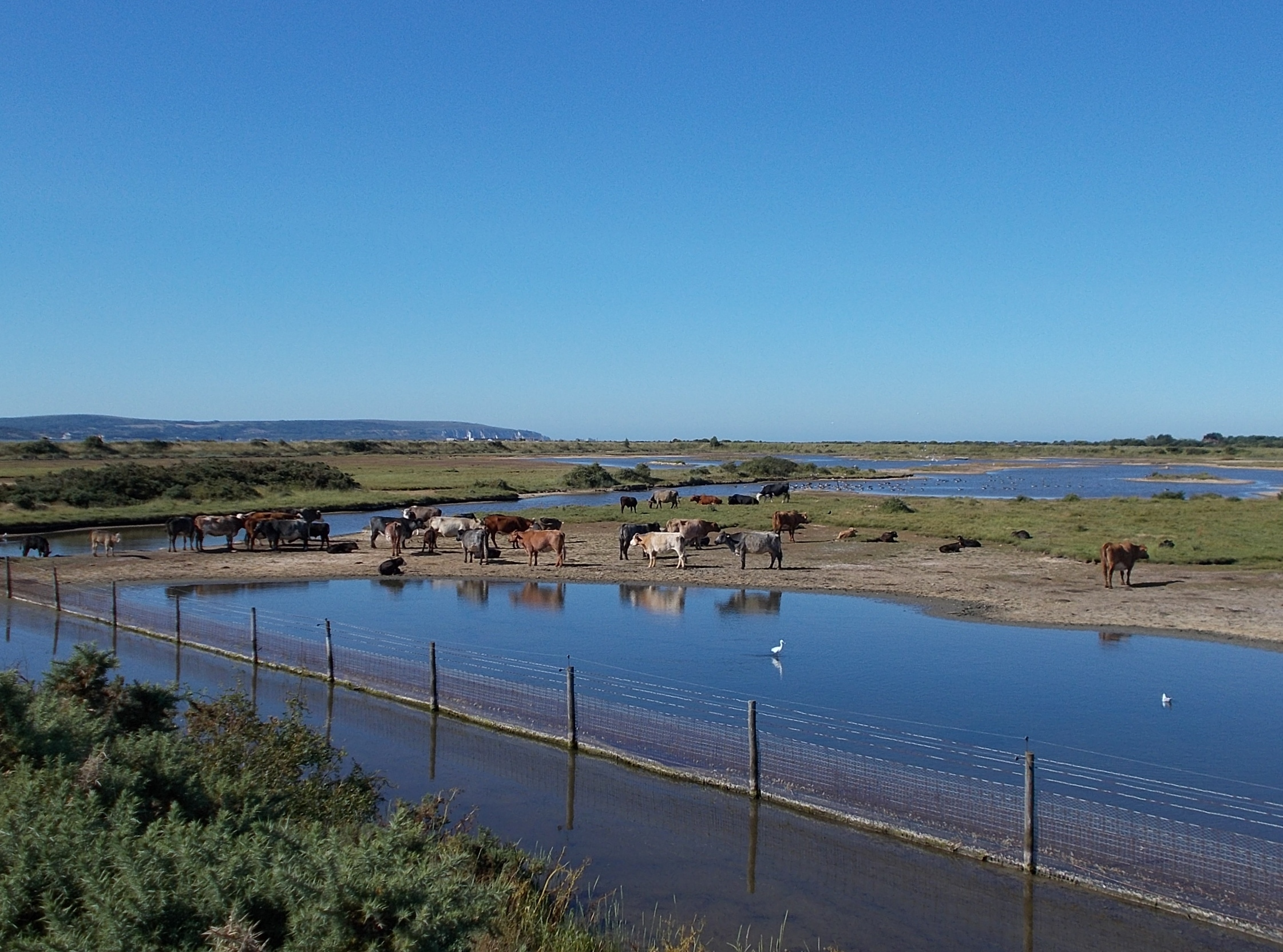
Cattle grazing on Normandy Marsh

The marshes are a site of special scientific interest and an area of outstanding natural beauty. They are part of the New Forest National Park, and in summer are grazed by cattle and ponies owned by New Forest commoners. Part of the marshes behind the sea wall are a local nature reserve managed by Hampshire County Council. Part of the intertidal mudland is also a nature reserve. The marshes and tidal muds offer a variety of wildlife habitats, which are important for gulls and terns in spring/summer and waders and wildfowl in autumn/winter.

At Pennington Marshes, there are several lagoons, situated just inside the seawall – at the western end is Fishtail Lagoon, and the east of that Butts Lagoon.

A number of rare vagrant birds have occurred at the marshes including a stilt sandpiper in 2002, and a lesser sand plover in 2003.
