= Avon Water, Hampshire =

River in Hampshire, England

Avon Water
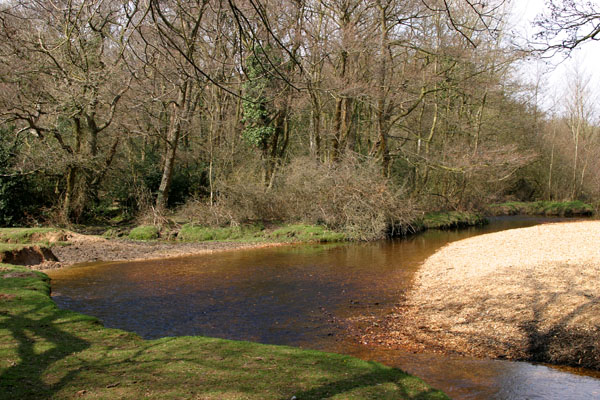
- Avon Water, in the New Forest

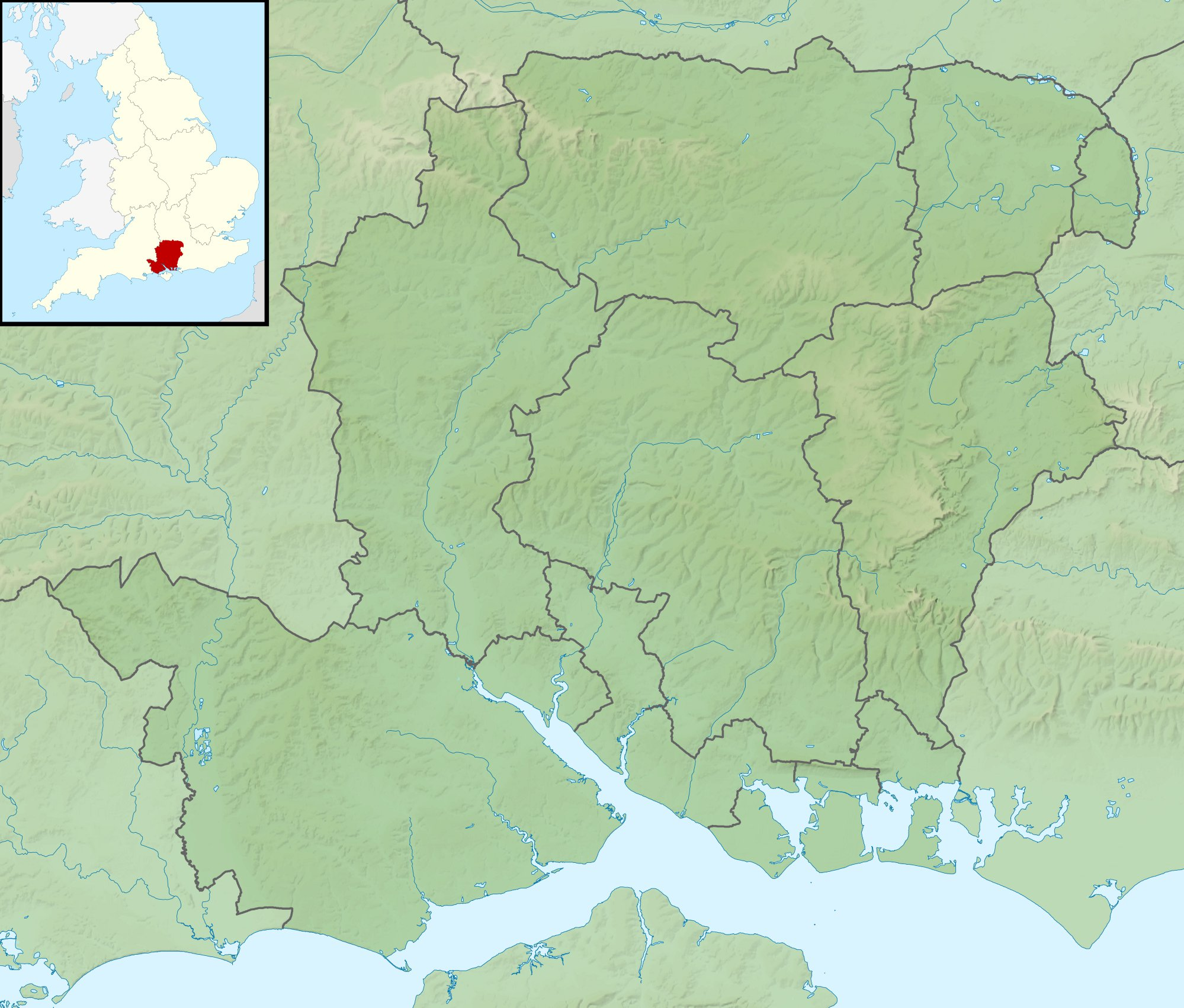
- Location within Hampshire

Location
- Country: England
- County: Hampshire
- District: New Forest

Physical characteristics
- Source
  - location: National Park heath immediately south of Burley
  - coordinates: 50.815°N 1.722°W
  - elevation: 51m
- Mouth
  - location: Keyhaven, Hampshire
  - coordinates: 50.724°N 1.564°W
  - elevation: 0m
- Length: 14.5 km (9.0 mi)

Basin features
- Progression: Avon Water, sea
- River system: Avon Water basin

Avon Water (Note: Often preceded by "the") is a small river draining some of the southwest of the New Forest in Hampshire to The Solent. West of the upper part of its archetypally dendritic drainage basin, which has formed due to the forest's heath soil, is the due south, much larger River Avon, rising in Wiltshire.

== Context ==
It is the smallest of three rivers (properly so called) which drain all but the north, west and east edges of the New Forest. These flow south into the Solent: with the Lymington River then Beaulieu River, the furthest east. It rises at many sources close to, south of, Burley, and, quite minutely ribbled in places, curves from south-east to south over its course of 9 miles (14.5 km). It flows into the Solent at Keyhaven, close to the shingle bank that leads to Hurst Castle.

The name thought to have been little-used or communicated outside of certain social circles; yet it dates from at least the 1790s. It is labelled on Thomas Milne's map of Hampshire published by William Faden in 1791. Cary's New Itinerary of 1810 also gives its name but confounds it with the stream ending at Keyhaven Harbour immediately to the west of the lower part (the Dane(s) stream draining Ashley, Hordle, and Milford).

Notably it drains the populous railway village of Sway.

== Notes and references ==
Footnotes

Citations
