= Keyhaven =

Hamlet in Hampshire, England

Coordinates: 50.722863°N 1.569420°W

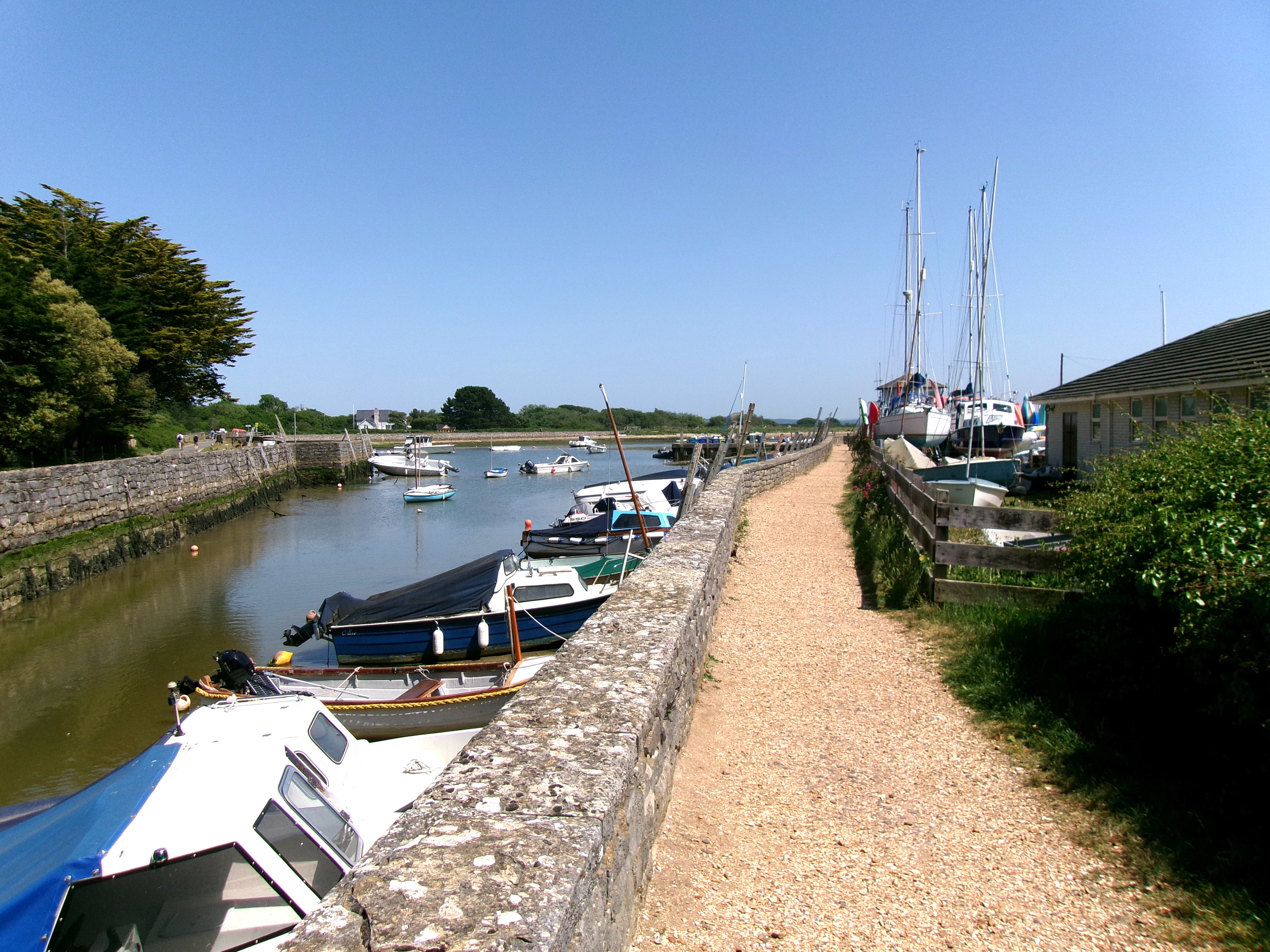
- Keyhaven harbour

- Location within Hampshire
- OS grid reference: SZ3049091559
- District: New Forest
- Shire county: Hampshire
- Region: South East
- Country: England
- Sovereign state: United Kingdom
- Post town: Lymington
- Postcode district: SO41
- Dialling code: 01590
- Police: Hampshire and Isle of Wight
- Fire: Hampshire and Isle of Wight
- Ambulance: South Central
- UK Parliament: New Forest West

Keyhaven is a hamlet on the south coast of England in the county of Hampshire. It is a fishing village, but the trade has been in decline for a period of years and its main draw now is tourism, especially sailing.

== Overview ==
Keyhaven lies in the district of the New Forest and is just within the borders of the New Forest National Park. It is in the civil parish of Milford-on-Sea, and it lies at one end of the shingle bank known as Hurst Spit which leads to Hurst Castle. Keyhaven draws visitors through its outstanding natural beauty, from the views over the Solent to the abundance of open farm land. To the east of Keyhaven lies the nature reserve of Keyhaven marshes.

== History ==
The name "Keyhaven" means 'Harbour where cows are shipped'; from the Old English cū (genitive cȳ) + hæfen. Cattle and sheep were transported from the Isle of Wight to the water meadows of the Avon around Christchurch.

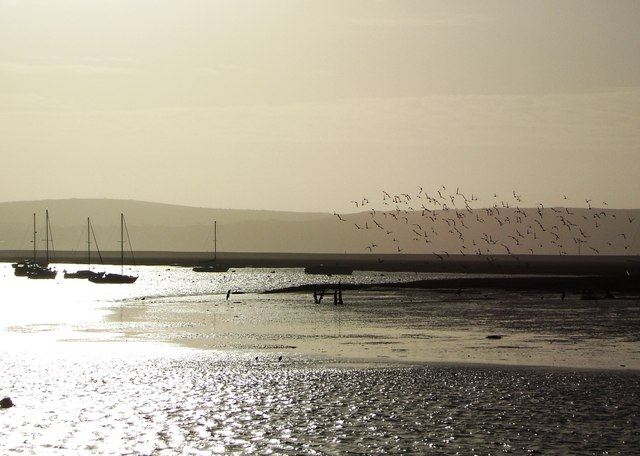
Winter sunshine at Keyhaven

Keyhaven was a port as early as 1206. There seem to have been two manorial estates here, one held by Bath Abbey, and the other by the Bishop of Salisbury. The lands of Bath Abbey were held by them until the time of the Dissolution, but in the 17th century it seems that the two manors were merged, and in 1802 the estate was purchased by Sir John D'Oyly. He subsequently sold it and by the 19th century it had passed, like other lands in the area, to William Cornwallis-West.

Like the rest of the West Solent area, a considerable salt industry developed soon after the Conquest. This had disappeared by 1400 but was revived in the 17th century with the introduction of new techniques.

Pier and Harbour Order (Keyhaven) Confirmation Act 1936
- Act of Parliament
- Parliament of the United Kingdom
- Long title: An Act to confirm a Provisional Order made by the Minister of Transport under the General Pier and Harbour Act 1861 relating to Keyhaven.
- Citation: 26 Geo. 5 & 1 Edw. 8. c. lxxxi

Dates
- Royal assent: 31 July 1936

Other legislation
- Relates to: General Pier and Harbour Act 1861

Text of statute as originally enacted

In the 1930s a proposal was made to run a car ferry between Keyhaven and Fort Victoria on the Isle of Wight. An act of Parliament was obtained, the Pier and Harbour Order (Keyhaven) Confirmation Act 1936 (26 Geo. 5 & 1 Edw. 8. c. lxxxi), but a lack of funds meant the proposal was abandoned in 1938.
