= Hurst Spit =

Shingle bank near Keyhaven, England

- Spit
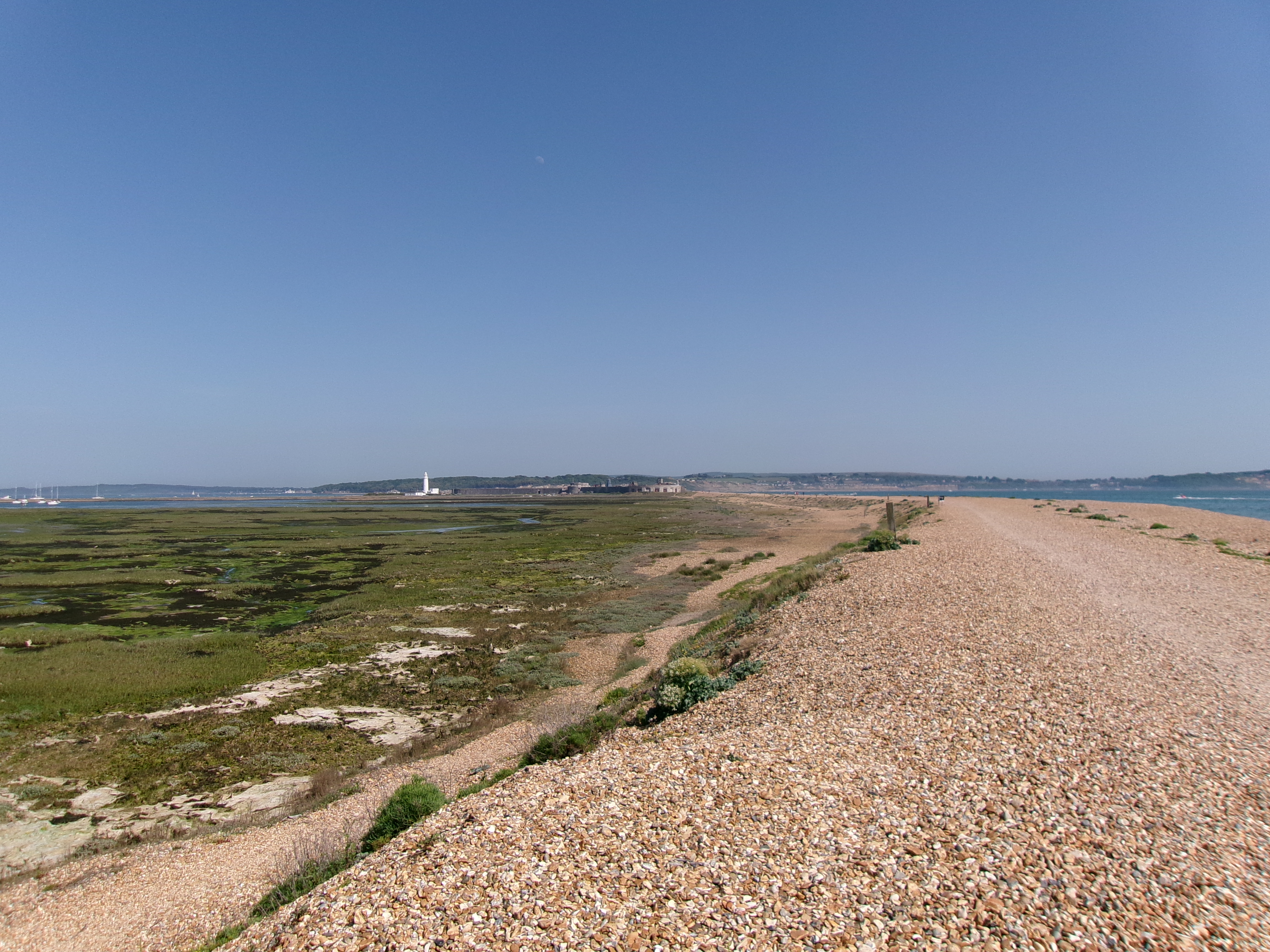
- Hurst Spit, looking south-east towards the lighthouse and castle

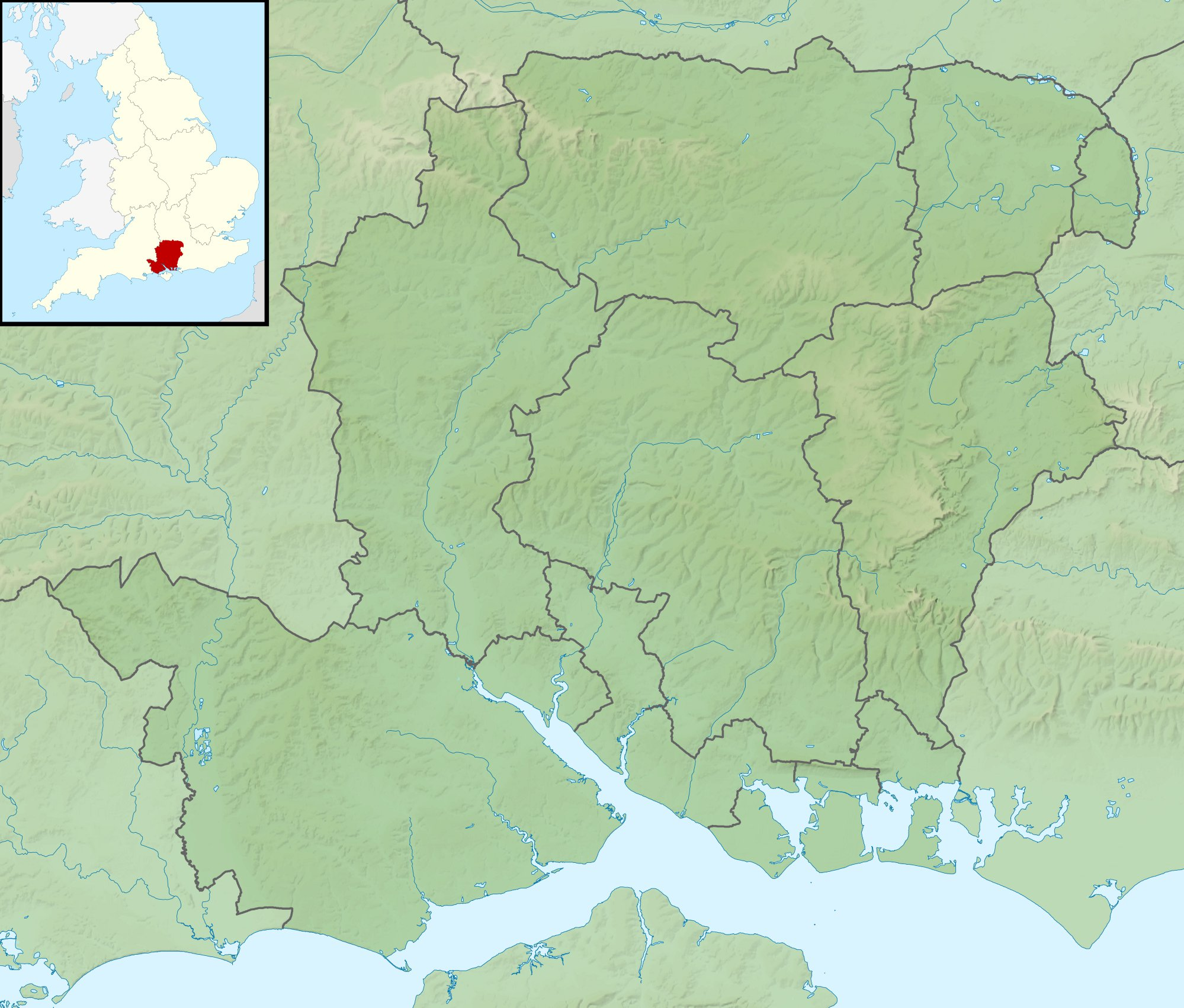
- Location within Hampshire
- Coordinates: 50.7063°N 1.5511°W
- Grid position: SZ316897
- Location: Hampshire, England

Hurst Spit is a one-mile-long (1.6 km) shingle bank near the village of Keyhaven, at the western end of the Solent, on the south coast of England. The spit shelters an area of saltmarsh and mudflats known as Keyhaven and Pennington marshes. At the end of the spit is Hurst Castle, an artillery fortress originally built on the orders of King Henry VIII, and much enlarged in the 19th century. Hurst Point Lighthouse was built on the end of Hurst Spit in the 1860s.

== Geography ==
Hurst Spit is a hook-shaped shingle spit which extends for 1.4 miles (2.25 km) from the Hampshire shore into the Solent towards the Isle of Wight. The spit forms a barrier which shelters a Site of Special Scientific Interest known as Hurst Castle And Lymington River Estuary. To reach the end of the spit one can either catch the seasonal ferry from Keyhaven, or follow the footpath (part of the Solent Way) along the top of the spit.

The sea route past Hurst Spit can be hazardous to boats because the constriction to the tidal flow caused by the spit creates strong tidal streams, as well as spiky waves mixed with circular areas of flat sea caused by the upwelling water. In addition a sand bar, known as The Trap, sticks out 60 m (200 ft) into the Solent just east of the round tower of Hurst Castle.

Storms regularly uncover unexploded ordnance on the spit, some dating back more than a century. Soldiers stationed at the castle used to practice the firing of shells.

== Geology ==
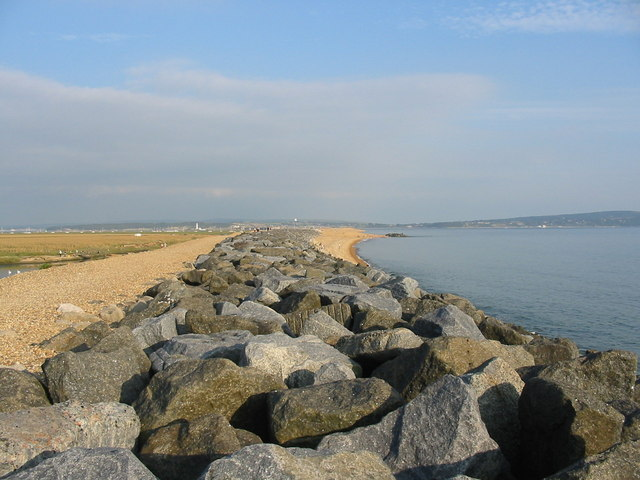
Larvikite rocks shipped from Norway now defend the start of the spit

The spit formed from loose flint pebbles which had been eroded from the cliffs further west. Although originally formed by natural processes, Hurst Spit has been declining in volume, probably since the 1940s when coast protection works in Christchurch Bay first began to interrupt the flow of the shingle towards the spit. In 1989 the spit was so weakened that it was danger of being permanently breached. A stabilisation scheme took place in 1996-7. This scheme rebuilt the shingle bank using dredged shingle, and saw the building of a new rock revetment utilising larvikite rocks shipped from Norway at the western end of the spit and near the castle. The spit has to be replenished from time to time, most notably in the aftermath of the 2013-14 UK winter storms when New Forest District Council had to rebuild and reinforce parts of the spit. The spit no longer has its original natural appearance and looks "more like a railway embankment."

Fossils from the Barton Beds were at one time a common sight amongst the gravel, but are now rare. In the 1830s deposits of bitumen were also noted on the spit, and in 1840 there was even an attempt to establish a bitumen factory. The origin of the bitumen is unknown, but it may be that the spit accumulated natural floating deposits of bitumen.

== Wildlife ==
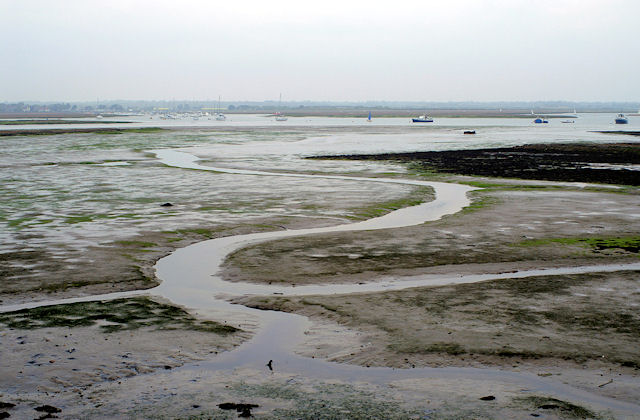
Keyhaven Marshes

Hurst Spit supports an important community of saltmarsh plants especially sea purslane (Halimione portulacoides); glasswort (Salicornia species); annual seablite (Suaeda maritima); and golden samphire (Inula crithmoides).

Behind the spit is an area of saltmarsh and mud flats known as Keyhaven and Pennington marshes. The marshes contain a variety of wildlife especially birds, invertebrates, and plant life. There are colonies of black-headed gulls and dunlins, and many wading birds including oystercatchers, ringed and grey plovers, and redshanks.

Glanville fritillary butterflies have been reported on the spit probably only as wind blown individuals.

== History ==
The name "hurst" is thought to be a Middle English dialect word meaning "sandbank", which is derived from Old English "hyrst" indicating a hillock or eminence. Little is known about Hurst before the castle was built, although it seems to be mentioned in a document dated 1434 which refers to a wreck off "Hurst".

=== Hurst Castle ===
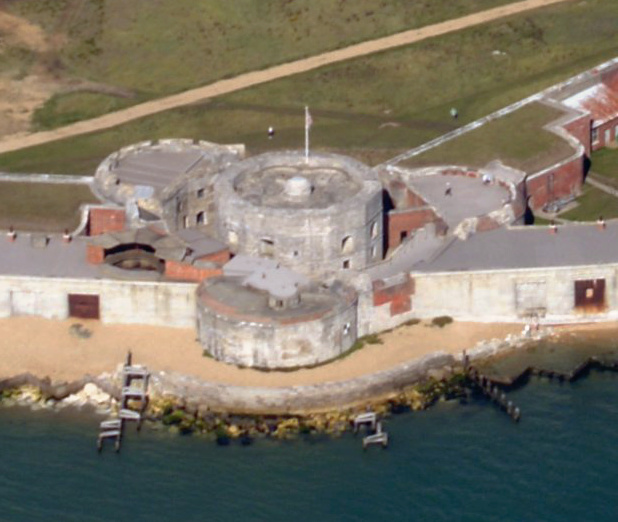
Hurst Castle

Hurst Castle was built between 1541 and 1544 by Henry VIII as part of his network of coastal defences to protect England against French and Spanish invasion. Hurst Castle was established to defend the western entrance of the Solent. During the English Civil War the castle was occupied by parliamentary forces and at the end of 1648 Charles I was held prisoner in the castle. The castle was enlarged in the 1860s, and two large wing batteries were built to house heavy guns. Soldiers were stationed at Hurst Castle as recently as World War II.

=== Lighthouses ===
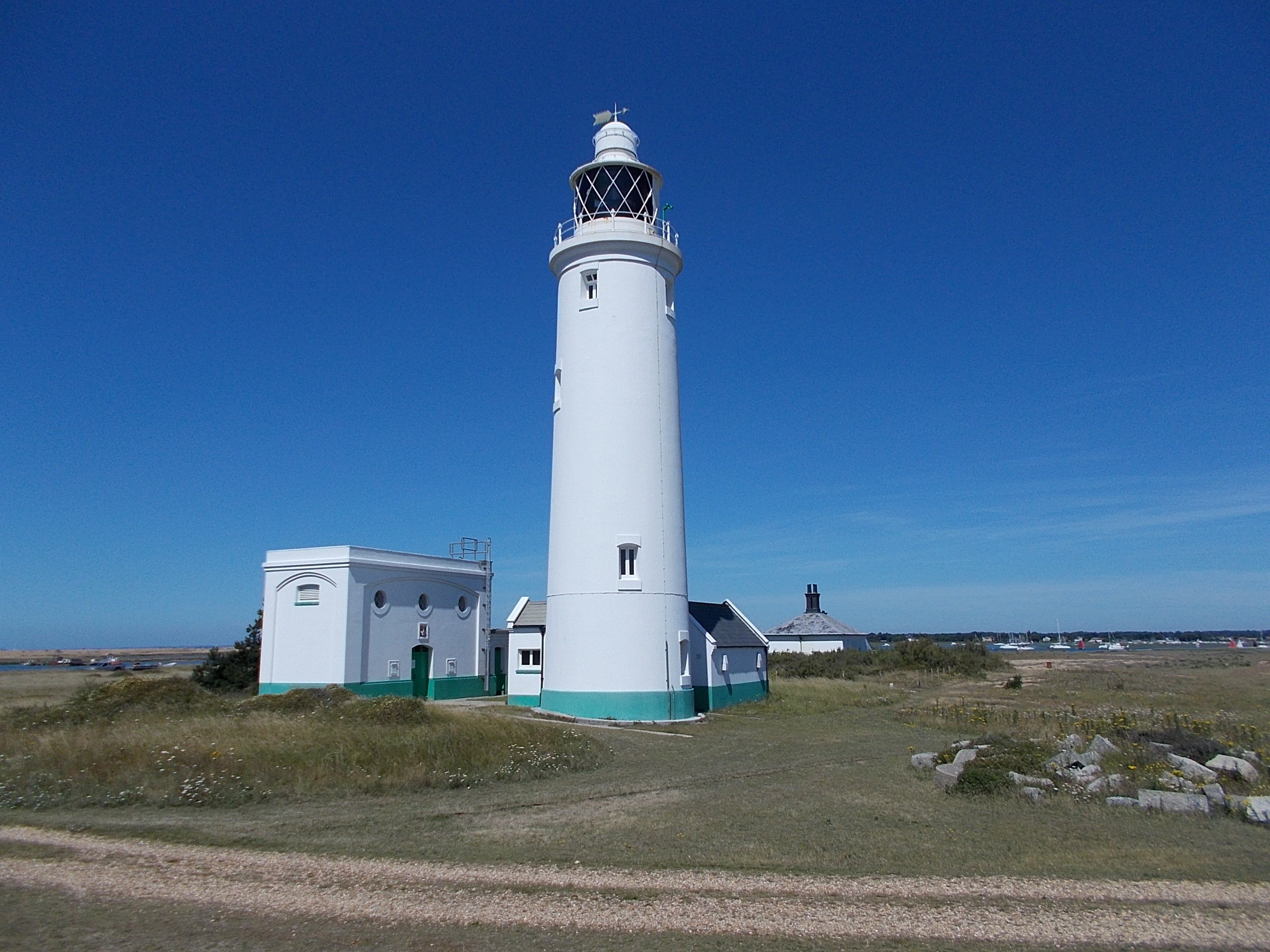
Hurst Point Lighthouse

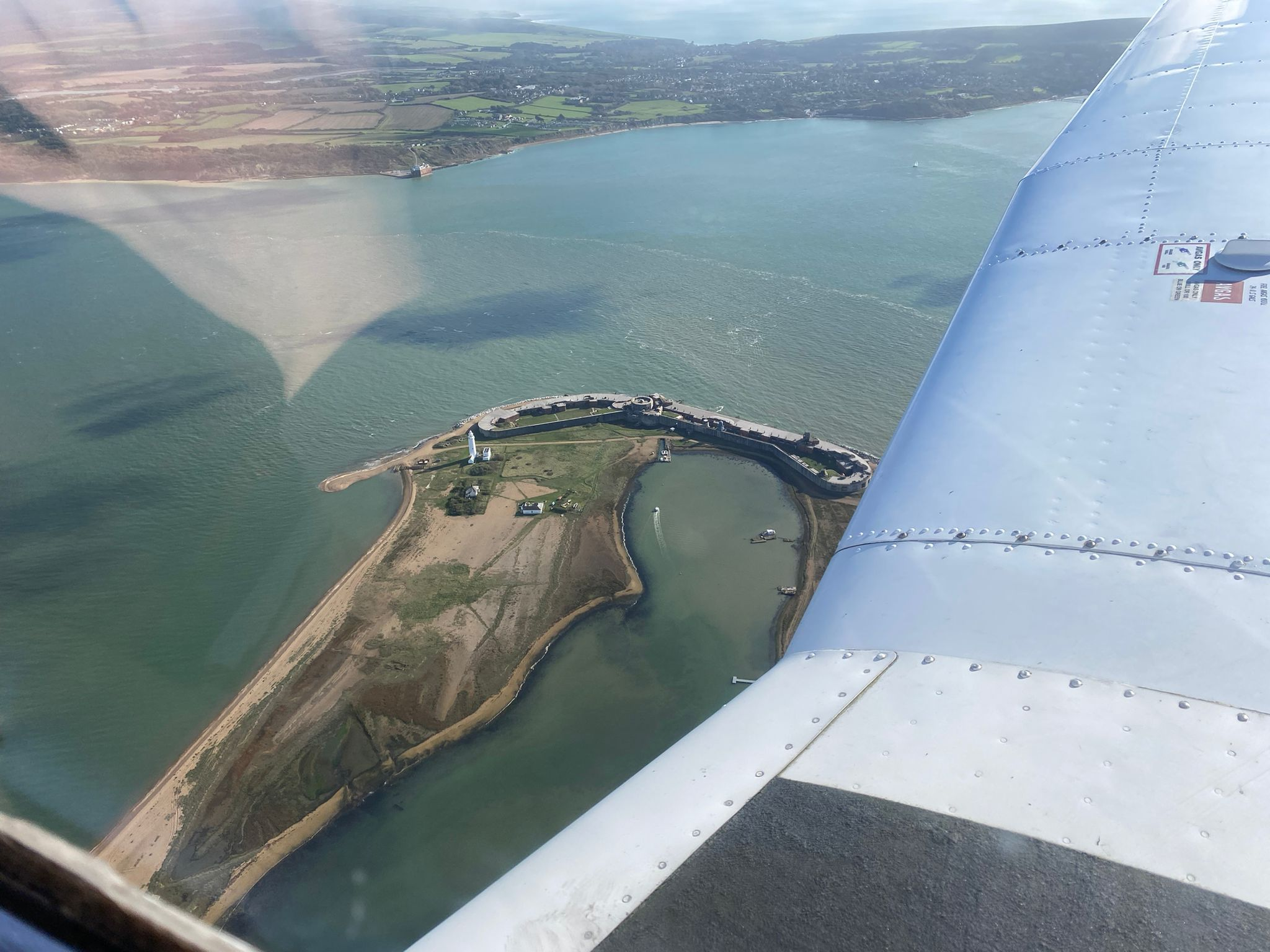
Hurst Point and the lighthouse from the air, taken from a small aircraft

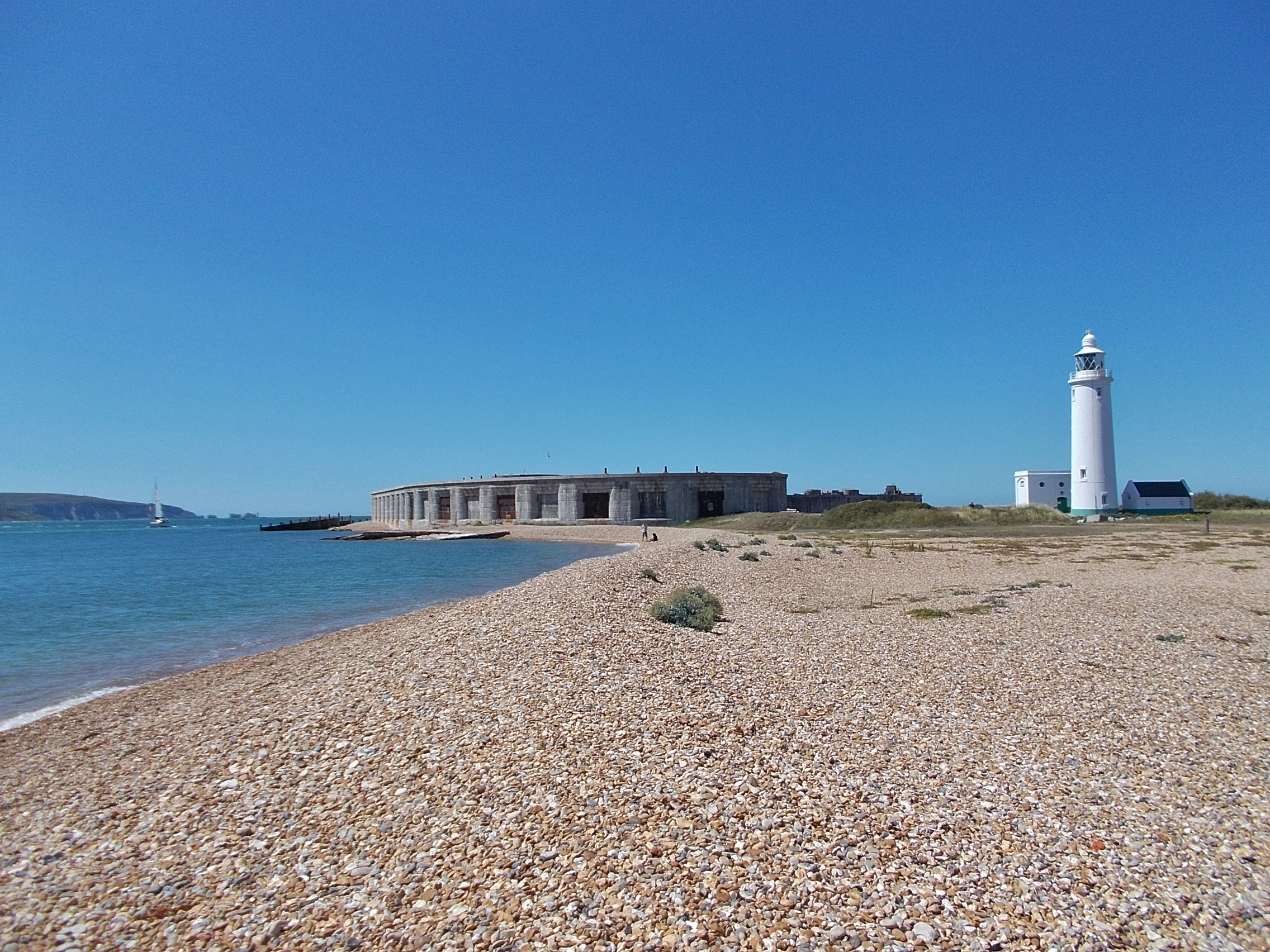
The Castle and Lighthouse from the north west. The Needles can be seen in the left distance.

The first lighthouse at Hurst was the Hurst Tower, sited to the south west of Hurst Castle, and lit for the first time on 29 September 1786. An additional and higher light - the High Lighthouse - was constructed in 1812.

These lighthouses were dismantled and replaced by two new lighthouses built in the 1860s. The first was the "Low Light" built into the rear wall of the west wing of the castle, which was superseded by the adjacent iron lighthouse in 1911. The second lighthouse was the "High Light" – the free standing Hurst Point Lighthouse built on the end of Hurst Spit between 1865 and 1867.

=== Other buildings ===
In the 18th century a small community of houses, including an inn, grew up just outside the castle, serving the needs of the soldiers, some of whom lodged in the houses with their families. The inn was called The Shipwright's Arms, and in 1808 it was said that "in the summer season, much company is attracted there, being on the beach of an open pure sea". The inn building was demolished with expansion of the castle in the mid 19th century, but by the 1870s there was a new inn, called the Castle Inn, which was "kept for the accommodation of the troops and the crews of the numerous stone-dredging vessels, which carry away great quantities of the shingle from the beach to Portsmouth, Southampton etc." The inn was still operating at the beginning of the 20th century. There was also a coastguard station "near the castle" in 1878 "with four men and a chief boatman", and there was a depot for "smacks employed in collecting from the adjacent coasts the septaria nodules, used in the manufacture of Roman cement."

A small dock, originally stone built, was constructed in the early 1850s, to aid the new building work. In the 1880s a military narrow gauge railway, part of the track of which survives, was built to shift stores and ammunition from the dock to the castle.
