= Hearst, California =

Unincorporated community in California, United States

Hearst
- Unincorporated community
- Location in California Hearst (the United States)
- Coordinates: 39°29′30″N 123°12′53″W
- Country: United States
- State: California
- County: Mendocino
- Elevation: 1,380 ft (420 m)

Hearst (formerly, Travelers Home) is an unincorporated community in Mendocino County, California, United States. It is located 13 miles (21 km) north-northwest of Potter Valley, at an elevation of 1,378 feet (420 m).

Hearst is a small farming unincorporated community near Willits. The area consists of large farming and ranch estates. There are also many landowners operating hospitality services on portions of their lands geared towards camping, hunting, fishing, trekking, and other outdoor activity. It is also known as Emandal or Emandal Resort after Hearst's largest cabin resort and farm. It is located at Latitude: 39.49333 : Longitude: -123.18083.

One mile west was the Kinsner Soda Spring, which formerly produced and sold drinking water.

At its peak, Hearst consisted of two hotels across the Eel River from each other, plus a schoolhouse and post office. A bridge over the river was built in 1890 to support the stagecoach line between Willits and Covelo.

A post office operated at Hearst from 1891 to 1953, having moved in 1898. The name honors Senator George Hearst.
