= Fort Victoria, Isle of Wight =

Victorian former military fort near Yarmouth, Isle of Wight in England

Fort Victoria
- Isle of Wight, England
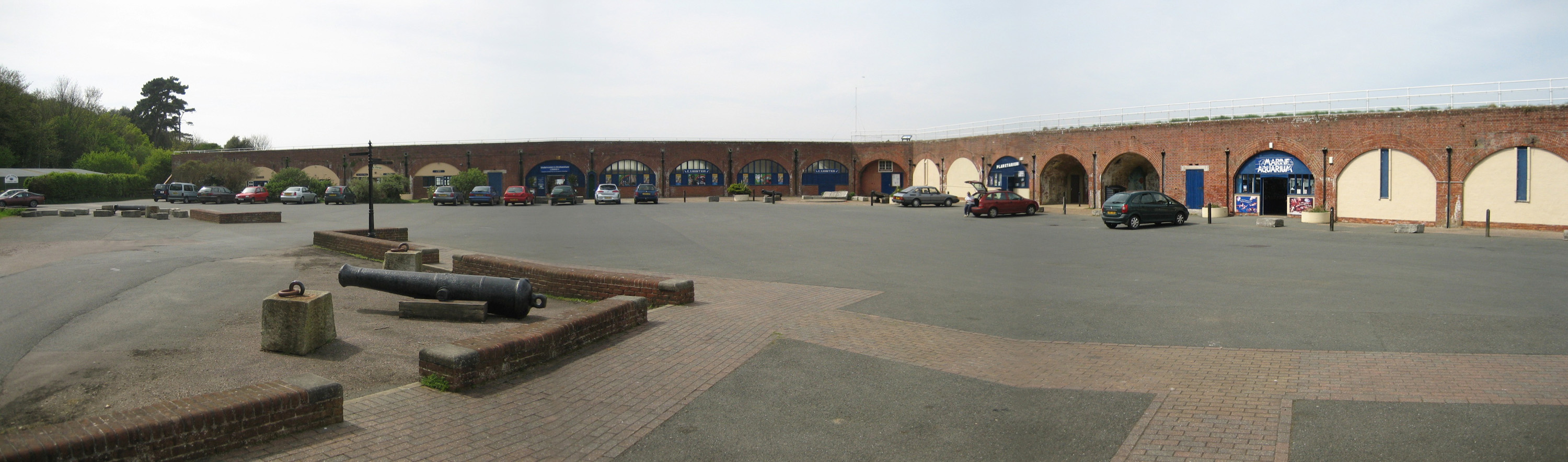
- Fort Victoria's casemates. The brickwork in the foreground shows the foundations of the former barracks.

Site information
- Type: Palmerston Fort
- Owner: Isle of Wight Council
- Open to the public: Yes

Listed Building – Grade II
- Official name: Fort Victoria
- Designated: 28 March 1994
- Reference no.: 1209376

Location
- Coordinates: 50°42′24″N 1°31′16″W

Site history
- Built: 1850s
- Materials: Brick, concrete

Fort Victoria is a former military fort on the Isle of Wight, England (grid reference SZ339898), built to guard the Solent. The earliest fort on the site was a coastal fort known as Sharpenode Bulwark built in 1545–1547 by Henry VIII, but these defences had fallen into disrepair by the 17th century. Fort Victoria was built in the 1850s. It was a brick-built triangular fort with two seaward batteries meeting at a right angle. It remained in use until 1962. Parts of the fort were subsequently demolished; areas of the fort that were preserved have become part of Fort Victoria Country Park.

== Location ==
Fort Victoria is situated on Sconce Point west of Yarmouth. Its position overlooks the whole of the Needles Passage and approaches to Yarmouth, and is almost opposite Hurst Castle on the mainland. Around 1 kilometre (0.62 miles) to the southwest lies Fort Albert.

== Earlier forts ==
The earliest fort on the site was Sharpenode Bulwark (also Sharpnode or Sharpnore) which was constructed in 1545–1547 as part of Henry VIII's coastal defences. It was about 700 metres east from an earlier fortification known as Worsley's Tower. Sharpenode Bulwark was a square earthwork with two angle bastions. It fell into disrepair and was repaired or even replaced in 1587 by George Carey, Captain of the Island. This became known as Carey's Sconce. The defences are said to have fallen into disrepair by 1623, and at the beginning of the 19th century only ruins remained.

== Fort Victoria ==
Fort Victoria was built in the 1850s. It is a brick-built triangular fort with concrete gun-floors. It has two seaward batteries meeting at a right angle. It became a functioning part of the new batteries on the heights above. At the same time a pier was built to serve the fort. It effectively became a military barracks and storehouse until rearmed with more modern armament in the 1880s. During the First and Second World Wars the fort saw service as a landing point and for storage. Between the wars it saw little use with the royal engineers leaving in 1920.

In the 1930s a proposal was made to run a car ferry between Fort Victoria and Keyhaven on the mainland. An act of Parliament was obtained, the Pier and Harbour Order (Keyhaven) Confirmation Act 1936 (26 Geo. 5 & 1 Edw. 8. c. lxxxi), but a lack of funds meant the proposal was abandoned in 1938.

At the start of World War II the fort was used as a training battery for coastal gunners and it was equipped with torpedo tubes mounted on the pier. After the war it was used as a National Service training station. Its military use came to an end in 1962.

What remains today is a fragment of the fort. The rear barracks blocks were demolished in 1969 to provide material for sea defences and Isle of Wight Council purchased what remained of the fort soon afterwards. The fort is now a Grade II Listed Building.

== Fort Victoria Country Park ==
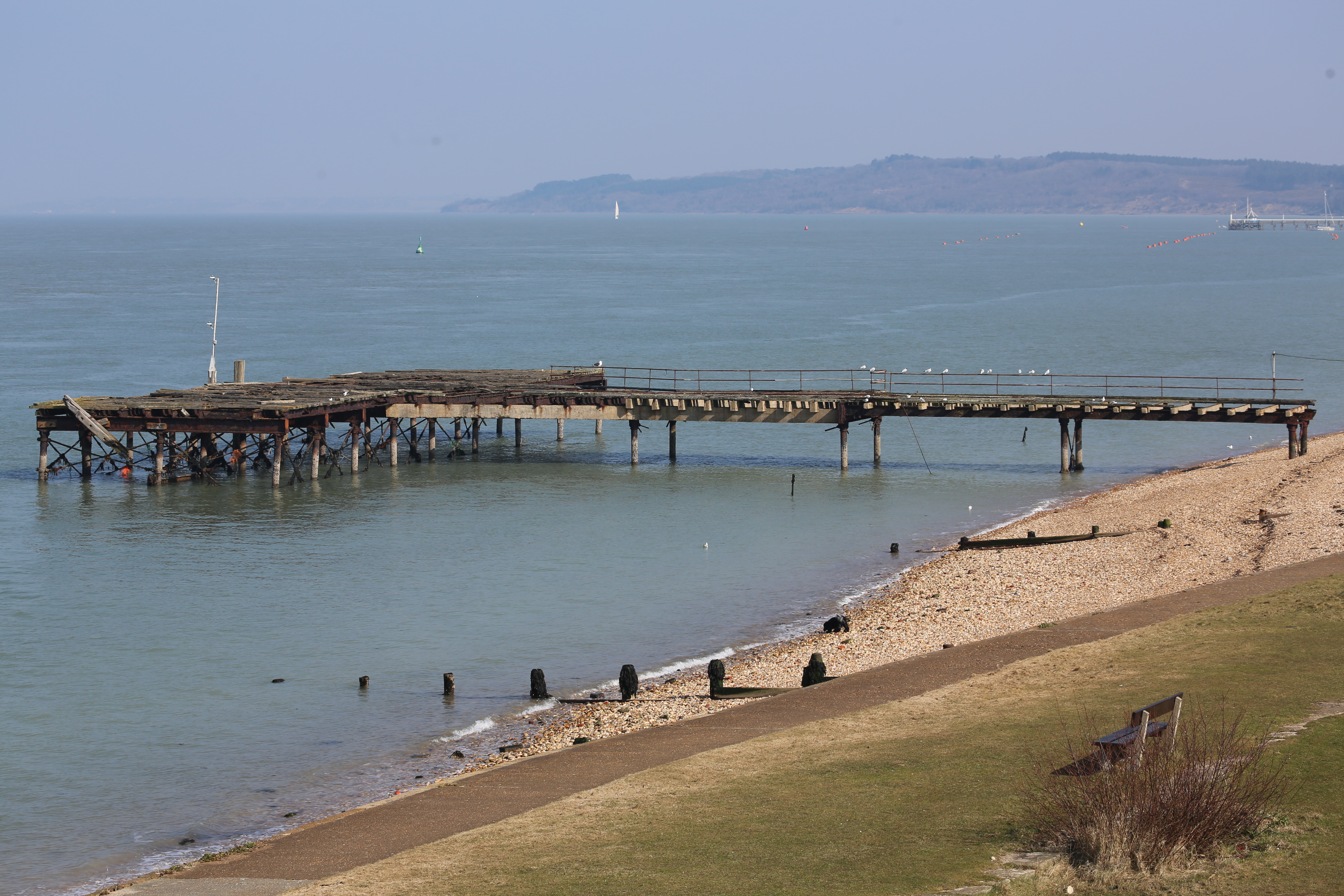
The remains of Fort Victoria Pier

Today the fort is part of Fort Victoria Country Park which occupies 20 hectares of woodland and shore on the northwest coast of the Isle of Wight. The fort houses a number of attractions including a Reptilarium, Visitor Centre and a model railway.

The derelict pier can still be seen.

== Publications ==
- Cantwell, Anthony (1986). The Needles Defences. Isle of Wight: Solent Papers. ISBN 1870113012.
