= Isle of Wight Rifles =

Princess Beatrice's Isle of Wight Rifles 8th Bn, Hampshire Regiment 530th Coast Regiment, Royal Artillery 428 Heavy AA Regiment, RA
- Active: 1860–Present
- Country: United Kingdom
- Branch: Volunteer Force/Territorial Army
- Role: Infantry (1860–1937; 1967–2006); Coast Artillery (1937–1949); Air Defence (1949–1967)
- Size: 1–3 Battalions
- Part of: Southern Command
- Garrison/HQ: Drill Hall Road Army Reserve Centre
- Nickname: 'The Green Gunners'
- Engagements: Suvla Bay; Gaza; Megiddo

The 1st Isle of Wight Rifle Volunteers, later the 8th (Isle of Wight, 'Princess Beatrice's Own') Battalion, Hampshire Regiment, but known informally as the 'Isle of Wight Rifles', was an auxiliary unit of the British Army formed to defend the Isle of Wight after a mid-19th Century invasion scare. During World War I it fought in the Gallipoli Campaign, taking part in the calamitous attack at Suvla Bay, and later at the battles of Gaza and Megiddo in Palestine. Between the wars it was converted to coast defence artillery and served in this role on the Isle of Wight throughout World War II. One battery was sent to reinforce the garrison of Tobruk, where it was captured in 1942. Postwar the unit converted to the air defence role, then reverted to infantry, and its successors continue in today's Army Reserve.

== Volunteer Force ==
The Isle of Wight had long been fortified against invasion, due to its strategic position. It had also had numerous troops billeted in the Napoleonic Wars. In 1859, artillery and infantry volunteer corps were raised in response to an invasion scare following the perceived resurgence of French naval power under Louis Napoleon III. On the Isle of Wight there was a major programme of fortification, including Forts Victoria, Albert, Golden Hill, and Culver and batteries at Sandown, Puckpool, Bouldnor and The Needles. Infantry support was provided by eight Rifle Volunteer Corps (RVCs) formed at various locations around the island (dates given are those of first officers' commissions):

- 1st (Ryde) Isle of Wight Rifle Volunteers – 25 January 1860, commanded by Captain Sir John Lees, 3rd Baronet, also a captain in the Hampshire Militia
- 2nd (Newport) Isle of Wight Rifle Volunteers – 27 August 1860, commanded by Capt Sir John Simeon, 3rd Baronet
- 3rd (2nd Ryde) Isle of Wight Rifle Volunteers – 7 December 1860, commanded by Capt John B.W. Fleming; absorbed into 1st RVC 1864
- 4th (Nunwell) Isle of Wight Rifle Volunteers – 17 July 1860, commanded by Lieutenant Sir Henry Oglander, 7th Baronet, promoted to captain in July 1860
- 5th (Ventnor) Isle of Wight Rifle Volunteers – 22 October 1860, commanded by Lt Albert J. Hambrough, promoted to captain in October 1860
- 6th (Sandown) Isle of Wight Rifle Volunteers – 31 March 1860, commanded by Capt Henry Farnell, with Sir George Lowther, formerly of the 69th Foot, as lieutenant; disbanded 1862
- 7th (Cowes and Osborne) Isle of Wight Rifle Volunteers – 27 April 1860, commanded by Capt William S. Graham formerly of the 2nd Bengal European Light Cavalry
- 8th (Freshwater) Isle of Wight Rifle Volunteers – 6 July 1860, commanded by Lt Benjamin T. Cotton; disbanded 1869

Those who served in the Corps paid for their own kit and expense; Newtown ranges were set aside for their training. They were soon 3,000 strong. With another 4,000 troops from the mainland, soldiers comprised 1 in 4 of the local population. By this time Queen Victoria had moved to the Isle of Wight at Osborne House.

The separate RVCs were brought under the umbrella of the 1st Administrative Battalion, Isle of Wight Rifle Volunteers, formed on 5 July 1860 with headquarters (HQ) at Newport, commanded by Lieutenant-Colonel Charles Dunsmore (formerly 42nd Highlanders) with Sir John Simeon promoted from the 2nd RVC as his Major. Francis Henry Atherley, formerly a major in the Rifle Brigade, was appointed as lt-col to command the Admin Bn on 30 June 1871.In 1880 the Admin Bn was consolidated as the 1st Isle of Wight Rifle Volunteers, organised as follows:

- A & B Companies at Ryde – formerly 1st RVC
- C & D Companies at Newport – formerly 2nd RVC
- E Company at Nunwell – formerly 4th RVC
- F & G Companies at Ventnor – formerly 5th RVC
- H Company at Cowes – formerly 7th RVC

Under the 'Localisation of the Forces' scheme introduced by the Cardwell Reforms of 1872, Volunteers were grouped into county brigades with their local Regular and Militia battalions – Sub-District No 40 (County of Hants) in Southern District for the Isle of Wight Rifles, grouped with the 37th and 67th Foot, the Hampshire Militia, and the three battalions of Hampshire RVCs.

The Childers Reforms of 1881 took Cardwell's reforms further, and the Volunteers were formally affiliated to their local Regular regiment, the 1st Isle of Wight becoming a volunteer battalion of the Hampshire Regiment formed from the 37th and 67th on 1 July 1881; on 18 August 1885 it was redesignated the 5th (Isle of Wight 'Princess Beatrice's') Volunteer Battalion of the Hampshire Regiment, Princess Beatrice being Queen Victoria's youngest daughter, married to Prince Henry of Battenberg, who was appointed Honorary Colonel of the battalion.

While the sub-districts were later referred to as 'brigades', they were purely administrative organisations and the Volunteers were excluded from the 'mobilisation' part of the Cardwell system. The Stanhope Memorandum of December 1888 proposed a more comprehensive Mobilisation Scheme for Volunteer units, which would assemble in their own brigades at key points in case of war. In peacetime these brigades provided a structure for collective training. Under this scheme the Volunteer Battalions of the Hampshire Regiment formed the Portsmouth Brigade (Hampshire Brigade from 1902).

=== Second Boer War ===
After Black Week in December 1899, the Volunteers were invited to send active service units to assist the Regulars in the Second Boer War. The War Office decided that one company 116 strong could be recruited from the volunteer battalions of any infantry regiment that had a regular battalion serving in South Africa. Only 20 IoW Riflemen were accepted as the '1st Active Service Section, Isle of Wight Rifles' of the Hampshire company. They served with the other Hampshire volunteers in a support capacity and distinguished themselves by marching 35 miles (56 km) in 12 hours to cover the withdrawal of a detachment under fire near Mafeking. For the second contingent in 1901, despite many volunteering, only 10 IoW Rifles were accepted and only three passed the medical. Even so, the unit was awarded the Battle Honour South Africa 1900-01.

== Territorial Force ==
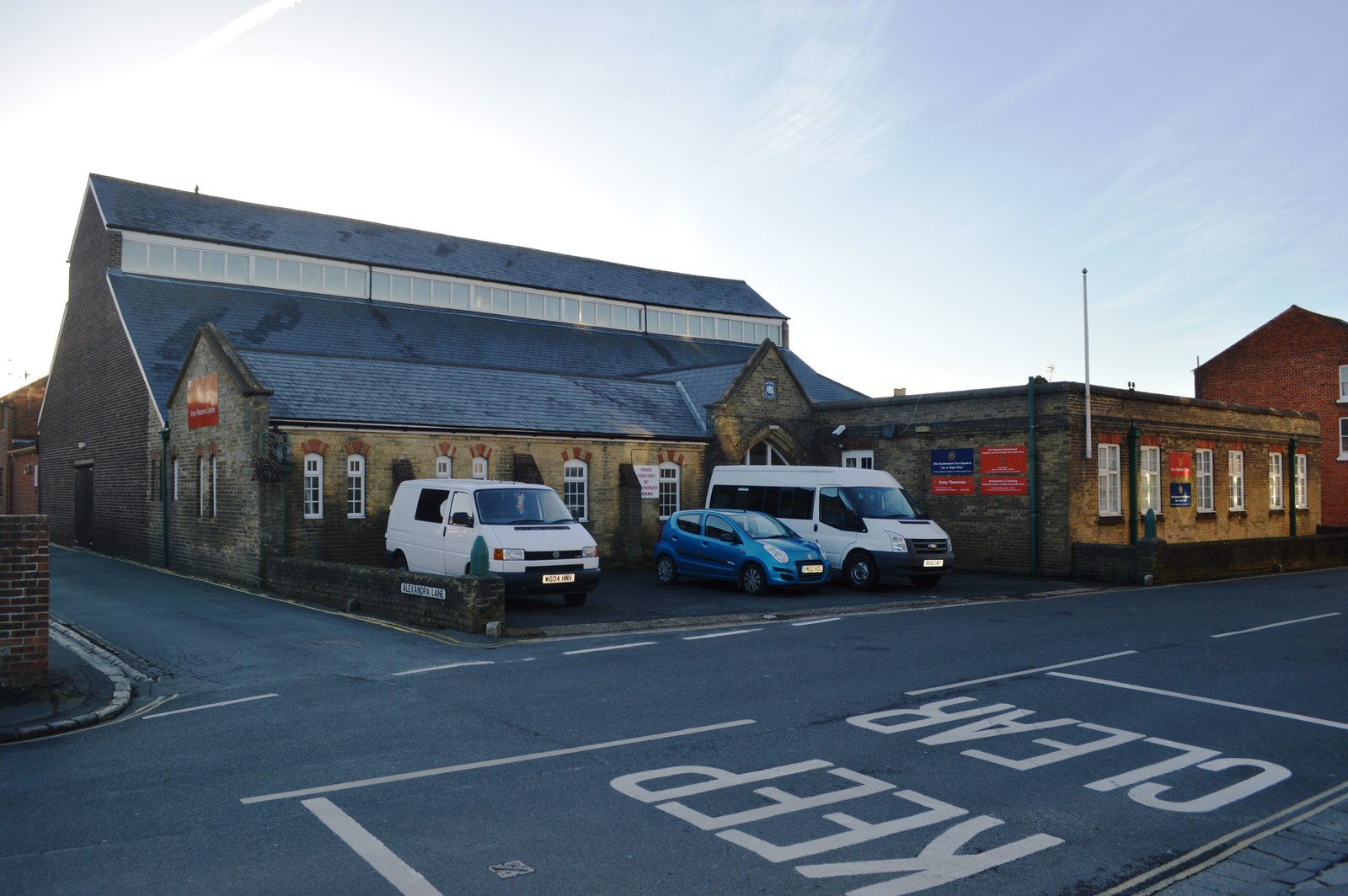
The Isle of Wight Rifles' drill hall in Drill Hall Road, Newport (now Drill Hall Road Army Reserve Centre).

When the Volunteers were subsumed into the new Territorial Force (TF) under the Haldane Reforms of 1908, the five volunteer battalions of the Hampshire Regiment were numbered in sequence following the Regulars and Special Reserve, so that the unit became the 8th Battalion. It was regranted its 'Isle of Wight Rifles, "Princess Beatrice's" ' subtitle in March 1909 and was distributed as follows:

- Battalion HQ at the Drill Hall, Drill Hall Road, Newport
- A Company at St James Street, Ryde, with detachments at Binstead Fishbourne and Havenstreet
- B Company at Upper Green Road, St Helens, detachments at Bembridge, Seaview and Brading
- C Company at Newport, detachments at Calbourne and Yarmouth
- D Company at Newport, detachments at Wootton and Locksgreen
- E Company at Broadway, Sandown, detachments at Shanklin and Wootton
- F Company at South Street, Ventnor, detachment at Wroxall
- G Company at Newport, detachments at Niton, Whitwell, Godshill, Chillerton and Brighstone
- H Company at Denmark Road, Cowes, detachment at Northwood

The Territorials were now paid an annual bounty of £5 and the weekend and annual two-week camps, for which wages were received, were very popular socially. On 23 May 1913 a retired officer, Lt-Col John Rhodes, took command. He offered a £1 bounty for joining and as a result a number of men from the mainland joined up in preference to other units.

While the four mainland TF battalions of the Hampshires constituted the Hampshire Brigade in the Wessex Division, the 8th remained unattached under the orders of Southern Command, allocated to 'Southern and South Western Coast Defences'.

== World War I ==
=== Mobilisation ===
When war broke out in August 1914, the Rifles were mobilised to man local fortifications under the command of Lt-Col Rhodes. Shortly afterwards TF units were invited to volunteer for Overseas Service, and the War Office issued instructions to separate those men who had signed up for Home Service only, and form these into reserve units. The titles of these 2nd Line units would be the same as the original, but distinguished by a '2/' prefix. Later, many 2nd line battalions were prepared for overseas service and 3rd line units were formed to supply reinforcement drafts to the 1st and 2nd.

=== 1/8th Battalion ===
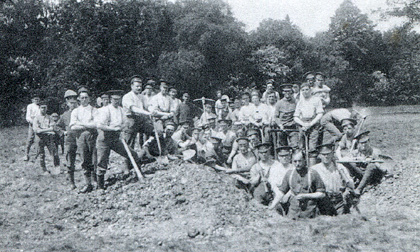
Men of the Isle of Wight Rifles in training at Watford, 1915.

Whereas the Wessex Division sailed to relieve Regular troops in India, the 1/8th Battalion was left training at Parkhurst. However, on 19 April 1915 it was assigned to 163rd (Norfolk and Suffolk) Brigade in 54th (East Anglian) Division to replace the 1/4th Battalion, Suffolk Regiment, which had already gone overseas. The 54th (EA) Division had been employed on coast defence, but now it was preparing to go overseas, completing its training at Bury St Edmunds and Watford. On 30 July 1915 the Isle of Wight Rifles sailed from Liverpool aboard the RMS Aquitania (some wood of which now forms a bar in Sandown Broadway), to join the fighting at Gallipoli.

==== Suvla Bay ====
In an effort to re-invigorate the stalled Gallipoli campaign an Allied force under Lieutenant-General Hon Sir Frederick Stopford had landed at Suvla Bay on 7–8 August 1915. The beach led to a plain overlooked by a range of hills. Stopford (who set up his command post in a sloop – HMS Jonquil – anchored offshore) took the beaches but waited whilst stores were landed before occupying the empty hills. By the time he decided to move upon them the Turks had filled them full of artillery and infantry. 163rd Brigade, consisting of the 1/5th Suffolks, 1/4th & 1/5th Norfolk Regiment, and 1/8th Hampshires (IoW Rifles), was landed on 10 August 1915 in order to attack the Turkish positions on Anafurta Ridge. Stopford delayed the attack, wishing to make good losses in his lines, until pressured by the overall commander, General Sir Ian Hamilton, to order the attack. This delay gave the Turks full warning of the impending attack.

On 12 August 1915 163rd Bde was ordered to advance 2 miles (3.2 km) across terrain varying from thick scrub to abandoned fields, all cut with dried watercourses. The purpose of the movement was to clear the area of snipers prior to a divisional attack on Anafarta Ridge the next day. Muddle and confusion hampered the planning with the individual battalions not receiving the warning order that the advance was to take place, while no clear objective was indicated. Eventually at 16.45 the 'Advance' was sounded. 1/8th Hampshires advanced in the centre of the brigade with 1/5th Norfolks on the right. The start line that had been doglegged around a small hill was then subject to a muddled order that changed the direction of the 1/5th Norfolks at the moment of advance. Rather than straightening the line, the bend was amplified and as the Norfolks charged a gap opened up between them and the 1/8th Hants and the rest of 163rd Bde. Crossing the open ground the battalions began to take heavy casualties and lost cohesion. Advancing 1,500 yards (1,400 m) across the more favourable terrain, the Norfolks took nearly 40 per cent casualties. The remainder of the battalion, including a company recruited from the Royal Estate at Sandringham, together with a party of 1/8th Hants, were able to advance the furthest into the forest. However, they were cut off and never heard of again. Mystery and fantasy has dogged this action ever since: some 122 bodies were discovered in 1919. The Official History described 163rd Bde's attack as a 'calamity'. The Isle of Wight Rifles reported 8 officers and 150 other ranks (ORs) killed or missing, including three brothers from the Urry family together with their brother-in-law all killed, whilst among the officers two brothers, Captains Clayton and Donald Ratsey of the legendary sailmaking firm Ratsey & Lapthorn, were killed. The battalion also suffered 1 officer and 140 ORs wounded. Some of the missing and wounded found their way back to the British lines after dark, others had been evacuated to hospitals in Egypt. Once the remaining missing men were reclassified as 'presumed killed in action', the Rifles had lost a total of 89 men killed in action. The commanding officer, Lt-Col J.E. Rhodes, had also been evacuated with sunstroke. At the end of the action the brigade held a temporary line formed along a road edge for 48 hours until relieved by the 161st (Essex) Bde.

On 16 August the battalion was sent to take over the support trenches of 10th (Irish) Division, noting that the positions 'certainly could not be called reserve or support trenches as there were no trenches in front of us'. Here the battalion suffered badly from Turkish snipers. It was relieved on 26 August and went into reserve. In September the Rifles were sent south to Anzac Cove and did spells of duty in the front line trenches at 'South Wales Borderers Gully', 'Hill 60', and 'Cheshire Ridge', suffering a steady toll of casualties. In October the 1/1st Eastern Mounted Brigade arrived from the UK (without their horses) to reinforce the weak 54th (EA) Division, and a party of 1/1st Norfolk Yeomanry was attached to 1/8th Hants for instruction in Trench warfare. By late November the decision had been made to evacuate the Suvla–Anzac front and 54th (EA) Division was the first to go. The battalion embarked at Williams Pier, Anzac Cove, on 3 December and was transported first to Mudros, and then to Alexandria in Egypt, arriving on 19 December.

==== Egypt and Palestine ====
The whole division was in a very weak state and needed reinforcements and recuperation. 1/8th Battalion moved to an acclimatisation camp at Sidi Bish, then to Mena Camp by the Pyramids of Giza. 54th (EA) Division then took over No 1 (Southern) Section of the Suez Canal defences on 2 April 1916, with the 1/8th Hants stationed at the Bitter Lakes. It became simply the 8th Hampshires when the 2/8th ad 3/8th Bns disappeared during 1916 (see below).

The situation remained unchanged until December 1916, when the Egyptian Expeditionary Force (EEF) began its advance across the Sinai Desert to launch the Sinai and Palestine Campaign. In January 1917 the 8th Hants marched 145 miles (233 km) in 12 days across the Sinai Desert from Mazar to the EEF's new forward base at el Arish from which it would advance into Palestine. At the First Battle of Gaza on 26 March, 54th (EA) Division covered the inland flank of Eastern Force. 163rd Brigade was in reserve and did not participate in the action; it covered the retirement of the rest of the division after the attack on Gaza had failed.

On the night of 17 April 1917 the offensive against the Turkish line was renewed, supported by tanks (the Second Battle of Gaza). The first phase of the Rifles' operation to capture the Sheik Abbas ridge went well, but one of the tanks, a Mark I male, "Sir Archibald", was destroyed by artillery. On the morning of the 19th the attack against the Sihan Redoubt commenced with the Rifles in support of the 1/4th & 1/5th Norfolks. As the two leading battalions melted away the Rifles found themselves leading the attack. Eventually the redoubt was captured following a last charge by the other supporting tank, a Mark I female, "Nutty". Sihan or Tank redoubt was briefly held by a handful of Norfolks, Rifles and Australians, until they were forced to retire through lack of ammunition and water. The Rifles sustained major casualties during the day's attack. Two hundred were kept in reserve but out of 800 who went into action only two officers and 90 ORs answered roll call the following evening, some being taken prisoner and subsequently transferred to Austria.

There was another pause while the EEF reorganised to continue its advance. In the meantime the 54th (EA) Division kept up a series of trench raids against Turkish positions. One raid by 8th Hampshire against 'Beach Post' was regarded as a model of its kind, and earned the battalion high praise, as they captured a machine gun and two Lewis guns, as well as demolishing several dug-outs. The attack had been carried out at the point of the bayonet, one sergeant accounting for 13 Turks alone. General Edmund Allenby took overall command of the Palestine Campaign in August 1917.

Allenby began his final successful assault against the Gaza–Beersheba Line on 27 October 1917 with the Third Battle of Gaza. 54th (EA) Division launched its attack on the Turkish trenches to the south of Gaza on 2 November. The battalions of 163rd Bde lost direction, with 8th Hampshires splitting in two, one body swinging right-handed into 'Triangle Trench' outside its defined objectives, the other capturing 'Burj Trench'. Carrying out its task cost the Rifles 2 officers and 51 ORs killed, but the partial success fulfilled Allenby's aim, and 54th (EA) Division entered the deserted city of Gaza on 7 November. The EEF then pursued the Turks into the Judean Hills.

The Turks launched a counter-attack on 27 November in an effort to defend Jerusalem, and the strung-out 54th (EA) Division was attacked at Wilhelma. However, the EEF continued its operations and Allenby entered Jerusalem on 11 December. The Turks launched a vigorous counter-attack to retake the city, while Allenby tried to push them back to protect the flanks of Jerusalem, launching the Battle of Jaffa. While 2/4th and 2/5th Hampshires in 75th Division attacked, 54th (EA) Division extended its lines to improve the EEF's positions. In March 1918 the EEF advanced into the Jordan Valley. Parts of 54th (EA) Division took part in the Battle of Tell'Asur on 12 March and in the failed attempt to extend the line at Berukin on 9–10 April.

Allenby launched his final offensive (the Battle of Megiddo) in September 1918. 54th (EA) Division (now the EEF's only all-British infantry division) was part of XXI Corps' attack on the left across the Plain of Sharon, with the 54th acting as the pivot for the whole attack. When the assault went in on 19 September there was no preliminary bombardment: the artillery opening fire at 04.30 was the signal for the infantry to advance behind a Creeping barrage in what became known as the Battle of Sharon. The first phase was for 163rd Bde, with 8th Hampshire on the left and 5th Suffolk on the right, to move out at 04.20, then attack the high ground south east of Kufr Qasim. This phase was carried out with little difficulty, the 163rd Bde then pausing to let the rest of the division catch up. Next day the division continued its advance, and by the end of the day XXI Corps had, in the words of the Official History, 'completed one of the most overwhelmingly successful operations of the war'.

The EEF now began a relentless pursuit of the broken Turkish army into Syria, but supply difficulties meant that several infantry formations got left behind, including 54th (EA) Division, which marched more slowly up the coast and reached Haifa on 4 October. It then provided working parties to improve the communications before resuming its march towards Beirut by brigade groups on 23 October. It began concentrating at Beirut on 31 October, but on that day the Armistice of Mudros came into force and the war against the Turks ended.

The division was ordered back to Egypt by sea on 24 November, and 163rd Bde began embarking on 28 November. The division concentrated at Helmie in December, and demobilisation began in January 1919, the TF units being progressively reduced to cadre strength; the 8th Hants was reduced to cadre . When rioting broke out in Egypt in March 1919, the remainder of the 8th Hants joined the Army of Occupation in the Sudan. It was finally reduced to cadre in Egypt on 4 February 1920 returned to the Isle of Wight, where it was disembodied on 14 May 1920.

=== 2/8th and 3/8th Battalions ===
The Isle of Wight Rifles formed its 2nd line battalion at Newport on 16 September 1914 and its 3rd Line in May 1915. However, the 2nd Wessex Division had followed the 1st to India and there was no place for the 2/8th Hampshires: the battalion was disbanded at Newport on 10 April when the 3/8th Bn was redesignated 2/8th. It continued at Bournemouth supplying reinforcement drafts to the 1/8th in Egypt until 1 September 1916 when it was absorbed into the 4th Reserve Bn (previously the 3/4th Hampshires) in the Wessex Reserve Bde at Romsey.

==== Mesopotamia ====
In September 1916 a draft of 250 Rifles from 4th Reserve Bn was shipped to India. From here they were landed at Basra with the Indian Army. They fought no major battles but were involved in constant skirmishing through Amarah, Kut, Ctesiphon, Persia, Turkestan, Constantinople, Salonika, Italy and France, returning home in 1919.

== Interwar ==
The Rifles were stood down in 1920, but were not disbanded due to intervention by Princess Beatrice (Governess of the IoW). The TF had reformed on 7 February 1920 and reorganised as the Territorial Army (TA) in 1921. The IoW Rifles were mobilised at Albany Barracks during a coal strike in 1921. In 1923 the battalion rejoined the Hampshire Brigade, now the 128th (Hampshire) Infantry Brigade of 43rd (Wessex) Division, alongside the 4th, 5th/7th and 6th Bns of the Hampshires.

=== Princess Beatrice's (Isle of Wight Rifles) Heavy Regiment, RA ===
In 1926 it was decided that the coastal defence guns of Great Britain should be solely manned by part-time soldiers of the TA. This involved some reorganisation of existing units and the creation of some new units. On 9 September 1937 the battalion transferred to the Royal Artillery (RA) as The Princess Beatrice's (Isle of Wight) Rifles Heavy Brigade ('Regiment' from 1 November 1938) in the Portsmouth and Isle of Wight defences with the following organisation:

- HQ at the Drill Hall, Drill Hall Road, Newport
- 189 Hvy Bty at Drill Hall, Denmark Road, Cowes
- 190 Hvy Bty at Drill Hall, St John's Wood Road, Ryde

== World War II ==
=== Mobilisation ===
On the outbreak of war the regiment and its two batteries mobilised in the Portsmouth Defences. The guns were controlled by four Fire Commands (FCs) at the Needles, Culver, Horse Sand Fort and Square Tower (Portsmouth).

=== 530th Princess Beatrice's (Isle of Wight Rifles) Coast Regiment, RA ===
With the danger of invasion after the British Expeditionary Force was evacuated from Dunkirk, the coastal artillery regiments underwent a major reorganisation in the summer of 1940. On 5 September the regiment was redesignated 530th The Princess Beatrice's (Isle of Wight Rifles) Coast Regiment and reorganised as four batteries, designated A to D:

- A Battery at Cliff End Battery
- B Battery
- C Battery at Fort Albert
- D Battery at Hurst Castle

Although the regiment was employed manning the extensive coastal defences many personnel were drafted to service in other units. A contingent sailed to Gibraltar aboard the SS Aquila to prepare defences against Franco's Spain. Another served with General Alexander in Burma.

=== 202 Coast Battery ===
At the end of February 1941 B/530 Coast Bty was withdrawn from the regiment to join the War Office Reserve preparatory to going overseas. It was designated a 'Day and Night Battery'. It sailed for Alexandria on the RMS Empress of Canada in the summer of 1941 and was shipped into the besieged port of Tobruk aboard HMAS Voyager (part of the Tobruk Ferry Service). Here the garrison's coast defences (captured Italian guns previously manned by the Sherwood Rangers Yeomanry) were formed into 17th Coast Rgt on 12 September. In practice, the port experienced air rather than naval attacks through the eight-month Siege of Tobruk.

In November 1941, Eighth Army began a new offensive in the Western Desert (Operation Crusader), which succeeded in ending the siege. 17th Coast Rgt remained in position as the port became an important supply point for Eighth Army. The first phase of 'Crusader' lasted until January 1942, when General Erwin Rommel counter-attacked and Eighth Army fell back to dug in along the Gazala Line. There was then a lull in the fighting until May, while both sides reorganised.

The Battle of Gazala began on 26 May, and Rommel's Axis forces quickly broke into the British position. After bitter fighting, Eighth Army was forced to retreat. The British hoped to defend Tobruk as in the previous siege, but the Axis forces reached it before the defences were ready. Rommel's attack on Tobruk began on 20 June. After the preliminary air bombardment, Axis tanks made rapid progress through the perimeter defences. Tobruk surrendered the following day, and around 33,000 Allied troops were captured, including 17th Coast Rgt with 202 Coast Bty. 202 Coast Bty was officially disbanded on 11 November 1942,.

=== Home Defence ===
After B Bty left, the regiment was temporarily joined on 31 December 1940 by 417 Coast Bty, which transferred to a newly formed 539th Coast Rgt on 28 January. 210 Coast Bty at Bouldnor Battery was incorporated into the regiment from Needles FC on 8 March. On 1 April 1941, A and D Btys were numbered 126 and 129, while C Bty was reorganised as 127 and 128 Btys and part of Regimental HQ (RHQ). This gave the regiment the following organisation:

- RHQ
- 126 Coast Bty at Needles Battery
- 127 Coast Bty at Cliff End
- 128 Coast Bty at Fort Albert
- 129 Coast Bty at Hurst Castle
- 172 Independent Coast Bty – joined 16 July 1941
- 210 Coast Bty at Bouldnor
- 17 Coast Observer Detachment (COD) – left by July 1943
- 28 COD – joined by December 1942, left by July 1943

In April 1942 the regiment came under the command of V Corps Coast Artillery HQ, changing to Hampshire & Dorset District by October when V Corps embarked for North Africa (Operation Torch).

=== Late war ===
By 1942 the threat from German attack had diminished and there was demand for trained gunners for the fighting fronts. A process of reducing the manpower in the coast defences began. The manpower requirements for the forthcoming Allied invasion of Normandy (Operation Overlord) led to further reductions in coast defences in April 1944. By this stage of the war many of the coast battery positions were manned by Home Guard detachments or in the hands of care and maintenance parties. However, the importance of the Solent–Portsmouth–Southampton defences was such that few major changes affected 530th Coast Rgt; 172 Coast Bty transferred to 554th Coast Rgt on 1 April but 33 COD joined from 532nd (Pembroke) Coast Rgt in July.

The war in Europe ended in May 1945 and on 1 June 126 Bty (an established TA battery) passed into suspended animation and the war-formed 210 Bty was disbanded, the process being completed by 22 June. The rest of the regiment began entering suspended animation on 19 October 1945, with RHQ at Totland, and 127, 128 and 129 Btys at Cliff End, Fort Albert and Hurst Castle respectively. They completed the process by 16 November.

== Postwar ==
When the TA was reconstituted on 1 January 1947, the regiment reformed as 428 The Princess Beatrice's (Isle of Wight Rifles) Coast Regiment, RA, forming part of 102 Coast Brigade.

However, it was soon afterwards decided to reduce the number of TA coast regiments, and on 1 September 1948 the regiment was converted to 428 The Princess Beatrice's (Isle of Wight Rifles) Heavy Anti-Aircraft Regiment, RA, with three batteries based at Ryde, Newport and Cowes with RHQ at Newport. The batteries were armed with 3.7-inch HAA guns and associated radars and predictors. The regiment became 'Mixed' on 1 January 1949, the term indicating that members of the Women's Royal Army Corps were integrated into the unit. They were briefly responsible for manning 5.25-inch gunsites on the Island.

After the demise of Anti-Aircraft Command and the reduction in air defence units in 1955, the Rifles were reduced, becoming P (Princess Beatrice's IoW Rifles) Battery equipped with mobile 3.7-inch guns in 457 (Wessex) HAA Rgt (redesignated 457 (Wessex) HAA Rgt (Hampshire Carabiners Yeomanry) in 1963). When the regiment re-equipped with Thunderbird surface-to-air missiles the battery became P (IoW Rifles) HQ Bty. The main element of the battery was the Regimental Surveillance Troop with 4 x Mk 7 & height finding radars.

In 1967 The TA was reduced into the Territorial and Army Volunteer Reserve (TAVR) and 457 Rgt was disbanded and reconstituted as C (Wessex Royal Artillery, Princess Beatrice's) Company, Hampshire and Isle of Wight Territorials in TAVR III before being reduced to a cadre in 1969. In 1971 the cadre was reconstituted as 6 Platoon, B Company (Hampshire), 1st Battalion, Wessex Regiment (The Rifle Volunteers) in TAVR II - a mobilisation component of 1 (Guards) Infantry Brigade (the Guards title being dropped during the 1970s). In 1986 the company (including 6 platoon) was moved to the 2nd Battalion and the mobilisation role was changed to home defence in 43 (Wessex) Infantry Brigade.

== Modern day ==
Following the Dissolution of the Soviet Union, the Options for Change white paper was published in which the Queen's Regiment was amalgamated with the Royal Hampshire Regiment to create the Princess of Wales's Royal Regiment (Queen's and Royal Hampshire's). A and B companies of 2 Wessex were amalgamated as C (Duke of Connaught's) Company, 6th/7th Battalion PWRR, and the Isle of Wight Rifles became 9 (Princess Beatrice's Isle of Wight Rifles) Platoon, awkwardly placing C company in 145 (Home Counties) Brigade district (re-designated 145 (South) Brigade in 1994) whilst the remainder of the battalion (and the sister 5th Battalion) were in 2 (South East) Brigade district. The 1998 Strategic Defence Review reorganised the TA infantry along brigade lines, and the Isle of Wight Rifles became 9 (Princess Beatrice) Platoon, D Company of a new battalion, 3rd PWRR (The Royal Rifle Volunteers) formed by all the TA infantry in 145 Brigade in 1999. Despite the Royal Rifle Volunteer designation the unit continued to be badged to the Princess of Wales's Royal Regiment.

Under the Strategic Defence Review New Chapter 17 Port and Maritime Regiment, Royal Logistic Corps agreed to take the Island's Territorial unit into their TA counterpart, 165 Port and Maritime Regiment, to maintain the TA Centre with the designation 266 (Southampton) Port Sqn. "Isle of Wight Rifles", 165 Port & Maritime Regt., Royal Logistics Corps.

== Uniforms and insignia ==
The uniform of the Isle of Wight Rifles was Rifle green with the same colour facings, later changed to black facings similar to the Rifle Brigade. It retained this uniform even after it had become a battalion of the red-coated Hampshire Regiment. Upon conversion to artillery the regiment was permitted to retain the Isle of Wight Rifles' cap badge and the traditional black buttons of a rifle regiment. In addition the officers continued to wear the green and black patrol jacket and trousers, earning them the nickname 'The Green Gunners'. From 1947 to 1955 all ranks continued to wear the Isle of Wight Rifles' cap badge together with a rifle green lanyard. Apart from the officers, this ceased upon merger with 457 HAA Rgt, but all ranks of P Bty adopted a special embroidered version of the cap badge as an arm badge.

== Honorary Colonels ==
The following served as Honorary Colonel of the regiment:

- Prince Henry of Battenberg appointed September 1885
- The Duke of York appointed 1896; later Colonel-in-Chief as King George V
- Princess Beatrice appointed 1937
- Earl Mountbatten of Burma appointed 1950 (nephew of Prince Henry and great-nephew of Princess Beatrice)

== Awards ==
The Rifles received two Distinguished Service Orders, a Distinguished Conduct Medal, four Military Crosses, seven Military Medals and various mentions in despatches during their war service.
