= Cliff End =

Cliff End may refer to:

- Cliff End Battery
- Cliff End Fort
- Cliff End House
- Cliff End Hotel
