= Hurst Castle =

Device Fort in Hampshire, England

- Hurst Point, Milford on Sea, Hampshire, England
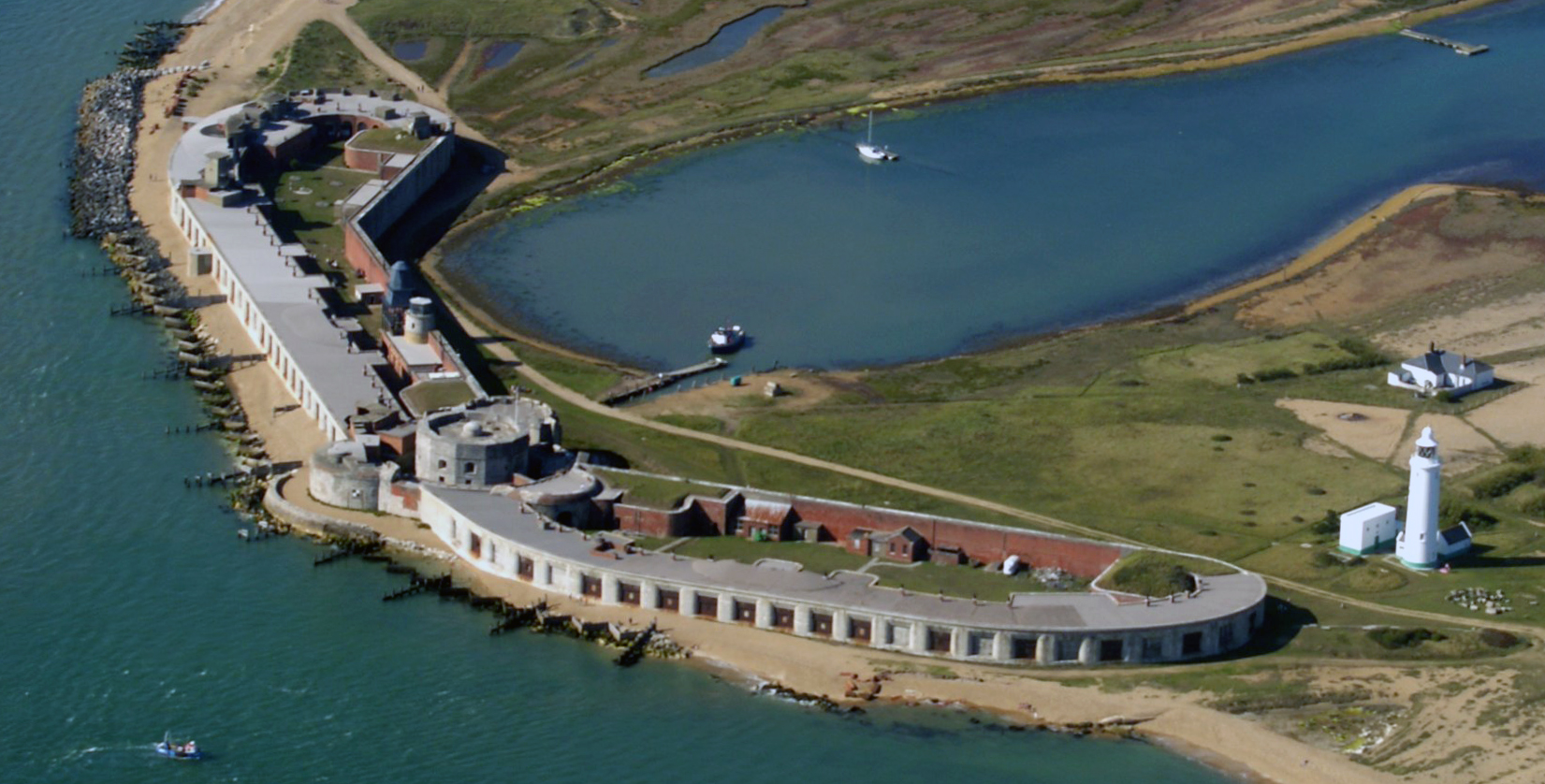
- The castle seen from the south-east in 2011

Site information
- Type: Device Fort
- Owner: English Heritage
- Open to the public: Yes

Scheduled monument
- Official name: Hurst Castle and lighthouse
- Designated: 9 October 1981
- Reference no.: 1015699
- Condition: Intact

Location
- Shown within Hampshire
- Coordinates: 50°42′23″N 1°33′04″W

Site history
- Built: 1541–44; 1861–74
- In use: 1544-1945
- Materials: Stone, Brick

Hurst Castle is an artillery fort established by Henry VIII on the Hurst Spit in Hampshire, England, between 1541 and 1544. It formed part of the king's Device Forts coastal protection programme against invasion from France and the Holy Roman Empire, and defended the western entrance to the Solent waterway. The early castle had a central keep and three bastions, and in 1547 was equipped with 26 guns. It was expensive to operate due to its size, but it formed one of the most powerful forts along the coast. During the English Civil War of the 1640s, Hurst was held by Parliament and was used briefly to detain King Charles I before his execution in 1649. It continued in use during the 18th century but fell into disrepair, the spit being frequented by smugglers.

Repairs were made during the French Revolutionary Wars and the Napoleonic Wars with France, and the castle was modernised to enable it to hold 24-pounder (10.8 kg) guns. Fresh fears of invasion followed in the 1850s, leading to heavier, 32-pounder (14.5 kg) armament being installed and new gun batteries being laid out on both sides of the castle. Technological developments rapidly made these defences obsolete, however, and a fresh phase of work between 1861 and 1874 created sixty-one gun positions in two long, granite-faced batteries alongside the older castle. These held very heavy weapons, including massive 12.5 inch, 38 ton (317 mm, 39,000 kg) rifled muzzle-loading guns. As the century progressed these too became outdated, and lighter, quick-firing guns were installed at the castle to replace them.

The castle formed part of a network of defences around the entrance to the Solent during the First World War, and was re-armed again during the Second World War. The military decommissioned the fort in 1956 and it passed into the control of the Ministry of Works. In the 21st century, it is run jointly by English Heritage and the Friends of Hurst Castle as a tourist attraction, receiving around 40,000 visitors during 2015. Coastal erosion has become a growing problem despite government intervention in protecting the spit. Four lighthouses have been built at Hurst from the 18th century onwards, one of which, a high lighthouse first opened in 1867, remains in active service.

In January 2021, local media reported that the castle was in urgent need of repairs due to coastal erosion, and the wall of the eastern wing partially collapsed on 26 February 2021 as the sea cut into and compromised its foundations. The World Monuments Fund included the castle on their 2022 World Monuments Watch list of most endangered sites.

In September 2022, it was one of six English castles included in a fundraising campaign by English Heritage to mitigate risks of destruction due to worsening coastal erosion. They hope to gather enough funds to repair and strengthen the sea walls around the castle.

== History ==
=== 16th century ===
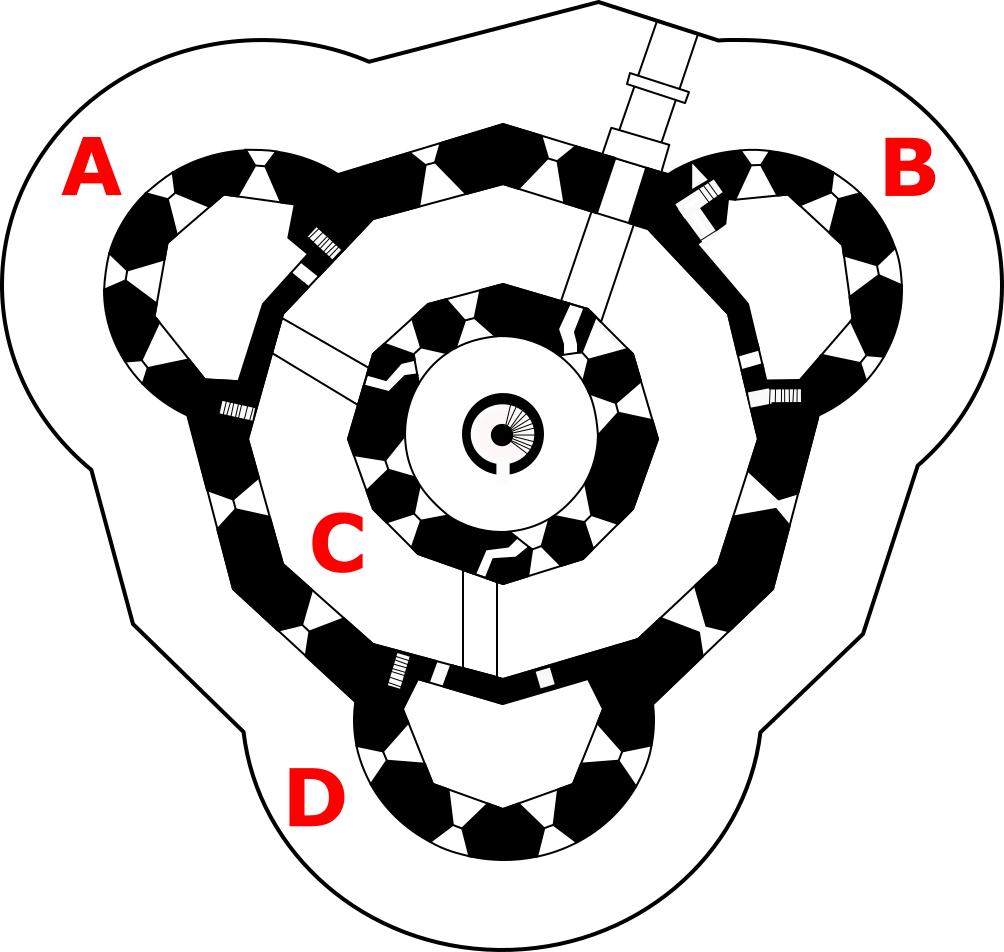
Plan of the 16th-century castle. Key: A – north-west bastion; B – north-east bastion; C – keep; D – south bastion

Hurst Castle was built as a consequence of international tensions between England, France and the Holy Roman Empire in the final years of the reign of King Henry VIII. Traditionally the Crown had left coastal defences to local lords and communities, only taking a modest role in building and maintaining fortifications, and while France and the Empire remained in conflict, maritime raids were common but an actual invasion of England seemed unlikely. Modest defences based around simple blockhouses and towers existed in the south-west and along the Sussex coast, with a few more impressive works in the north of England, but in general the fortifications were limited in scale. Worsley's Tower, for example, built opposite the future site of Hurst Castle in the 1520s, was too small to hold powerful artillery and considered by surveyors in 1539 to be "one of the worst devised things" they had seen.

In 1533, Henry broke with Pope Clement VII over the annulment of his long-standing marriage to Catherine of Aragon. Catherine was the aunt of Charles V, the Holy Roman Emperor, who took the annulment as a personal insult. This resulted in France and the Empire declaring an alliance against Henry in 1538, and the Pope encouraging the two countries to attack England. An invasion of England appeared certain. In response, Henry issued an order, called a "device", in 1539, giving instructions for the "defence of the realm in time of invasion" and the construction of forts along the English coastline.

Hurst Castle was designed to protect the western entrance to the Solent, a body of water that led from the English Channel to the naval base at Portsmouth and, through Southampton Water, to the important port of Southampton. The castle was one of four fortifications that William Fitzwilliam, the Lord High Admiral, and William Paulet recommended building to strengthen the defences along the Solent; the others were at East and West Cowes, and Calshot. It was positioned on the Hurst Spit, a strip of shingle sheltering saltmarsh and mud flats, only 0.75 miles (1.21 km) across the water from the Isle of Wight. Temporary earthwork fortifications were erected on the site and, after the other three castles had been completed, work then began on Hurst in 1541 under the direction of John Mille, the financial controller, and probably Thomas Bertie, a master mason. Bertie was appointed as the castle's captain in 1542 and the work was completed by January 1544, at a cost of over £3,200. (Note: Comparing early modern costs and prices with those of the modern period is challenging. £3,200 in 1544 could be equivalent to between £1.4 million and £609 million, depending on the price comparison used. For comparison, the total royal expenditure on all the Device Forts across England between 1539–47 came to £376,500, with Sandgate Castle, for example, costing £5,584.)

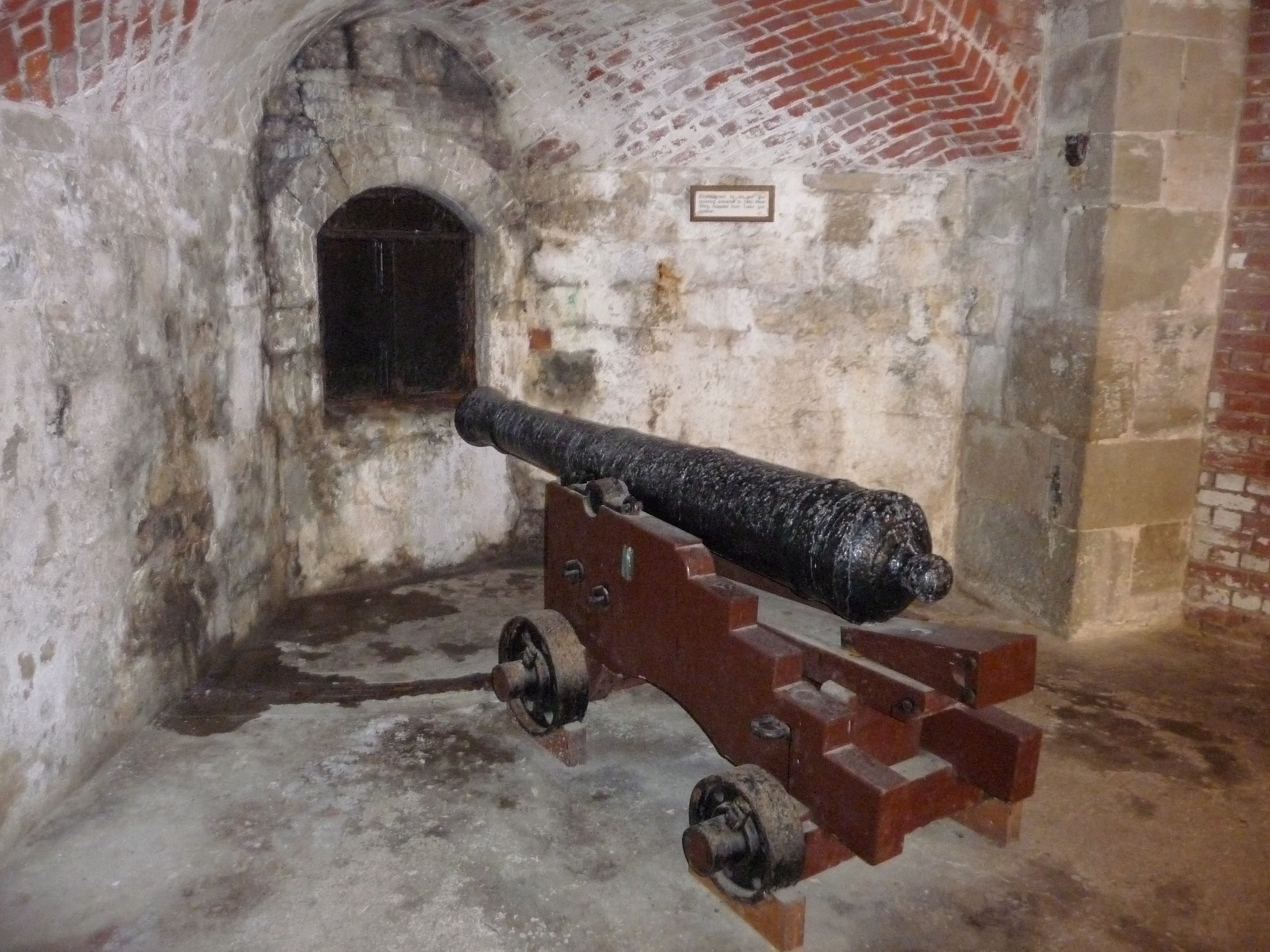
Gun embrasure in the 16th-century castle

The result was a stone artillery fort with a central keep and three bastions, surrounded by a moat, capable of holding up to 71 guns. In 1547, however, Hurst was equipped with 26 artillery pieces–four made of brass and the remainder iron–comprising a two sakers, a culverin, a demi-cannon, a curtall cannon, two demi-culverins, six portpieces, four slings, two quarter-slings, and seven bases, three of them inoperable. A 1559 survey commented that Hurst Castle was essential for sending reinforcements from the mainland to the island, and noted that it was equipped with eleven brass and iron guns, with nine further broken guns, along with handguns, bows and arrows, pikes and bills. The survey observed that the castle was vulnerable to attack because it lacked flanking protection and had rounded walls, and that it was expensive to garrison because of its size, requiring a captain, his deputy, twelve gunners, nine soldiers and a porter. The historian John Kenyon notes, however, that its considerable armament made it one of the most powerful forts in the south, even if it was equipped with lighter guns than would have been ideal for its "ship-killing" role.

Meanwhile, the invasion threat from France had passed and a lasting peace was made in 1558; government concerns shifted away from the south coast towards the Spanish threat to the south-west of England. By 1569, when Thomas Carew was serving as Hurst's captain, there were less than ten guns but the same size of garrison to that seven years before. His son, Sir Thomas Gorges, became captain in turn, and in 1593 he reported that the castle's gun platforms were in serious need of repair.

=== 17th century ===
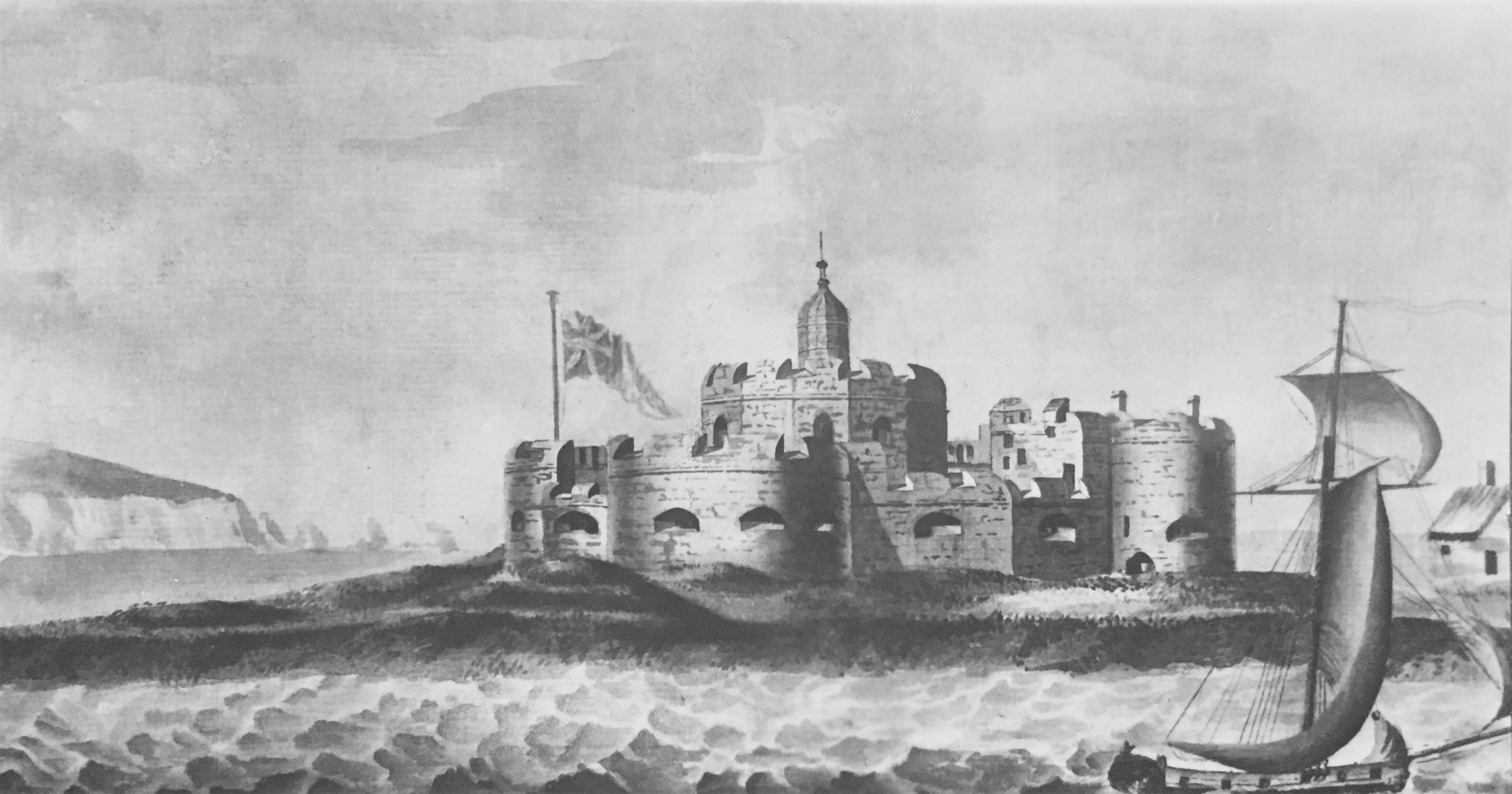
Depiction of the 18th-century castle

In the early 1600s, England was at peace with France and Spain, and the country's coastal defences received little attention. The Gorges family continued as captains at Hurst, with Sir Edward Gorges taking up the post in 1610, but the castle was neglected. Gorges was given £79 in 1611 to pay workmen to repair breaches in the spit between the mainland and castle.

In 1628, the castle was unable to prevent Flemish ships from passing along the Solent, as only four or five of the castle's twenty-seven guns were functional, and the fort had no ammunition or powder for them. The government replaced all the brass ordnance in the castle, which were preferred, particularly on ships, as they could fire faster and more safely, with iron guns in 1635.

At the beginning of the English Civil War in 1642 between the supporters of Charles I and Parliament, the castle was occupied by Captain Richard Swanley, a supporter of Parliament. In December 1648 it was briefly used to detain the King before his trial and execution. During the interregnum, it remained in use under the command of Colonel Thomas Eyre and was reinforced in 1650 to deal with the threat of a Royalist invasion.

After Charles II was restored to the throne in 1660, Eyre was dismissed and replaced by Edward Strange. The future of the castle was uncertain; Charles gave orders to demobilise the garrison and briefly considered having the fortress demolished altogether. Instead of maintaining a regular garrison, in 1666 it was decided to staff the castle using soldiers deployed from the Isle of Wight instead, from a unit belonging to Sir Robert Holmes, the island's governor. Hurst had meanwhile fallen into disrepair, delaying the plans to deploy Holmes' men until 1671. Repairs were carried out and, by 1675, a conventional garrison and almost thirty guns were stationed at Hurst.

=== 18th century ===
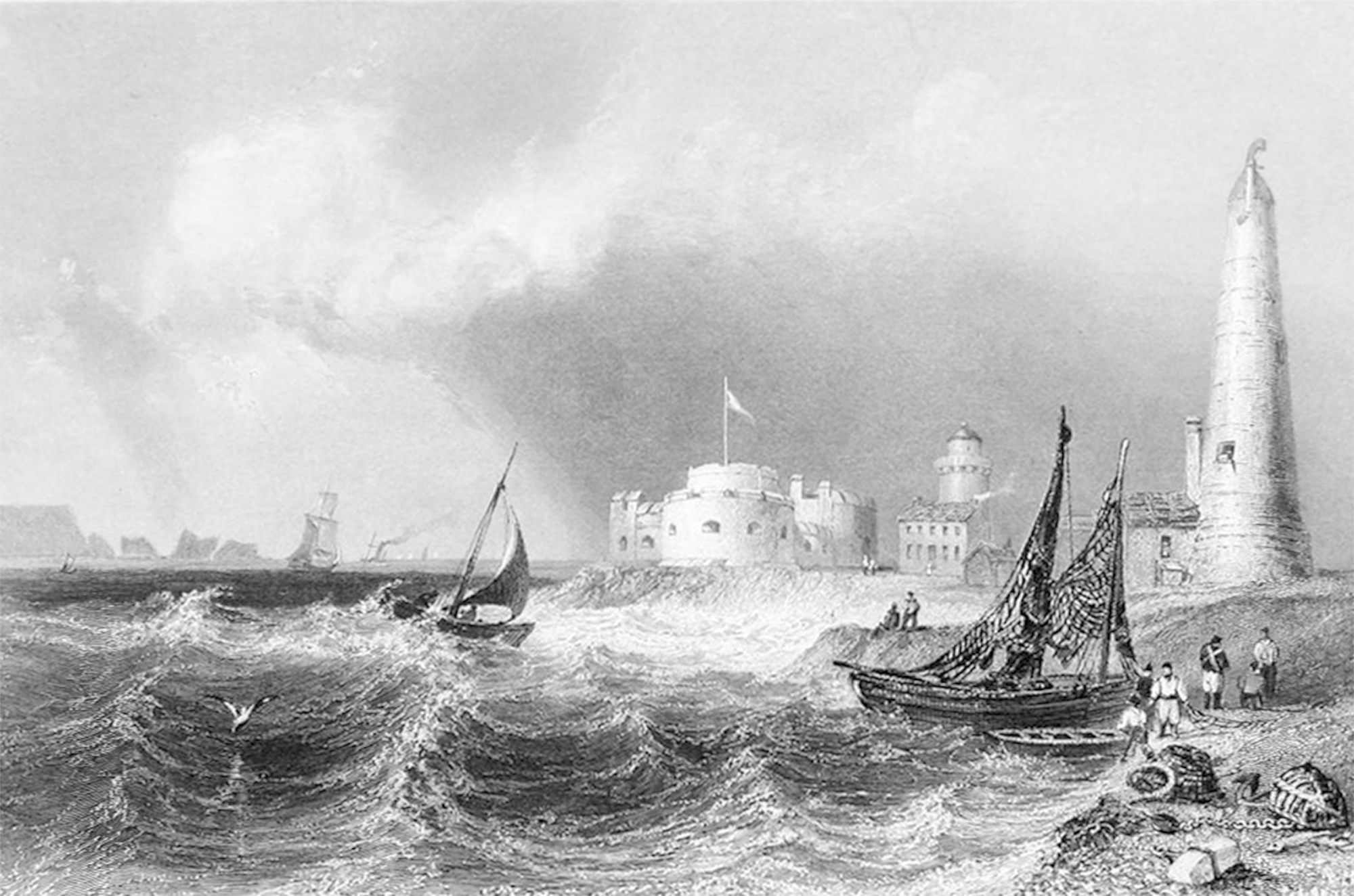
Hurst Castle in 1840, with the Hurst Tower (centre) and High Lighthouse (right)

Hurst Castle continued to be used as a military base in the 18th century, but was also used to hold a Franciscan confessor, Father Paul Atkinson. Amid concerns over the moral condition of England and a perceived threat to the established Church, an act for "further preventing the growth of popery" was passed in 1700; Hurst was chosen by the Privy Council to house any priests convicted under this law. Atkinson was probably the only person detained in this way, and he was held for 29 years from 1700 onwards, before finally dying at the castle.

There had been reported problems with smuggling around Hurst Castle since the 1670s, and these continued into the 18th century. In 1729, the Revenue service hired the Hurst, a wide, heavy yacht, to assist in anti-smuggling operations out of Southampton, arming its crew with muskets, pistols and swords. The problems persisted and, later in the century, the site was used as a rendezvous for smugglers led by a notorious criminal called John Streeter.

The castle fell into neglect, and reports from the 1770s through into the early 1790s noted extensive problems, complaining that the fort's guns could no longer be mounted on the dilapidated bastions and that water was seeping through the decaying walls. By 1793, the castle was considered to be "in the worst condition" of all the forts along the coast, and all its guns were unusable. Repairs were authorised, but little was actually done. The spit around the castle began to be used by civilians, including fishermen and gardeners; a lighthouse, called the Hurst Tower, was built there in 1786, and the Shipwright's Arms inn was established alongside the castle.

The Revolutionary War with France broke out in 1793, leading to the extensive modernisation of the castle. Repairs were carried out in 1794 at a cost of £647, followed by a review of the defences the next year by the Master-General of the Ordnance. (Note: Comparisons of 18th and 19th century costs and prices with those of the modern period vary considerably depending on the measure used. £647 in 1794 could be equivalent to between £68,000 in 2014, using a GDP Deflator, or £5.4 million, using a share of GDP measure. £4,122 in 1803 could be equivalent to between £335,000 and £21.7 million; £6,725 in 1856 to between £691,000 and £16.1 million; £211,000 in 1874 to between £19.2 million and £298.3 million.) The 16th-century castle was still strongly fortified by the standards of the time, but it could not support the heavier guns or batteries of artillery required to tackle enemy warships. Instead, two new gun batteries, each armed with five 36-pounder (16.3 kg) guns, were built alongside the castle in 1795, with a further eighteen 9-pounder (4 kg) guns mounted in the old fort; the guns concerned had all been captured from the French.

=== 19th century ===
==== 1800–58 ====
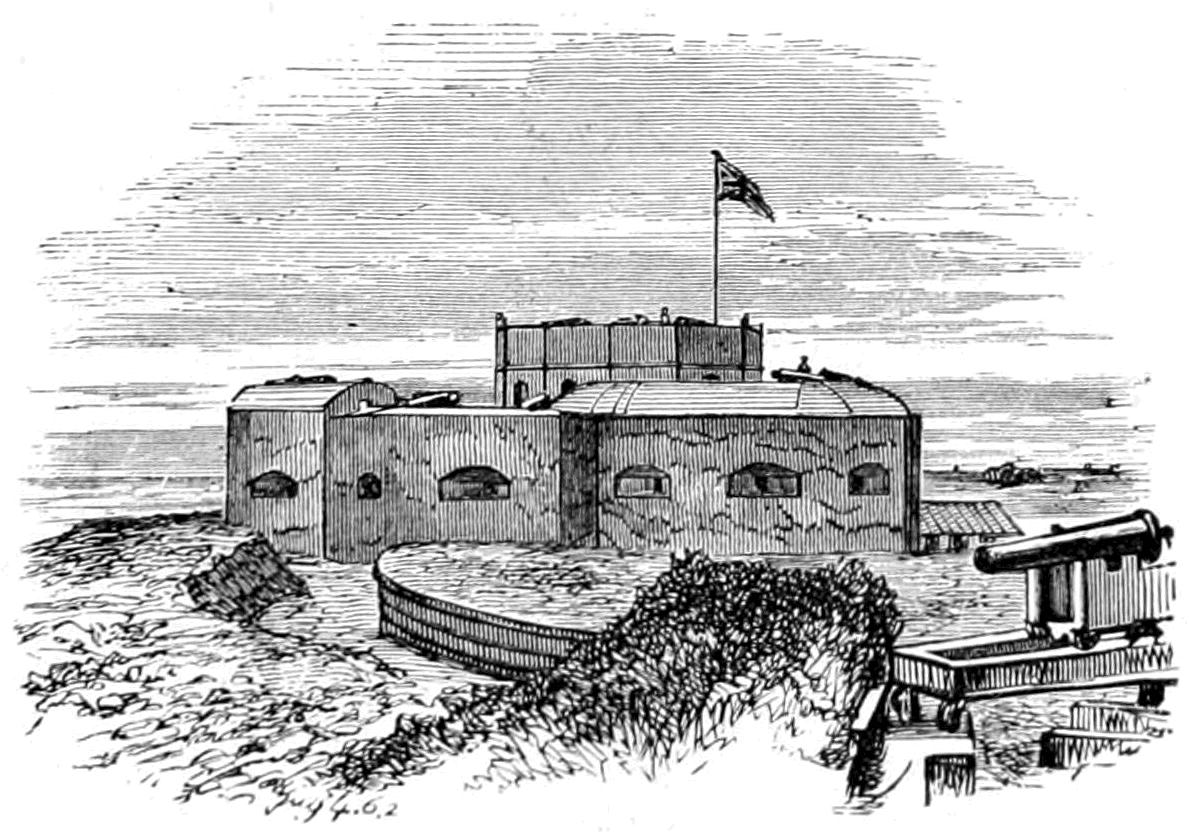
Hurst Castle, depicted in 1862, showing the new eastern gun battery (right) and redesigned 16th-century fortifications

In 1803, war with France appeared imminent once again. After some discussions, it was agreed to adapt the 16th-century keep to enable it to hold six 24-pounder (10.8 kg) guns; the roof was vaulted and a central stone pillar was installed to run up through the building, work estimated at the time to be likely to cost £4,122. The historian Andrew Saunders likens the resulting building to the various Martello towers being constructed along the south coast at this time. It was proposed to build two temporary gun batteries to replace the 1795 emplacements, which had suffered from the salt air and decayed, but the plan was turned down in order to focus attention on the redevelopment of the keep. The work was carried out by a mixture of soldiers and civilian contractors and was completed by the end of 1806.

The remodelled castle did not play an active part in the Napoleonic Wars, although it was used in 1809 as a hospital for injured soldiers returning from the Peninsular War in Spain. A second lighthouse, known as the High Lighthouse, was constructed alongside the castle in 1812.

Official interest in Hurst Castle increased again in the 1840s, as the introduction of shell guns and steam ships created a new risk that the French might successfully attack along the south coast. Previously, sailing ships had been only able to pass the castle slowly when moving against the tide, making them vulnerable to its guns; steamships threatened to cruise past at speed. Military estimates and surveys in 1850 and 1851 suggested that the armament should therefore be significantly increased, to include more and much heavier guns.

Improvements were carried out between 1852 and 1856 at a cost of over £6,725. The keep was adapted to support 32-pounder (14.5 kg) guns, the seaward-facing bastions and curtain walls were reinforced with brick casemates and new gun positions, and the moat was deepened to protect against any surprise attack. Two batteries were built to the west and east of the castle, protected by shingle and earth and linked to the old castle by covered passageways called caponiers; a defensible barrack block was built beside the western battery, to provide further protection against any attack from the land. The result was that Hurst was re-established as a powerful fortification, equipped with fourteen 32-pounder guns, fifteen 8-inch (203 mm) shell guns and two 32-pounder carronades; in wartime, these required a team of 440 men, with a peacetime garrison of 105 soldiers. Fort Albert was built across the water on the Isle of Wight to provide supporting fire. The old inn was first reused as the garrison canteen and then demolished.

The 1852, the Isle of Wight Electric Company laid a specially-armoured telegraph cable to link the castle with Keyhaven on the mainland and Sconce Point on the island; two years later, the Electric Telegraph Company linked the castle to Southampton. Hurst used flags to pass on telegraphic messages to and from shipping entering the Solent.

==== 1859–99 ====
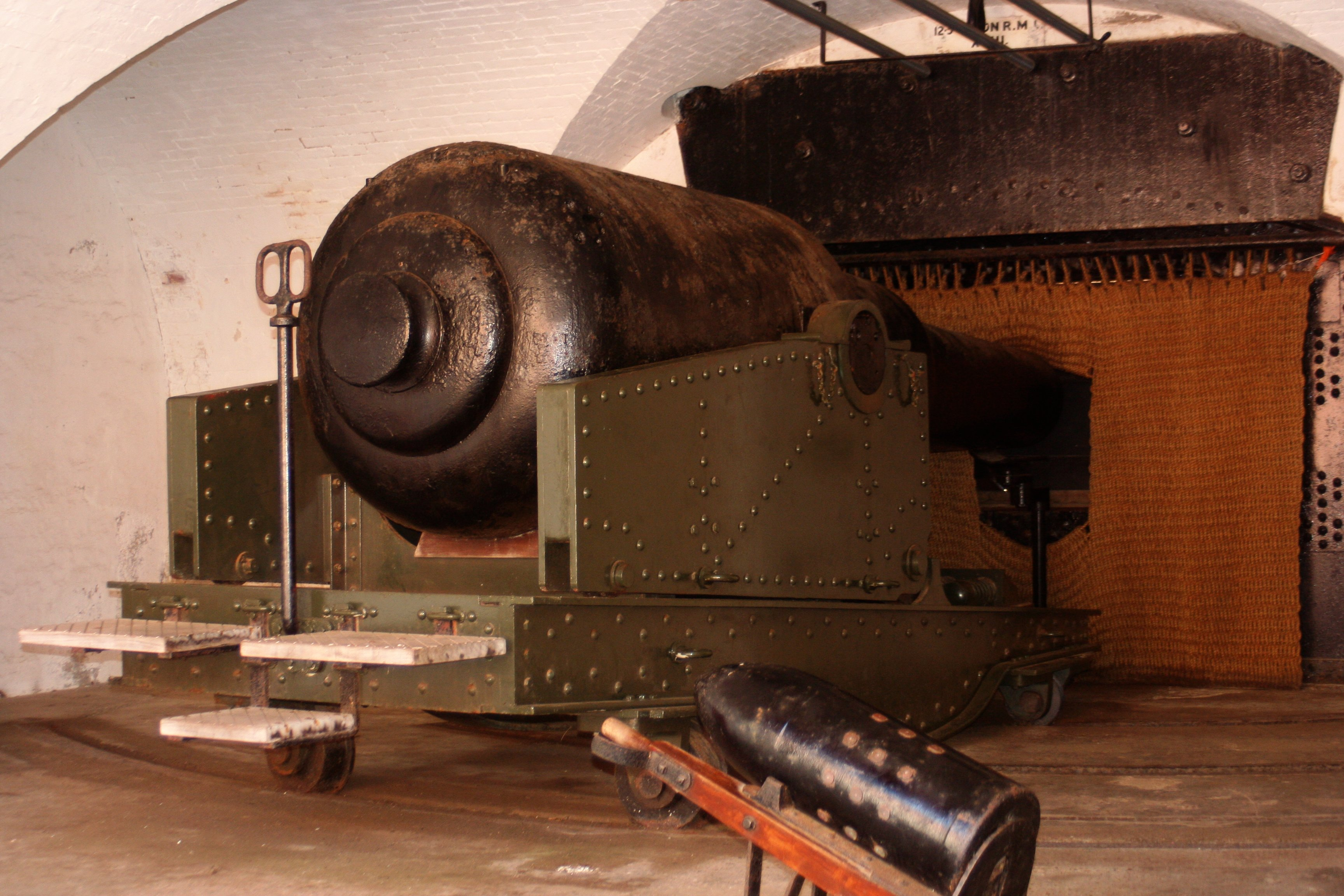
12.5 inch, 38 ton (317 mm, 39,000 kg) rifled muzzle-loading (RML) gun and shell in the West Wing

Rapid advances in military technology made the new defences obsolete before the end of the decade. The introduction of rifled breech-loading guns, capable of firing explosive shells, and the construction of armour-plated warships left Hurst's guns and fortifications inadequate. Fears grew in 1859 that France might invade England, potentially in a surprise attack. A 1859 Royal Commission recommended that Hurst, as one of the key forts protecting Portsmouth, should be upgraded as a matter of priority.

Hurst was equipped with new heavy, RML guns in heavily protected casemated positions. These weapons were slow to reload, so to ensure that the castle would have a good chance of hitting enemy ships passing at speed, two long batteries of weapons were built onto either side of the old castle, a west wing with 37 gun positions and an east wing with 24 positions. These were built on top of the two gun batteries constructed there a few years before and also required the castle's moat to be filled in. As work progressed, the decision was taken to reinforce the batteries with additional iron shields.

The work eventually cost £211,000; it began in 1861, with the majority of the work being completed by 1870 and the additional iron shielding by 1874. In peacetime, the castle held around 131 officers and men but it would have needed to be substantially reinforced during wartime if all the weapons were to be manned. Although the fort never received its full complement of guns, by 1881 it had ten 12.5 inch, 38 ton (317 mm, 39,000 kg) rifled muzzle-loading (RML) guns, fifteen 10 inch, 18 ton (254 mm, 18,000 kg) RML guns, five 9 inch, 12 ton (228 mm, 12,000 kg) RML guns, and 3 64-pounders (29 kg), together forming a powerful arsenal.

Two new lighthouses were constructed in the 1860s. The first was the "Low Light" built into the rear wall of the west wing of the castle. The second lighthouse was the "High Light" – the free standing Hurst Point Lighthouse built on the end of Hurst Spit between 1865 and 1867. A new public house, the Castle Inn, was established on the north end of the spit. A narrow-gauge railway was constructed in the 1880s to move supplies into the castle.

By the 1880s and 1890s, both the power of naval artillery and the speed of warships had further increased, leading to further investment in the castle between 1888 and 1893. The keep's magazine, which could hold up to 2,250 shells, was reinforced with concrete and the south bastion of the old castle was filled in with shingle and concrete for additional protection. New 6-pounder (2.7 kg) quick-firing guns were installed in a battery on the end of the east wing, supported by machine guns, to enable them to target fast moving vessels, particularly the new torpedo boats. Further emplacements for 12-pounder (5.4 kg) guns followed, including one on the top of the keep.

Thomas Clarke, one of the executed leaders of the Easter Rising in Dublin in 1916, was born in Hurst Castle.

=== 20th and 21st centuries ===
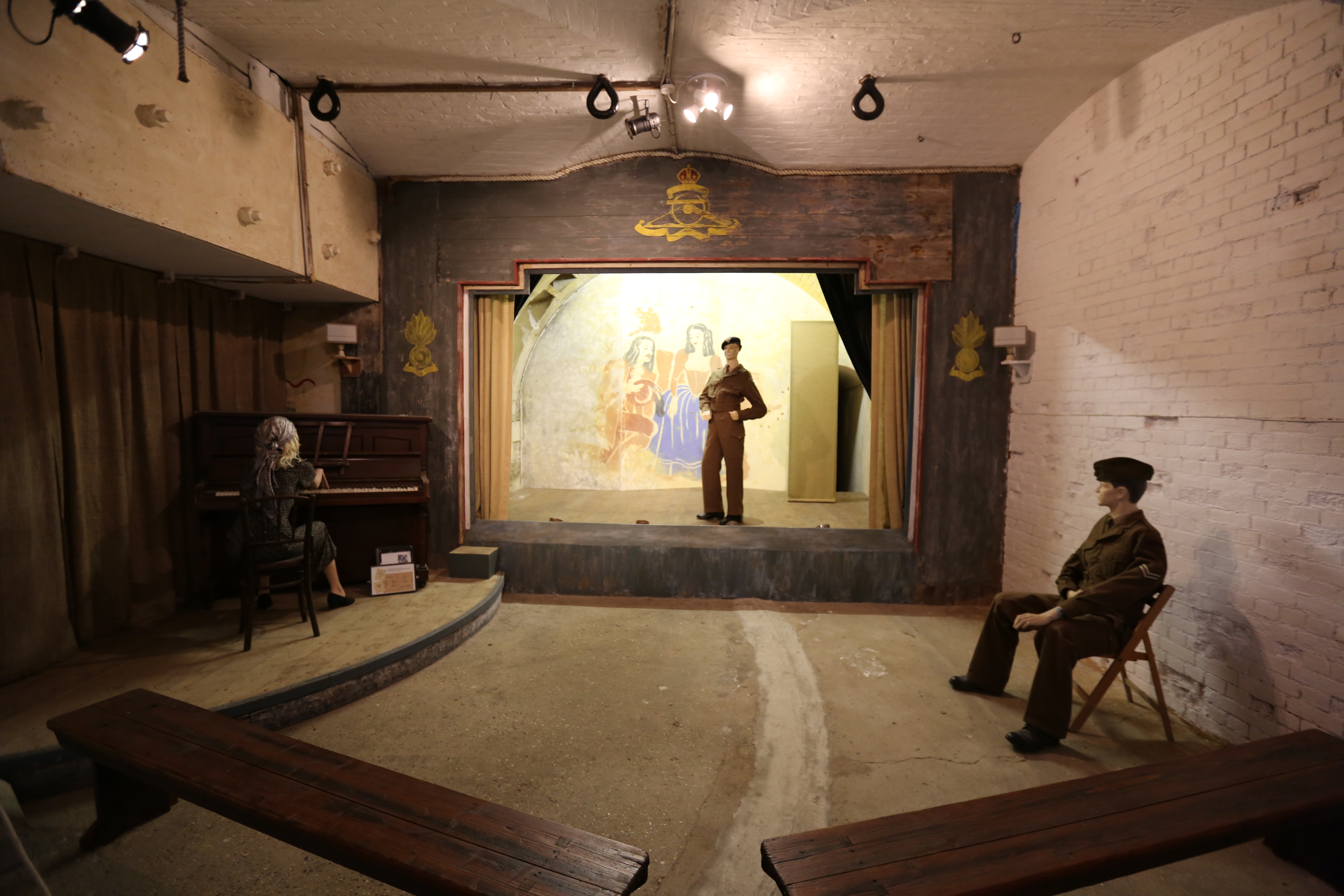
The theatre in the West Wing, with surviving original wall paintings from the Second World War

By the First World War, the guns installed at Hurst Castle in the 1870s were obsolete. The castle retained seventeen of them, as historian Coad states, wired up together "like a collection of elderly blunderbusses", but the fort depended on its newer quick-firing weapons. During the war, Hurst's armament was controlled from Needles Battery, where a Fire Command Post, equipped with telegraphy, had been established. (Note: The other artillery positions controlled as part of the same network were the Cliff End, Warden Point, New Needles and Freshwater Redoubt batteries.) After the war, the guns were removed from the 16th-century part of the castle, which was passed into the national collection of the Ministry of Works in 1933, although some modernisation of the rest of the fortification took place in the 1930s. The "low light" was replaced by a new iron lighthouse in 1911.

During the Second World War, Hurst was re-armed in 1940 with two 12-pounder (5.4 kg) guns and a unit of the Isle of Wight Rifles was stationed there, controlled from the Fire Control Needles. Searchlights and two more 6-pounder (2.7 kg) guns followed the next year, when the 37-strong detachment was retitled the 129 Coastal Battery Royal Artillery, followed by the installation of Bofors anti-aircraft guns. A tower, called the Director Tower, was built along the west wing. As the war progressed, the weapons were stood down and the battery finally closed in July 1945, with most of the weapons being removed after the war.

In 1956 the whole of Hurst Castle was transferred to the guardianship of the Ministry of Works. During the 1970s, the additional concrete protection added to the south bastion in the 1880s was removed. When the government agency English Heritage was formed in 1983, it took over the control of the castle. In 1996 the Friends of Hurst Castle took on the day-to-day management of the castle, with English Heritage continuing to run other aspects of the site. As of 2015, the castle received around 40,000 visitors a year. The castle is protected under UK law as an ancient monument. The High Lighthouse built in 1867 continues in use, and is protected as a grade II listed building. The spit and the adjoining coastline is protected as an SSSI.

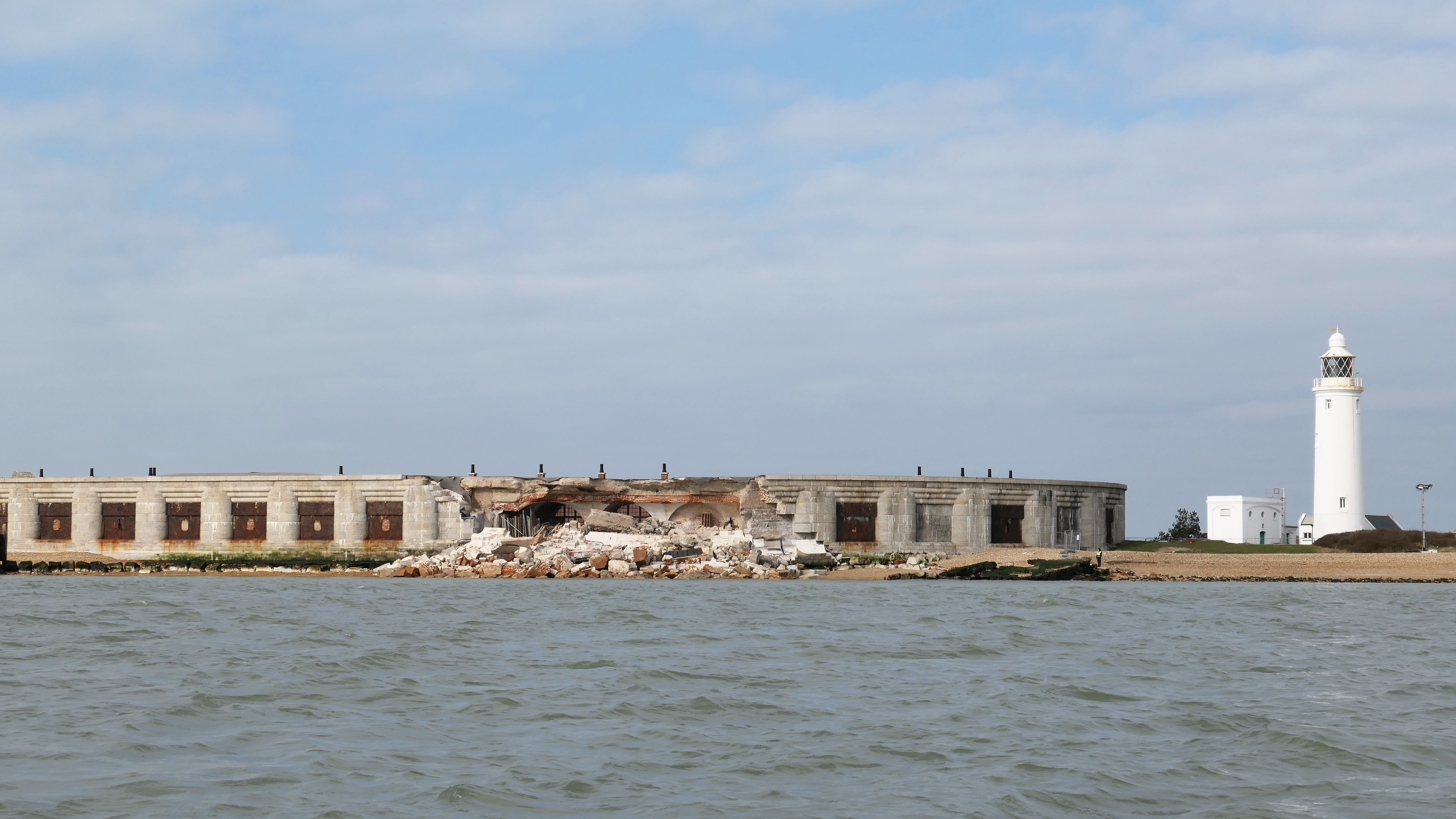
Damage to the eastern wing due to partial collapse on 26 February 2021

The spit is subject to coastal erosion which has gradually pushed the spit towards the shore, a process which has eaten away at the remnants of the 1852 west wing battery and barracks, and has exposed the foundations of the later fortress on occasions. This erosion has increased significantly since the 1940s, due to the construction of groyne barriers at nearby Bournemouth and Christchurch which prevented the natural renewing of the spit with pebbles washed from local cliffs. Government efforts began in the 1960s to try to stabilise the spit in its current position, both to protect the castle and neighbouring towns, with over 900,000 tonnes (990,000 tons) of gravel being laid down in the 1990s, and is continuing in the 21st century. Erosion caused fresh damage to the eastern end of the castle in early 2013, leading to renewed concerns.

In January 2021, local media reported that the castle was in urgent need of repairs due to coastal erosion and the wall of the eastern wing partially collapsed on 26 February 2021. Efforts to repair the damaged wall commenced the following month, using shingle and granite to stabilise the section of the wall still intact and build a protective revetment, which was completed in June of that year. English Heritage reported that the full repair effort would take 'many months' to complete.

In October 2021, the castle and lighthouse together were among 142 sites across England to receive part of a £35-million grant from the government's Culture Recovery Fund. In September 2022, it was one of six English castles included in a fundraising campaign by English Heritage to mitigate risks of destruction due to worsening coastal erosion. They hope to gather enough funds to repair and strengthen the sea walls around the castle.

== Architecture ==
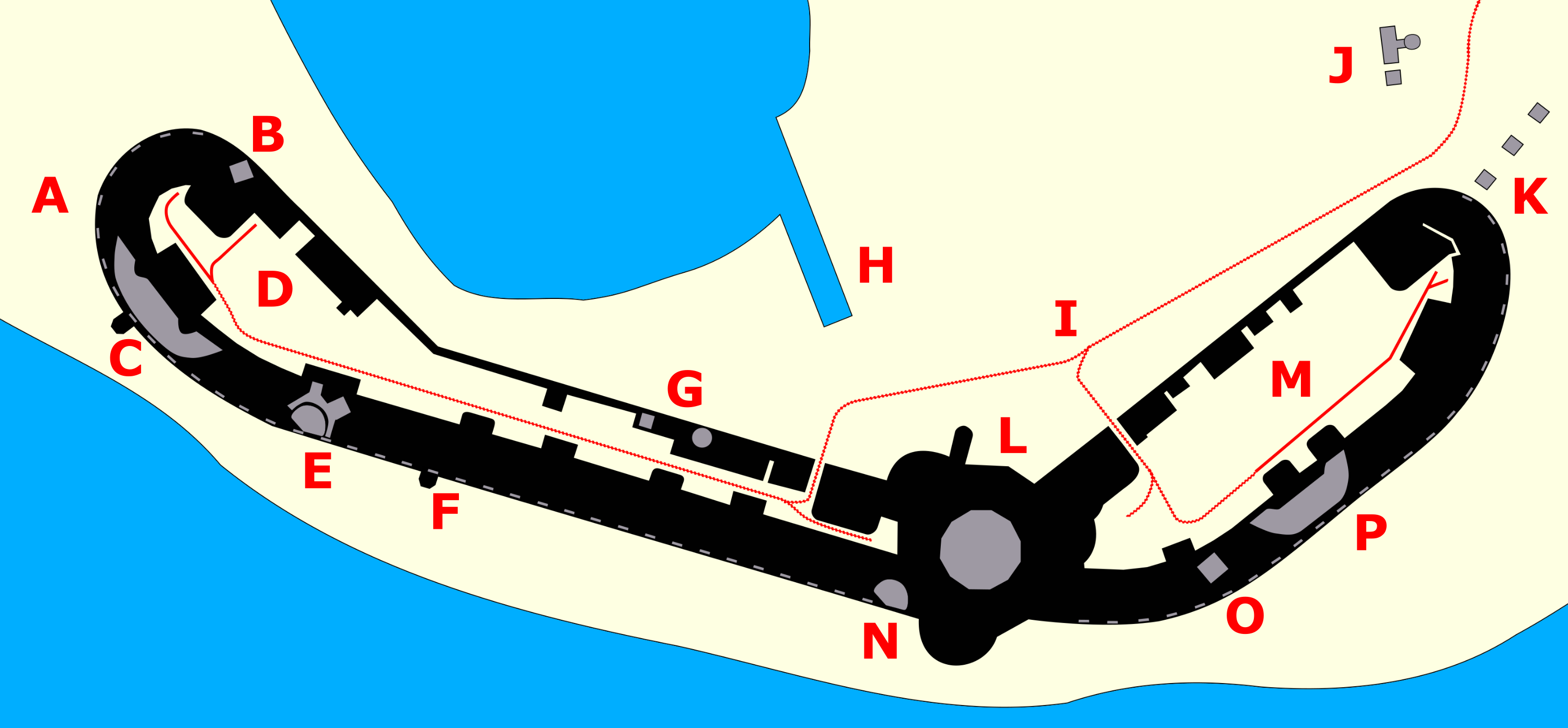
Modern plan; A – site of old battery; B – position finder cell / battery command post; C – 12-pounder QF emplacements, Bofors gun position and searchlight tower; D – West Wing; E – 6-pounder QF emplacement and the Director Tower; F – searchlight tower; G – Metal light and Low Light; H – ferry; I – railway line, actual and disused; J – High Light; K – 12-pounder battery; L – 16th-century castle; M – East Wing; N – 6-pounder QF emplacement; O – Bofors gun position; P – gun directing position

=== Central castle ===
The central castle was originally constructed in the 16th century but heavily redeveloped in the early and middle years of the 19th century. It comprises a central tower with three bastions to its north-west, north-east and south, approximately 52 metres (171 ft) across. A curtain wall with gun positions originally linked the three bastions, but this was substantially altered with the addition of walls and chambers to produce a deeper structure. The central castle forms the entrance to the rest of the fortification and is accessed through a gateway dating from 1873. The 16th-century moat that protected the castle was filled in during the 1860s.

The twelve-sided central tower, or keep, is approximately 20 metres (66 ft) across; it has two storeys and a basement. The inside of the tower is circular, with a spiral staircase running up through a central pillar. The ground floor and first floor rooms would have originally been sub-divided to form living quarters for the garrison, but are now open spaces. Both have eight embrasure windows, suitable for holding lighter weaponry; the first-floor room was sufficiently elevated to have potentially fired out over the external walls. The roof has the remains of gun positions dating from the 1850s and was originally topped by a look-out tower, removed in 1805. When first built, the keep was linked by three bridges to the outer bastions.

The two-storied north-west bastion protected the castle against attack along the spit from the mainland, and housed the castle's original portcullis as well as providing accommodation for the garrison. It had three levels of gun positions on its ground floor, first floor, and roof, which were adapted in the 19th century to house heavier weapons and shelter riflemen. The bastion links to an external caponier, a covered walkway with rifle loops for close defence, built in 1852. The north-east and south-east bastions are only one storey tall, originally holding two levels of gun positions on the ground floor and roofs, again both adapted to support heavier guns in the 19th century.

=== West and East Wings ===
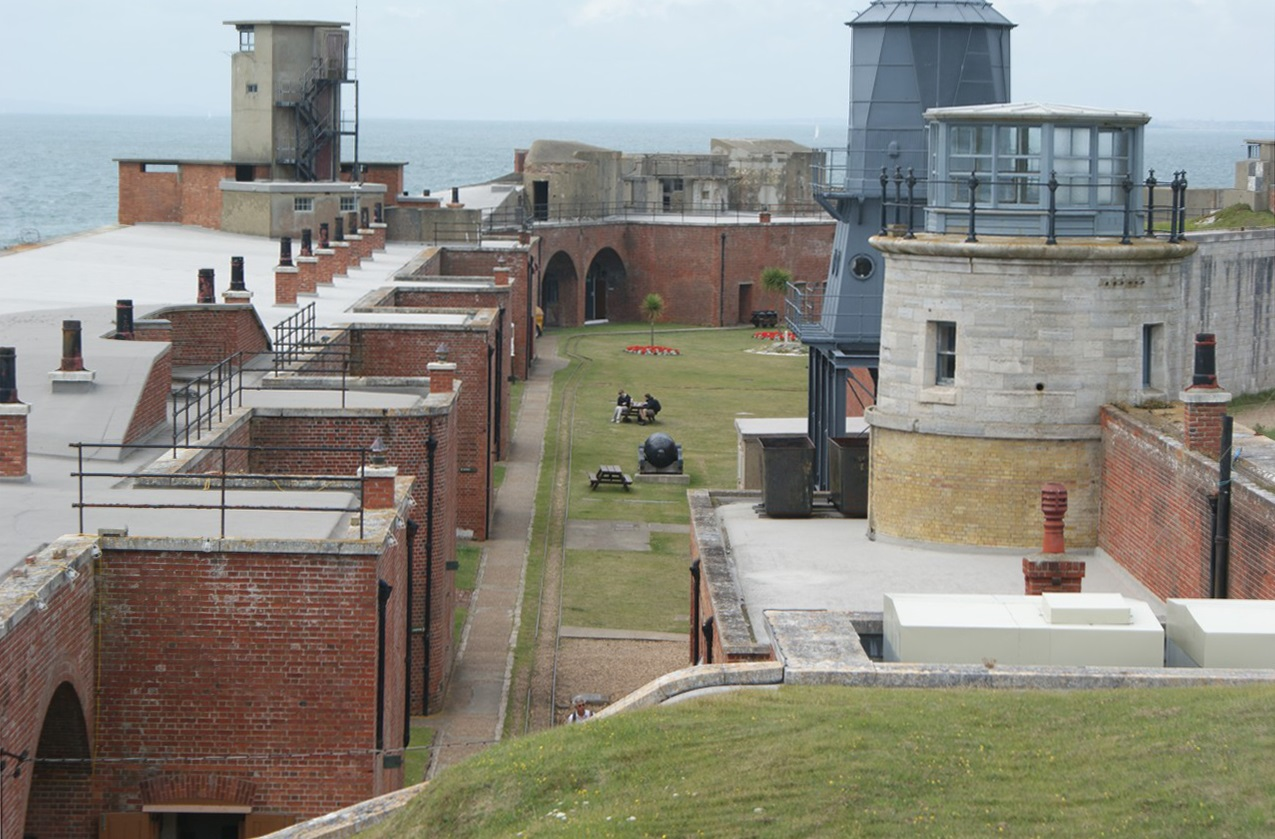
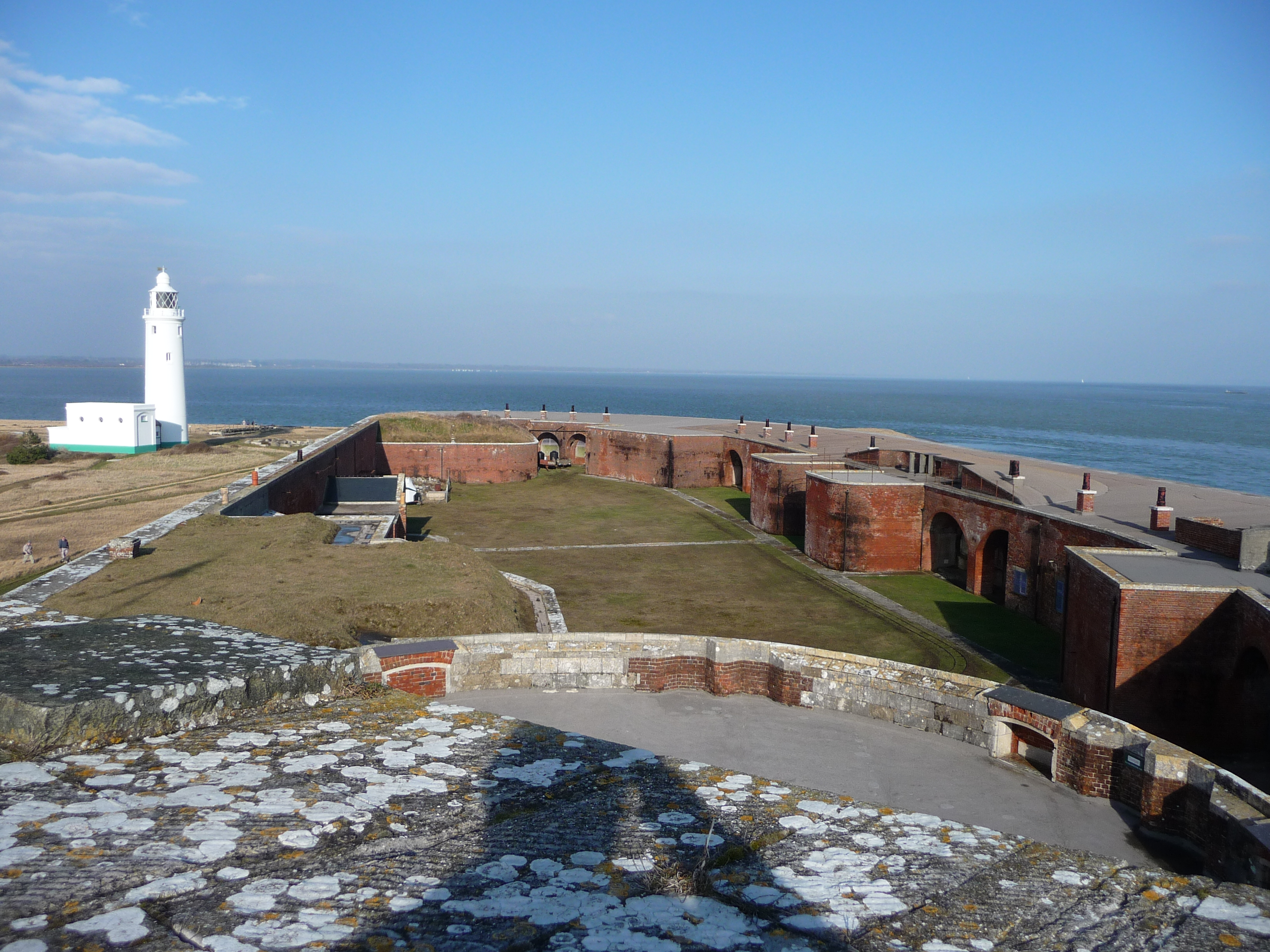
The interior of the west and east wings (left and right) constructed between 1861 and 1874

The West and East Wing date from the 1860s and are built from brick and stone. They had a lines of gun positions, each designed to hold a heavy gun and a crew of up to 12 men. The positions were protected by granite-fronted casemates and wrought-iron shields, and, with removable window screens, doubled as living accommodation for the crews. Small magazines were positioned behind the lines of casemates.

The West Wing is approximately 215 metres (705 ft) long, and has 37 heavy gun positions and two main magazines, along with various auxiliary buildings, including canteens, stores and detention facilities. It also has two of the castle's lighthouses, an 1865 tower, now disused, and an iron, gas-lit tower, still in use. The garden is a recreation of the garden in the Second World War. The late-19th century and early-20th guns at the castle were predominantly added to the West Wing, and it roof supports emplacements for 12- and 6-pounder (5.4 and 2.7 kg) quick-firing guns, a Bofors gun and associated directing positions. A small theatrical theatre, built by gunners in the Second World War, survives in one of the gun positions, along with various wall paintings, possibly used in performances.

The East Wing is relatively unaltered since its construction. It is approximately 150 metres (490 ft) long, with 24 heavy gun positions and two main magazines; on the roof is the original gun directing position and a Bofors gun position added during the Second World War. It is reached through a gateway in the north-east bastion. Just beyond the East Wing are three 6-pounder quick-firing gun emplacements from 1893, which were fed ammunition from the wing through a hole in the outer wall.

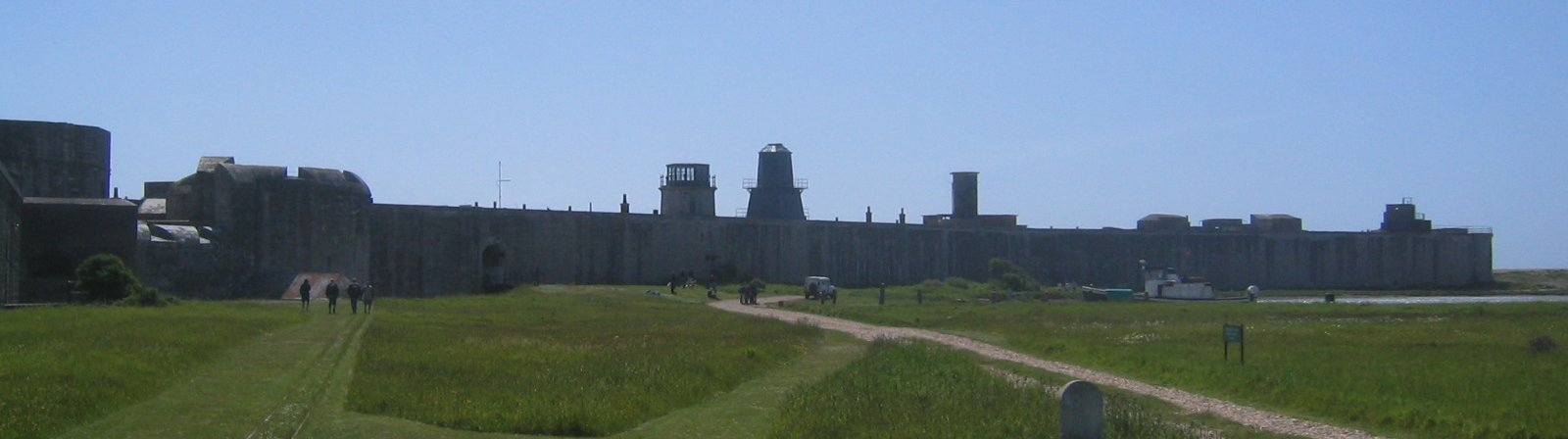
The castle seen from the east of Hurst Spit

== Captains and Governors ==
- 1643–1645 John Button
- 1659– Thomas Eyre
- 1661– Edward Strange (Captain)
- 1675–1683 Sir John Holmes (by purchase)
- 1683–1695 Henry Holmes
- 1695–1698 John Burrard
- 1702–1714 Henry Holmes
- 1716–1721 Sir Tristram Dillington, 5th Baronet
- 1721– Major John Huske (Lieutenant-Governor)
- 1745– Sir Henry Bellenden
- 1761– George Anderson
- 1767–?1795 Lt-Gen Sir Robert Sloper
- 1796–1801 Maj-Gen William Gardiner
- 1801– Lt-Col John Creighton

== See also ==
- British narrow gauge military railways

== Bibliography ==
- Biddle, Martin; Hiller, Jonathon; Scott, Ian; Streeten, Anthony (2001). Henry VIII's Coastal Artillery Fort at Camber Castle, Rye, East Sussex: An Archaeological Structural and Historical Investigation. Oxford, UK: Oxbow Books. ISBN 0-904220-23-0.
- Chatterton, E. Keble (2008) [1912]. The Fine Art of Smuggling: King's Cutters Versus Smugglers, 1700–1855. Tucson, US: Fireship Press. ISBN 978-1-934757-19-2.
- Coad, J. G. (1985). "Hurst Castle: The Evolution of a Tudor Fortress 1790–1945". Post-Medieval Archaeology. 19: 63–104. doi:10.1179/pma.1985.005.
- Coad, J. G. (1990). Hurst Castle, Hampshire (2nd ed.). London, UK: English Heritage. ISBN 1-85074-053-4.
- Coad, Jonathan (2013). Calshot Castle: Hampshire (revised ed.). London, UK: English Heritage. ISBN 978-1-85074-102-2.
- Fry, Sebastian (2014). "'Heritage Under Fire': Hadrian's Wall, Avebury and the Second World War". Research Report Series. Portsmouth, UK: English Heritage. ISSN 2046-9799.
- Hale, J. R. (1983). Renaissance War Studies. London, UK: Hambledon Press. ISBN 0-907628-17-6.
- Harrington, Peter (2007). The Castles of Henry VIII. Oxford, UK: Osprey Publishing. ISBN 978-1-4728-0380-1.
- Hayton, David (1990). "Moral Reform and Country Politics in the Late Seventeenth-Century House of Commons". Past & Present. 128 (128): 48–91. doi:10.1093/past/128.1.48.
- Hunt, Abbey (2011). "English Heritage Coastal Estate: Risk Assessment". Research Department Report Series. Portsmouth, UK: English Heritage. ISSN 1749-8775.
- Kenyon, J. R. (1979). "An Aspect of the 1559 Survey of the Isle of Wight: The State of all the Quenes maties Fortresses and Castelles". Post-Medieval Archaeology. 13: 61–77. doi:10.1179/pma.1979.002. ISSN 0079-4236.
- King, D. J. Cathcart (1991). The Castle in England and Wales: An Interpretative History. London, UK: Routledge Press. ISBN 978-0-415-00350-6.
- Manning, T.; Stewart, S. (1997). Wall Painting Condition Audit, Hurst Castle Hampshire. London, UK: English Heritage.
- Morley, B. M. (1976). Henry VIII and the Development of Coastal Defence. London, UK: Her Majesty's Stationery Office. ISBN 0-11-670777-1.
- Morley, Geoffrey (1994). The Smuggling War: The Government's Fight Against Smuggling in the 18th and 19th Centuries. London, UK: Alan Sutton. ISBN 978-0-7509-0349-3.
- Saunders, Andrew (1989). Fortress Britain: Artillery Fortifications in the British Isles and Ireland. Liphook, UK: Beaufort. ISBN 1-85512-000-3.
- Thompson, M. W. (1987). The Decline of the Castle. Cambridge, UK: Cambridge University Press. ISBN 1-85422-608-8.
- Walton, Steven A. (2010). "State Building Through Building for the State: Foreign and Domestic Expertise in Tudor Fortification". Osiris. 25 (1): 66–84. doi:10.1086/657263. S2CID 144384757.
- Williams, John Anthony (1968). Catholic Recusancy in Wiltshire, 1660–1791. London, UK: Catholic Record Society. OCLC 61819.
