= Paul Atkinson (confessor) =

English Roman Catholic priest

Paul Atkinson (c. 1655 – 15 October 1729), born Matthew Atkinson, was an English Roman Catholic priest of the 17th and 18th centuries, during the British penal laws. He is viewed as a martyr, dying in prison for his Catholic activities.

== Life ==
He was born in Yorkshire. He joined the English Franciscan institution, Douai Abbey in 1673, and then became a Catholic missionary in England for twelve years, after this he was betrayed by a maidservant for a £100 reward.

On 26 September 1700 he was convicted and condemned to perpetual imprisonment due to his status as a Catholic priest. One governor of his prison, Hurst Castle on the Solent, allowed him to walk outside of the prison; but complaint was made of this and the leave was revoked. He died in prison in 1729 after nearly thirty years. He was buried in Winchester's Roman Catholic Cemetery.
