= Drill Hall Road Army Reserve Centre =

Military building in Newport, Isle of Wight, England

- Newport, Isle of Wight
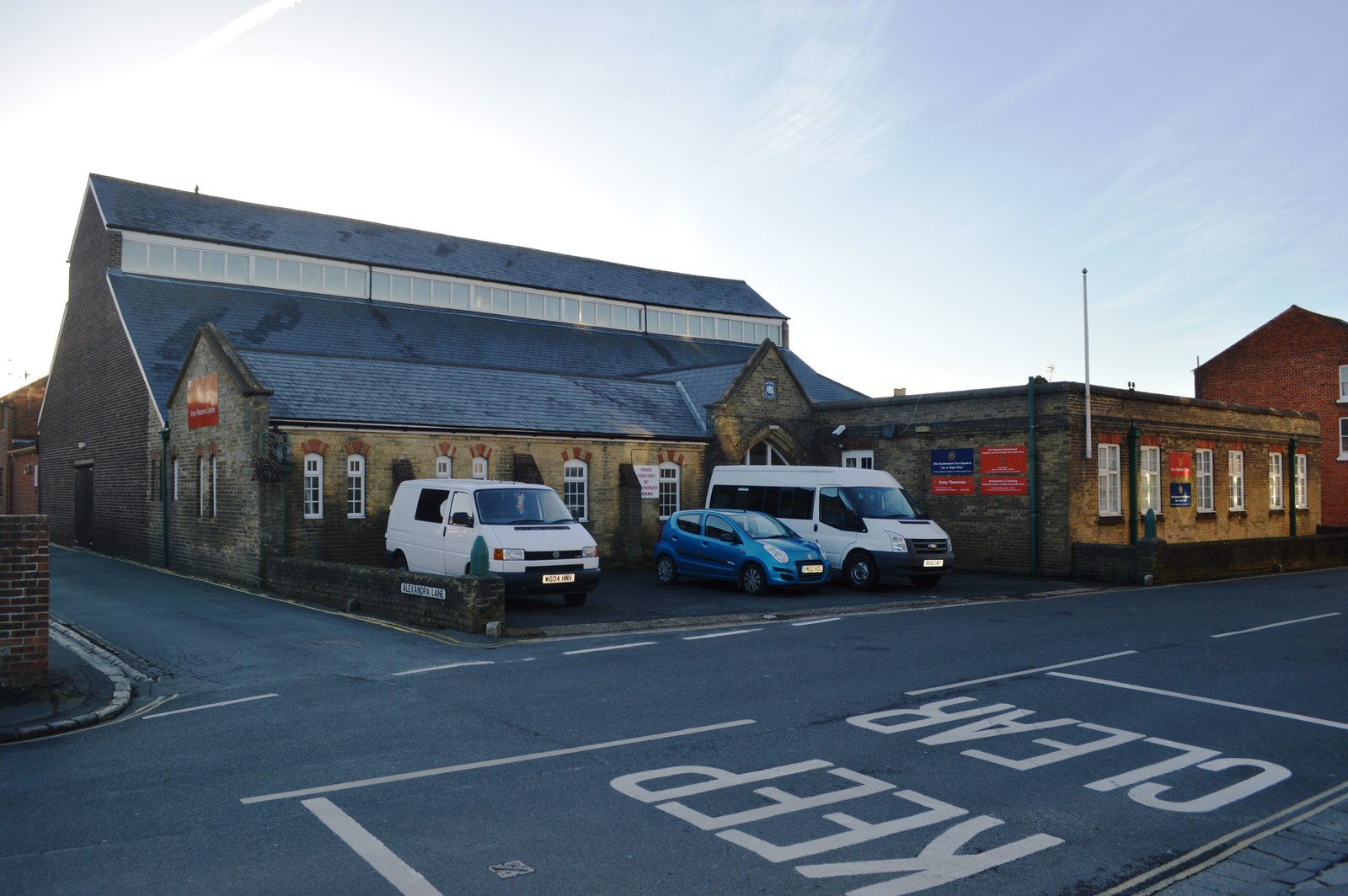
- Drill Hall Road Army Reserve Centre

Site information
- Type: Drill hall

Location
- Location in Isle of Wight
- Coordinates: 50.69899°N 1.29976°W

Site history
- Built: 1860
- Built for: War Office
- In use: 1860–Present

The Drill Hall Road Army Reserve Centre is a military installation in Newport, Isle of Wight.

== History ==
The building was designed as the headquarters of the Isle of Wight Rifle Volunteers in 1860. This unit evolved to become the 5th (Isle of Wight, Princess Beatrice's) Volunteer Battalion, The Hampshire Regiment in 1885 and the 8th Battalion, The Hampshire Regiment in 1908. The battalion was mobilised at the drill hall in August 1914 before being deployed to India. The regiment converted to the Princess Beatrice's (Isle of Wight Rifles) Heavy Regiment, Royal Artillery in 1938, a unit which evolved to become the 530th The Princess Beatrice's (Isle of Wight Rifles) Coast Regiment, Royal Artillery in 1940 and the 428th The Princess Beatrice's (Isle of Wight Rifles) Coast Regiment, Royal Artillery in 1947.

The presence at the drill hall was reduced to one battery, P (Princess Beatrice's Isle of Wight) Battery, 457th Heavy Anti-Aircraft Regiment, Royal Artillery in 1955, and to one platoon, 6 Platoon, B Company (Hampshire), 1st Battalion, Wessex Volunteers in 1971. This unit evolved to become 9 (Princess Beatrice's) Platoon, C (Duke of Connaught's) Company, 6th/7th (Volunteer) Battalion, The Princess of Wales's Royal Regiment in 1992 and 9 (Princess Beatrice's Isle of Wight Rifles) Platoon, C (Princess of Wales's Royal Regiment) Company, The Royal Rifle Volunteers in 1999 before becoming part of 165 Port & Maritime Regiment RLC, 266 Port Squadron, Royal Logistic Corps in 2006. The building remains an active Army Reserve Centre and an active Army Cadet Force Centre.
