= Cliff End Battery =

Battery on the Isle of Wight

- Cliff End, Isle of Wight, England
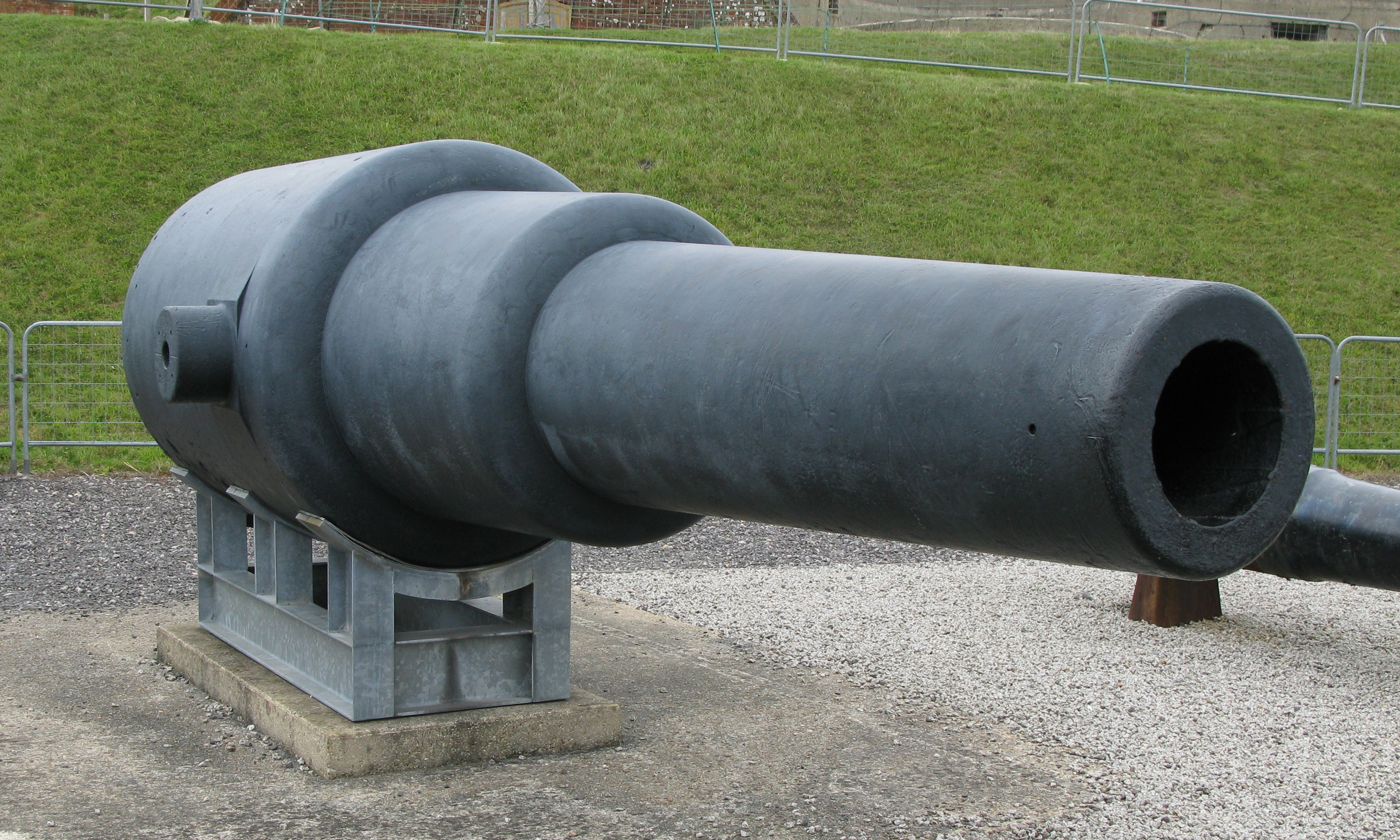
- A 12.5 inch gun from Cliff End Battery.

Site information
- Open to the public: No

Location
- Coordinates: 50°42′01″N 1°31′45″W

Site history
- Built: 1868
- In use: Holiday bungalow development
- Materials: Concrete

Cliff End Battery (map reference SZ333890) is a battery on the west coast of the Isle of Wight overlooking Fort Albert. It is one of the many Palmerston Forts built on the island to protect it in response to a perceived French invasion. Construction of the battery began in 1862 and was completed by 1868 at a cost of £32,714.

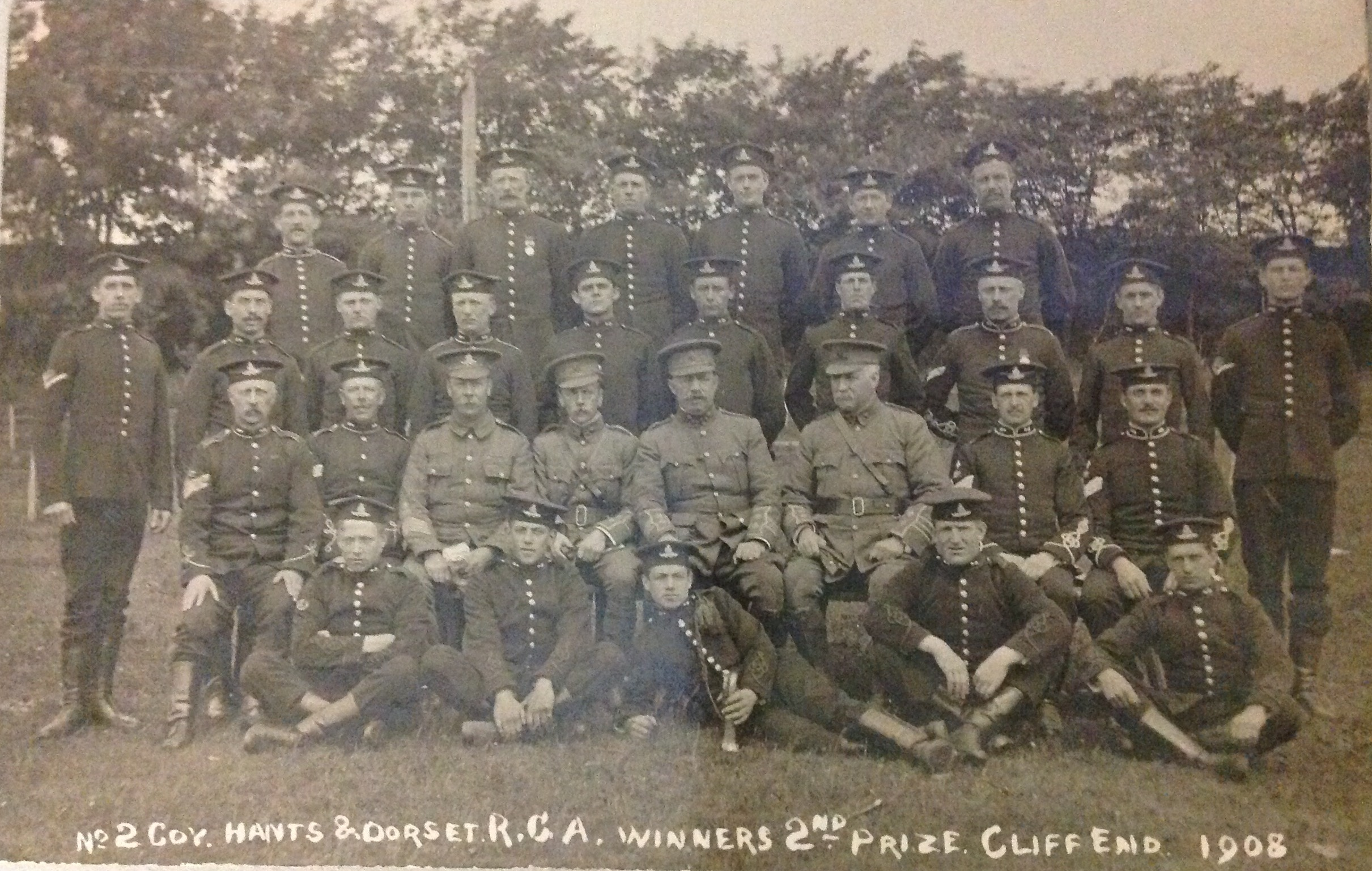
Hampshire and Dorset Royal Garrison Artillery at Cliff End, 1908

No guns were mounted until 1877 when six 12.5-inch Rifled Muzzle Loading (RML) Guns and three 10-inch Rifle Muzzle Loading Guns were installed. By 1899 the RML guns had become obsolete and were removed and replaced by four 6-inch Breech Loading (BL) guns and four 4.7-inch guns. The battery was used by volunteers and Territorial Force Artillery units for practice camps. It remained armed throughout the First and Second World Wars.

The battery was disarmed in 1951 and the site sold by the War Office in 1951. Today some of the gun emplacements remain. Much of the land is used as a site for holiday bungalows. The six 12.5-inch RML guns which were pushed over the cliff when they were dismounted after 1899 have since been recovered, with one of them now outside of Fort Albert, and two at Hurst Castle on the other side of the Needles passage. One is located at Fort Nelson, Hampshire.

== Publications ==
- Cantwell, Anthony (1986). The Needles Defences. Isle of Wight: Solent Papers. ISBN 1870113012.
- Hogg, Ian V (1974). Coast Defences of England and Wales 1856-1956. David & Charles. ISBN 0-7153 6353-0.
