= Warden Point Battery =

Artillery battery in Totland, Isle of Wight, England

- Warden Point, Isle of Wight, England
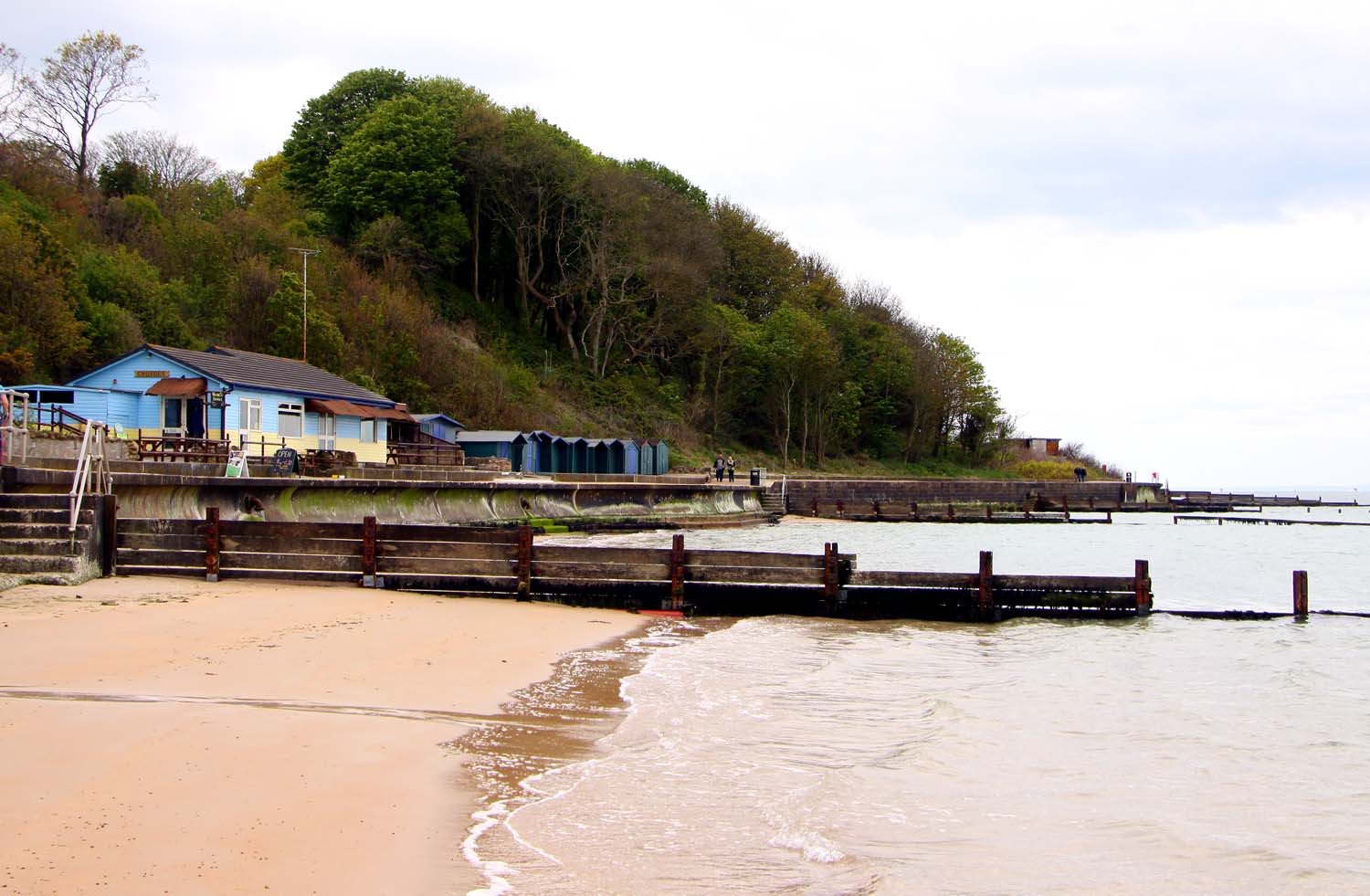
- Tree covered Warden Point

Site information
- Owner: Private residence
- Open to the public: No

Location
- Coordinates: 50°41′17″N 1°32′39″W

Site history
- Built: 1862
- In use: 1862 onwards
- Materials: Brick

Warden Point Battery is a battery on the Isle of Wight begun in 1862, that was originally armed with 7-inch and 9-inch rifled muzzle loaders on barbette mountings.

It was built in the 1890s for 9.2-inch breech loader guns. In use until 1936, and in World War II as a command post and searchlight battery. The battery was a regular polygon with central caponier on the landward side, and flanking caponiers at the North and South corners. The central caponier and North -East loopholed wall remain.

The site spent a considerable number of years after the second world war as a holiday camp. Following the closure of that, the housing estate was started. Unconfirmed information from the builders on a visit to the site suggests that some of the historic features will be retained. These include the main wall and entrance arch to the battery and some of the concrete emplacements. The latter will be built over, but protected so that they can be "re-discovered" if and when the newer buildings are demolished. At time of writing, the building work has been suspended.

It is now a Grade II Listed Building.

== Publications ==
- Cantwell, Anthony (1986). The Needles Defences. Isle of Wight: Solent Papers. ISBN 1870113012.
- Hogg, Ian V (1974). Coast Defences of England and Wales 1856-1956. David & Charles. ISBN 0-7153 6353-0.
