= Fort Albert =

Tower fort on the Isle of Wight, England

- Freshwater, Isle of Wight, England
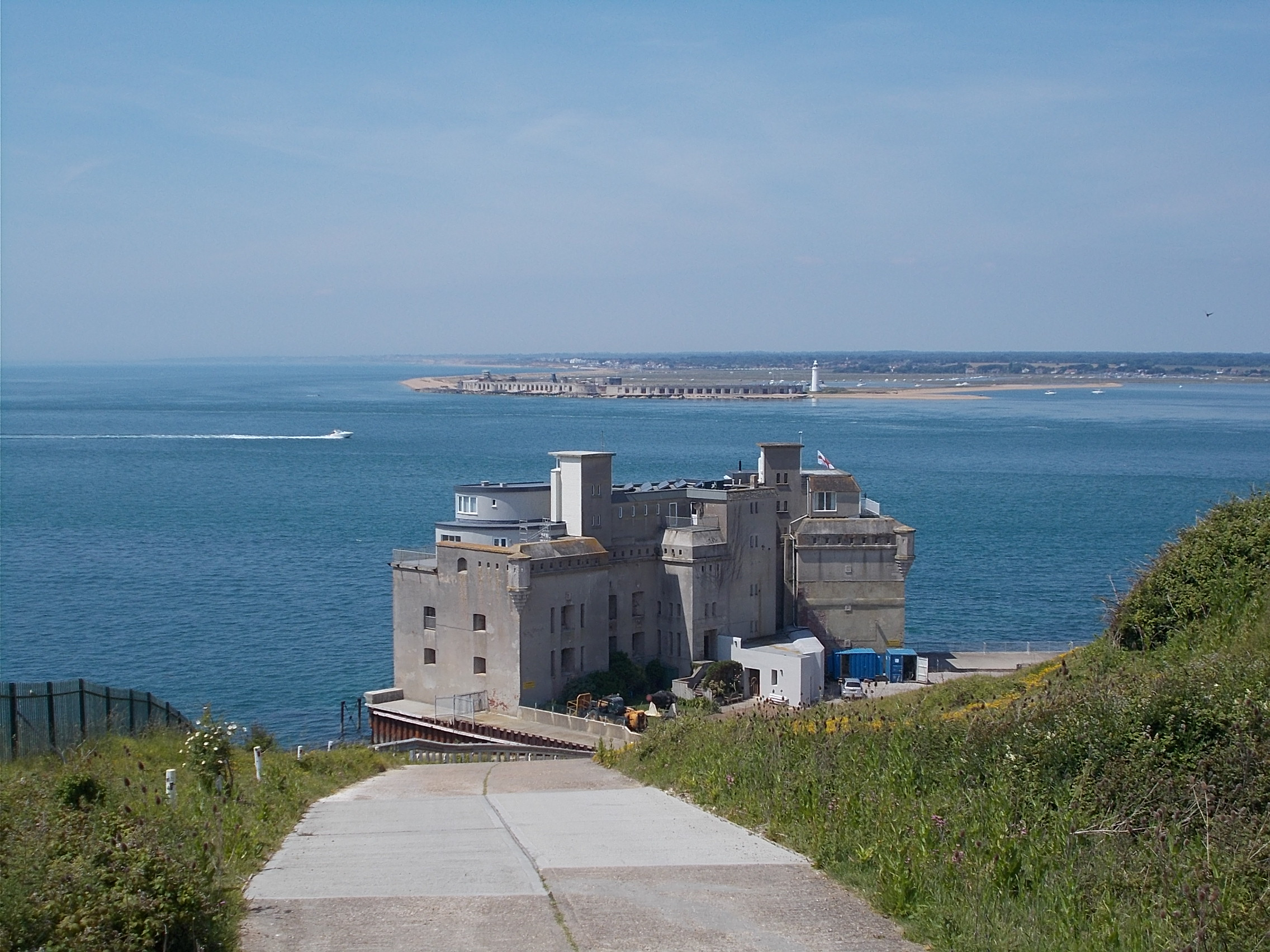
- Fort Albert, with Hurst Castle in the background

Site information
- Owner: Hunter Estates
- Open to the public: No, converted into private flats.

Listed Building – Grade II*
- Official name: Fort Albert
- Designated: 28 March 1994
- Reference no.: 1291552

Location
- Coordinates: 50°41′58″N 1°31′55″W

Site history
- Built: 1856
- In use: 1856–1858, 1886–1906, 1939–1945
- Materials: Brick and concrete

Fort Albert (map reference SZ330890) is a tower fort nestling under the cliffs south-west of Fort Victoria on the Isle of Wight, England. It was also known as Cliff End Fort, named after the Northern extremity of Colwell Bay (Cliff's End).

== History ==
Fort Albert was one of the Royal Commission forts built in the 19th century as part of Lord Palmerston's defences against the possibility of a French attack from Napoleon III. Designed to defend the Needles Passage, it was completed in 1856, after 4 years of construction, but like the American Third System forts it resembles in miniature, it would have suffered badly from rifled gunfire, so the Royal Commission enhanced it with batteries on the cliffs above. Even so, with the introduction of armoured ships, the fort became obsolete by 1858. In 1886 it was selected as one of the UK locations for the Brennan torpedo. After this, only small guns were mounted on the fort. It was closed to military use in 1957.

== Fort Albert today ==
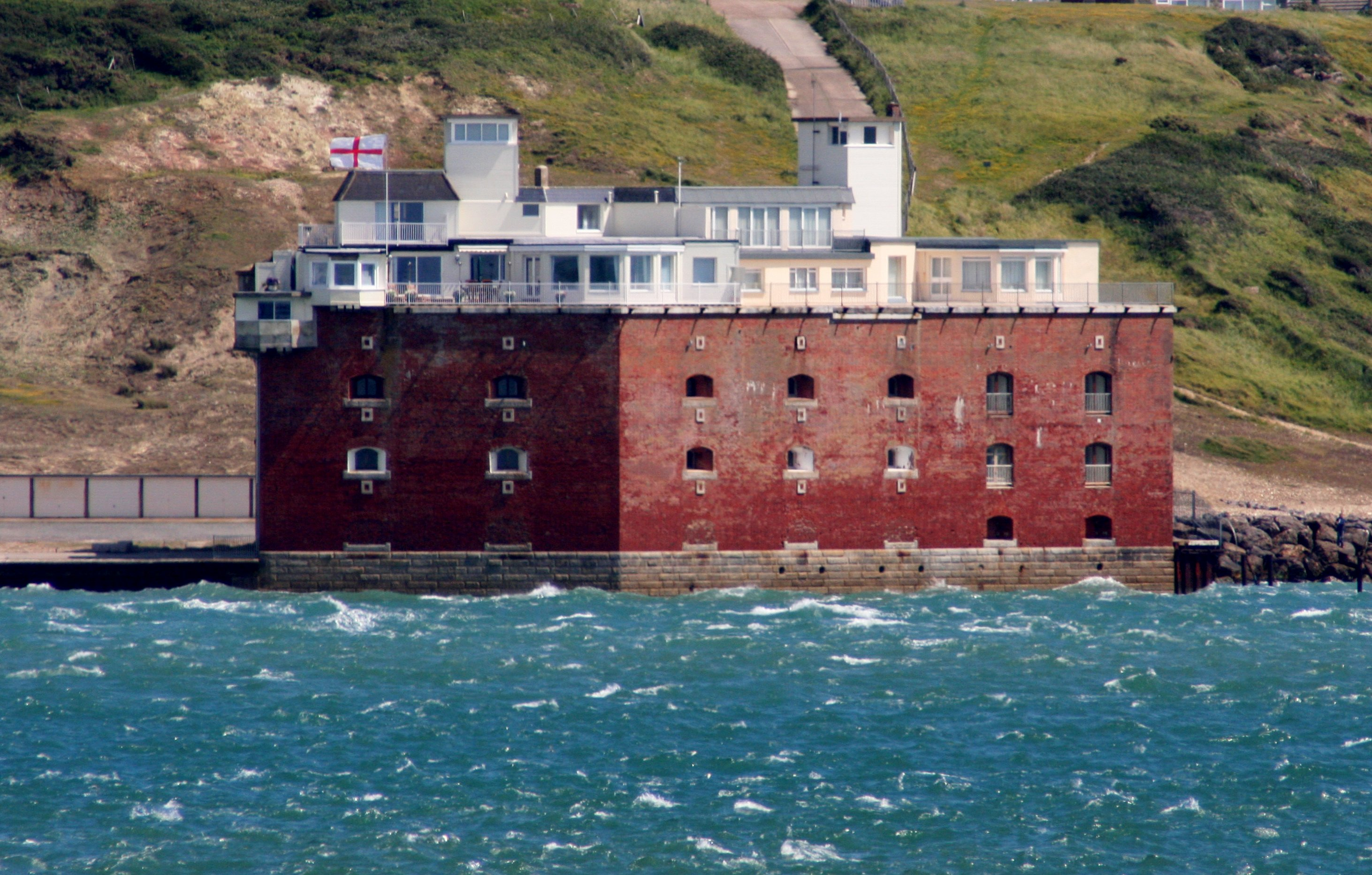
The fort as seen from Hurst Castle

The fort is in private ownership and has been converted into private flats. There is no public access, not even to the cliff tops which overlook it. It is most easily viewed from the sea, or from Hurst Castle. The battery above is part of a chalet estate at Brambles Chine.

It has been a Grade II* Listed Building since 1994.

== Publications ==
- Cantwell, Anthony (1986). The Needles Defences. Isle of Wight: Solent Papers. ISBN 1870113012.
