= Cement Mills Halt railway station =

Former railway station in England

Cement Mills Halt
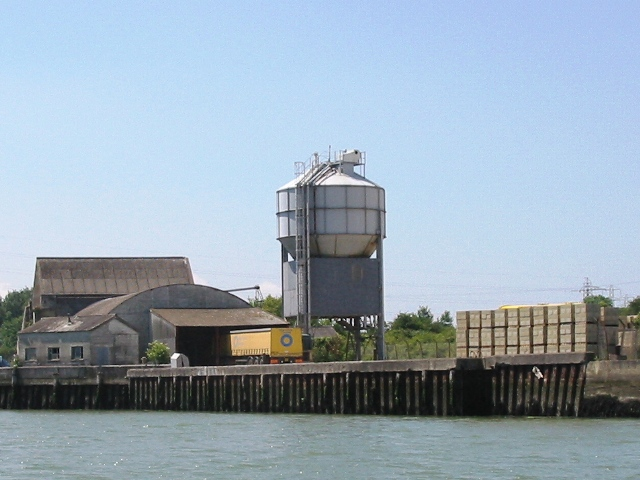
- The Cement Works the Halt served (now demolished)

General information
- Location: Inlet, River Medina, Isle of Wight; England
- Coordinates: 50.7223°N 1.2879°W
- Grid reference: SZ503917
- Platforms: 1

Other information
- Status: Disused

History
- Pre-grouping: Cowes and Newport Railway (1879-1887); Isle of Wight Central Railway (1887 to 1923)
- Post-grouping: Southern Railway (1923 to 1948); Southern Region of British Railways (1948 to 1966)

Key dates
- Poss 1879; def 1905: Opened
- 21 February 1966: Closed
Location

Cement Mills Halt was a railway station between Cowes and Newport on the Isle of Wight. It was a public railway station throughout its life, although principally used by workers at the cement works in Stag Lane. It was not included on public time tables but was available to ramblers visible enough on the primitive gas-lit platform to stop the train "on request". The trackway is now part of a national cycle route.

== West Medina Cement Works ==
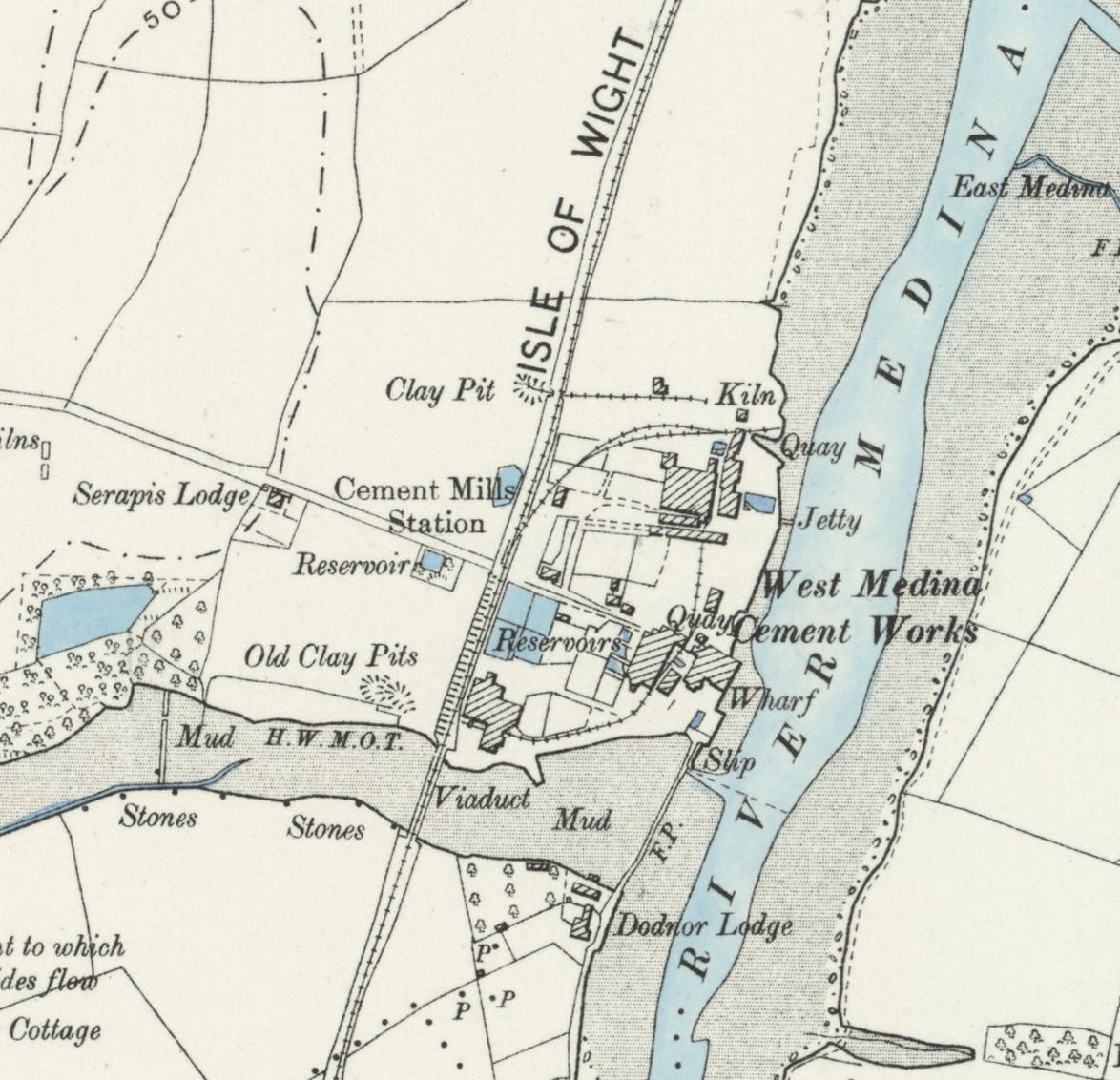
Ordnance Survey map of the station and its immediate surroundings.

Cement Mills Halt primarily served the West Medina Cement Works, which was owned and operated by Francis and Company Cement Manufacturers. Near the village of Northwood, was the extensive cement works of Messrs. Francis, Son, & Co., of Nine Elms, London, who employed about 100 people at the West Medina Cement Works in the manufacture of Portland and Medina cements. The Francis Co. had the contract to supply all the Portland cement for the construction of the fourth Eddystone Lighthouse.

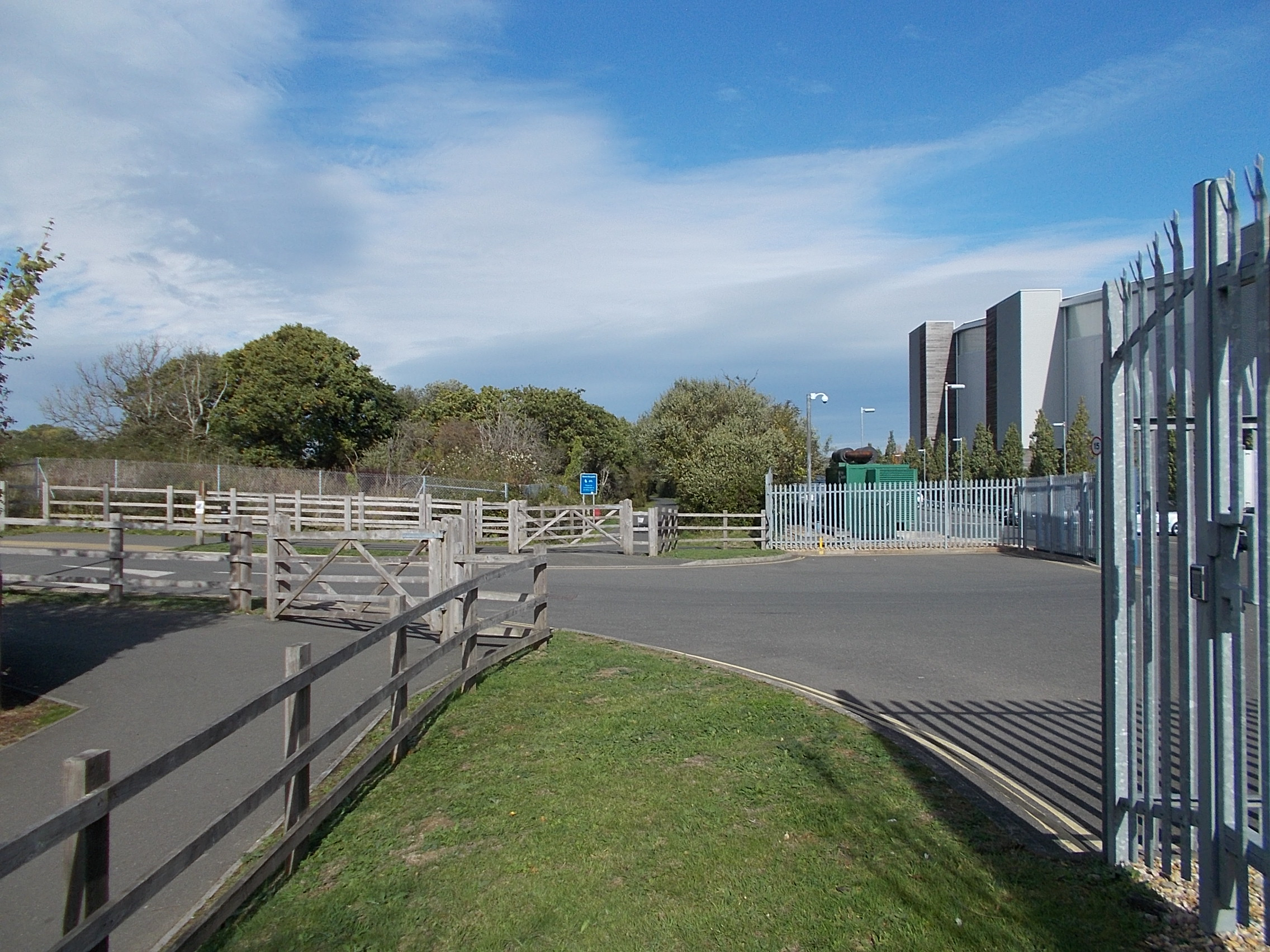
The site of the old halt in 2018, looking north along the old railway track, which is now a cycle path. The small platform was just beyond the far gate on the west side of the line, near to the blue sign. The old cement mills lay to the east of the line, now the site of the modern Vestas works, part of which is seen to the right of picture.

== See also ==
- List of closed railway stations in Britain

Preceding station	Disused railways	Following station
Newport	British Rail; Southern Region; IoW CR : Newport to Cowes line	Medina Wharf
