= Mill Hill station =

Mill Hill station may refer to:

== London ==
- Mill Hill (The Hale) railway station, a disused railway station
- Mill Hill Broadway railway station, opened as "Mill Hill"
- Mill Hill East tube station, opened as "Mill Hill"

== Other ==
- Mill Hill railway station (Lancashire)
- Mill Hill railway station (Isle of Wight)
- Mills Hill railway station

== See also ==
- Mills Hill railway station
