= Medina Wharf Halt railway station =

Former railway station in England

Coordinates: 50°44′48″N 1°17′38″W

Medina Wharf
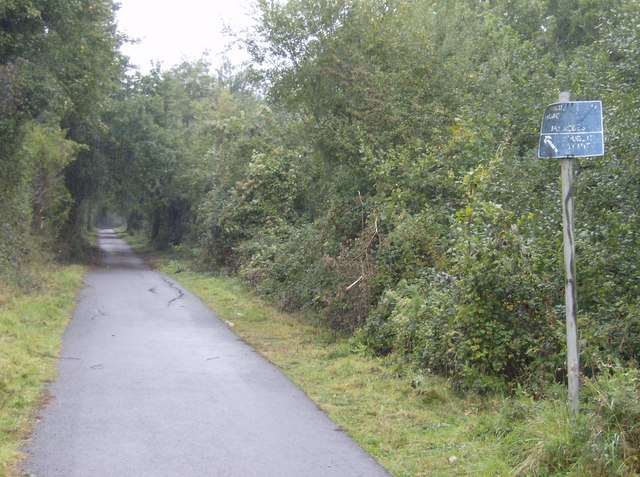
- A spot near the site of Medina Wharf Halt

General information
- Location: Inlet, River Medina, Isle of Wight; England
- Grid reference: SZ 499943
- Platforms: 1

Other information
- Status: Disused

History
- Pre-grouping: Isle of Wight Central Railway (1887 to 1923)
- Post-grouping: Southern Railway (1923 to 1948); Southern Region of British Railways (1948 to 1966)

Key dates
- 1896: Opened
- 21 February 1966: Closed
Location

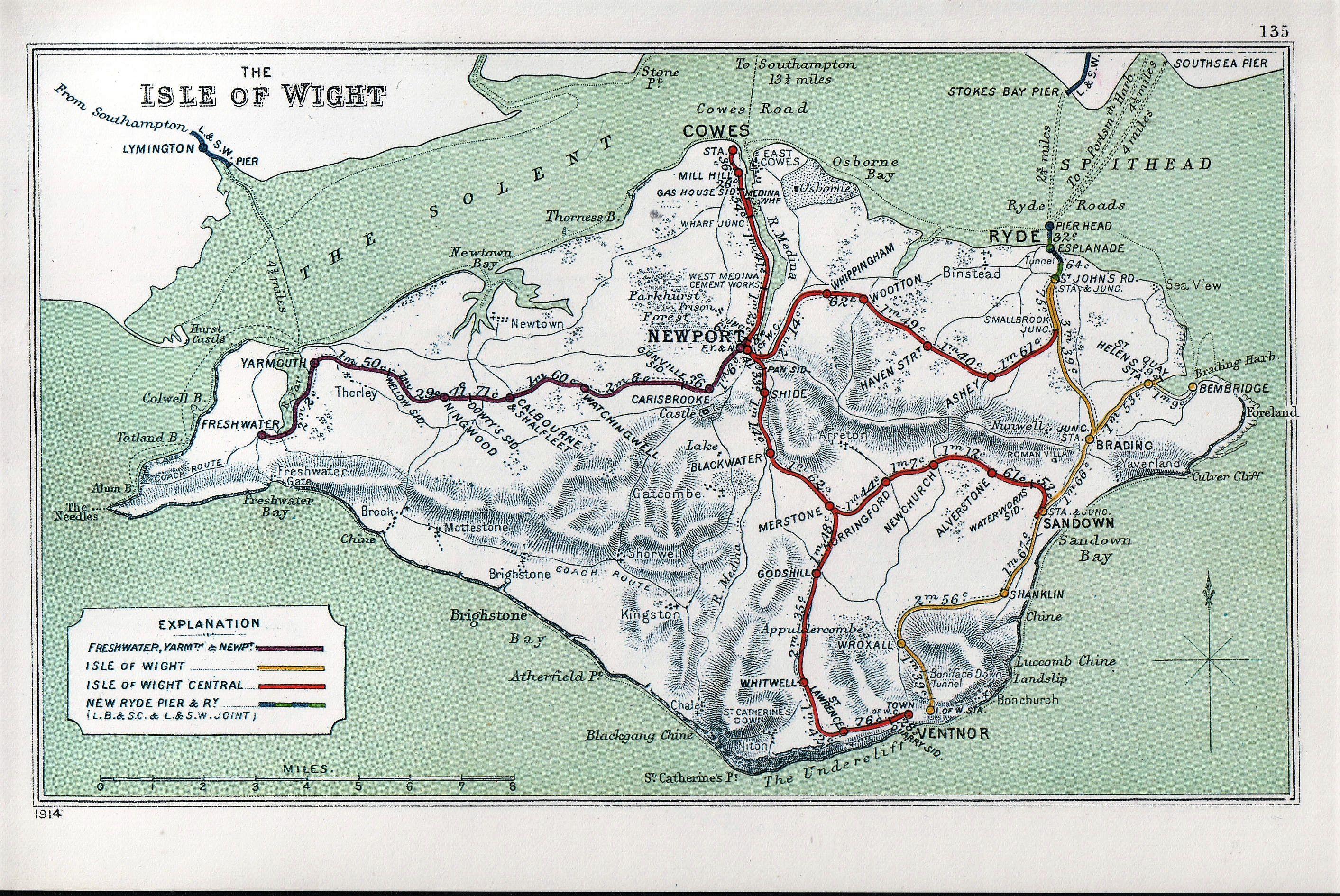
A 1914 Railway Clearing House map of lines around The Isle of Wight.

Medina Wharf Railway Station was a private halt between Cowes and Newport on the Isle of Wight that provided a way for workers at the nearby wharf to get to work before the road was laid. No shelter for its few passengers was ever provided and it never appeared on a public timetable. Additionally a non-passenger-carrying coal train transported coal from the siding via the halt to Ryde. After the Southern Railway took over from the IWCR the whole complex was extensively rebuilt.

After the closure of the passenger station in 1966, freight traffic continued for about a year following which the track was lifted in the early 1970s. The trackway is now part of NCN route 23.

Preceding station	Disused railways	Following station
Cement Mills Halt	British Rail; Southern Region; IoW CR : Newport to Cowes line	Mill Hill

== See also ==
- List of closed railway stations in Britain
