= Mill Hill railway station =

Mill Hill railway station may refer to the following stations in England:

== In use ==
- Mill Hill railway station (Lancashire)
- Mill Hill Broadway railway station, London
- Mill Hill East tube station, London

== Disused or demolished ==
- Mill Hill railway station (Isle of Wight)
- Mill Hill (The Hale) railway station, London

== See also ==
- Mills Hill railway station, Manchester
