= Havenstreet railway station =

Main station on the Isle of Wight Steam Railway

Havenstreet
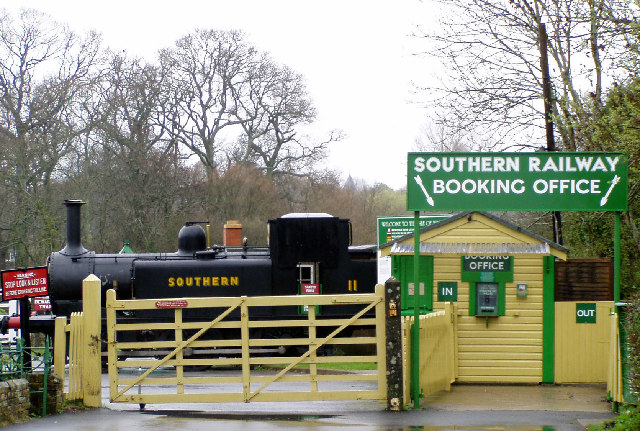

General information
- Location: East of Guildford Farm, near Havenstreet, Isle of Wight; England
- Coordinates: 50.70520°N 1.21541°W
- Grid reference: SZ555898
- System: Station on heritage railway
- Manager: Ryde and Newport Railway (1875 to 1887); Isle of Wight Central Railway (1887 to 1923); Southern Railway (1923 to 1948); Southern Region of British Railways (1948 to 1966); Isle of Wight Steam Railway (since 1971 )
- Platforms: 2

Key dates
- 1875: Opened (Haven Street)
- 1958: Renamed (Havenstreet)
- 21 February 1966: Closed
- 1971: Reopened
Location

Havenstreet railway station is a railway station at Havenstreet, Isle of Wight.

== History ==
It opened in 1875 and was an intermediate stop on (successively) the Ryde and Newport Railway, Isle of Wight Central Railway, Southern Railway and British Rail-being renamed Havenstreet in 1958. It closed on 21 February 1966 but re-opened as the headquarters of the Isle of Wight Steam Railway in 1971.

Developments since re-opening have included the construction of a locomotive works, carriage and wagon repair works, additional sidings and a café. Additionally, the former gasworks has been opened to the public as a shop and museum, the water tower formerly at Newport was re-erected at Havenstreet in 1971, and money is being raised for the construction of a carriage storage shed.

In September 2025 it was one of seven railway-associated buildings which were grade II listed in the week of the bicentenary of the Stockton and Darlington Railway. Historic England recognises it for its architectural and historic interest.

== Stationmasters ==
- Albert Gale ca. 1877
- Frederick Drudge ca. 1879–1881 (afterwards station master at Horringford)
- William Henry Strawn ca. 1881 ca. 1882 (formerly station master at Mill Hill, Cowes)
- George Fitzgibbon ca. 1899
- Frederick Deadman ca. 1910
- George Spinks ca. 1915
- Frederick G. Drew ca. 1935 (also station master at Ashey)

| Preceding station | Heritage railways | Following station |
|---|---|---|
| Wootton Terminus | Isle of Wight Steam Railway | Ashey towards Smallbrook Junction |

== Gallery ==
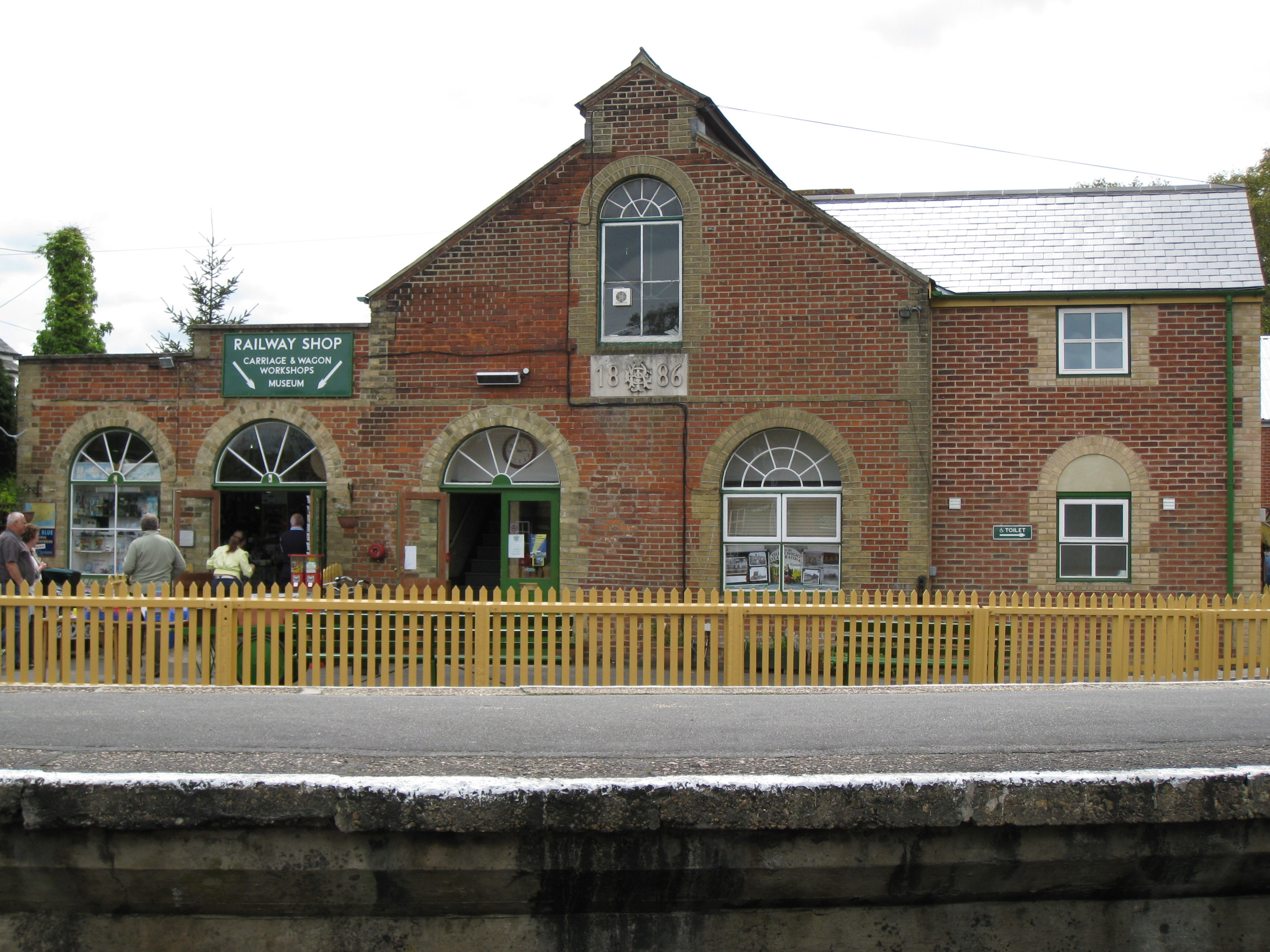
Havenstreet Station shop, workshops and museum

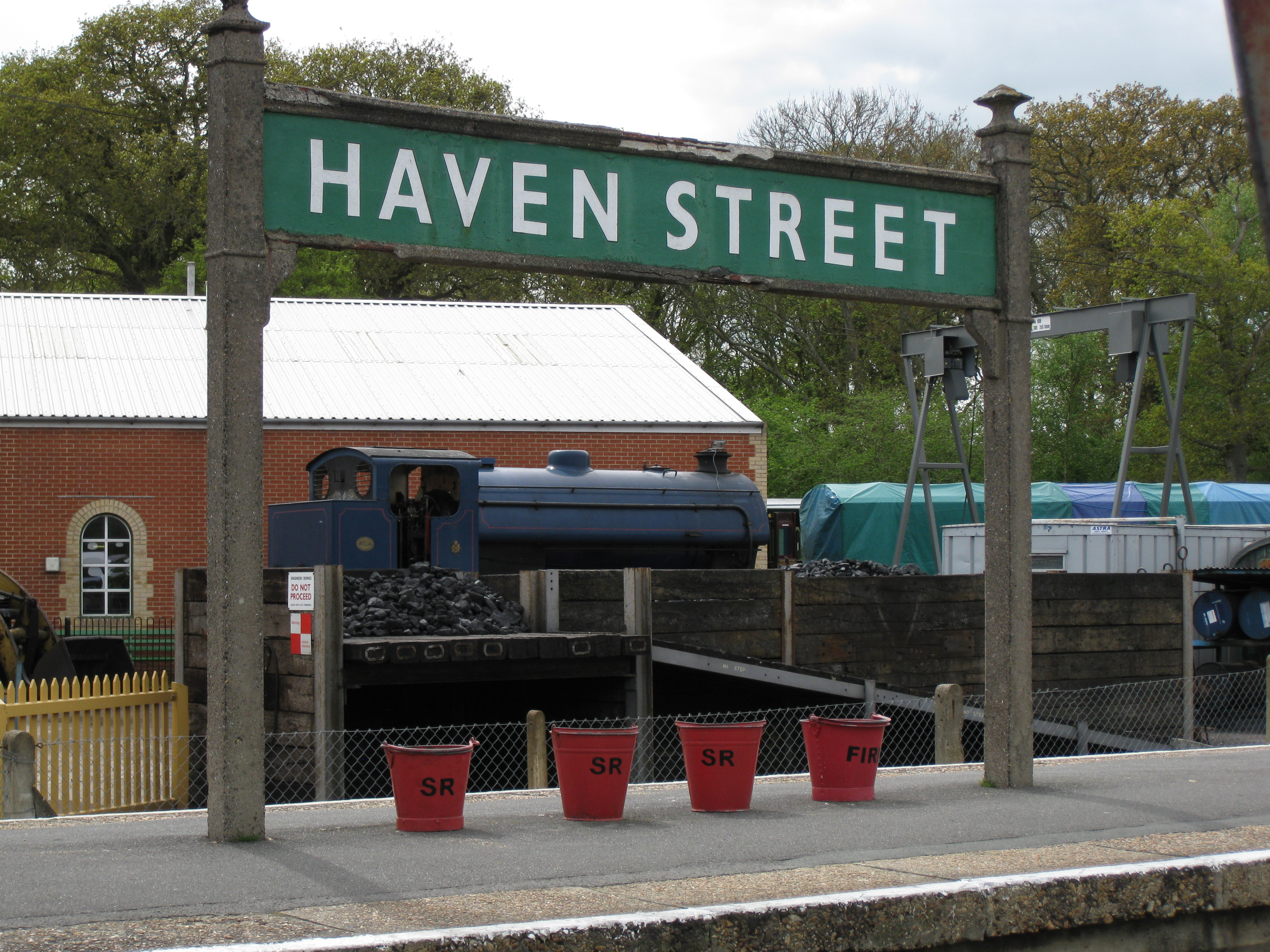
Havenstreet Station sign

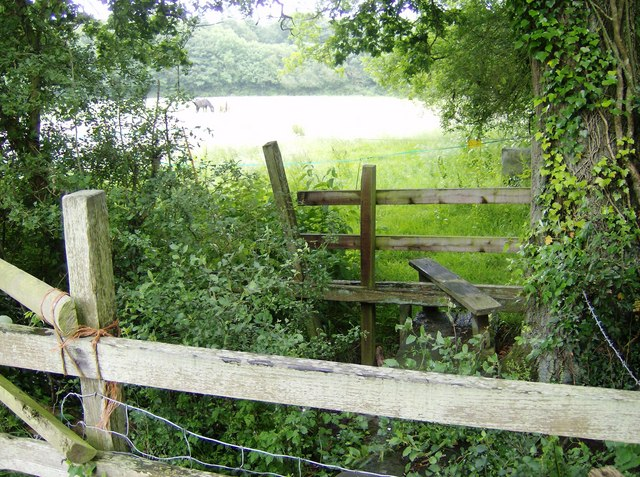
Approaching line from Guildford Farm

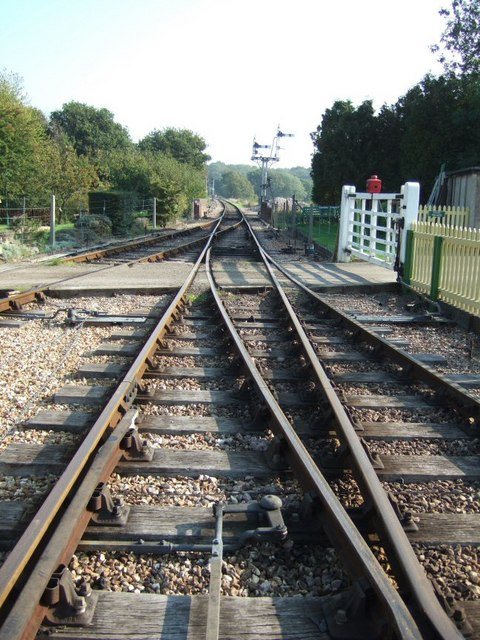
Line approaching Havenstreet from Ashey

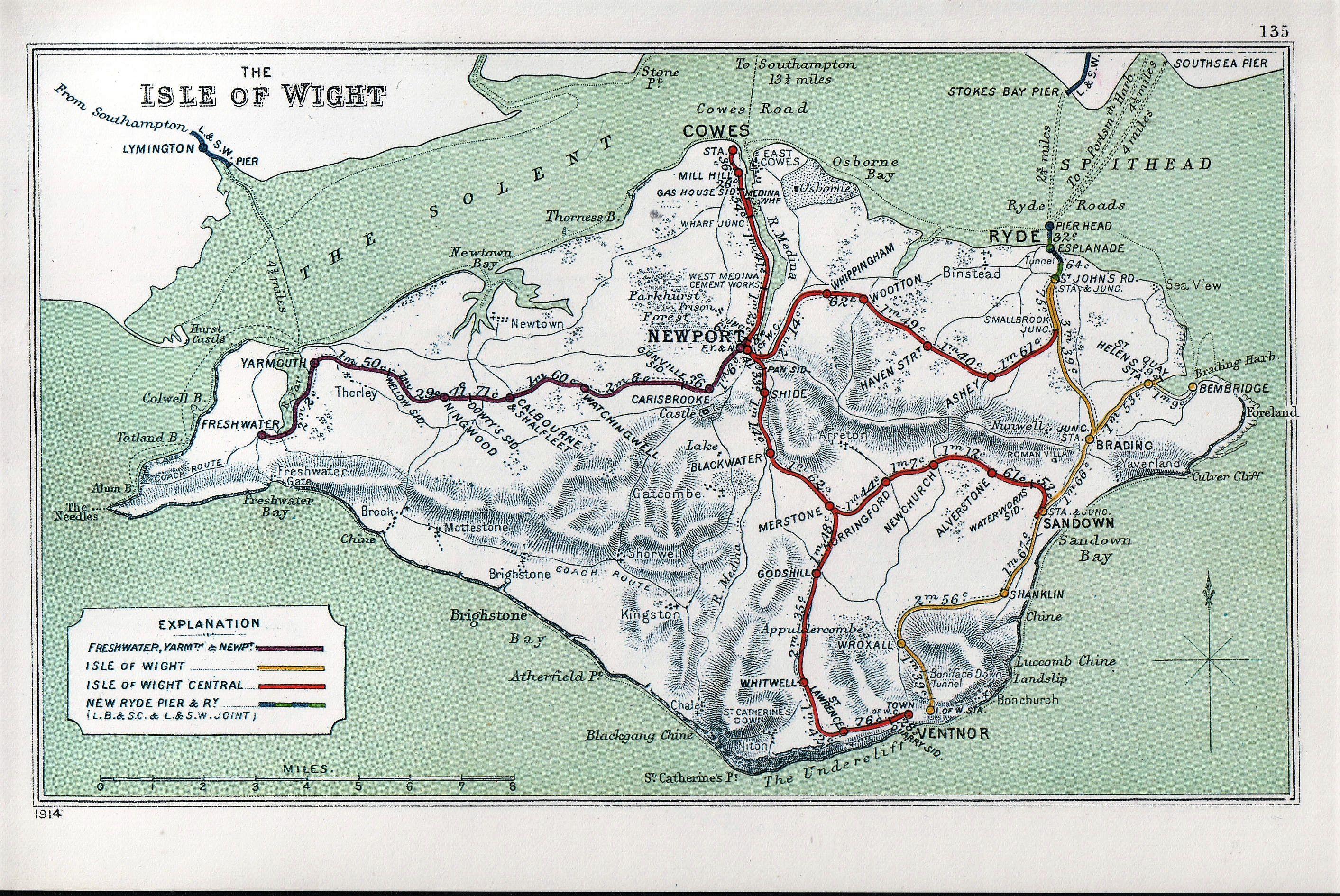
A 1914 Railway Clearing House map of lines around The Isle of Wight.
