= Shide railway station =

Former railway station in Isle of Wight, UK

Coordinates: 50°41′26″N 1°17′18″W

Shide
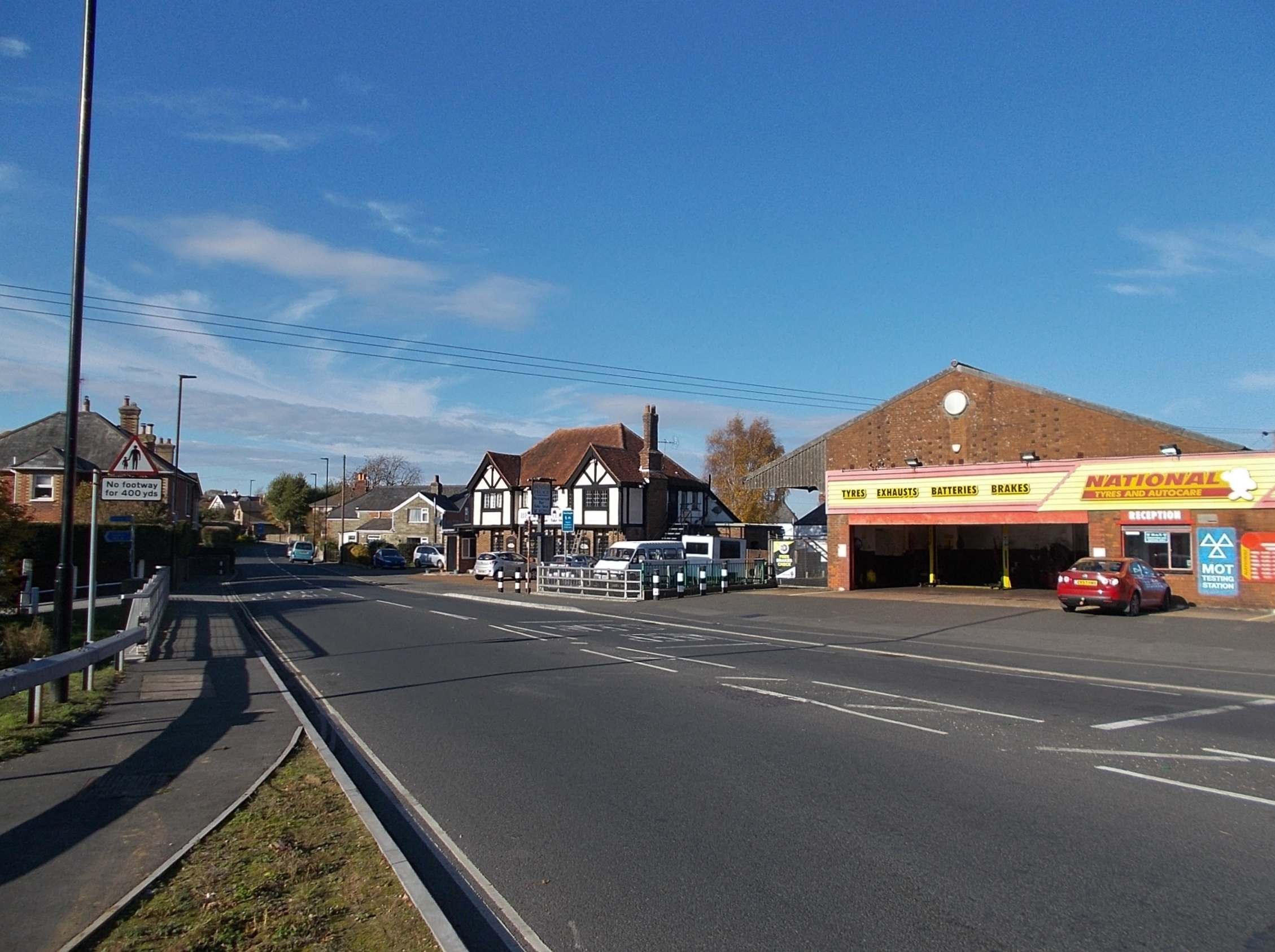
- Shide corner (2018); the station stood on the site of the tyre depot to the right

General information
- Location: Shide, Isle of Wight; England
- Grid reference: SZ504882
- Platforms: 1

Other information
- Status: Disused

History
- Original company: Isle of Wight (Newport Junction) Railway
- Pre-grouping: Isle of Wight Central Railway
- Post-grouping: Southern Railway

Key dates
- 1 February 1875: Opened
- 6 February 1956: Closed
Location

Shide railway station was at Shide, on the southern fringes of Newport, Isle of Wight, off the south coast of England. It was an intermediate station on the line from Newport to Sandown, which was initially operated by the Isle of Wight (Newport Junction) Railway (incorporated 1868).

== History ==
Shide station opened in 1875 and closed, along with the line itself, in 1956. Situated near Shide Chalk Pits, it was a sparsely used station whose main purpose was to transport raw materials needed for the Island’s cement industry. It was doomed when production ceased during the Second World War. The station site was built over and is now occupied by a warehouse, and the River Medina has since been diverted to flow along the course of the old railway at this point. The old track to the south of the station site is now a cycle route (NCN23).

== Stationmasters ==
- George Ranger ca. 1886
- Samuel John Urry ca. 1899 ca. 1901 (afterwards station master at Calbourne)
- George Hayward ca. 1915

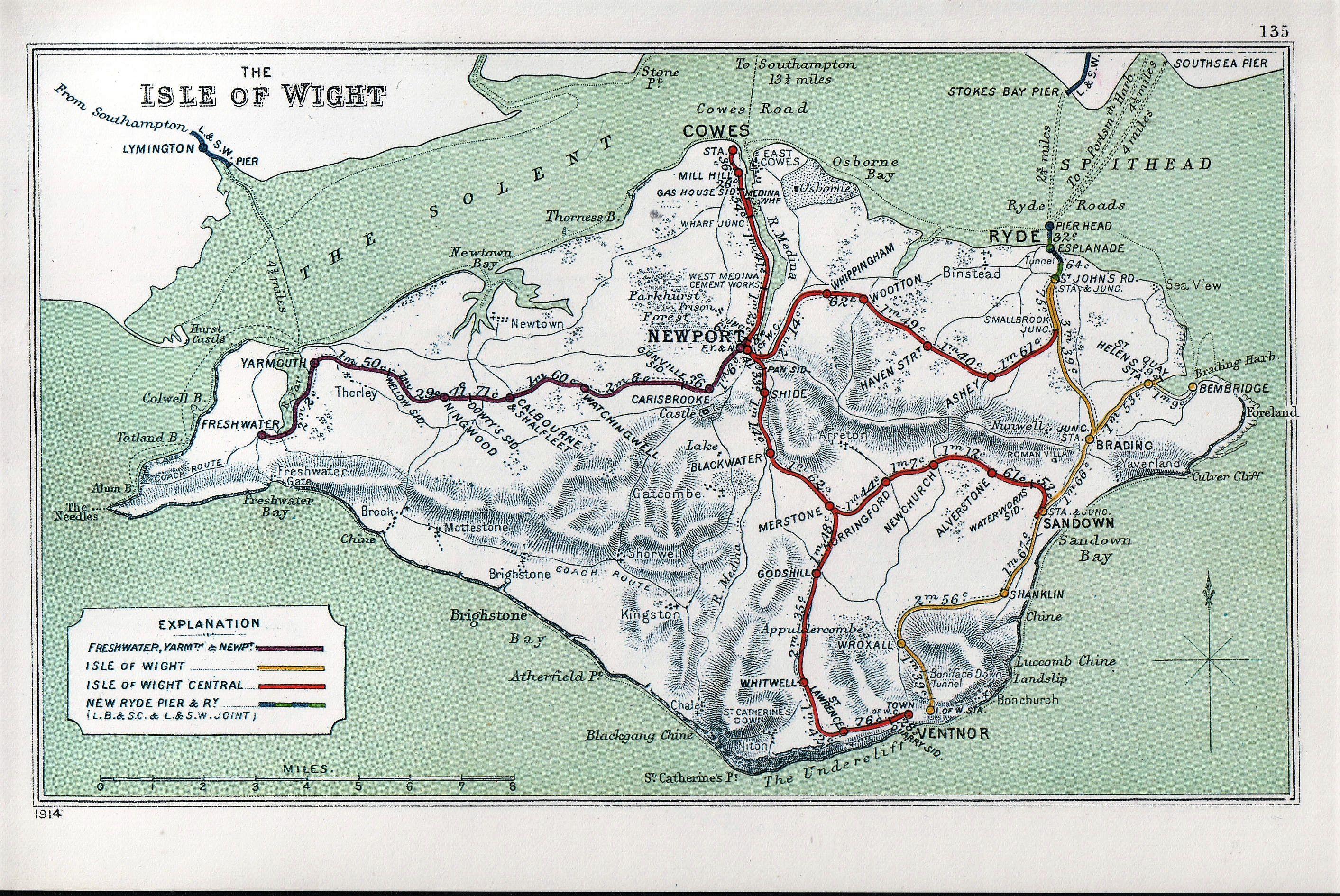
A 1914 Railway Clearing House map of lines around The Isle of Wight.

Preceding station	Disused railways	Following station
Blackwater	British Railways; Southern Region; IoW CR : Sandown to Newport line	Newport
Blackwater	Isle of Wight (Newport Junction) Railway (become part of IWCR in 1887)	Pan Lane

== See also ==
- List of closed railway stations in Britain
