= Isle of Wight Central Railway =

Railway in the UK

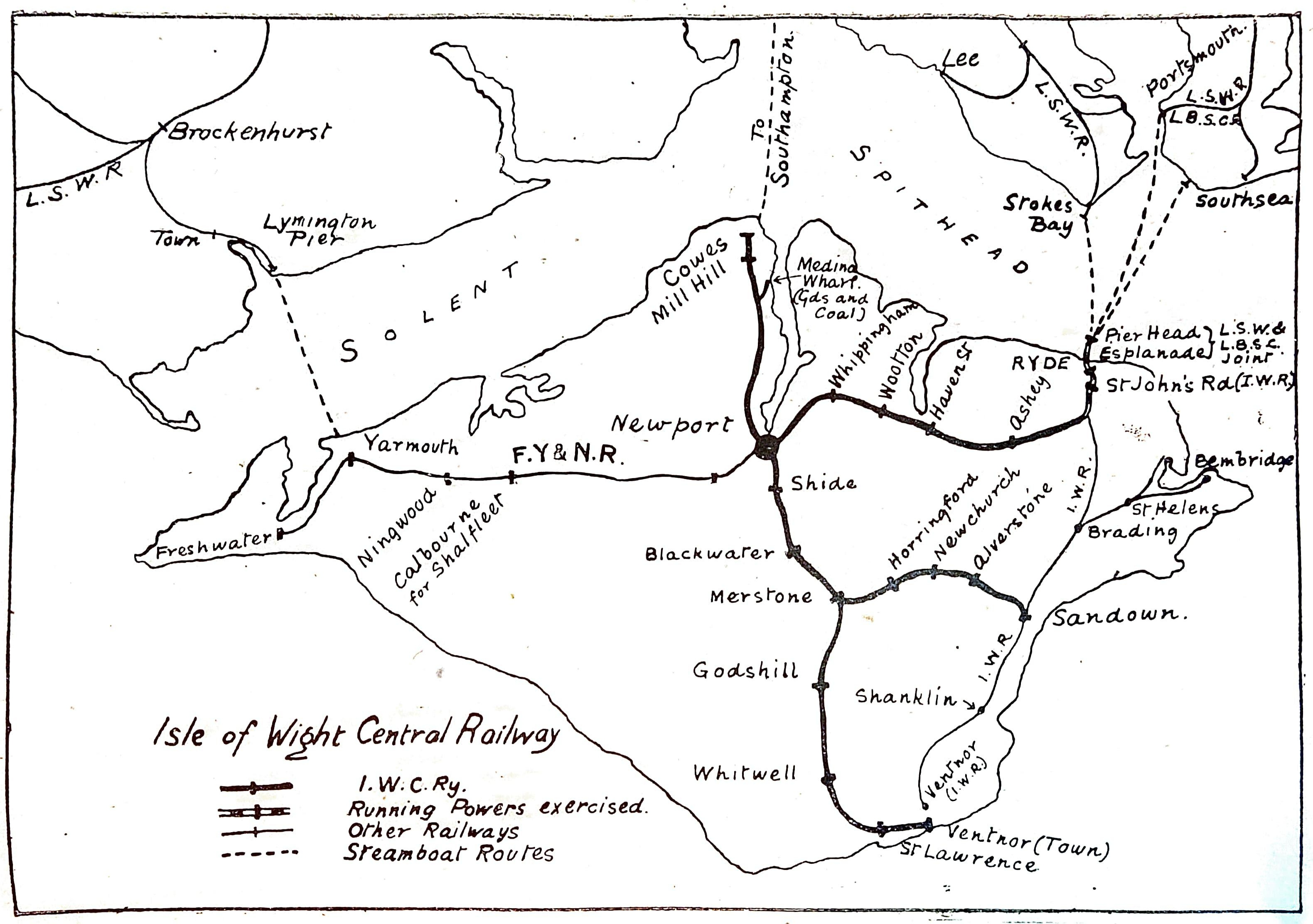
- 1920 map of the railway

Technical
- Track gauge: 4 ft 8 1/2 in (1,435 mm)
- Length: 28 miles 47 chains (46.0 km) (1919)
- Track length: 35 miles 24 chains (56.8 km) (1919)

The Isle of Wight Central Railway (IoWCR) was a railway company on the Isle of Wight, United Kingdom. It was formed in 1887 by the merging of three earlier railways, the Cowes and Newport Railway (opened 1862), the Ryde and Newport Railway (opened 1875) and the Isle of Wight (Newport Junction) Railway (opened in stages 1875 and 1879).

Its network ran from near Ryde to Cowes and from Sandown to Newport. It also worked the Freshwater, Yarmouth and Newport Railway until 1913, and in that year it purchased the Newport, Godshill and St. Lawrence Railway.

The IoWCR was always short of money, and operated with antiquated equipment. The heavily seasonal traffic and, later, competition from buses and cars limited profitable income.

In 1923, it was absorbed by the new Southern Railway, and the new owner put financial resources into worthwhile modernisation, but by the 1960s the financial situation became difficult and the whole of the former IoWCR network was closed in 1966. The Isle of Wight Steam Railway now operates on part of the line.

== First railways ==
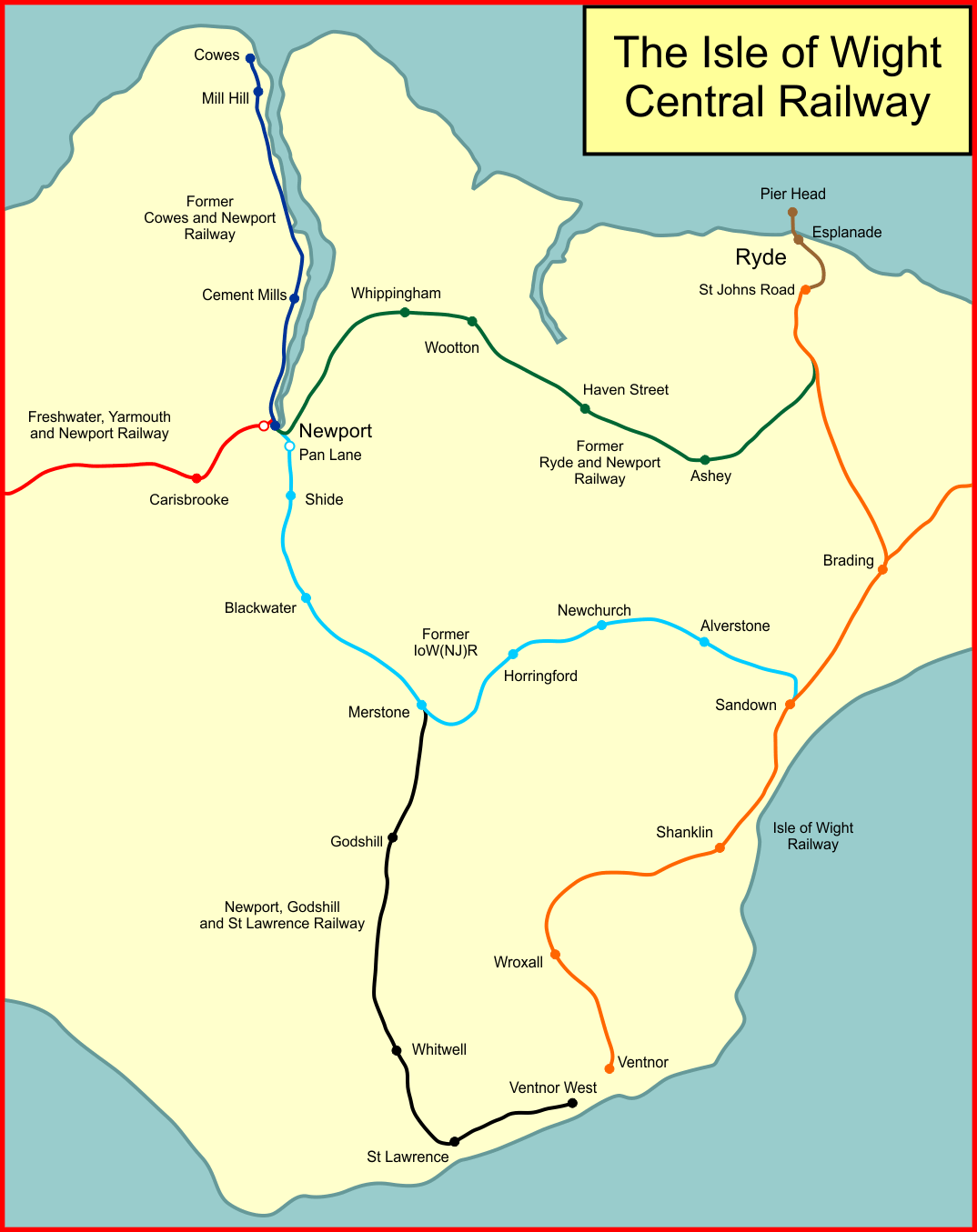
System map of the Isle of Wight Central Railway

Early in the nineteenth century, the Isle of Wight was chiefly involved in agriculture; there was industrial activity in Newport, and Ryde was an established town. Cowes and Ryde both had ferry services from the mainland, but Cowes, on the River Medina, was dominant because of the better harbour there.

During the railway mania of the 1840s, it was proposed that railways should be built on the island to develop tourism, which was then beginning to become an important economic activity, as well as to handle the agriculture and other produce of the island. A number of schemes were put forward but failed to gain support, until in 1858 bills for three railway projects were submitted to Parliament; they were:

- The Isle of Wight Railway (Eastern Section), intended to run from Ryde to Upper Bonchurch, with branches to Brading and Shanklin, and a tramway to Ryde Pier;
- The Isle of Wight Railway; to run from Cowes to Ryde via Newport, with branches to Ventnor and Ryde Pier;
- The Cowes and Newport Railway.

Cowes and Newport (Isle of Wight) Railway Act 1859
- Act of Parliament
- Parliament of the United Kingdom
- Long title: An Act for making a Railway from West Cowes to Newport in the Isle of Wight, and for other Purposes.
- Citation: 22 & 23 Vict. c. xciv

Dates
- Royal assent: 8 August 1859

The first two were rejected in the House of Lords' Committee, and only the Cowes and Newport Railway was authorised. (Note: In the authorising act of Parliament it was titled the Cowes and Newport (Isle of Wight) Railway.) The Cowes and Newport (Isle of Wight) Railway Act 1859 (22 & 23 Vict. c. xciv) obtained royal assent on 8 August 1859.

=== Cowes and Newport Railway ===
Cowes and Newport Railway Act 1863
- Act of Parliament
- Parliament of the United Kingdom
- Long title: An Act for authorizing the Cowes and Newport Railway Company to raise further Monies.
- Citation: 26 & 27 Vict. c. l

Dates
- Royal assent: 8 June 1863

Cowes and Newport Railway Act 1864
- Act of Parliament
- Parliament of the United Kingdom
- Long title: An Act for authorizing the Cowes and Newport Railway Company to make and maintain Extension and Branch Railways in the Isle of Wight, and to raise Funds for the Purpose; and for other Purposes.
- Citation: 27 & 28 Vict. c. lviii

Dates
- Royal assent: 23 June 1864

The Cowes and Newport Railway (C&NR) was to be 4 1/2 miles (7 km) in length, running north to south along the west side of the River Medina. The authorised share capital was £30,000 (equivalent to £3,260,000 in 2025).

A construction contract was let to Albert H. Fernandez, and the first sod was cut on 15 October 1859. The construction had been thought to be simple, but in fact the nature of the ground and the wet weather made the work extremely difficult. In December 1861, the contractor had to give up the work, and the company continued for a period managing the work directly. The C&NR itself had financial difficulties as the authorised share issue was considerably undersubscribed. The Cowes station abutted Cross Street, where there was a level crossing, over which the line continued as a tramway; engine run-round movements had to cross the level crossing and use the tramway, contrary to stipulations in the Cowes and Newport (Isle of Wight) Railway Act 1859. (The C&NR was later authorised to enlarge the station and close Cross Street. This work was done in early 1879).

Captain Tyler of the Board of Trade inspected the line for passenger operation in May 1862, but found numerous deficiencies and recommended that the authorisation for opening be declined. He returned on 14 June 1862 and this time everything was in order; the line opened on 16 June 1862; passenger traffic only was carried for some time after opening; there were eight trains each way on weekdays. Notice boards at the Newport station made it clear that onward conveyance to London, via Cowes and Southampton, was a primary objective.

The line was operated by a contractor, Henry Martin, for 50% of gross receipts at first, later 50% of net receipts.

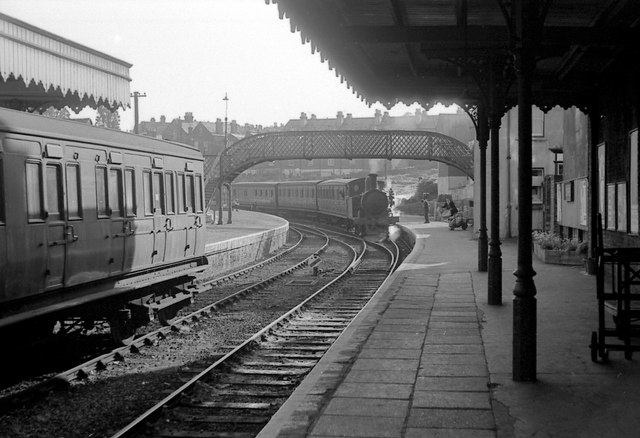
Cowes railway station in 1963

A wharf known as Medina Wharf was built adjoining the river between Cowes and Newport in 1877–78. Writing in 1962 Rickard said that the Medina Wharf was then the sole means of entry for coal to the island.

=== Isle of Wight Railway ===
The business interests on the east coast of the island continued to put forward a scheme based in Ryde. The Cowes and Newport Railway proposed an extension from Newport, Isle of Wight to Ryde and Ventnor, forming a large triangle, and to rename their company the Isle of Wight Railway. The promoters of the Isle of Wight (Eastern Section) Railway (IoW(ES)R) resubmitted their scheme too. The Cowes and Newport bill failed standing orders, and although there was some opposition to it, the IoW(ES)R was authorised by the Isle of Wight Eastern Section Railway Act 1860 (23 & 24 Vict. c. clxii) on 23 July 1860. In 1863, by the Isle of Wight Railway's (Extensions) Act 1863 (26 & 27 Vict. c. ccxxxii), it changed its name to the Isle of Wight Railway (IoWR); it opened between St John's Road station in Ryde and Shanklin on 23 August 1864 and on to Ventnor on 10 September 1866.

This had a significant effect in shifting the route for trade access to the island: in February 1868 the Cowes and Newport Railway directors reported that their company's earnings were static following the opening of the IoWR; travellers forsook the Southampton and Cowes route in favour of Portsmouth and Ryde. Cowes railway station was inconveniently up a steep hill from the ferry port.

=== Isle of Wight (Newport Junction) Railway ===
From 1861, the pace of proposing further railways on the island accelerated. Some accepted that only one further line was commercially viable, but there was little agreement about its possible course. Nonetheless, connecting Newport to the east coast was considered an important objective.

Isle of Wight (Newport Junction) Railway Act 1868
- Act of Parliament
- Parliament of the United Kingdom
- Long title: An Act for making Railways in the Isle of Wight to connect Newport and Cowes with Sandown, Ryde, and Ventnor.
- Citation: 31 & 32 Vict. c. clxxxi

Dates
- Royal assent: 31 July 1868

In 1868, three bills came to Parliament; they were considered to be mutually exclusive, and over a very lengthy hearing evidence was given in favour of each, and against its presumed competitors. The dominance of the Portsmouth–Ryde ferry route had not yet been established, and in any case Cowes was assumed to be the port of entry for goods and minerals. (Note: Some inward minerals and heavy goods were landed on the beach at Ryde.) The Isle of Wight (Newport Junction) Railway Act 1868 (31 & 32 Vict. c. clxxxi) was given royal assent on 31 July 1868, to build a line from Newport to the Sandown station of the Isle of Wight Railway.

The competing proposals were rejected; those who favoured a line from Newport to Ryde were disappointed, and continued the struggle.

==== Building the Isle of Wight (Newport Junction) Railway ====
The authorised capital of the Newport Junction line was £84,000, but it was not planned to pass through any major population centre that was not already rail-connected, and the company found it difficult to raise the money it needed for construction. Moreover, successive resignations of directors made continuity of progress difficult. The first sod was finally cut at Shide on 14 October 1870. Early in 1871, a prospectus was published offering preference shares, although the company was not authorised to issue these, and this was soon followed by acrimonious and public name-calling between the company and the Corporation of Newport.

In 1872, the line between Sandown and Horringford was thought to be ready for opening, and on 20 June Colonel Yolland of the Board of Trade visited the line to carry out the inspection for passenger operation; as well as finding a considerable number of detail shortcomings, he was very critical of the rails. There were second-hand double-headed rails (Note: Double-headed rails were rails of cross-section similar to bullhead rails, intended to be inverted when the original upper surface became worn.) formerly in use on the London and South Western Railway. They had been inverted on the LSWR line, using the second running table. The rails were badly galled by the chairs and there were splits and bulges in the head. They had been cropped to 16 feet (5 m), and the head wear was not matched, so that the joints were uneven. The fishplate bolts were not long enough in many cases.

Approval to open the line to passenger traffic was refused; the company tried to appeal against this, but failed; subsequent inspection visits took place on 31 July, 28 August and 26 September 1872, without success. Creditors demanded payment, and one unfortunate contractor went into bankruptcy, having accepted the company's shares in payment: those shares were now worthless. In December 1872 it was calculated that the company had expended £77,490 and had nothing to show for it; and the line was now estimated to require £90,548 to complete.

Isle of Wight (Newport Junction) Railway Act 1872
- Act of Parliament
- Parliament of the United Kingdom
- Long title: An Act to enable the Isle of Wight (Newport Junction) Railway Company to extend their Line to join the authorised Line of the Yarmouth and Ventnor Railway, Tramway, and Pier Company; to authorise the construction of certain other new Railways and Works; revival of Powers; additional Capital; and for other purposes.
- Citation: 35 & 36 Vict. c. clxix

Dates
- Royal assent: 6 August 1872

Text of statute as originally enacted

Isle of Wight (Newport Junction) Railway Act 1878
- Act of Parliament
- Parliament of the United Kingdom
- Long title: An Act for reviving the powers and extending the time for the completion of a portion of the Railway and Works authorised by the Isle of Wight (Newport Junction) Railway Act, 1872; and for other purposes.
- Citation: 41 & 42 Vict. c. xxviii

Dates
- Royal assent: 16 April 1878

Text of statute as originally enacted

Against this background the Isle of Wight (Newport Junction) Railway (IoW(NJ)R) had obtained a further act of Parliament, the Isle of Wight (Newport Junction) Railway Act 1872 (35 & 36 Vict. c. clxix), in August 1872, authorising additional capital as well as certain deviations and extensions. Somehow work proceeded, and in July 1874 Colonel Rich of the Board of Trade visited the Sandown to Horringford line; the bad rails seem to have been changed but Rich again refused sanction to open the line due to other faults. Further attention was given and in January 1875 Colonel Rich inspected the line from Sandown to Shide and found it satisfactory,

The company opened its line on 1 February 1875; in public announcements the company referred to the Shide station as "Newport". The company started running passenger trains on to Pan Lane at Newport, from 11 August 1875, but this was without permission from the Board of Trade: in effect illegally; Colonel Hutchinson visited for the necessary inspection on 6 October 1875, and on the company promising to rectify a number of issues, the running to Pan Lane continued. (The company sometimes used Pan Mill as the station name at first.) There were nine trains each way on weekdays.

=== Ryde and Newport Railway ===
Ryde and Newport Railway Act 1872
- Act of Parliament
- Parliament of the United Kingdom
- Long title: An Act to incorporate a Company for making "The Ryde and Newport Railway;" and for other purposes.
- Citation: 35 & 36 Vict. c. cxxxv

Dates
- Royal assent: 25 July 1872

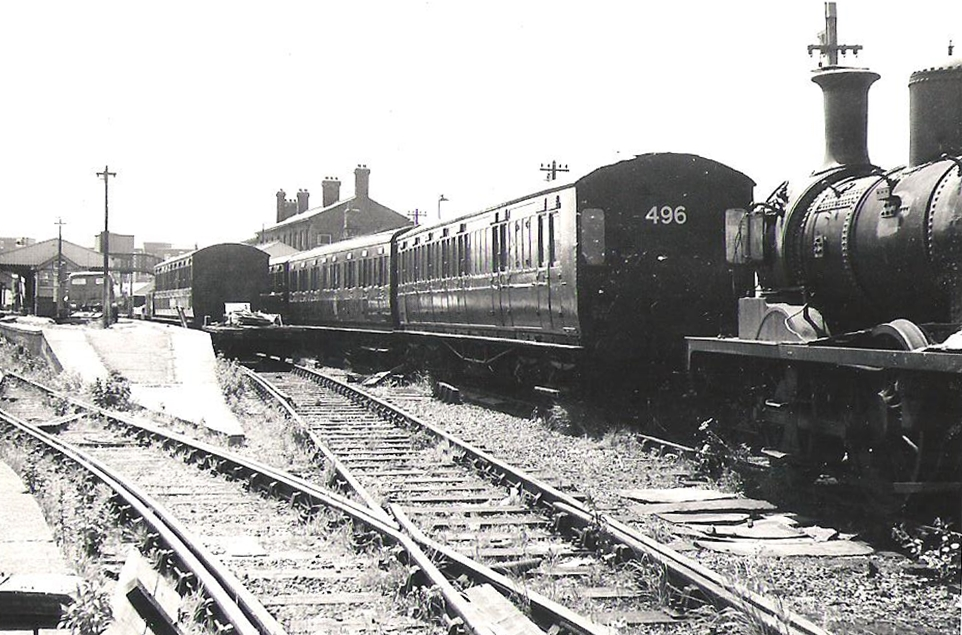
Newport station after closure

The operation of the Isle of Wight Railway enhanced the importance of Ryde as the port of entry to the island, and it soon became more important than Cowes, particularly for passengers. 300,000 people travelled between Newport and Ryde annually, and the road coaches were not convenient. The necessity of connecting Newport revived the idea of a railway between them, and on 25 July 1872 the Ryde and Newport Railway (R&NR) was authorised by an act of Parliament, the Ryde and Newport Railway Act 1872 (35 & 36 Vict. c. cxxxv). The share capital was £65,000.

The Isle of Wight Railway (IoWR) agreed to the R&NR using its line to get access to Ryde, and to its station there, in exchange for running powers for the IoWR between Ryde and Newport. (Note: The running powers were never used for ordinary traffic, but the IoWR ran trains to Ashey on certain race days.)

A contract for the construction was awarded to Barnett and Gale on 1 October 1872. Instead of building its own line into Ryde, it arranged with the Isle of Wight Railway to join it at Smallbrook, a little over one mile (1.6 km) south of St John's Road; IoWCR trains were to run to Ryde on track provided by the IoWR.

A temporary connection was laid in at Smallbrook to assist in the delivery of materials for construction purposes. Work continued rapidly, but early in 1874 Barnett and Gale got into financial difficulties, and the contract was transferred to J & G Taylor. The construction and land acquisition expended much of the company's available cash, and a director, George Young, personally made money available to continue. In 1875, the railway company obtained authorisation to raise additional share capital (in fact, the £30,000 of preference shares could only be sold at a 30% discount).

The original Cowes and Newport Railway station at Newport had been a very basic construction, and it had always been the intention to construct a new station for the use of the C&NR, the R&NR and the IoW(NJ)R; this involved agreeing on the crossing of the Medina at Newport with the borough corporation, and apportioning the costs. This took some time and the bridge, to be a swing bridge, was agreed in January 1875. By this time the line had been completed to the end of the bridge location. When completed, the bridge was operated manually by windlass; the two tracks could be opened individually and there was a long approach viaduct.

The IoWR laid a second track alongside its own from Smallbrook to Ryde. There was to be no operational junction at this stage, and the two companies each were to work over one of the two single lines.

Lt Colonel Hutchinson visited the IoWCR in November 1875, but refused to sanction the opening of the line to passenger traffic as the station accommodation, in particular, was incomplete. On 17 December he visited again, and although some matters were imperfect, the desired sanction for opening was given.

The Ryde and Newport Railway opened on 20 December 1875, and like the Cowes and Newport it ran seven passenger trains each way on weekdays. The intermediate stations probably did not open until March 1876.

Ryde and Newport and Cowes and Newport Railways Act 1875
- Act of Parliament
- Parliament of the United Kingdom
- Long title: An Act to authorise the raising of new capital by the Ryde and Newport Railway Company and the Cowes and Newport Railway Company; and for other purposes.
- Citation: 38 & 39 Vict. c. lx

Dates
- Royal assent: 14 June 1875

Text of statute as originally enacted

Ryde and Newport Railway Act 1877
- Act of Parliament
- Parliament of the United Kingdom
- Long title: An Act for confirming an agreement between the Ryde and Newport and the Cowes and Newport Railway Companies, for the enlargement of the Cowes Station and the extension of the Cowes and Newport Railway at Cowes, for improving the Approaches to the Joint Station at Newport, for making a Railway or Siding in the parish of Northwood, with a Landing-stage on the River Medina; and for other purposes relating to the Ryde and Newport and Cowes and Newport Railway Companies and their respective undertakings.
- Citation: 40 & 41 Vict. c. lxxxviii

Dates
- Royal assent: 12 July 1877

Text of statute as originally enacted

The R&NR paid the IoWR a rental for the use of the Ryde station. The R&NR arranged with the Cowes and Newport Railway for their two lines to be worked jointly, an arrangement that was ratified by Parliament in the Ryde and Newport and Cowes and Newport Railways Act 1875 (38 & 39 Vict. c. lx), which also authorised the R&NR to build Medina wharf on the River Medina. The wharf was much more suitable for handling heavy goods and minerals, and it quickly became the chief port of entry to the island for that traffic.

==== Ashey racecourse ====
There was a racecourse adjacent to the line at Ashey, and excursion trains to the race meetings were popular. The Isle of Wight Railway had running powers to Newport and exercised them for the purpose of running to Ashey on race days.

A southwards tramway ran from the station to a chalk pit, running closely past the track and the grandstand. Some authorities state that there was an Ashey Racecourse station, used only for race meetings, on the tramway, in use from April 1882 to about 1930. It seems likely that this is a mistake: the empty rolling stock for the excursions was stabled on the tramway during the racing, but there was no passenger station. The tramway is clearly shown on the mapping of the period, but no station is marked on any Ordnance Survey map in the relevant period. Writing in 1946, Jones describes the route from Newport to Ryde and states

Another climb... brings the line to Ashey station, with its disused passing loop. Many years ago there was a racecourse nearby, and the extra traffic on race days was accommodated on the loop, and also on a siding which ran to a worked-out chalk pit in Ashey Down. In the late 1920s the grandstands of the racecourse were destroyed by fire, and since then it has fallen into disuse.

== Collaborative working, but disputes over costs ==
The R&NR and the C&NR had always intended to operate collaboratively, and on 1 July 1876 the Ryde, Newport and Cowes Joint Committee was established to manage operational matters. This was successful so far as day-to-day running was concerned, but the difficult financial situation of the companies led to continuing failure to work together over completion of the line.

The R&NR was still heavily indebted and was struggling to pay off the outstanding sums. The IoW(NJ)R too needed some time to increase its income, although on 28 June 1876, the anniversary of the coronation of Queen Victoria, thirteen-coach trains were run between Sandown and Newport; rolling stock had to be hired in from the IoWR. Cheaply-constructed wooden platforms were opened at Alverstone, Newchurch, Merstone and Blackwater, probably just in time for Coronation Day 1876.

A vexatious dispute arose over the apportionment of contributions to the cost of the Newport viaduct and bridge, and resort to arbitration, and the need for the Ryde and Newport Railway Act 1877 (38 & 39 Vict. c. lx) to be passed to revive expired powers all delayed opening. An inspection by Major General Hutchinson in October 1878 resulted in the design strength of the bridge girders being questioned.

This seems to have been resolved and in March 1879 he approved the bridge but objected to the junction connection between the two railways' lines. On 1 May 1879, the directors reported at a shareholders' meeting that the junction had been made and used for goods trains, and it seems to have been opened for all traffic on 1 June 1879.

Meanwhile, relations with the IoWR, which had been working the IoW(NJ)R, broke down completely, and that arrangement was terminated at the beginning of 1879. The IoW(NJ)R was steadily descending into heavy indebtedness, with many landowners still waiting for their money, and debenture interest payments being left unpaid, and important track improvements being left undone. Against this background the joint committee took over the working of the IoW(NJ)R on 1 April 1879.

=== Extension to Ryde Pier ===
The IoWCR ran over the IoWR into Ryde; the station was at St John's Road and the distance from there to Ryde Pier was a serious inconvenience to through passengers to Portsmouth on the mainland. The London, Brighton and South Coast Railway and the London and South Western Railway together decided to build the missing link, and the line from Ryde Pier Head to the IoWR's St John's Road station opened on 12 July 1880. At first there was limited accommodation at Ryde so the Newport trains were not admitted to the extension until October 1880.

== Amalgamation as the Isle of Wight Central Railway ==
Isle of Wight Central Railway Act 1887
- Act of Parliament
- Parliament of the United Kingdom
- Long title: An Act to amalgamate the undertakings of the Cowes and Newport the Isle of Wight (Newport Junction) and the Ryde and Newport Railway Companies; and for other purposes.
- Citation: 50 & 51 Vict. c. cxvi

Dates
- Royal assent: 19 July 1887
- Commencement: 1 July 1887

Text of statute as originally enacted

Isle of Wight Central Railway Act 1890
- Act of Parliament
- Parliament of the United Kingdom
- Long title: An Act to confer further powers on the Isle of Wight Central Railway Company; and for other purposes.
- Citation: 53 & 54 Vict. c. lxxiii

Dates
- Royal assent: 4 July 1890

Isle of Wight Central Railway Act 1902
- Act of Parliament
- Parliament of the United Kingdom
- Long title: An Act for empowering the Isle of Wight Central Railway Company to raise further moneys.
- Citation: 2 Edw. 7. c. xxvi

Dates
- Royal assent: 28 April 1902

The three central lines, the Cowes and Newport Railway, the Isle of Wight (Newport Junction) Railway and the Ryde and Newport Railway, were all in financial difficulties, but they had common cause. By common consent there were too many companies running the limited extent of the network, and they agreed on amalgamation as a way forward, and a combined company called the Isle of Wight Central Railway was authorised by the Isle of Wight Central Railway Act 1887 (50 & 51 Vict. c. cxvi) on 19 July 1887, retrospectively applicable from 1 July 1887.

The combined company was of course no better resourced financially than the three smaller companies. Charles Conacher, its General Manager, wrote that it

was over-capitalised, in order to pay off the arrears of interest and otherwise provide for the indebtedness of the amalgamated companies. This was apparently done by money borrowed at what is now the high rate of 4 1/2 per cent., and the Company has now been so engaged in meeting their fixed charges, amounting to about £13,000, out of a gross annual income of £30,000, as to leave nothing for dividend on Preference and Ordinary capital.

No extensions of the small network were planned. In fact, the IoWCR did not pay a dividend until 1913, and after that only on first preference shares.

The IoWCR was impecunious throughout its existence, and the generally improving expectations of society: interlocking, the block system and continuous brakes, workmen's compensation, and improvements to working hours, coupled with the need to replace worn-out track and to repair bridges, all combined to ensure that the company never managed to escape from this plight.

== Later development ==
=== Freshwater, Yarmouth and Newport Railway ===
The western part of the island remained untouched by railways, but Yarmouth was a ferry terminal, with the ferry to Lymington operated by the London and South Western Railway (LSWR). The LSWR encouraged the formation of a scheme for a railway that became the Freshwater, Yarmouth and Newport Railway (FY&NR), authorised by the Freshwater, Yarmouth and Newport Railway Act 1880 (43 & 44 Vict. c. clxxxvi) on 26 August 1880. It opened for goods traffic on 10 September 1888, and for passengers on 20 July 1889. There were eleven passenger trains each way on weekdays. The new line joined the IoWCR at Newport, but the layout at the junction did not enable FY&NR trains to run into the station directly; they were not permitted to propel to and from the station, so that they had to run around their train in both directions. The line was worked by the IoWCR.

=== Newport, Godshill and St Lawrence Railway ===
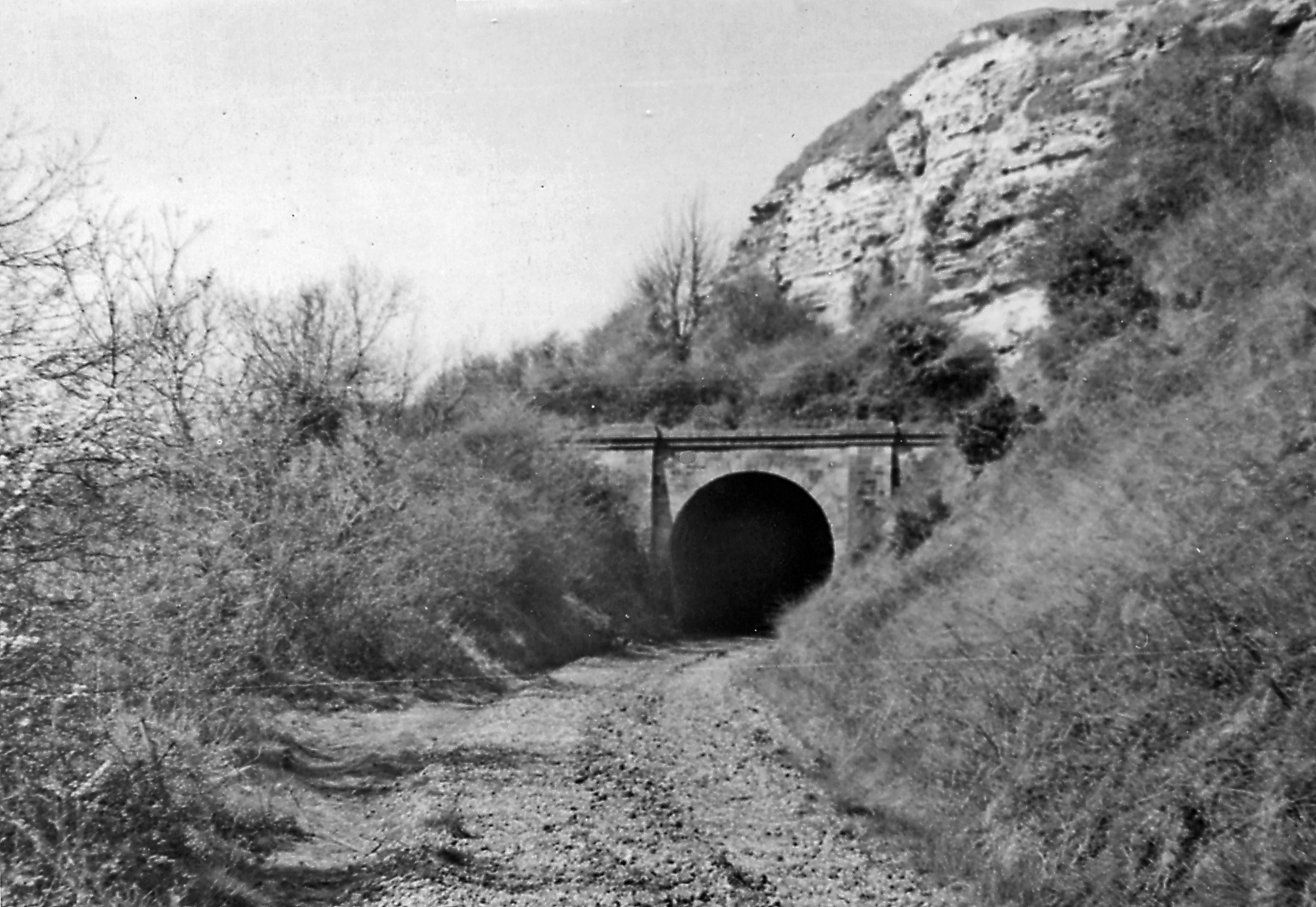
St Lawrence Tunnel after closure

Notwithstanding the existence of the route through Sandown, the member companies of the IoWCR had long felt that a direct line from Cowes or Newport to Ventnor, independent of the IoWR, was desirable, and a number of schemes had been proposed.

In 1889, one of these schemes was authorised: the Newport, Godshill and St Lawrence Railway got its act of Parliament, the Newport, Godshill and St. Lawrence Railway Act 1889 (55 & 56 Vict. c. ccxl) on 12 August. Long comments that constructing it was "probably the greatest economic folly of the Isle of Wight's railway network". The IoWCR was to work the line for 55% of gross receipts. It would leave the IoWCR Sandown line at Merstone, and follow a southerly course from there. This act was followed by a second act of Parliament, the Newport, Godshill and St. Lawrence Railway Act 1892 (55 & 56 Vict. c. ccxl), authorising an extension to Ventnor West. However the location available for the terminus there was, like the IoWR's own Ventnor station, somewhat inconvenient. It proved very difficult to persuade investors to subscribe in the railway, with corresponding shortages of cash for construction; there were also solvency problems for the contractor.

Eventually the section from Merstone to St Lawrence was ready and the Board of Trade inspector was critical of the tunnel, but sanctioned opening. There was a publicity demonstration run on 17 July 1897 and a public ceremonial opening on 19 July 1897, with normal public opening the following day. There were nine trains daily each way, and the line was worked by the IoWCR. The terminus was described as Ventnor (St Lawrence), although the station was two miles (3 km) from the town. F. Baker of Ventnor operated a horse omnibus over the distance, for a fare of sixpence.

Although the original contractor had failed financially, it proved possible to continue the extension to Ventnor, and Lt Colonel von Donop visited on 21 May 1900. Although there were some deficiencies he authorised the opening of the extension. A press run took place on 31 May 1900 and public services started on 1 June 1900. The Ventnor station was described as Ventnor Town, and it was stated that "In eight or nine minutes passengers can walk to the centre of the town."

There were now five trains each way daily, generally running through to Cowes trains on the Sandown former main line now made a connectional stop only at Merstone—and offering onward ferry connections via Southampton. From June 1901, it was arranged that the London and South Western Railway would run a train from London Waterloo to Southampton Royal Pier, making a swift connection to a ferry to Cowes and thence to Ventnor by train. This did not prove the commercial success that had been hoped. The preference of the Ventnor line over the Sandown line for the through trains was considered to be a mistake, and from 1 October 1903 the arrangement was reversed.

==== Bus competition ====
In 1905, the first motor bus service started work on the island. The primitive vehicles and poor roads of the day did not make for efficient travel, but the future threat was there. The IoWCR considered the adoption of railmotors—single-coach rail vehicles incorporating a small locomotive within the coach chassis. These vehicles offered lower operating costs, but still required a crew of three; and they did not have the power to haul additional vehicles at busy times. However they avoided the necessity of running round at the end of journeys. One was ordered from Hurst Nelson in October 1905. It was delivered a year later, on 4 October 1906. It went into service on the Ventnor line, but there were a succession of technical problems.

=== IoWCR finances ===
When the IoWCR agreed to work the Newport, Godshill and St Lawrence Railway, it guaranteed a minimum income of £2,000 to that company's shareholders. It anticipated that ordinary income would pay that sum off but the poor custom on the line failed to achieve that. The IoWCR preference shareholders were not getting dividends—the ordinary shareholders had no hope of that—and there was shareholder criticism of the payments. The issue came to a head at the shareholders' meeting of 1 March 1911, and several directors resigned, with new replacements then installed. One of the new men was Harry Willmott, who had long experience as a senior railway manager, including much in reviving the fortunes of the impecunious Stratford-upon-Avon and Midland Junction Railway. He was installed as the new chairman, and he soon brought in new managers and introduced more streamlined systems in the company. Incidentally, he negotiated with the Board of Trade about 1912 that Freshwater trains could be propelled to and from Newport station, overturning the old prohibition which required running around on every trip.

The guarantee to the NG&StLR remained a difficulty, and could hardly be negotiated away. The solution arrived at was the purchase of that company by the IoWCR. The Isle of Wight Central Railway (Godshill Transfer) Act 1913 (3 & 4 Geo. 5. c. xiii) of 4 July 1913 authorised the change, and it became effective on 1 October 1913. Godshill ordinary shareholders got fivepence in the pound (just over 2%); their railway had cost more than £250,000 to construct.

=== Freshwater, Yarmouth and Newport Railway working its own line ===
The Freshwater, Yarmouth and Newport Railway (FY&NR) had long been worked by the IoWCR. In 1910, the agreement needed to be renewed, and the IoWCR noted that major modernisation work was needed on the Yarmouth line infrastructure, and imposed less favourable financial terms. For a time this was accepted, but in April 1913 the IoWCR was informed that the FY&NR would work its own line from 1 July 1913. As well as suddenly needing to acquire rolling stock, the FY&NR had to provide its own station at Newport, just short of the convergence with the IoWCR. In fact two locomotives had to be acquired; the small number indicates how limited the train service was. The new independent arrangement started on 1 July 1913; passengers now had to change stations at Newport, and the inferior service and higher costs eventually pushed the FY&NR into bankruptcy. The FY&NR had its locomotives overhauled by the Isle of Wight Railway at Ryde, and the IoWCR charged a toll of £3 to pass them through Newport. The problem of the station at Newport was resolved in August 1914.

== Grouping of the railways ==
The outbreak of World War I resulted in government control of the railways; this resulted in infrastructure improvements being deferred and the income of the company was hit. A national strike and post-war government control of fares, as well as much-improved bus competition and improved wage rates and working conditions for staff all attacked the financial situation of the line.

Under the terms of the Railways Act 1921, the main line railways of Great Britain were "grouped" into four large companies; all of the Isle of Wight lines were absorbed into the new Southern Railway from 1 January 1923. (Note: For administrative reasons the absorption was into the London and South Western Railway on the previous day.) The ordinary shareholders of the IoWCR got £3 for each £100 share (The absorption of the FY&NR was delayed until 1 August 1923 due to negotiations over the financial terms; during the period from 1 January, when the FY&NR refused the offered settlement, the company's trains were again barred from the main Newport station).

The Southern Railway brought capital to the island to pay for improvements. The two single lines between Smallbrook and St John's Road were converted to a conventional double track by the installation of crossovers at Smallbrook in 1926; the arrangement was applied in the summer months, and the Smallbrook Junction signal box was closed in winter, when line capacity was not an issue. A peak train service of 27 trains each way daily was run on the Newport to Cowes section by 1925.

The antiquated locomotive fleet was improved, by retaining the A1X 'Terrier' class and bringing in some LSWR O2 class 0-4-4T engines that had been displaced by the electrification of London suburban services; the four-wheel coaches were also abolished, and bogie coaches brought in. The improvements brought about a marked increase in business, but it was of course highly seasonal, and the buses running on improved roads were far more convenient for many travellers. The short distances on the island meant that goods traffic was at a serious disadvantage against road competition.

A new passing place was created at Havenstreet about 1926, as that was a more convenient crossing point on the line; Ashey and Whippingham loops were reduced to goods status only, and passenger trains did not cross there. Ventnor Town station had its name changed to Ventnor West.

Weekly tickets for unlimited travel on the island were introduced and proved very popular with holidaymakers on the island. In the summer of 1932, new through trains were run: six coaches were labelled "East and West Through Train" and ran Mondays to Fridays from Shanklin to Freshwater and back, calling only at Sandown, Merstone Junction, Newport, Carisbrooke and Yarmouth. An E1 class engine worked this train between Shanklin and Newport, and an A1X from Newport to Freshwater. The old IoWCR railcar had been rebuilt several years before as an open third saloon with wooden slat seats was now rebuilt into a third-class corridor observation coach to run in the through train.

This was immediately popular, and additional through trains were run in the 1933 summer service between the Ryde–Ventnor line and the Freshwater branch. The original through train, now starting from Ventnor with an accelerated timing, and became the first named train, each coach carrying a board with The Tourist in gold on a red background. A second through fast train was also included in the programme between Ryde Pier Head and Freshwater, the first for twenty years.

In this period it was the practice at Cowes for the coaches to be gravitated into platform 1 (which was generally used) after the arriving engine had been released; this practice continued until closure. The facilities at Medina Wharf were modernised, with a large concrete pier structure being provided, equipped with two massive transporter cranes. Rolling stock brought in to modernise the island's fleet was generally brought in here. There was a staff halt on the main line.

In 1932–33, the Southern Railway brought in four E1 tank engines to operate heavier freight trains.

== Nationalisation ==
On 1 January 1948, the railways passed into nationalised ownership under British Railways, following the Transport Act 1947. World War II had caused further decline in the competitive position of the railways on the island, and the minimal carryings on the Merstone to Ventnor line resulted in its closure on 13 September 1952. The Newport to Freshwater line was closed on 21 September 1953. The Newport to Sandown line continued for a while, but on 6 February 1956 it too closed. The former IoWCR line from Smallbrook to Cowes via Newport, carrying a passenger train service from Ryde to Cowes, was the only residual part of the IoWCR now extant.

The decision was taken to retain only the Ryde to Shanklin section on the island, and the Ryde–Newport–Cowes service, and the route from Smallbrook to Cowes closed on 21 February 1966, bringing about the end of the IoWCR network.

== Stock ==
=== Locomotives ===
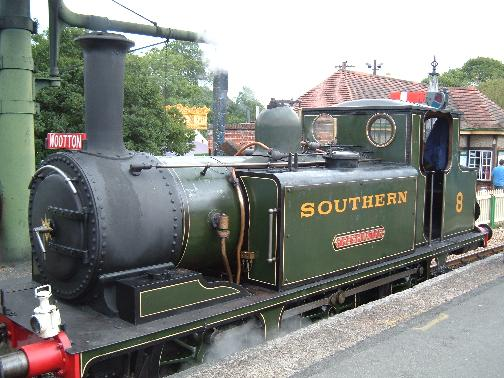
A1 Class 'Terrier' locomotive Freshwater in Southern Railway livery at the Isle of Wight Steam Railway. This locomotive was originally used on the Freshwater, Yarmouth and Newport Railway.

In use IoWCR/predecessor	Number	Name	Builder	Class	Type	Built	Notes
1861	1	Pioneer	Slaughter Gruning	Works 453	2-2-2WT	1861	Originally owned by C&NR from September 1861. Withdrawn 1901.
1906	1		Hawthorn Leslie	Works 2663 or 2669	Railmotor	1906	Sold out of service 1918.
1861	2	Precursor	Slaughter Gruning	Works 454	2-2-2WT	1861	Withdrawn 1901.
1909	2	Seaham Harbour			0-4-4T	1895	Originally owned by Marquis of Londonderry's Railway (later North Eastern Railway) until July 1909. Sold out of service 1917.
1870	3	Mill Hill	Black, Hawthorn & Company	Works 116	0-4-2ST	1870	Withdrawn 1918.
1876	4	Cowes	Beyer, Peacock & Company	Works 1583	2-4-0T	1876	Originally owned by Ryde & Newport. Withdrawn 1925.
1876	5	Osborne	Beyer, Peacock & Company	Works 1584	2-4-0T	1876	Withdrawn 1926.
1875	6	Newport	RW Hawthorn, Leslie & Company	Works 1127	2-2-2WT	1861	Originally owned by Whitehaven Railway. Purchased by Newport Junction 1875. Withdrawn 1890. Scrapped 1895.
1890	6		Black Hawthorn & Company	Works 999	4-4-0T	1890	Withdrawn 1925.
1880	7	Whippingham	Slaughter Gruning	Works 443	4-4-0T	1861	Originally North London Railway No. 35A until March 1880. Withdrawn 1906.
1908	7		Beyer, Peacock & Company	Works 2231	2-4-0T	1882	Originally Midland & South Western Junction Railway No. 6 until December 1906. Withdrawn 1925.
1898	8		Beyer. Peacock & Company	Works 3942	2-4-0T	1898	Withdrawn 1929.
March 1899	9		Brighton	LB&SCR A1 class	0-6-0T	1872	Originally London, Brighton & South Coast Railway No. 75 Blackwall until March 1899. Withdrawn 1927.
April 1900	10		Brighton	LB&SCR A1 class	0-6-0T	1874	Originally LB&SCR No. 69 Peckham until April 1900. Withdrawn 1936.
January 1902	11		Brighton	LB&SCR A1 class	0-6-0T	1878	Originally No. 40 Brighton. Arrived in 1902. Renamed and renumbered in 1930. Returned to mainland 1947. Now preserved on Isle of Wight Steam Railway.
November 1903	12		Brighton	LB&SCR A1 class	0-6-0T	1880	Originally LB&SCR No. 84 Crowborough until November 1903. Withdrawn 1936.

Between 1898 and 1905, the railway purchased four London, Brighton and South Coast Railway A1 "Terrier" class locomotives to operate its trains. One of these had been sent by the LBSCR to the Paris Exhibition of 1878, where it won a gold medal. In 1901, this locomotive was bought by the IoWCR and was numbered 11, then brought to the island on 8 January 1902. This locomotive is preserved at the Isle of Wight Steam Railway.

=== Coaching stock ===
At the grouping, the IoWCR had 37 passenger coaches and 12 non-passenger coaching stock vehicles. The passenger coaches comprised sixteen third-class (allotted SR numbers 2441–2456), eleven composites (6347–6357), six brake thirds (4098–4103), three brake composites (6987–6989) and one first-class saloon (7995). The non-passenger coaching stock comprised six guard's vans (979, 990–994), six open carriage and baggage boxes (4385–4390) and one horse box (3369). One guard's van was described as a mail van.

=== Goods stock ===
There were 317 goods vehicles lasting to grouping in 1923. These comprised 251 open goods wagons (SR nos. 27976–28226), 45 covered goods wagons (SR nos. 46987–47031), nine flat trucks (59024–59032), eight cattle wagons (53380–53387), three brake vans (56035–56037) and one tar tank (61383). In addition to these, there were eight in departmental stock: four ballast wagons (62881–62884), two water tanks, one travelling crane (429S) and a match truck (429SM). The open goods wagons were also used for coal, and had carrying capacities ranging from 6 to 10 long tons (6.1 to 10.2 t). The flat trucks included six designated as timber trucks – these had one or two transverse bolsters to support the load. The crane was hand-operated, and could lift 5 long tons (5.1 t); and the match truck was used to provide room for the crane jib when travelling.

== Station list ==
=== Cowes to Ryde (Smallbrook) ===
Closed 21 February 1966.

- Cowes; opened 16 June 1862
- Mill Hill; opened 1871;
- Medina Platform; unadvertised stop for Parkhurst Prison, opened by 1896;
- Cement Mills Halt; possibly in use from February 1879, certainly from 1905;
- Newport; opened 16 June 1862;
- Whippingham; opened 20 December 1875; closed 21 September 1953;
- Wootton; opened June 1876; closed 21 September 1953;
- Haven Street; opened June 1876; renamed Havenstreet 1958;
- Ashey; opened 20 December 1875;
- Smallbrook Junction; opened 21 July 1991 as an interchange station with Isle of Wight Steam Railway only. Junction with former Isle of Wight Railway line.

=== Newport to Sandown line ===
Closed 6 February 1956.

- Newport (above);
- Pan Lane; opened 11 August 1875; closed 1 June 1879;
- Shide; opened 1 February 1875;
- Blackwater; 1 February 1875;
- Merstone; 1 February 1875; Merstone Junction from 1897 until 1911;
- Horringford; opened 1 February 1875;
- Newchurch; 1 February 1875;
- Alverstone; 1 February 1875;
- Sandown; station of the Isle of Wight Railway.

=== Merstone to Ventnor ===
Closed 15 September 1952.

- Merstone (above);
- Godshill; opened 20 July 1897;
- Whitwell; opened 20 July 1897;
- Ventnor St Lawrence; opened 20 July 1897; renamed St Lawrence 1900;
- Ventnor Town; opened 1 June 1900; renamed Ventnor West 1923.

== Heritage railway ==
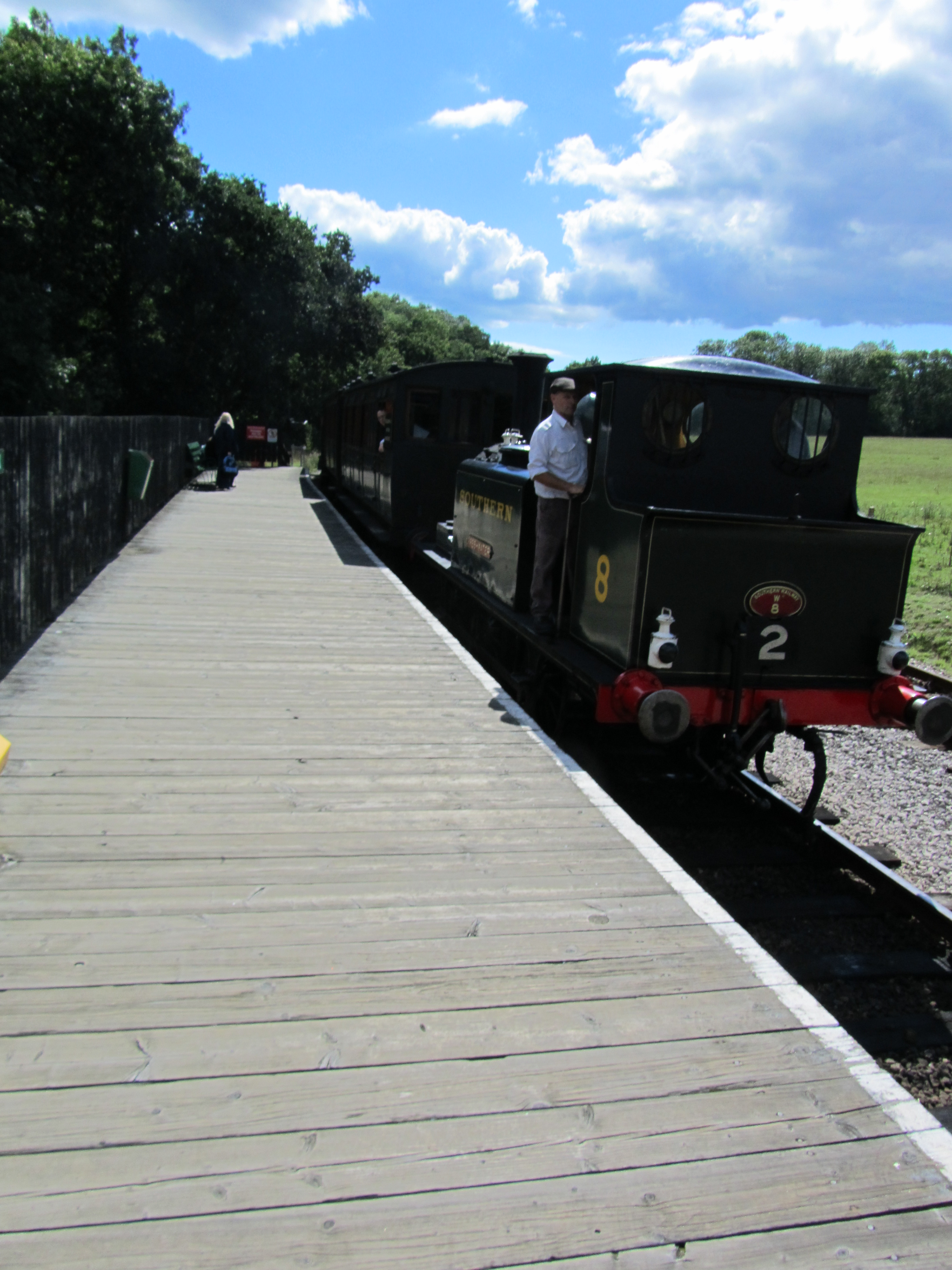
Isle of Wight Steam Railway locomotive Freshwater at Smallbrook Junction station.

The last steam trains on the Isle of Wight ran on the residual Ryde to Shanklin line on 31 December 1966. The steam locomotive W24 Calbourne and some carriages were purchased by an enthusiast group, and in 1971, the Isle of Wight Railway Co Ltd was formed to buy the 1 1/2-mile (2.4 km) length of track between Wootton and Havenstreet, operating steam trains as a heritage railway. In 1991 the line was extended to Smallbrook Junction on the Ryde–Shanklin line, where a new interchange station was built, enabling passengers to interchange with Island Line trains.

== See also ==
- Railways on the Isle of Wight
