= Newport Pan Lane railway station =

Former railway station in Isle of Wight, UK

Coordinates: 50°41′49″N 1°17′19″W

Pan Estate
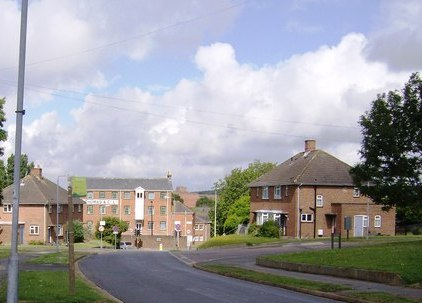
- As near as is possible to get to the original site

General information
- Location: Newport, Isle of Wight; England
- Grid reference: SZ503889
- Platforms: 1

Other information
- Status: Disused

History
- Original company: Isle of Wight (Newport Junction) Railway

Key dates
- 11 August 1875: Opened (unofficial)
- 6 October 1875: Opened (Official)
- 1 June 1879: Closed
Location

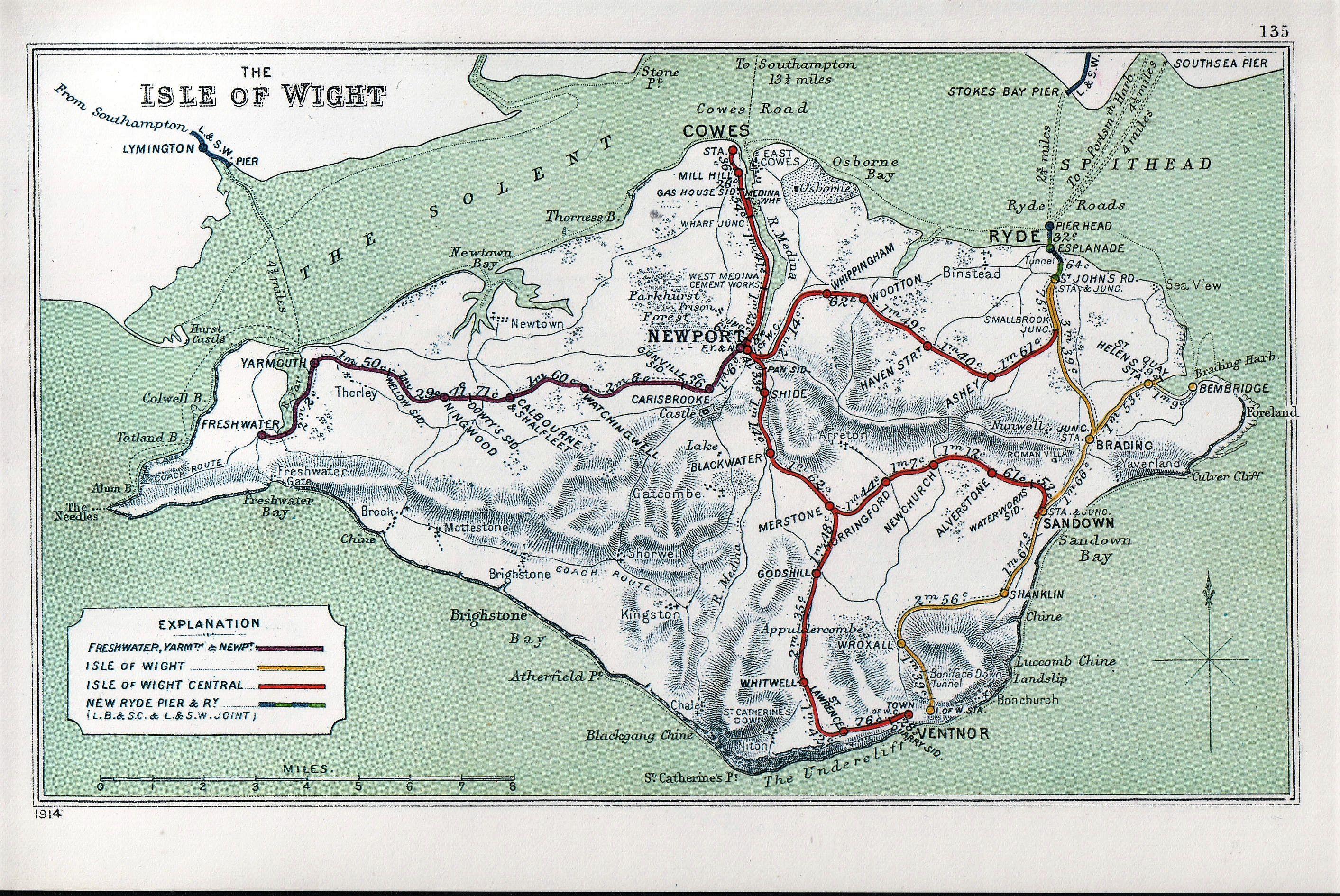
A 1914 Railway Clearing House map of lines around The Isle of Wight.

Newport Pan Lane railway station, was, for four years, the temporary terminus of the Isle of Wight (Newport Junction) Railway incorporated in 1868. Opened on 11 August 1875 and closed 4 years later on 1 June 1879 when the line was extended northwards to link with the new Newport Station (and thus the "Ryde and Newport Railway"). Any trace of the station has long since gone and today the nearest landmark is an alleyway leading from the residential road called "Furlongs".

Preceding station	Disused railways	Following station
Shide	Isle of Wight (Newport Junction) Railway (become part of IWCR in 1887)	Terminus

== See also ==
- List of closed railway stations in Britain
