= Ashey railway station =

Heritage railway station in Ashey, Isle Of Wight

Ashey
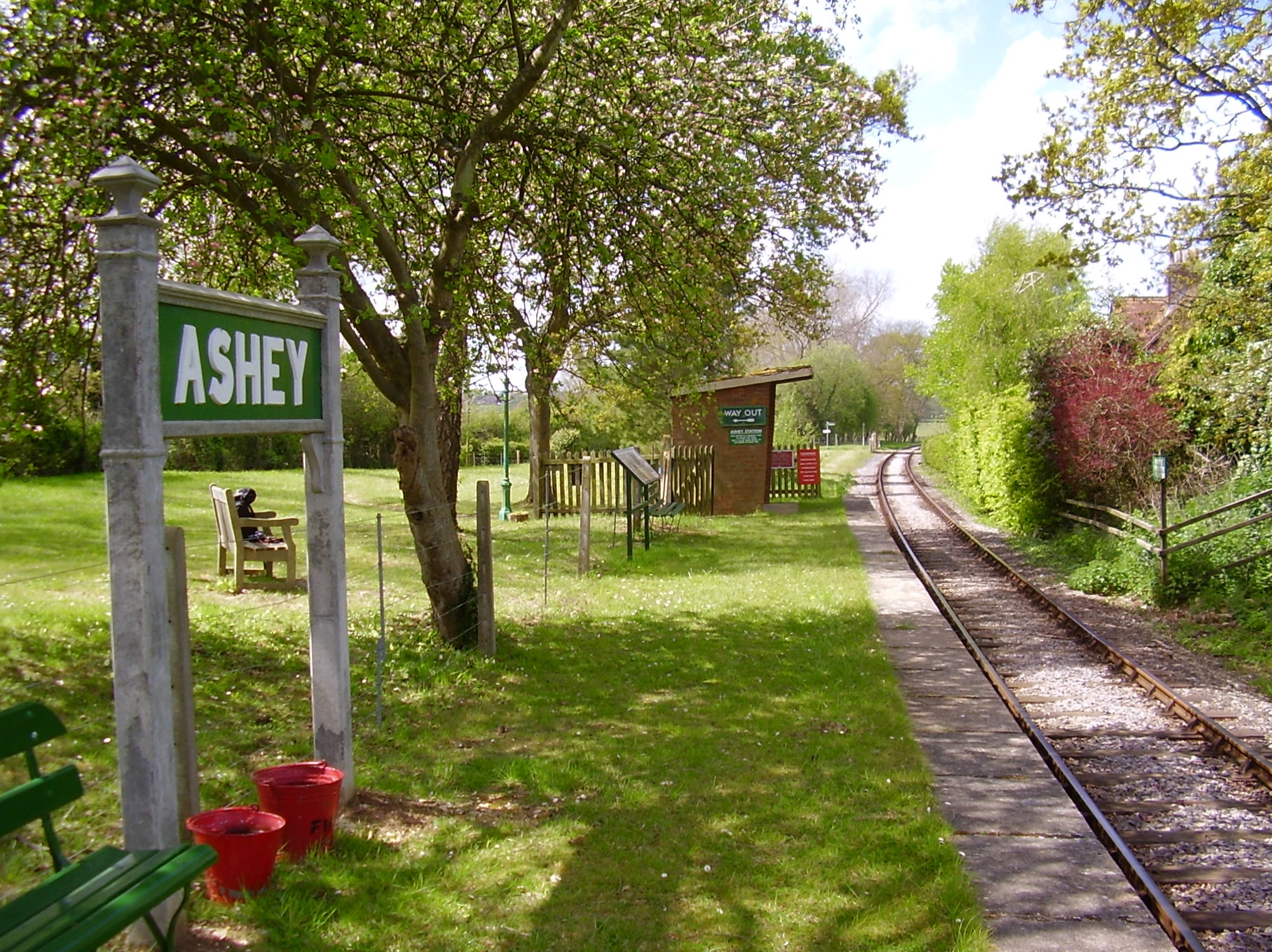

General information
- Location: South west of Deacons Lane, Isle of Wight; England
- Coordinates: 50.69599°N 1.18442°W
- Grid reference: SZ577888
- System: Station on heritage railway
- Operator: Isle of Wight Steam Railway (since 1993 )
- Platforms: 1

History
- Original company: Ryde and Newport Railway (1875–1887)
- Pre-grouping: Isle of Wight Central Railway (1887–1923)
- Post-grouping: Southern Railway (1923–1948); Southern Region of British Railways (1948–1966)

Key dates
- 20 December 1875: Opened
- 1950s: resited
- 21 February 1966: Closed
- 2 May 1993: Reopened
Location

Ashey railway station is a station serving the village of Ashey on the Isle of Wight in England. It was on the line which ran from Ryde to Newport. It had a passing loop when built but this was taken out of use when a loop was provided at Havenstreet instead. The substantial station buildings were abandoned in BR days due to subsidence of the main platform, with the line moved to the opposite platform.

== History ==
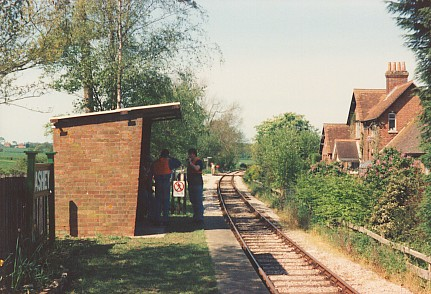
Ashey station in 1993, on the day it reopened to serve the heritage steam railway. The station consists of a shelter shown here, built by BR in the 1950s, with the original substantial station buildings on the right behind the bushes on the other platform.

The station was opened by the Ryde and Newport Railway, which then amalgamated with other island railways to form the Isle of Wight Central Railway. Becoming part of the Southern Railway during the Grouping of 1923, the station passed to the Southern Region of British Railways on nationalisation in 1948. It was then closed by the British Railways Board, but was reopened by the Isle of Wight Steam Railway, a heritage railway, in 1993. The station building were sold by British Rail in 1968 and became a private house. The building was sold in 2025 to the Isle of Wight Steam Railway who are currently restoring it for railway use.

== Ashey Racecourse railway station ==
A branch ran from Ashey station to Ashey Quarry, and an additional station opened on this line by April 1884 to serve the adjacent race course. This station ceased operation around 1929 when the racecourse closed.

== Gallery ==
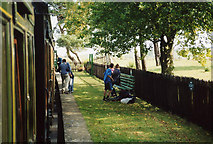
Platform at Ashey

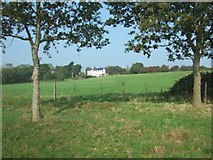
View from train on way to Smallbrook

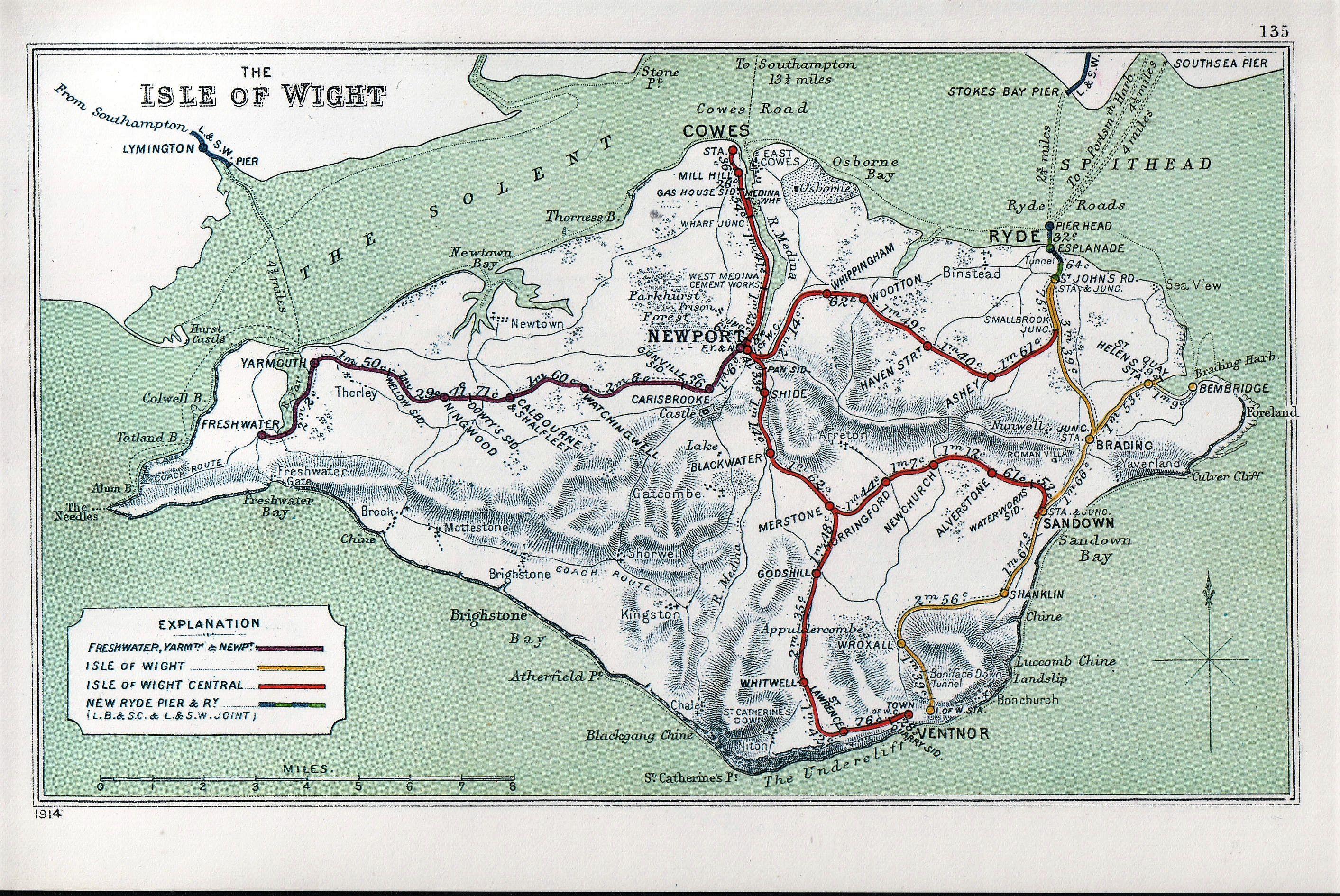
A 1914 Railway Clearing House map of lines around The Isle of Wight

| Preceding station | Heritage railways | Following station |
|---|---|---|
| Havenstreet towards Wootton | Isle of Wight Steam Railway | Smallbrook Junction Terminus |
