= Blackwater railway station (Isle of Wight) =

Railway station in England

Blackwater
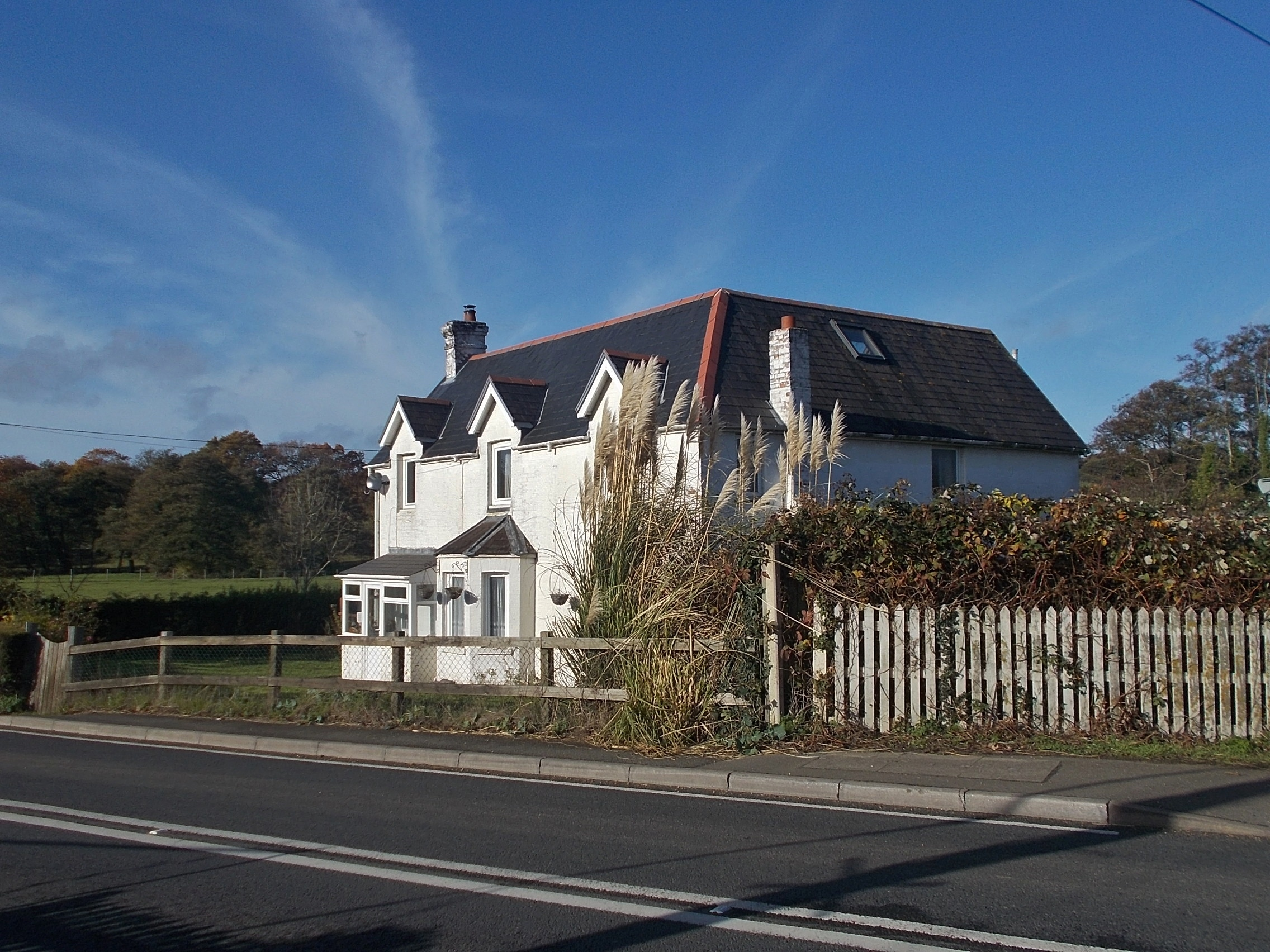
- The old station house in 2018

General information
- Location: Blackwater, Isle of Wight; England
- Coordinates: 50.6746°N 1.2847°W
- Grid reference: SZ507864
- Platforms: 1

Other information
- Status: Disused

History
- Original company: Isle of Wight (Newport Junction) Railway
- Pre-grouping: Isle of Wight Central Railway
- Post-grouping: Southern Railway; Southern Region of British Railways

Key dates
- 1 February 1875: Opened
- 6 February 1956: Closed
Location

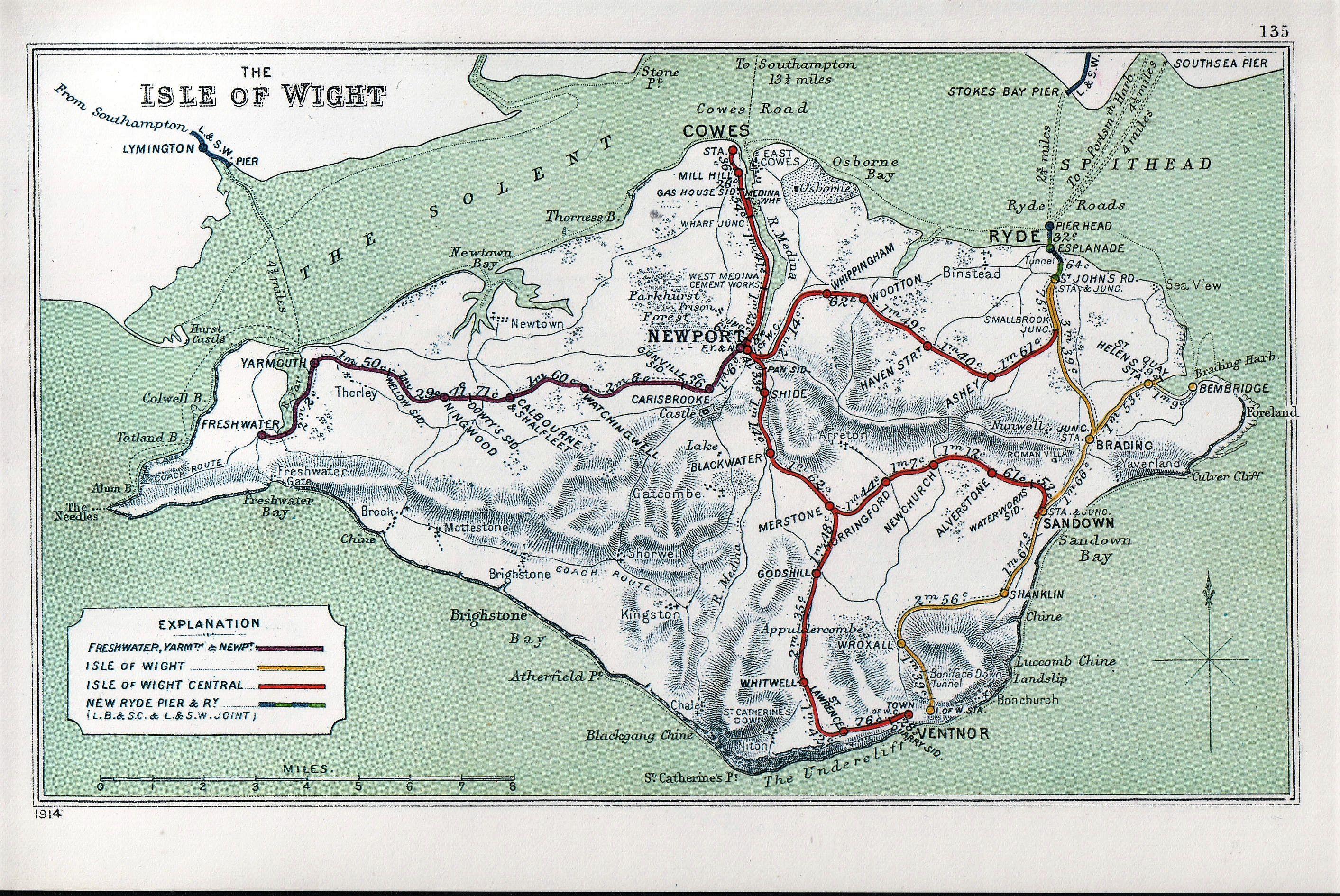
A 1914 Railway Clearing House map of lines around The Isle of Wight.

Blackwater railway station was a station at Blackwater, Isle of Wight, off the south coast of England.

== History ==
Located in the centre of the island on the A3020 road, it was an intermediate station on the line from Newport to Sandown, which was originally operated by the Isle of Wight (Newport Junction) Railway (incorporated 1868). The station opened in 1875 and closed, along with the line itself, in 1956. A rural station whose "heyday was before the advent of the motor car", during the inter-war years it was known for its large collection of enamel advertising boards. The station survives as an enlarged private house known as Brambles. The old railway track is now a cycle track, though this diverges slightly from the course of the old railway around the station building itself.

Preceding station	Disused railways	Following station
Merstone	British Railways; Southern Region; IoW CR : Sandown to Newport line	Shide

== See also ==
- List of closed railway stations in Britain
