= Newchurch railway station =

Former railway station in Isle of Wight, UK

Coordinates: 50°40′12″N 1°12′33″W

Newchurch
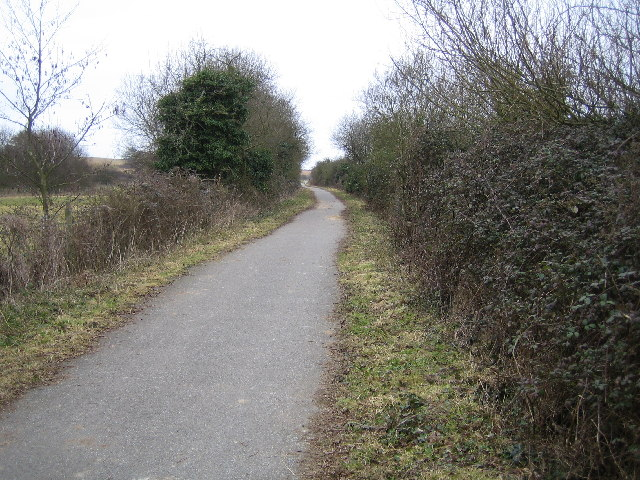
- The track bed near Newchurch Station is now a cycle path.

General information
- Location: Newchurch, Isle of Wight; England
- Grid reference: SZ577856
- Platforms: 1

Other information
- Status: Disused

History
- Pre-grouping: Isle of Wight (Newport Junction) Railway (1868-inc; 1875-1887); Isle of Wight Central Railway (1887 to 1923)
- Post-grouping: Southern Railway (1923 to 1948); Southern Region of British Railways (1948 to 1956)

Key dates
- 1 February 1875: Opened
- 6 February 1956: Closed
Location

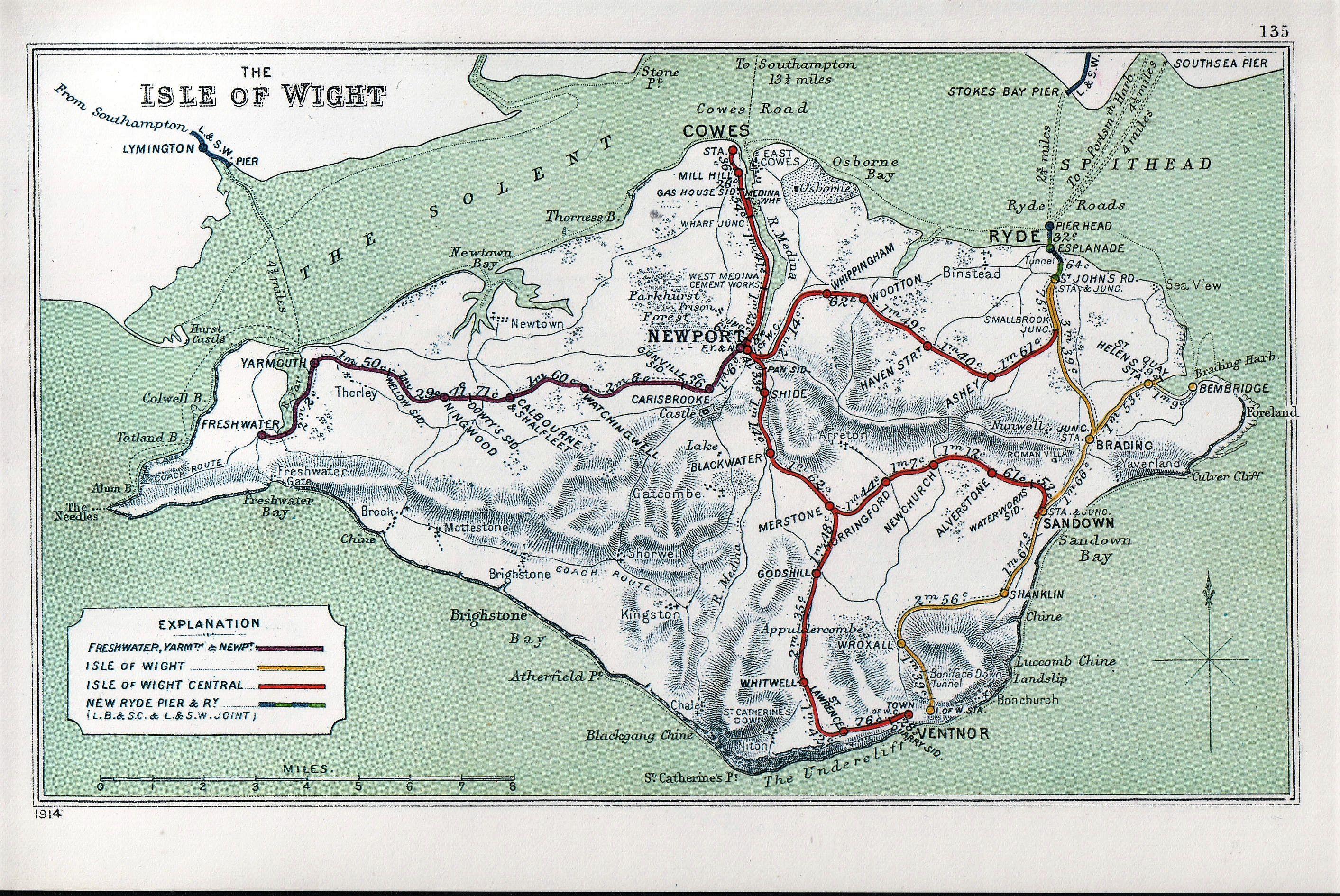
A 1914 Railway Clearing House map of lines around The Isle of Wight.

Newchurch railway station, was an intermediate station situated on the edge of Newchurch village on the line from Newport to Sandown incorporated by the Isle of Wight (Newport Junction) Railway in 1868, opened in 1875 and closed 81 years later. Despite its rural location a "respectable" number of families alighted at the simple station, "little more than a wooden hut". The nearest location to the site is a bungalow, Newchurch Crossing.

Preceding station	Disused railways	Following station
Alverstone	British Railways; Southern Region; IoW CR : Sandown to Newport line	Horringford

== See also ==
- List of closed railway stations in Britain
