= Mill Hill railway station (Isle of Wight) =

Former railway station in England

Coordinates: 50°45′26″N 1°17′50″W

Mill Hill (Isle of Wight) railway station
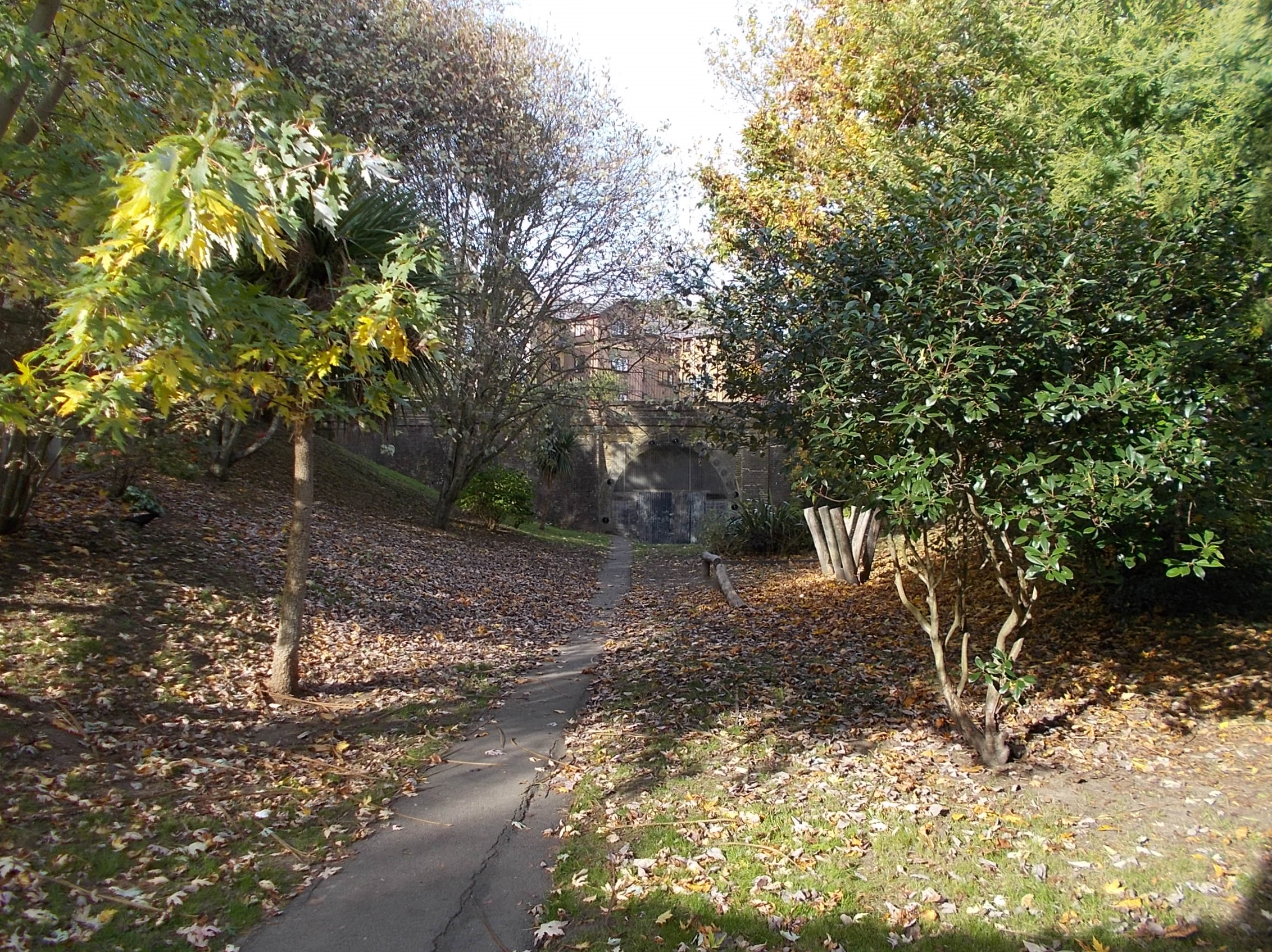
- The site of the former station in 2018, now a small park (Arctic Park). Looking north-west along the course of the old track, the platform was on the left. The blocked-up tunnel entrance can be seen at the far end of the park.

General information
- Location: Southern suburbs of Cowes, Isle of Wight; England
- Grid reference: SZ497954
- Platforms: 1

Other information
- Status: Disused

History
- Pre-grouping: Cowes and Newport Railway (1862–1887); Isle of Wight Central Railway (1887 to 1923)
- Post-grouping: Southern Railway (1923 to 1948); Southern Region of British Railways (1948 to 1966)

Key dates
- 1871: Opened
- 21 February 1966: Closed
Location

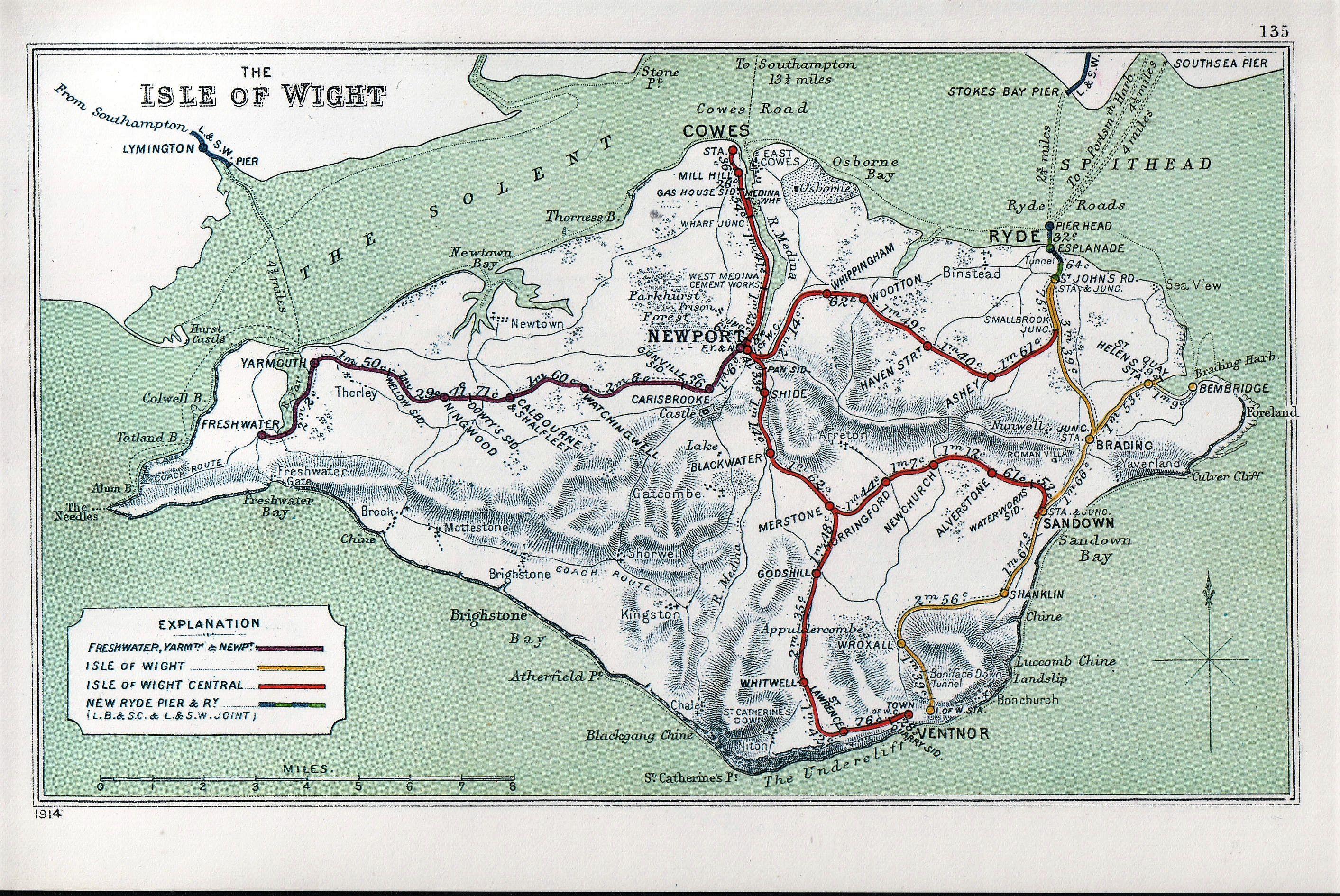
A 1914 Railway Clearing House map of lines around The Isle of Wight.

Mill Hill railway station is a disused station in Cowes on the Isle of Wight.

== History ==
It opened in 1871 and was first seen as the down train from the main Cowes railway station emerged from the 208 yard tunnel along the curving platform, the sweep still visible in 2005 on a small area of grass where the demolished station once stood. Unlike many of the Island's railway stations, Mill Hill was busy at the beginning and end of each working day, depositing and picking up hundreds of workmen from shipyards.

Conversely, after passenger closure in 1966 a single employee spent six months on duty at the crossing just past the station with not one chance to open it, although freight traffic continued to Medina Wharf for a few months after passenger trains were withdrawn.

== Stationmasters ==
- William Henry Strawn ca. 1879 ca. 1880 (afterwards station master at Haven Street)
- John William Gibbs ca. 1896
- F. Williams ca. 1910
- Percy Hawkins ca. 1920

Preceding station	Disused railways	Following station
Medina Wharf	British Rail; Southern Region; IoW CR : Newport to Cowes line	Cowes

== See also ==
- List of closed railway stations in Britain
