= Cowes railway station =

Former railway station in Isle of Wight, UK

Coordinates: 50°45′44″N 1°17′56″W

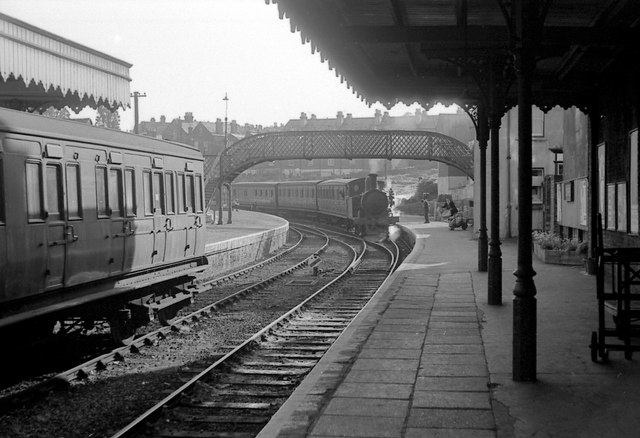
- The station in 1963

General information
- Location: Cowes, Isle of Wight; England
- Grid reference: SZ496960
- Platforms: 3

Other information
- Status: Disused

History
- Pre-grouping: Cowes and Newport Railway (1862-1887); Isle of Wight Central Railway (1887 to 1923)
- Post-grouping: Southern Railway (1923 to 1948); Southern Region of British Railways (1948 to 1966)

Key dates
- 16 June 1862: Opened
- 21 February 1966: Closed
Location

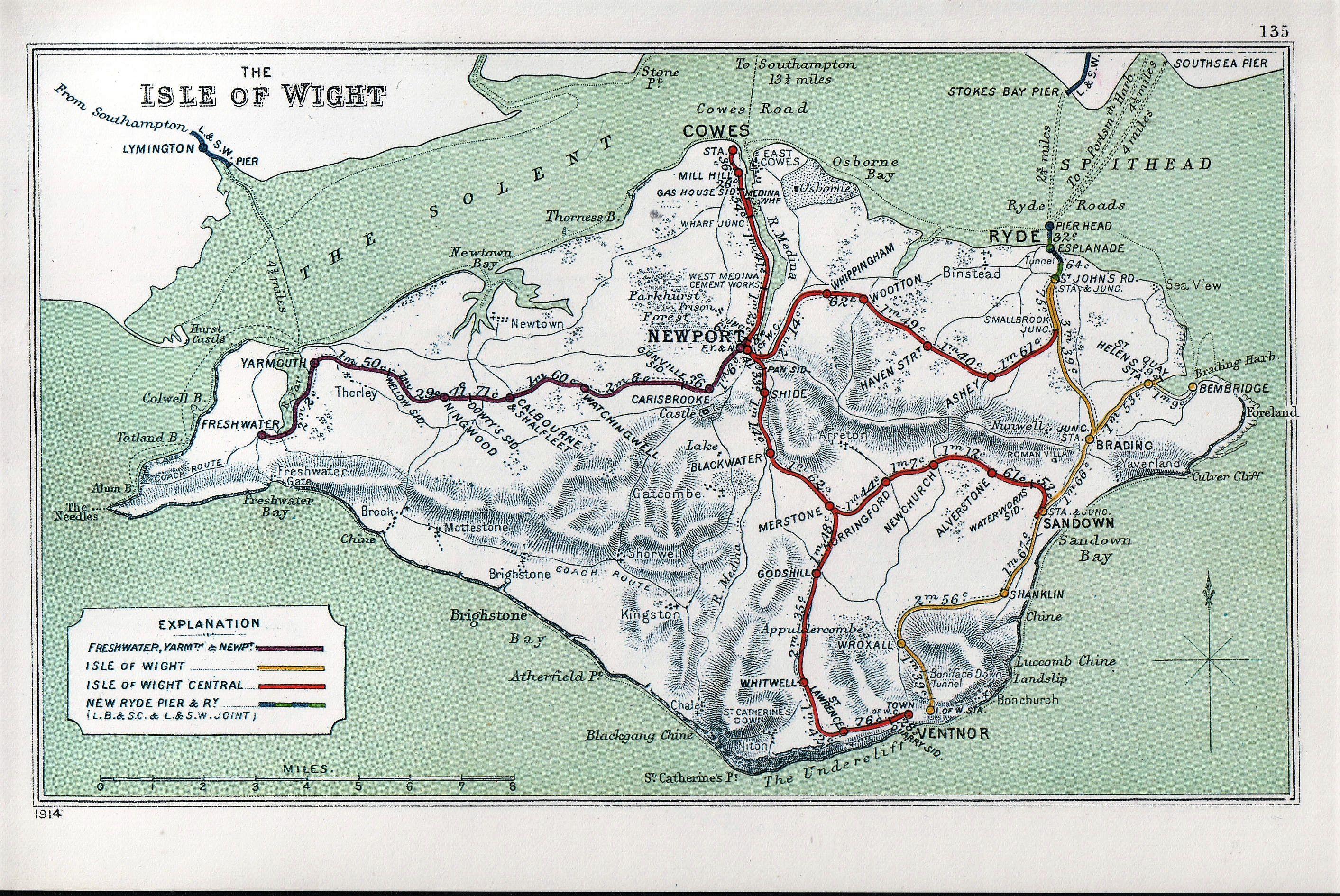
A 1914 Railway Clearing House map of lines around The Isle of Wight.

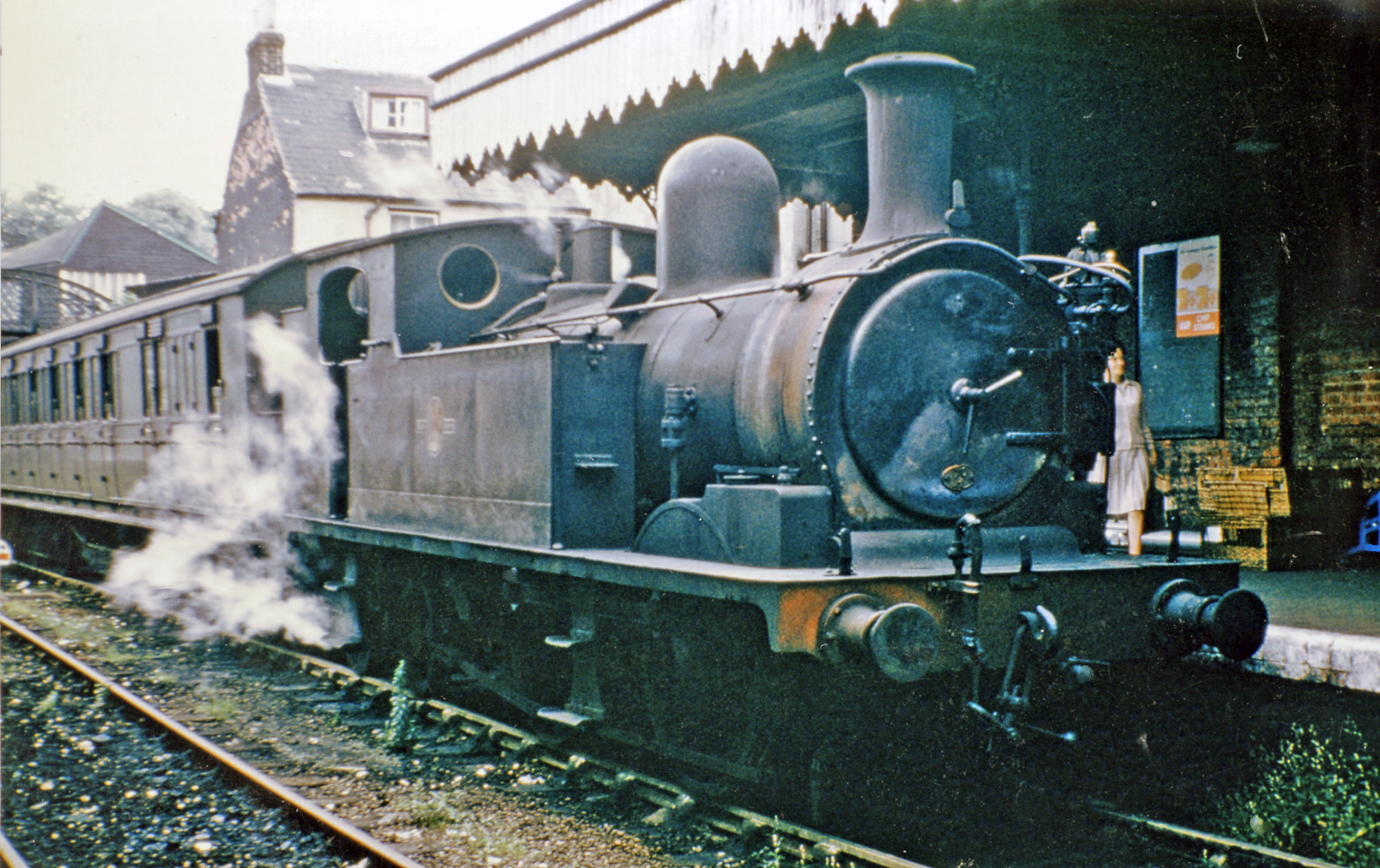
Train from Ryde Pier Head in 1965

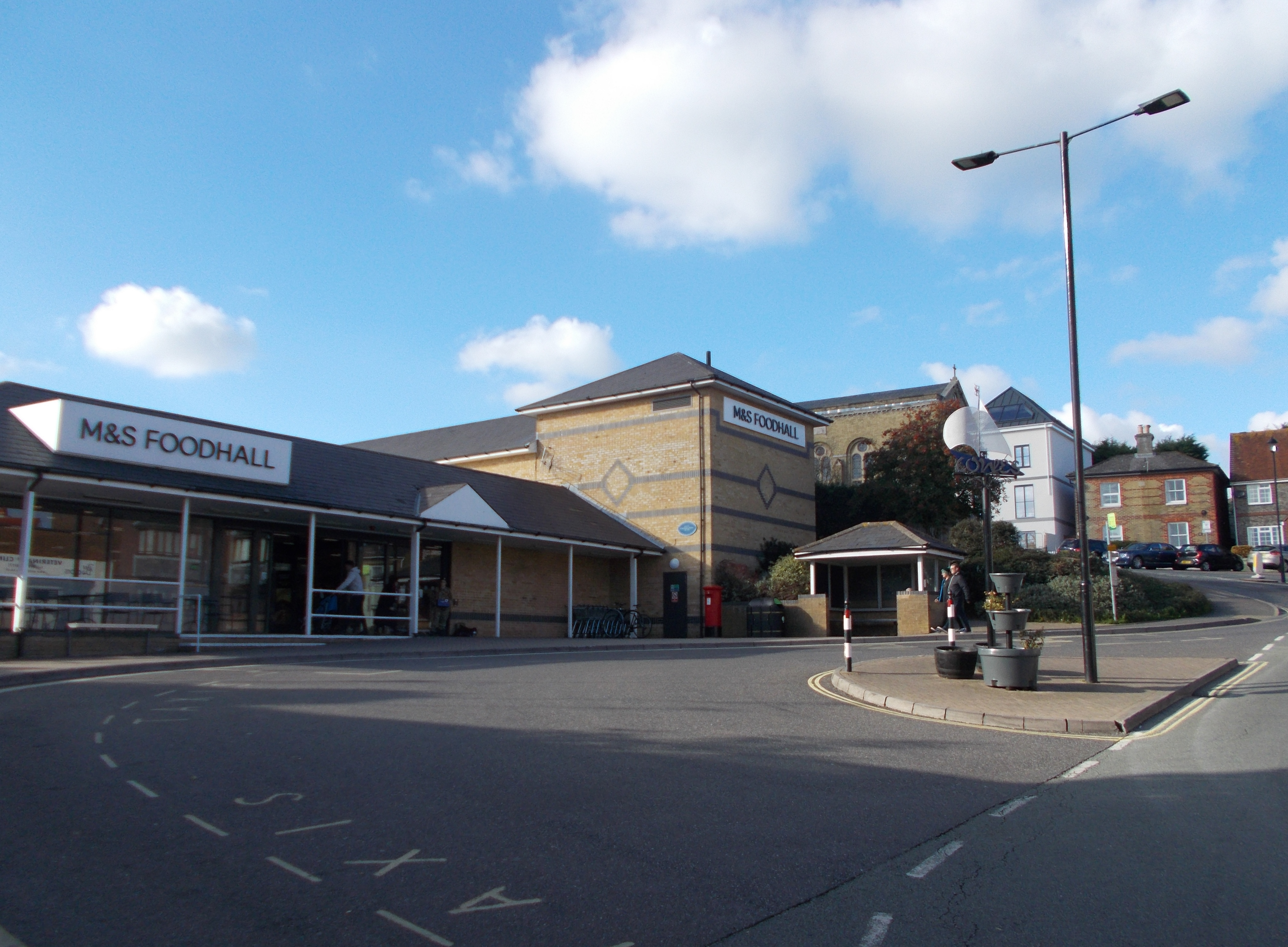
The site of the former station in 2018, now occupied by a Marks and Spencer store. The blue wall plaque near the centre of picture reads: ISLE OF WIGHT STEAM RAILWAY The site of Cowes Railway Station 1862-1966 RECORDING THE ISLAND'S RAILWAY HISTORY

Cowes railway station was a railway station in Cowes on the Isle of Wight, off the south coast of England. It took pride in being the "prettiest station on the Garden Isle".

== History ==
Opened in 1862, the very first on the island, as part of the inaugural "Cowes and Newport" railway, it expanded to three platforms as the railway branched out towards Ryde in the years before the motor bus began to diminish trade. In its time prosperous enough to have a WH Smith bookstall, its latter years were considerably leaner as more and more people took their holidays abroad. The station has long since been demolished and today the area is a supermarket and municipal car park. The footbridge was salvaged and moved to Medstead and Four Marks railway station on the Watercress Line heritage railway.

In its later years Cowes station was notable for an unusual operating procedure. The engine would propel its empty carriages backwards up the 1-in-95 gradient towards Mill Hill and then run forward and round the train using a crossover. The carriages were then allowed to run back down into the station by gravity, controlled by handbrake by the guard, and the locomotive was reattached to haul its train back to Newport and Ryde.

== Stationmasters ==
- Mr. Phillips until 1869
- William Alford ca. 1879 - 1885
- J.R. Thomas from 1885
- William B.S. Greenwood 1889 - 1891 (formerly station master at Newport)
- George William Ranger 1891 - 1894 (formerly station master at Yarmouth, afterwards station master at Newport)
- Thomas Henry Tutton ca. 1896 - 1913
- Samuel Urry 1913 - 1914 (formerly station master at Freshwater)
- Henry L. Hill 1914 - ca. 1938
- Francis E. West 1944 - 1952 (formerly station master at Rowlands Castle, afterwards station master at Alton)

Preceding station	Disused railways	Following station
Mill Hill	British Rail; Southern Region; IoW CR : Newport to Cowes line	Terminus

== See also ==
- List of closed railway stations in Britain
