= Gunville =

Coordinates: 50.698334°N 1.321469°W

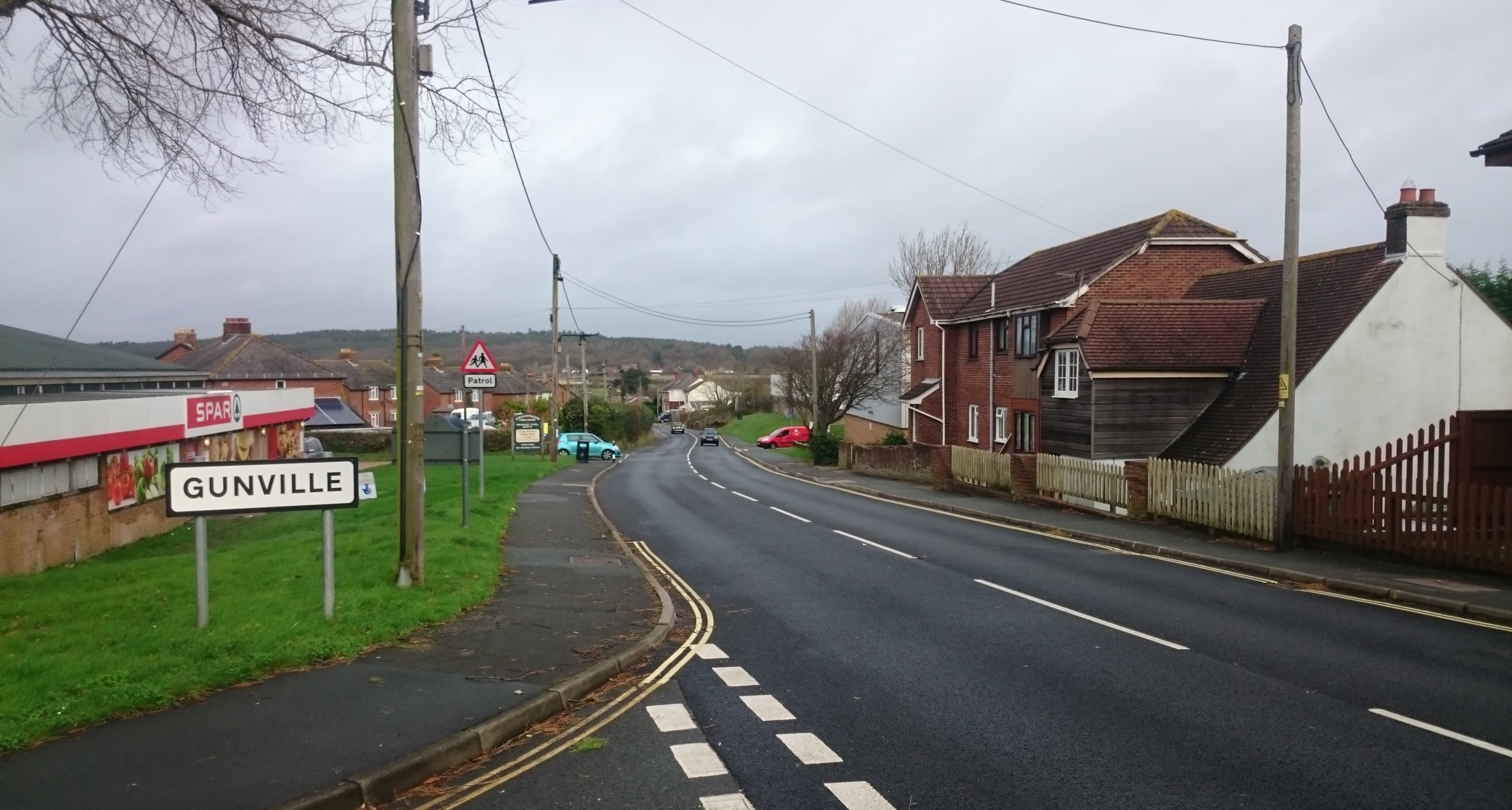

- Location within the Isle of Wight
- OS grid reference: SZ480889
- Unitary authority: Isle of Wight
- Ceremonial county: Isle of Wight
- Region: South East
- Country: England
- Sovereign state: United Kingdom
- Post town: NEWPORT
- Postcode district: PO30
- Dialling code: 01983
- Police: Hampshire and Isle of Wight
- Fire: Hampshire and Isle of Wight
- Ambulance: Isle of Wight
- UK Parliament: Isle of Wight West

Gunville is a small settlement on the Isle of Wight, off the south coast of England. It consists largely of housing, although there are also a small number of shops, a couple of charity shops, some retail warehouses, a snooker hall, Methodist Church and a fishing lake. The settlement seems to date from some time after 1800, although the vast majority of the buildings currently standing in Gunville date from after 1900.

The village lies south of Forest Road (A3054), joining to the larger settlement of Carisbrooke. It is approximately 1.25 miles (2.01 km) west of Newport and chiefly lies along a one mile (1.6 km) stretch, either side of Gunville Road (B3323). It encompasses Alvington Manor View, The Bramleys, Gunville Crescent, Spring Walk, Pineview Drive, Taylor Road, Gunville West, Chapel Close, Broadwood Lane, Park Close, Forest Hills, Arthur Moody Drive, Ash Lane, Ash Close and The Hollows.

In the past, the centre of the Island was made up of a number of small and distinct villages, such as Newport, Carisbrooke, Gunville, Clatterford, Shide, New Village, Barton's Village, Bellecroft, Pan, Hunny-Hill and Fairlee. As time went on, Newport and Carisbrooke have largely engulfed and absorbed all of these villages except for Gunville, although even for Gunville there have had to be concerted efforts to keep the name alive, with many people preferring to refer to it as a part of Carisbrooke. In 2009, the Council actually replaced the Gunville signs with those of Carisbrooke, taking it off the map completely. However, after complaints from local residents, the Gunville signs were returned.

In fact, the Newport conurbation has become so large, that there is no visible break whatsoever between, Newport, Carisbrooke and Gunville, with the only separation being the old historical boundaries. There has been some argument as to where the dividing line between Carisbrooke and Gunville actually lies. In 2009, a new sign was erected showing that Gunville started at the point where Priory Road becomes Gunville Road, at the junction with School Lane. This was the view held in a Newport Parish Council meeting of 2009. But, most people accept that in the past, the starting point of Gunville was the old railway bridge which allowed trains to run under the road, half a mile further to the North. However, this railway bridge and its track have long been demolished, after the railway itself closed in 1953, leaving nothing to visually separate the two villages (See below). But the Gunville sign has now been moved further north to the junction of Alvington Manor View and Gunville Road, virtually the spot where the old bridge used to be.

== Name derivation ==
No records seem to exist of how Gunville derived its name and there are many differing theories. One version is that an owner of Alvington Manor in 1640, married a man from Tarrant Gunville in Dorset and named the area in his honour. Another is that its name comes from Victorian times, when the area was used to store ammunition, and that the name was derived from "Gun Village". However, in an 1884 edition of the Isle of Wight County Press, it is stated that in the early 1800s, a James Lambert owned a house which was close to Forest Road. This house was occupied by officers of the nearby Parkhurst Barracks (renamed Albany Barracks shortly after completion) and that there were two small cannons in the grounds at the front of the house. Because of this, the house became known as 'Gun Villa' and the hamlet which sprang up soon afterwards came to become known as Gunville.

There are also theories that the name Gunville derived from a French nobleman by the name of William de Gundeville, who was said to have lived in the area of Carisbrooke in 1292. In 1979, the Medina Borough Council Public Works Committee announced that a new road on the Forest Hills Estate was to be called De Gondeville Avenue in his honour. However, this name only seems to have been used for a couple of months, with the road ultimately called Forest Hills.

Another theory is simply that Gunville is a derivation of Gunfield, as marked on a map from the 1700s and also asserted by William Tucker Stratton, a nineteenth century local historian.

== Gunville Lake ==
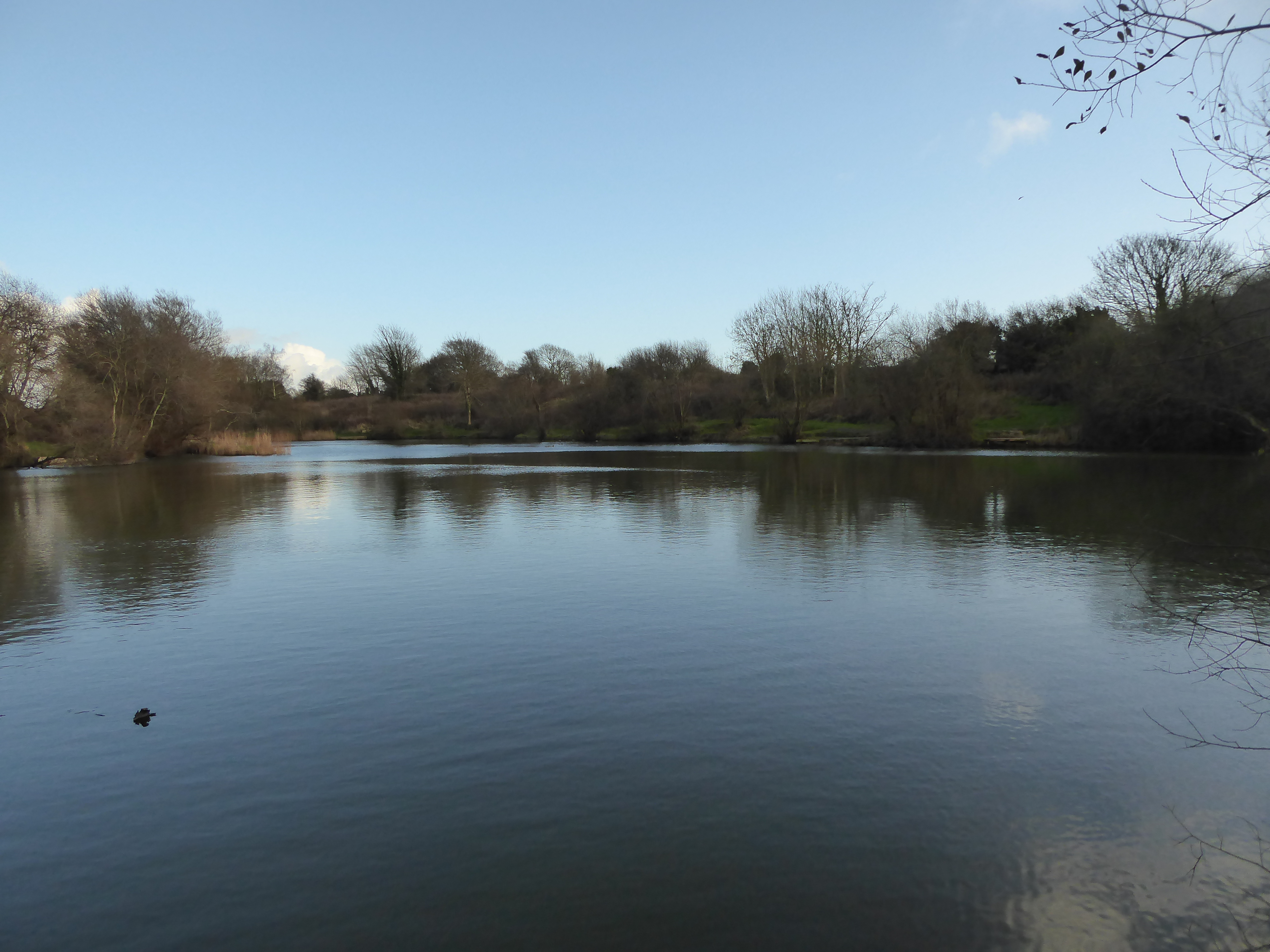
Gunville Lake

The privately owned Gunville Lake is on the west side of Gunville Road and is the oldest fishery owned by the Isle of Wight Freshwater Angling Association (IWFAA). This freshwater section of the Isle of Wight Angling Society was formed in 1956, although they were unable to take full control of the lake's lease until 1969. During all of this time, there was quite a fight to preserve the pond from the constant tipping of rubbish and the spoil from nearby excavations.

Gunville Lake covers an area of 4.5 acres, with thirty swims fishable and has been described as one of the finest freshwater fishing spots in the south of England. In 2001, there was a major exercise to clear the lake of unwanted vegetation and to improve land drainage. Gunville Lake is a mixed fishery, popular with carp specialists, with some fish reaching almost 30lb in weight. The lake contains carp, bream, tench, rudd, common roach, perch, pike and eel.

The lake formed part of the old brickworks (now demolished), which made bricks for the nearby Albany Barracks. In around 1933, part of the brickworks were abandoned when workmen struck an underground stream, causing it to fill with water to a depth of thirty feet in places. It is rumoured that the engine that was used to pull clay to the foundry still lies at the bottom of the lake. In the years leading up to around 1946, the size and depth of the lake reduced drastically, as the site was being used as a rubbish tip by the Newport Corporation (local council). Following the end of the Second World War, a lot of the barbed wire used, also ended up being dumped there. The lake might have been lost forever with the continual tipping, but the council relinquished their tipping rights in 1968. By that time, the lake had shrunk to only around 50 yards across and to only around three feet deep in places. The Council said that although they sympathised with the local anglers, they were giving up their tipping rights with reluctance, as they were unable to find an alternative site.

In its earlier days, the lake used to be referred to as a pond, but after the IWFAA took over the site in 1969 and cleared it to a depth exceeding five feet, it could officially then be classified as a lake. The success in transforming the lake from the old rubbish tip into a beautiful fishery was attributed to the "single-minded zeal of the Association Secretary, Bill Kingswell".

Tragedy struck the lake in 1957, when a 14-year-old schoolboy drowned whilst swimming with a friend. After disappearing in the water, he was later found by a combined police and Fire Brigade search in 18 feet of water, about 9 feet from the bank.

There used to be another fishing pond in Gunville. Although smaller than Gunville Lake, Coker's Pond nevertheless afforded some of the best carp fishing on the island and even attracted fishermen from the mainland to fish there. However, like Gunville Lake, it too suffered from the tipping of rubbish and earth over the years, especially in 1957, when excavations for the new nearby Carisbrooke College was needlessly dumped in the pond. Coker's Pond now no longer exists, after being filled in when a new housing estate was built over the site in 1994. The pond was under the land where Linnet Close and The Finches now lie.

== Gunville Stream ==
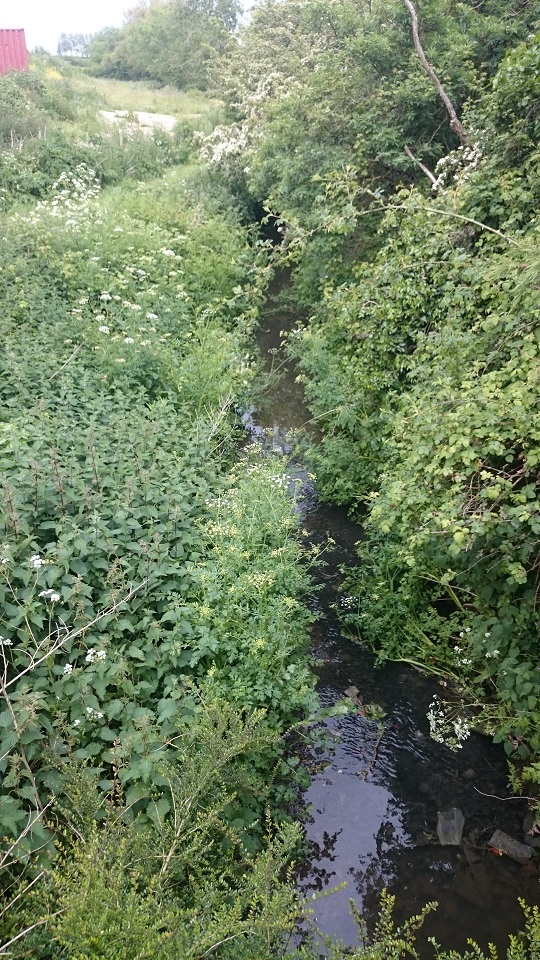
Gunville Stream

Gunville Stream is one of the main tributaries of the River Medina, others include Parkhurst Stream, Pan Stream, Lukely Brook and Merston Stream. Gunville Stream is approximately a mile and a half long. Its source is to the north west of Gunville and it flows under the bridge in the dip of Gunville Road, just to the north of Ash Lane and The Hollows. Continuing on, it flows into Lukely Brook, near the bottom of Hunnyhill road in Newport, which in turn feeds into the River Medina. Little is known about the history of the stream, however there are some concerns for its future, with the ongoing development of the Gunville and Newport land through which it flows.

== Gunville Trading Estate ==
This small retail estate on Taylor Road was built in 1970 across the road from Gunville Crescent, over what were originally allotment gardens. The main contractors were Fairholme Estate (Holdings) LTD. There are five retail units and one manufacturing warehouse.

== Carisbrooke and Gunville Methodist Church ==
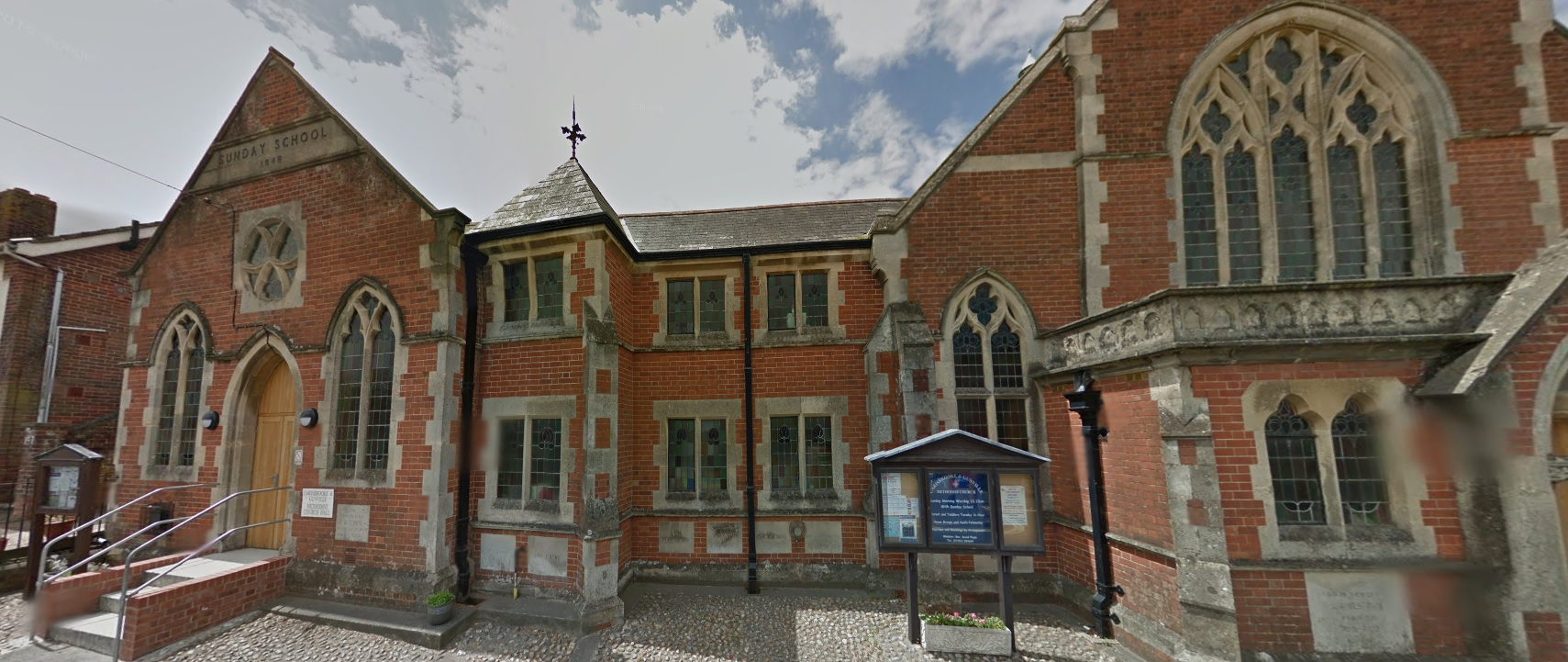
Gunville Methodist Church

The Carisbrooke & Gunville Methodist Church is arguably the most prominent building in Gunville, which partly dates back to 1848 and is of Gothic design, with red brick and Bath stone dressings. Originally, it was much smaller and was a Bethel Chapel, a Bible Christian denomination of the Methodist church. At that time, there were also two other Methodist churches in Gunville. These were the next-door Beulah Chapel, a Primitive Methodist denomination and the Ashen Grove Methodist Chapel, a Wesleyan denomination, which was further to the south. These last two chapels are no longer in existence, with the current building now also engulfing the site of the Beulah Chapel.

In 1907, the building was greatly extended on its north side, at a cost of approximately £2,000, with the new church building opening on 11 July. At the same time as extending the building, a new frontage was added to the old original chapel, which was to now serve as a Sunday School, to make it uniform with the front of the new chapel. The new building was designed by Mr S E Tomkins, architect of Newport and "admirably" built by Messrs T & E W Jenkins, contractors of Newport.

This extension was built because of the growing Gunville population, which made the size of the existing church inadequate. The new church was able to seat 250 to 300 people, with the first stone being laid by Mr Godfrey Baring, who was MP for the Isle of Wight at the time. The apex of the new extension has the name 'Bible Christian Methodist Church' inlaid into it. However, even during its opening ceremony, it was announced that the Bible Christians were joining with several other Methodist denominations, to form a new church called the United Methodist Church. In 1932, following yet more mergers with various other Methodist denominations, another new church was formed, known simply as the Methodist Church.

In 2007, an extension was added to the south of the building to incorporate a new kitchen, toilets and lobby. In 2009, another new lobby was added to the north end of the building. Better parking was also provided, with vehicular access off of Broadwood Lane, instead of Gunville Road.

== Nearby landmarks ==
Towards the North, on the far side of Forest Road is Parkhurst Forest.

To the West is farmland, although in 2016, two separate planning applications for new housing estates have been approved by the Isle of Wight Council on parts of this farmland adjacent to Alvington Manor View and Ash Lane. There has also been interest in submitting a third application for housing on the farmland in between these two development sites, adjacent to Forest Hills. This will extend the boundary of Newport and Gunville even further out to the West.

To the South, Gunville Road becomes Priory Road at the junction with School Lane, as it merges into the town of Carisbrooke. Whilst not strictly within the bounds of Gunville, the Waverley Inn serves as Gunville's local pub. The other noteworthy business just outside the boundary on Priory Road is Dave Death Motorcycles. Close by is also St. Mary's Church, Carisbrooke.

To the East, there are further housing estates. Whilst some are only just behind Gunville Road, they are regarded as being part of the Carisbrooke district. Carisbrooke College (formerly Carisbrooke High School), built in 1955, also lays in this direction.

== History ==
=== Gunville Brickworks (demolished) ===
The brickworks, with Gunville Bridge and the Gunville Railway Siding, taken sometime before 1933.

A major part of the early history of Gunville involves Gunville Brickworks, of which nothing now remains. There were many brickworks on the Island, many of them owned by the Pritchett dynasty, originally from Richard's Castle, Hereford. William Pritchett came to the Island after a 1770 Act of Parliament ordered a Workhouse to be built in Parkhurst Forest for around one thousand paupers. The Pritchett family won the contract in 1791 to supply the bricks and tiles to the Parkhurst Institute and set up a brickyard at Macintosh Hill, Parkhurst. The Institute, otherwise known as The House of Industry, was created to take in paupers from every parish of the island. Within its walls was also a lunatic asylum, hospital, school and chapel.

In 1793, following the completion of the workhouse, Pritchett moved on to supplying the bricks and tiles to build Parkhurst Barracks. The barracks were built to help counter the Napoleonic threat and were designed to accommodate up to 2,000 foreign soldiers in a 150-acre site that was difficult for desertion. Pritchett built a further brick yard in nearby Kitbridge to supply this vast project. In 1800, another yard was opened at Bierley and more followed at Newbridge, Wellow, Ningwood, Tapnell, Gurnard, Cowes, Northwood, Sandford, Rookley and Gunville.

The brickworks at Gunville date back to as early as sometime between 1863 and 1873. It was originally owned by a James Manning of the nearby Alvington Farm, who at times rented it out to tenants, rather than operate it himself. In 1894, there was a tragedy in one of the sandpits when one of Manning's carters was buried by sand falling from an overhang. He died from his injuries, with a verdict of accidental death being given.

In 1900, Francis Pritchett took over the lease for the brickyard, before eventually buying it outright from Manning, to expand and modernise it. When the work was completed in 1906, it was fully opened under the company name Pritchett & Co LTD. The site was ideal, as it had a good supply of red and white clay and an abundance of sand and loam. By then, the new brickworks was equipped with the most up-to-date machinery, including a large Lancashire boiler and two engines. There were steam-heated drying rooms, a continuously burning Hoffman's kiln and three intermittently burning kilns. An internal telephone system was installed and the company purchased its own steam road engine and wagon, replacing the traditional horse and cart. The brickworks was the first on the island to have continuous production and with the clay being taken directly from its own pits, it was capable of making three million bricks a year. In its best year, it produced 5.6 million goods of all varieties. Transportation was also easy, as the brickworks was next to a railway line and had its own siding (see below).

There were a number of clay pits at the brickyard, with a 1906 Geologists' field trip stating that "one pit showed a good section of Bracklesham Clays in a vertical position, with a peculiar drag over of the upper part of the pit, giving an appearance of a reversed dip, probably due to the steep slope of the hill. In another pit was seen the upper part of the Osborne Clays and the lower part of the Bembridge Limestone". Indeed, one of the pits eventually flooded, resulting in the formation of Gunville Lake (see above).

There were several more tragedies at the brickyard, the first being in 1906, when an 18-year-old worker was killed, whilst trying to repair a loose board. His clothes became entangled in an overhead revolving shaft, which was spinning at 100 revolutions a minute. Having been dragged around by the machine, he was rushed to hospital, but died of multiple injuries. In the inquest, no blame was attached to the company, although the worker's father was awarded £40 compensation for the loss of his son. In 1908, a six-year-old boy was killed on Gunville Lane, while playing on one of the yard's moving steam traction-engines. The engine, pulling two trucks, was returning empty from delivering bricks to the new Naval Hospital at Osborne House. Several children were playing by swinging on one of the truck's coupling bar, without the knowledge of the driver and his mate. When one child fell, he was killed instantly by the truck's wheel passing over his head. As the operators had tried to keep children away and had no knowledge that they were still there, an accidental death ruling was given. In 1911, there was almost another tragedy, when a little girl almost drowned in a deep pool at the brickyard. However, she was rescued by a young boy named Thomas Attrill, who received recognition for his bravery.

There were more troubles for the Pritchetts, just before the Great War in 1914, when both Gunville Brickyard and their other yard at Hillis, near Cowes went into liquidation. This was a serious blow for the Pritchetts and for many small investors who lost their money. Francis Pritchett gave the reasons as being differences of opinion amongst its administrative proprietors and the failure of other proprietors to understand and value Gunville Brickyard's ultra-modern practices, which placed the Company so far ahead of previous methods of manufacture. He spoke of the "pathos and misfortune" of this "sad chapter" and said that "History alone will give its verdict upon this stupendous folly". Whilst never regaining the Gunville yard, Pritchett nevertheless bounced back in 1919, whilst almost penniless, by opening a new yard at Northwood, Cowes.

After closing, Gunville brickyard then remained empty and unused for a number of years, through the First World War, which made finding labour difficult. However, it was eventually bought in 1923 by Samuel Saunders of Saunders-Roe, based at Columbine Works, East Cowes. Saunders added a pottery in 1926, renaming the business to the 'Carisbrooke Brick, Tile and Pottery Works'. Samuel Saunders appointed two experienced potters - Edward Bagley, who had previously worked for the Watcombe Pottery, Devon and William Baker who had previously worked at the Upchurch Pottery. Samuel Saunder's pottery was made using local red clay and was usually simple in design, often categorised as Art Deco. The business was later expanded and renamed to the Isle of Wight Handcraft Pottery, with the produce carrying a unique double 'S’ mark on their base, identifying the owner Sam Saunders. Examples of this pottery are held at the nearby Carisbrooke Castle museum. The pottery side of the business was closed in 1938, after the pottery manager was caught stealing from the company.

At the moment, it is unclear when exactly the brickworks closed down. It was certainly trading up to 1942, but at some point during the war, the site started to be used as an agricultural machinery depot by the war agricultural executive committee. In 1947, a severe gale blew the roof off of one of the depot's sheds onto the adjoining railway line, which had to be cleared before the next train passed, half an hour later.

In 1955, the site was recorded as being used as a machinery depot by the Ministry of Agriculture. It seems likely that control of the site would have transferred directly from the first government body to the second. In 1956, auctioneers were called in to sell all of the agricultural machinery still stored there, as its use as a depot came to an end. By 1957, the site seems to have completely closed, with the Gunville Brickworks being used as "an approved dumping site" for the spoil from excavations for a new school.

The last remaining part of Gunville Brickworks was the imposing 100-foot high chimney, which was demolished in July 1981 to make way for a new low-cost housing development at Alvington Manor View. The privilege of blowing it up was given as a prize in a fund-raising competition organised by Newport Round Table, whose fund-raising chairman was managing director of Quadet Construction, who were to build the estate. The lucky prize winner, who was a three-year-old girl, also received £50. The winning ticket was drawn by Mr Stephen Ross MP from 13,000 entries with the £1,000 raised going towards sending an Island team for the first time to the Mini Olympics for the disabled in Lowestoft, later in the year.

The brickworks at Rookley was the last one left on the Island, closing in 1974.

=== Steam Railway (demolished) ===
The main railway line from Freshwater to Newport ran through Gunville, with work on the 12-mile stretch starting in 1886 and completed in 1888. The line progressed eastward through Yarmouth, north of Thorley, Wellow, Newbridge and Calbourne, Gunville and to Newport. Apart from the main stations at Freshwater and Yarmouth, there were miniature stations at Ningwood, Calbourne & Shalfleet, and Carisbrooke. There was also Watchingwell station, which was originally reserved for only the private use of Sir John Barrington Simeon MP, the owner of Swainston Manor. However, it was eventually opened up for public use as well.

In 1899, a public railway siding (see the image of Gunville Brickworks above) was opened alongside Gunville Brickworks for goods, mineral and live-stock traffic, with direct access from Gunville Road. Its use included that by the Brickworks as well as for transporting building materials and coal, with a coal business being based on the site. In August 1904, the siding was extended. The line passed under Gunville Road through a bridge, where Alvington Manor View now joins Gunville Road. It continued on in an easterly direction through Carisbrooke and into Newport.

British Railways finally closed the line in 1953, before the widespread nationwide closures of 1966, which resulted from the Beeching Report. The reason for the closure of the Freshwater to Newport line was simply that it never made very much money, with its original owners, the Isle of Wight Central Railway being actually made bankrupt in 1923. The line was then absorbed by the Southern Railway, who continued to operate it until its 1953 closure.

Gunville Bridge was demolished in 1967, mainly to enable Gunville Road to be widened and improved. With the bottleneck that the bridge caused removed, the road could be given a consistent width of 22 feet and it was also lowered by two feet, to remove a dangerous hump in the road. The improvement was said to be long overdue. Around that time, the line and the railway cutting were also being used as a place to dump earth from local construction projects, such as these roadworks on Gunville Road. Nowadays, after the subsequent construction of housing estates on both sides of Gunville Road, there are no signs left whatsoever that there was ever a bridge or a railway line running through the centre of Gunville.

=== John Dennett, rocket inventor ===
A rescue from a stricken ship, by using life-saving rocket apparatus.

John Dennett, together with his son Horatio, from one of the most noteworthy families of the Gunville area, being a rocket inventor, who manufactured his rockets in a workshop in Gunville Lane. Whilst little is known about John's early life, he was born on 25 September 1780, with his family established in the Carisbrooke area. At one time, he described himself as being an engineer and surveyor of "New Village, in the Isle of Wight". New Village, was a "street of genteel and comfortable houses" around The Mall/Castle Road district, laying between Newport and Carisbrooke. The name now being virtually forgotten, as the two larger towns inevitably absorbed all of the smaller villages around them.

It is thought likely that Dennett started making military rockets and mortars for use in the Napoleonic Wars, but what he became famous for was the development of life-saving rockets, for use at sea. Fired with a line attached, a strong rope could then be hauled from ship-to-shore or ship-to-ship, establishing a means of bringing survivors of stricken vessels to safety. By 1826, he was experimenting with these rockets, with his designs capable of carrying a line more than 300 yards, even against strong winds. This then made them very successful, as it is thought to be a much greater distance than the majority of shipwrecks were from the shore. Over the years, he refined and perfected these rockets.

In 1832, a Dennett rocket was used to rescue 19 seamen at Atherfield on the island, from the wreck of the 430-ton vessel Bainbridge, laying stricken on rocks. Four unsuccessful attempts had been made to secure a line over the ship by firing a conventional Manby Mortar, failing due to the great distance (nearly 500 yards). However, a single Dennett's rocket was then used, saving the day and earning John Dennett national media coverage. One of the saved passengers wrote of John Dennett, "I consider you as the instrument, under Almighty God, by which the lives of all on board have been preserved." Eminent witnesses to the event wrote at the time to testify of the "demonstrated superiority of the Island rocket" and the "most perfect and beautiful manner in which communication between the shore and the ship was established by one of Mr Dennett's rockets, which, in defiance of the wind, went directly over the midships the very first fire." The crew also showed their appreciation "in earnest of their deliverance, giving three cheers, which were as rapturously re-echoed by the people on shore." Over the succeeding years, John Dennett's rockets were used in many more rescues, all around the British coast.

In 1837, the Board of Customs ordered the comparative testing of both Dennett's rocket and Manby's mortar. It took seven men to carry the mortar and 15 minutes to set it up. But with a full load of gunpowder, it could only achieve a distance of 228 yards. Dennett's rocket required just two men to carry it and 4 minutes to set it up, never failing to fire less than 310 yards and was found to be far more accurate. In 1851, census records show that Dennett was living in Carisbrooke Castle, having been given the honour of being made custodian, by Queen Victoria.

In January 1843, the brig George of Sunderland, bound for the West Indies, foundered on the rocks off Atherfield. Ten men were saved by the rocket, although the Captain and ship's mate had already been washed overboard and drowned, mainly as a result of being drunk when the ship hit the rocks.

By 1853, having proven its worth many times and been shown to be far superior to the Manby Mortar, due to its greater accuracy and being able to fire much further, the Dennett rocket was adopted by 120 stations around the UK coast.

In January 1890, six people lost their lives when the 2,248-ton steel-built full-rigged ship Irex ran ashore on her maiden voyage "under stress of weather" in Scratchell's Bay, off of The Needles Batteries. She was carrying 3,600 tons of sewerage pipes to Rio de Janeiro. Due to the weather, the lifeboat was unable to reach the Irex and after twenty minutes of rowing, it had to give up and was towed away by the outward-bound steam collier Hampshire. When Dennett's rocket apparatus arrived and was set up by the Freshwater Bay Life Saving Apparatus Company on the downs outside the Needles Fort, its first shot sent a rope clear over the fore yardarm, 400 feet away. Twenty-nine crew were saved by hauling them from the ship's mast to the cliff top by Breeches buoy.

On 27 August 1946, members of the Isle of Wight coastal Life Saving Association saved six occupants of the wrecked Islay Mist, in a daring rescue off of the Freshwater Bay cliffs, during which one of the twenty rescuers was killed. The rescue was described as a "grand job of work." Ladders and ropes had to be lowered from the cliff top, allowing the rescuers to descend and enabling them to fire a rescue rocket over the Islay Mist. Tributes were paid to the rocket inventor, John Dennett.

There is an account about the surprise that more is not known of John Dennett, expressing "If, instead of being a Mercy-winged messenger of hope and deliverance to souls in peril of the sea, it had been some new device for more surely and speedily annihilating a Fleet and sending countless human beings to their death-doom, national honours would have been heaped upon the inventor."

On page 3,781 of the 1906 edition of the Harmsworth Encyclopaedia it is claimed that Dennett rockets are known to have saved 8,515 lives between 1870 and 1905.

John Dennett died in 1852, leaving his son Horatio to carry on the family business. As well as working on rockets, Horatio was also working in 1878 as a brick manufacturer in Carisbrooke, showing that he too, was working in the Gunville area, probably around the site of the Alvington and Gunville Brickworks. The Dennett rockets were manufactured in three wooden buildings on an isolated site to the west of Gunville Lane.

Horatio died in 1897 and is buried next to his father in the cemetery at St Mary's Church, Carisbrooke. There ends the story of two relatively unknown, but very influential local men who were responsible for the development of life-saving equipment that is still in use today; and for saving the lives of many, many people.

=== St Augustine's Leper Hospital ===
The first hospital on the Isle of Wight was the Leper Hospital at Gunville in the 13th century. It was maintained by ″St Mary's″ Priory at Carisbrooke and treatment was administered by the monks. Isabella de Fortibus made a regular allowance of one silver mark a year for the hospital. This is known from the Charter of Liberties, that of Isabella de Fortibus, written between 1262 and 1280.

Whilst marked on early maps, no one is completely sure any more where the ruins of the hospital actually were, but they were on land to the east of Gunville Road, on land known as Priory Fields, somewhere between Gunville Bridge and Kitbridge. In 1945, there was said to be an old stone in the field, marking the spot.

=== Gunville Harbour ===
Gunville has of course never had a harbour, being in the centre of the Island and away from any major rivers. However, this 'joking' name arose in the past, due to the local Bennett family who made model sailing yachts for many years in Gunville for a living. Edward William Bennett, "Model yacht maker", was in charge of the business in 1898 and had a workshop in Gunville, which was still open in 1914.

The Bennetts were often seen testing their boats on the ponds of Gunville, which over time became known as Gunville Harbour. In 1900, a small girl almost drowned in the 'harbour' and the Carisbrooke Parish Council subsequently ruled that protective fencing needed to be erected there.

Edward Bennett died in 1938 at the age of 79 and is buried in Carisbrooke Cemetery.

=== Death by cold-water ===
In 1824, it was reported in the Hampshire Chronicle that a poor man of Gunville had died as a result of drinking cold water on the day before, at a time when he was very warm.

=== The Gunville Whirlwind ===
Whilst few details are now known, in August 1948 a great whirlwind struck Gunville. Worst hit was a local market gardener, whose business was largely destroyed. However, to get him back on his feet, he was awarded a grant of £140 from the Lord Mayor's Fund, from Newport Mayor and Rotarian, Mr A E King.

=== The Gunville Meteorite ===
In September 1960, a large meteorite is thought to have landed in a field behind 127 Gunville Road. The owner reported seeing a huge blue flame which seemed to envelope the neighbourhood, followed by a deafening explosion, which was said to be three times as loud as any clap of thunder that he had ever heard. In the field behind Priory Boys' School there was found to be a crater which was three feet across and nine inches deep, with a smaller hole in the centre. The police were called, who found two more holes which were the diameter of tennis balls, but ran to a depth of four feet through the clay. The holes were said to have been made by white-hot objects, thought to be meteorite fragments.
