= The Tourist (train) =

Railway service on the Isle of Wight, England

The Tourist was a train run by the Southern Railway on the railway lines of the Isle of Wight. It was set up in 1933 as an extension of the original East and West Through Train from the previous year. It was the only named train on the Isle of Wight, and one of the very few express trains.

The original East-West train started from Shanklin, then called at Sandown, Merstone, Newport, Carisbrooke and Yarmouth before terminating at Freshwater. A change of locomotive was needed at Newport as the Newport-Freshwater line's bridges could not take the weight of a locomotive other than the A1 "Terrier" class. When extended as The Tourist the train started from Ventnor but a locomotive change was still required. By 1934, it called at Wroxall before Shanklin, but the stops at Merstone and Carisbrooke were removed. As bridges were also strengthened to allow the LSWR O2 Class to haul the train throughout, the train was now much faster, completing the full journey in 1 hour and 17 minutes.

The train was withdrawn for the duration of World War II, but resumed immediately on VE Day. However, by September 1953 the line from Newport to Yarmouth and Freshwater was closed, spelling the end for The Tourist.

== Sources ==
- Allen, PC; MacLeod, AB (1986). Rails in the Isle of Wight (2 ed.). Newton Abbot: David & Charles. ISBN 0-7153-8701-4.
