= Newport railway station (Freshwater, Yarmouth and Newport Railway) =

Disused railway station in Isle of Wight, UK

Newport FYN

General information
- Location: Isle of Wight; England
- Coordinates: 50.7032°N 1.2942°W
- Grid reference: SZ499895
- Platforms: 1

Other information
- Status: Disused

History
- Pre-grouping: Freshwater, Yarmouth and Newport Railway1888-1923
- Post-grouping: Southern Railway

Key dates
- 1 July 1913: Opened
- 1 August 1923: Closed
Location

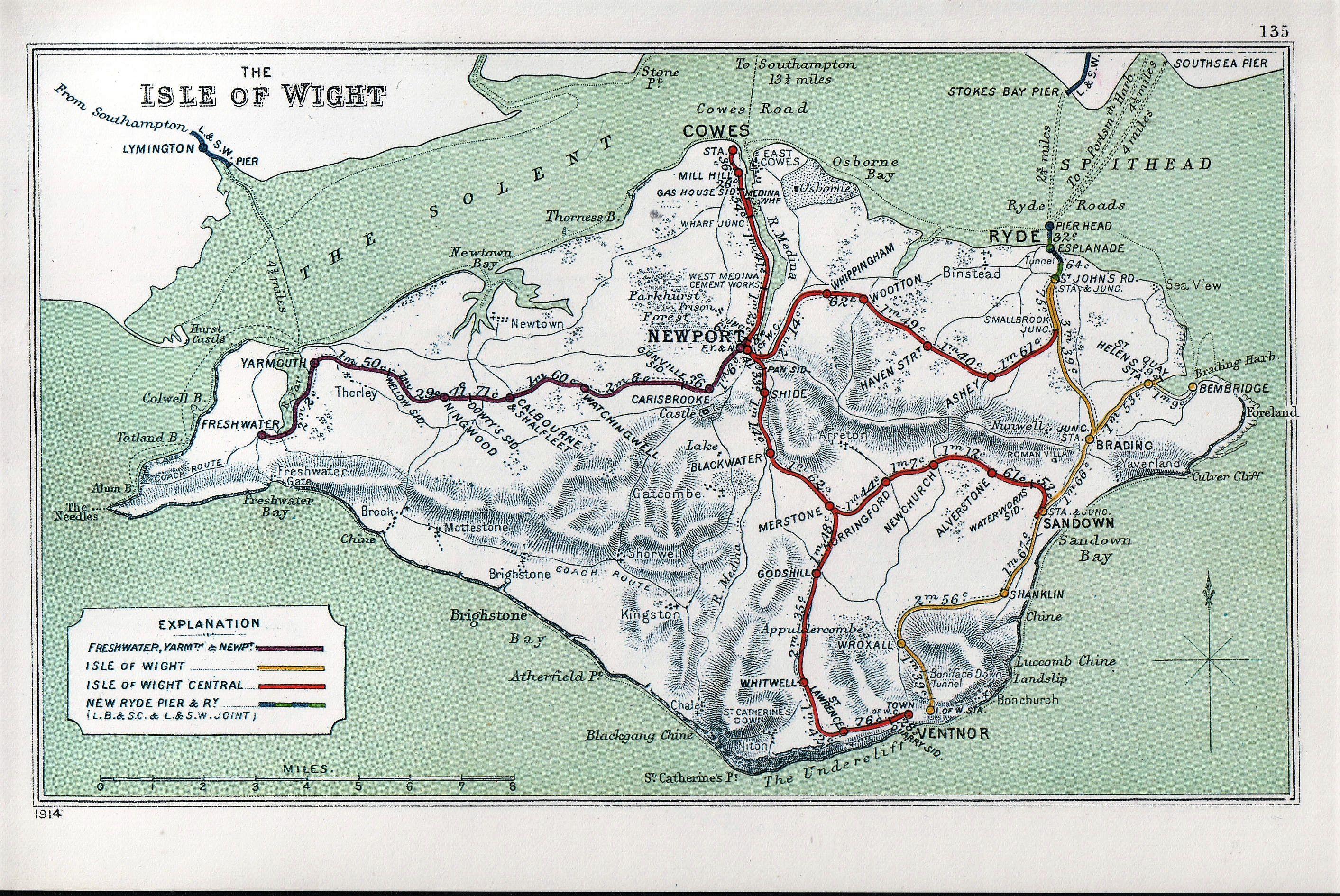
A 1914 Railway Clearing House map of lines around The Isle of Wight.

Newport FYN railway station was a railway station at Newport, Isle of Wight, off the south coast of England. For ten years it was the alternative terminus of the Freshwater, Yarmouth and Newport Railway. (Note: Originally incorporated on 26 August 1880 and run out of the original Newport station from 10 September 1888)

== History ==
The station opened on 1 July 1913 after a conflict between the FYN and the Isle of Wight Central Railway, and closed 10 years later on the creation of the Southern, when Freshwater trains reverted to using Newport's main station. During its inauspicious existence passengers had a short inconvenient walk between the two rival termini. Any trace of the station has long since gone.

== Stationmaster ==
William Oliver Bennett, the station master at Ningwood, was appointed in 1913 and stayed in post until 1924 when he transferred to Littleham.

== See also ==
- List of closed railway stations in Britain

Preceding station	Disused railways	Following station
Terminus	Freshwater, Yarmouth and Newport Railway	Carisbrooke
