= Railways on the Isle of Wight =

Railways

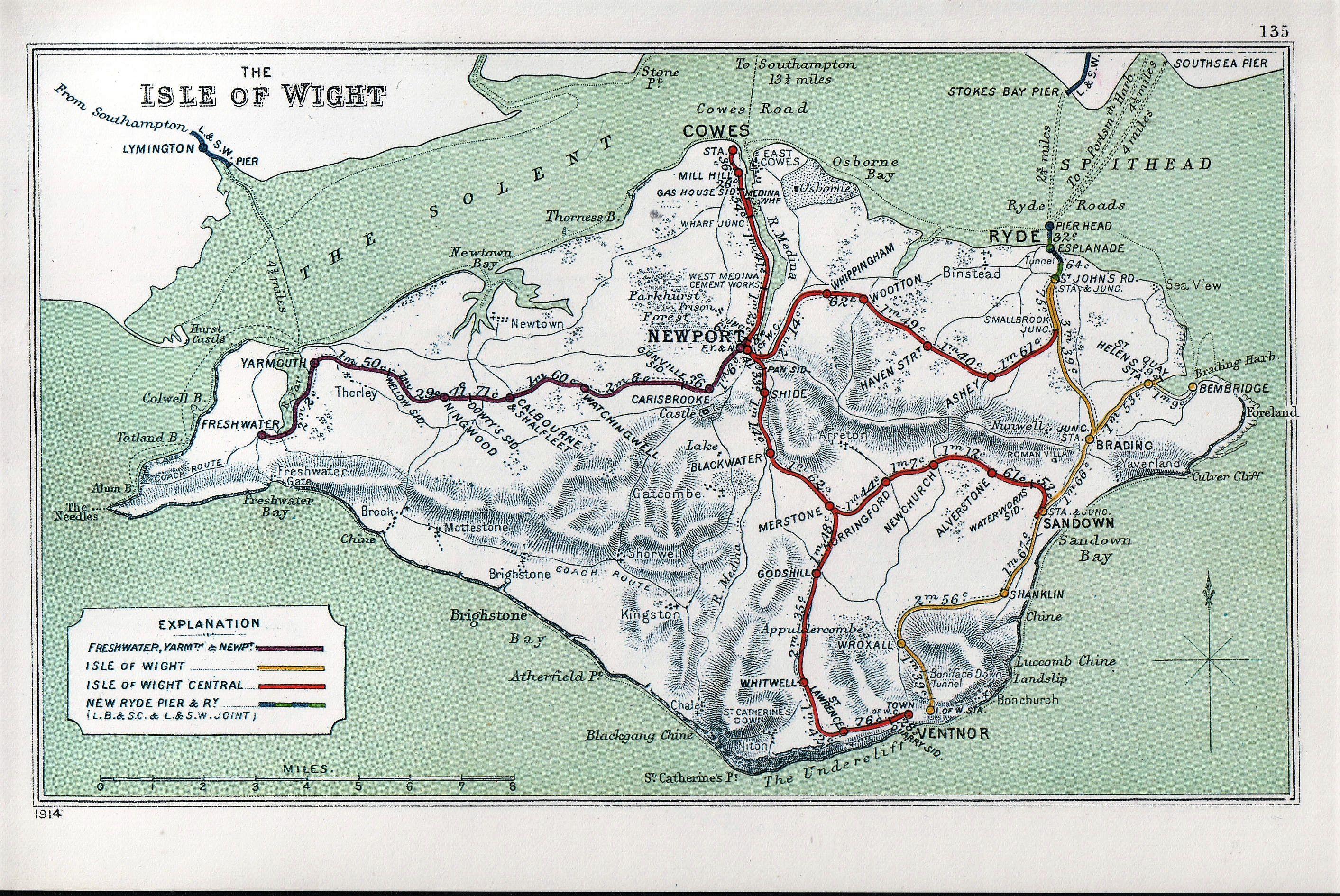
A 1914 Railway Clearing House map of all railway lines on the Isle of Wight.

There once existed a 55 1/2-mile (89.3 km) network of railway lines on the Isle of Wight, which operated both as a self-contained railway network, and as links to ferry services between the island and the South coast of Great Britain. The routes were opened by several companies between 1862 and 1901 and modernised after The Grouping in the 1920s. Most of them were permanently closed between 1952 and 1966, whilst the 8 1/2-mile-long (13.7 km) Island Line was temporarily closed in 1966 and rebuilt for electric train services, introduced in 1967. Replacement trains were introduced in 1990, and again in 2021 along with a major renewal of the line. A further 5 1/2 miles (8.9 km) have reopened as a heritage line known as the Isle of Wight Steam Railway and there have been several proposals to expand the network further since the 1960s, either with conventional heavy rail or by conversion to light rail.

== Early beginnings ==
The first railway to be built on the island ran for a distance of 2,500 yards (2,300 m). It was opened in 1833 on the Nash Estate near Yarmouth. Its usage is presumed to have been for transporting brickmaking materials to and from a jetty on the Solent, and it is not thought to have used mechanical traction. The line is now abandoned.

== The independent companies ==
The first conventional railway line to open on the island was that from Cowes to Newport. The Cowes and Newport Railway Company began construction of the line in 1859 after the Cowes and Newport (Isle of Wight) Railway Act 1859 (22 & 23 Vict. c. xciv) was passed earlier that year. The line opened to passengers in June 1862.

Shortly after this, the Isle of Wight Railway (IWR) company built its initial line from Ryde to Shanklin, opening in 1864. Also in 1864, horse-drawn trams began running along Ryde Pier, connecting ferry services to the town. The IWR opened an extension of its main line to reach Ventnor in 1866. In 1871, the Ryde tramway was extended to meet the railway line at Ryde St John's Road.

The Ryde and Newport Railway opened in December 1875, with operations controlled by the Cowes & Newport company.

In 1875, the Isle of Wight (Newport Junction) Railway opened the main part of its 10-mile Sandown to Newport line, planned in 1868. It would have opened sooner, but failed official inspections. In February 1875, the line was opened between Shide, a suburb of Newport, and the IWR station at Sandown. Eight months later the line was extended a further half-mile to reach Pan Lane. However, the final half-mile from there to Newport station did not open until 1879. Four years of poor connections in Newport meant not enough passengers or freight had been attracted to the line, and the company passed into receivership in 1880. At this point, it was bought by the Cowes & Newport/Ryde & Newport company, who were legally renamed as the Isle of Wight Central Railway (IWCR).

In 1877 the London, Brighton and South Coast Railway and London and South Western Railway were granted an Act of Parliament to extend Ryde Pier, building a railway line from the pier head to St John's Road. This was completed in 1880, and at this point the Ryde tramway was shortened to simply run along the pier.

In 1882, the IWR opened a branch line from Brading to Bembridge, serving a large natural harbour between Bembridge and St Helen's stations. A short-lived train ferry from Bembridge Harbour to the Hayling Island branch line also started at this point.

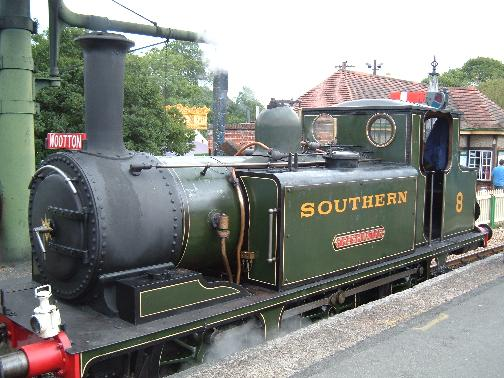
A1 'Terrier' class locomotive Freshwater in Southern Railway livery at the Isle of Wight Steam Railway. This locomotive was transferred to the island in 1913 by the FYN.

In 1889, the Freshwater, Yarmouth and Newport Railway (FYN) opened its 12-mile line from Newport to Freshwater, the only line to run west of Newport. Services on its line were operated by the IWCR under a mutual agreement.

The network was completed by the Newport, Godshill and St Lawrence Railway's Ventnor West Branch line from Merstone, on the Sandown-Newport line, to St Lawrence on the south coast. This was opened in 1897, and extended to Ventnor West in June 1900. This line, the last to be built on the island, was taken over by the Isle of Wight Central.

By the end of 1900, a total of 55½ miles of railway covered the island, including railway lines on Ryde Pier (but excluding the pier tramway). Freight services were largely limited to coal, and most of the income for the island's railway companies came from passenger tickets, whose sales varied significantly between the busy summer season and the relative quiet of winter.

A fixed railway link to the mainland was authorised by Parliament in 1903. The South West and Isle of Wight Junction Railway was a joint project between the London & South Western Railway and the FYN. The excavation of a two and a half-mile long tunnel was approved in 1903, 1904 and 1909. However, the tunnel project was abandoned due to the outbreak of the First World War in 1914.

As mentioned above, the IWCR and FYN had an agreement whereby the IWCR would provide the train service along the FYN line. However, in 1913 this agreement deteriorated to the point that the FYN was forced to purchase its own locomotives and rolling stock.

== Southern Railway ==
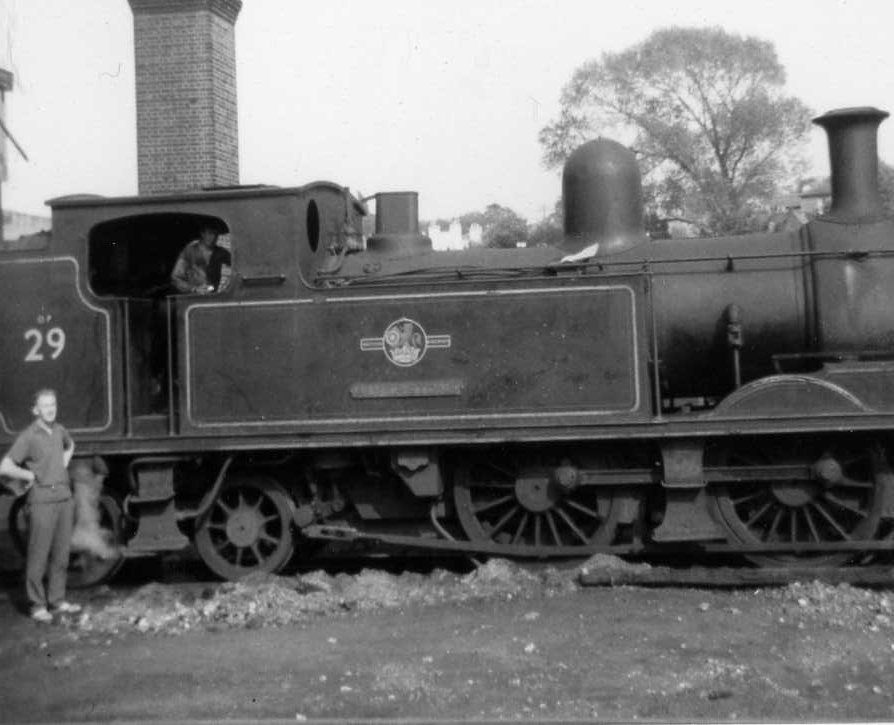
LSWR O2 class locomotive W29 Alverstone (in 1965 BR livery). 23 were brought to the island by the Southern Railway.

After the Railways Act 1921 came into force from January 1923, the Southern Railway took over all lines on the island, although the integration of the FYN took some time due to financial wrangling. The company set about significant investment in the island's rail services, primarily through replacing old locomotives and carriages. Twenty-three O2 class locomotives were transferred to the island from the former London and South Western Railway's suburban services, and many coaches were brought from the former London, Chatham and Dover Railway and London, Brighton and South Coast Railway. The locomotives were given numbers under an unusual system where each number was individual only on the island. Each locomotive officially carried its number with a W-prefix to indicate this, and was given a nameplate relating to somewhere on the island (e.g. W 24—Calbourne).

The Southern also carried out changes in track layout to make services more flexible, such as the installation of double track from Brading to Sandown, new passing loops at Havenstreet and Wroxall stations, and pointwork at Smallbrook Junction. A new named train called The Tourist was set up, running from Ventnor to Freshwater via Sandown, Merstone and Newport. It was the only named train on the island, and travelled on lines from all the former Isle of Wight railway companies.

== Nationalisation, privatisation and preservation ==
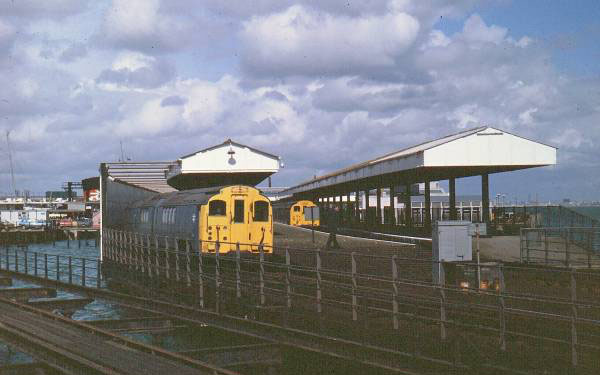
Class 486 & 485 trains introduced by British Rail in 1967, seen at the then recently remodelled Ryde Pier Head.

In 1948, the railways of the United Kingdom, including those on the island, were nationalised as British Railways. Under separate modernisation schemes, the FYN line, Ventnor West line, Bembridge branch and Sandown to Newport line had closed by the end of 1956. In 1966, under the recommendations of the Beeching Report, services were withdrawn on the Ryde to Newport and Cowes lines, and between Shanklin and Ventnor.

The line between Ryde and Shanklin was also earmarked for closure by Beeching, but the TUCC stated that this would cause severe hardship and the Minister of Transport refused consent, so management decided to authorise electrification instead. This remaining Ryde-Shanklin line was electrified using the third rail system and Class 485 and Class 486 trains, which had previously worked on the London Underground. The new electric service began in March 1967.

In 1971, the Isle of Wight Steam Railway began operating on part of the Ryde to Newport line. Their operation extended to reach 5½ miles in 1991, and they are now focused on restoring their substantial fleet of historic carriages.

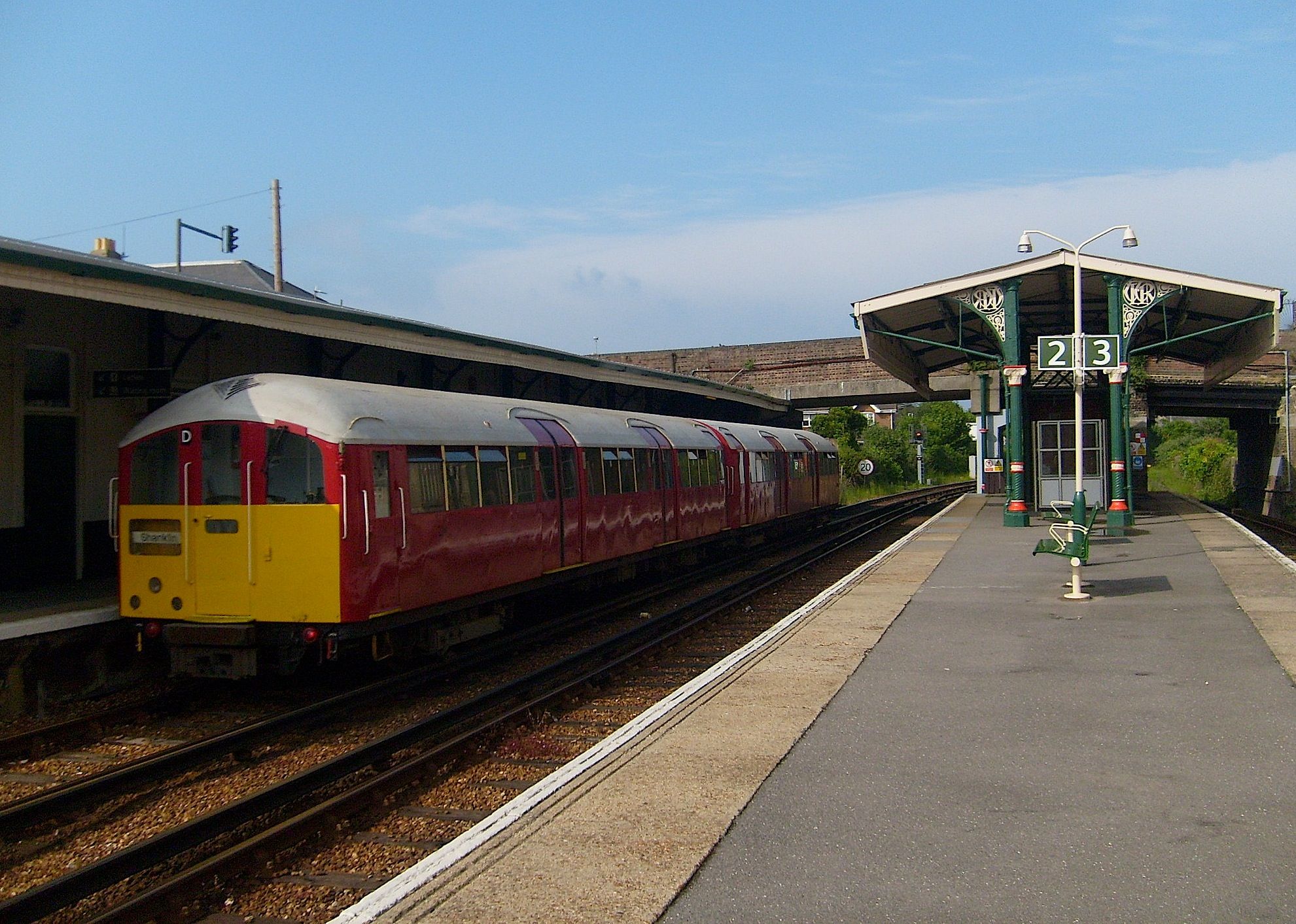
Class 483 train introduced in 1990, seen at St John's Road in 2007.

In 1990, the newer fleet of Class 483 trains replaced the older electric units on the Ryde-Shanklin line. The line and passenger services were branded as Island Line (replacing the former RydeRail brand), and in 1996 the passenger service was privatised as the Island Line franchise, which was absorbed into the South Western franchise in 2007. Since then, electric services on the line have continued to run under the name Island Line Trains. The route is unique within the UK's franchised rail network in being vertically integrated - while Network Rail own the Island Line's infrastructure, it is leased out to the operator who is therefore responsible for everyday maintenance of the track and immediate foundations as well as the trains that run on it.

=== Fate of the abandoned lines ===
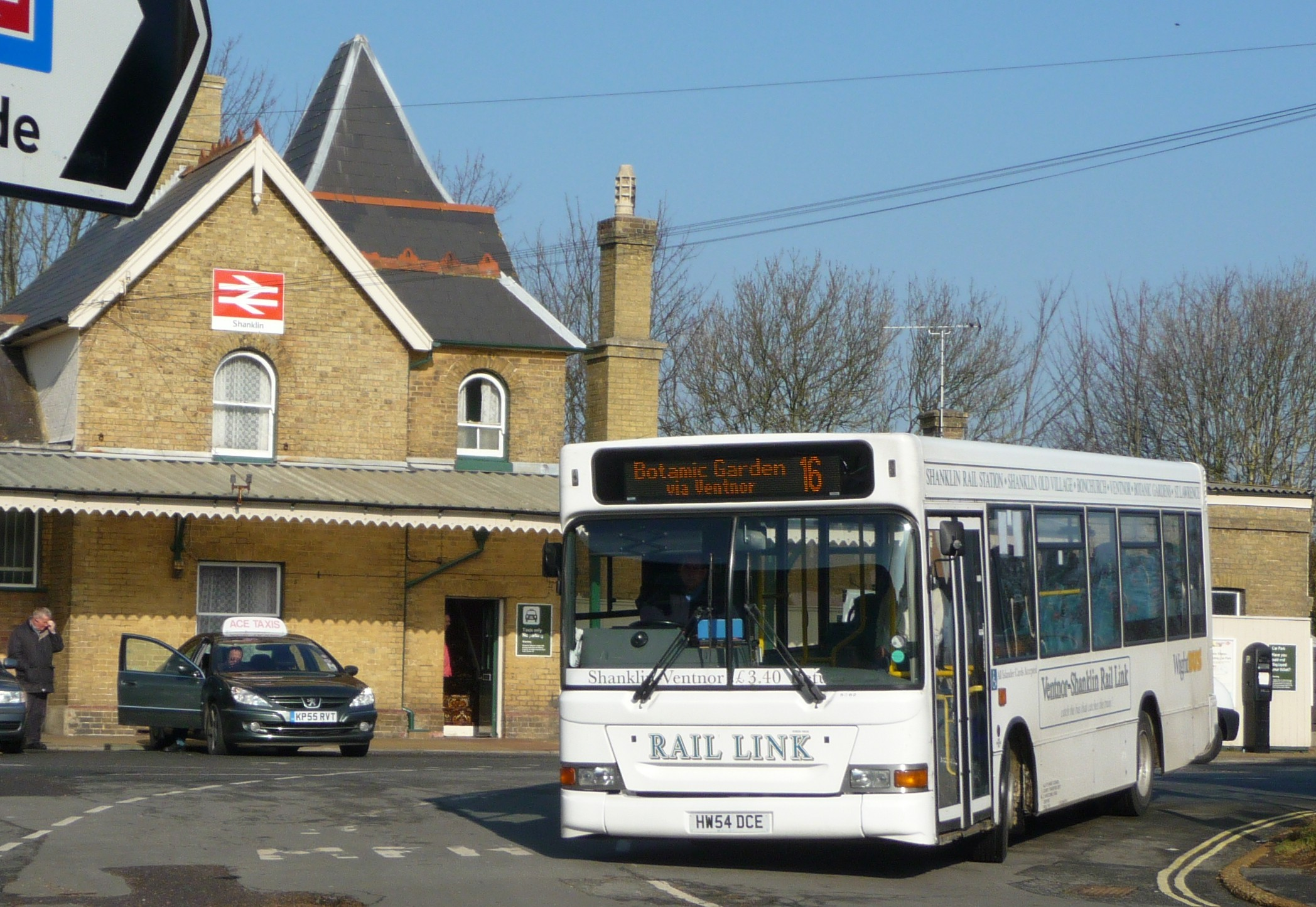
The former Wightbus Rail Link leaving Shanklin towards Ventnor in 2010.

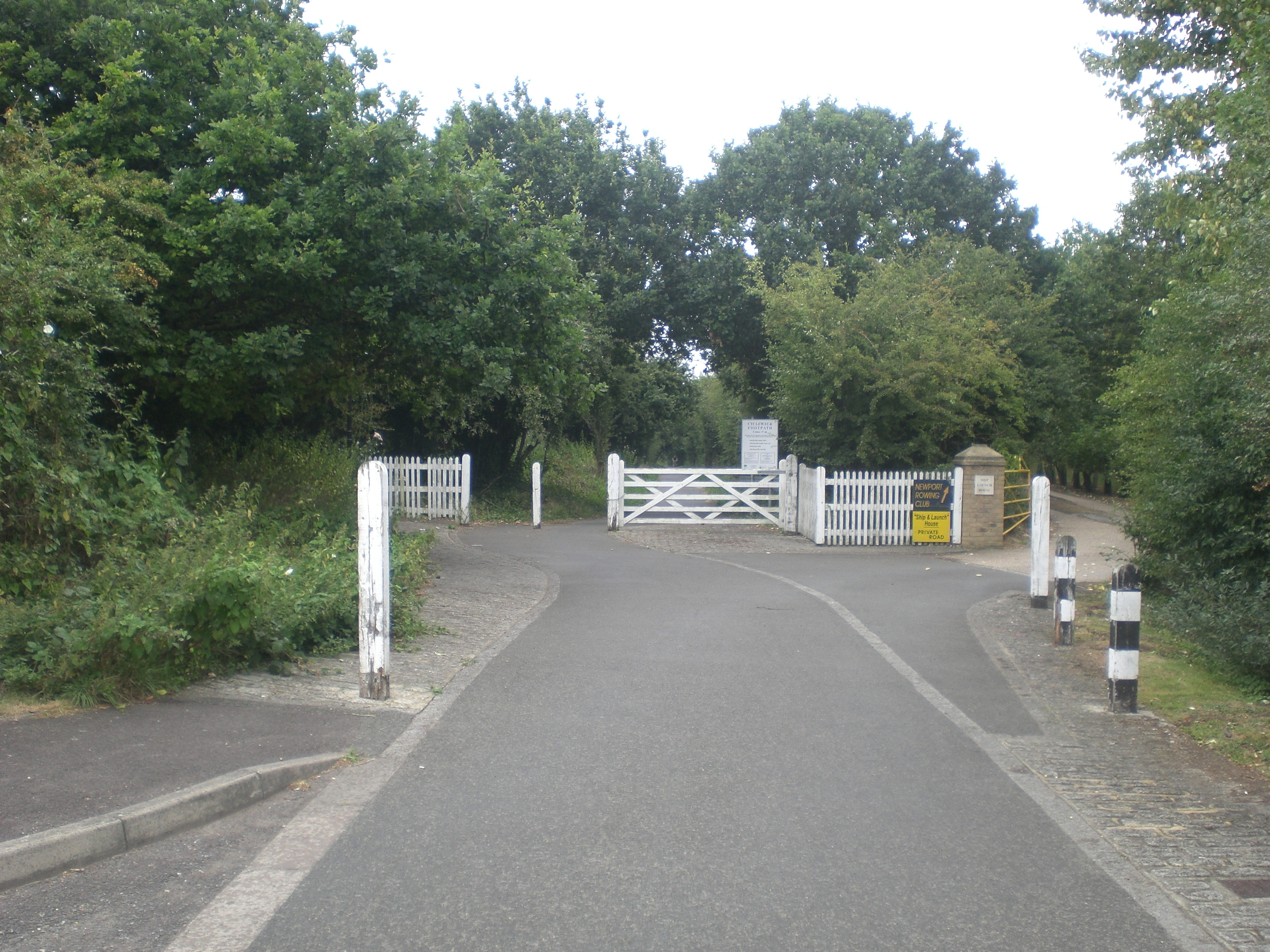
Trackbed of Cowes line leaving Newport. It is now a cycle route.

Many of the railway lines abandoned between 1952 and 1966 have found other uses. The tunnel between St Lawrence and Whitwell was until recently home to a mushroom farm, while the one from Ventnor to Wroxall is now used to collect and transport Ventnor's water supply. From 2004 Ventnor and St Lawrence were served by the Ventnor Rail Link bus from Shanklin, although this was withdrawn in 2010 after decisions by the Isle of Wight Council about the funding of Wightbus. Newport railway station was completely demolished in 1971 to make way for an upgrade of the A3054 road. Several parts of the network have been turned into "rail trail" cyclepaths, and notably the island's section of National Cycle Route 23 was constructed mainly on the former Sandown-Newport-Cowes line of the Isle of Wight Central Railway.

== The future ==
In August 2017, the franchise was taken over by South Western Railway, who maintained the Island Line name. On 16 September 2019 it was confirmed that a £26 million investment into the Isle of Wight's railways would mean 5 class 484 units would replace the ageing class 483s, which had become unreliable to the point that services on the line had to be halved in frequency for around a month. The new trains were built by Vivarail as third-rail units using D78 Stock bodyshells, and island-based stakeholders including the Isle of Wight Council and Solent Local Enterprise Partnership contributed £1 million to fund reinstatement of a long-removed passing loop at Brading to allow services to run at half-hourly intervals. Network Rail have also agreed to fund £5 million of upgrade work on Ryde Pier to secure the line's future, as failure to do so would be terminal to the line's operation. The first of the Class 484 trains were due to arrive on the line in the summer of 2020, although this was delayed until September due to the coronavirus pandemic.

Most of the work on the track took place over the winter of 2020–2021, with a "shuttle" train service operated during this period. A full service using only the new trains and running to a 30-minute frequency began in May 2021.

The island's MP has also expressed an interest with the Department for Transport for feasibility studies to re-open routes between Wooton and Newport, and between Shanklin and Ventnor. The idea of extending Island Line services back to Ventnor was first considered in 1967, but has been previously dismissed due to the need to reclaim the tunnel under Ventnor Downs from Southern Water and some other sections of the former route having been built upon. The Isle of Wight Steam Railway have a long-term aspiration to return trains to Newport, but responded to the proposal by stating that " this has significant financial and technical challenges" and that while they have no current plans to extend Westward, they are open to discussing how to overcome the challenges.

Numerous other plans have been suggested for the island's rail system, including:

- the extension of steam services from Smallbrook Junction to Ryde St John's Road station
- conversion of the Island Line to a tramway and extending into Shanklin town centre
- extension of the Island Line to Gosport, Hampshire via a new Solent tunnel
