= Freshwater, Yarmouth and Newport Railway =

Defunct railway of England

The Freshwater, Yarmouth and Newport Railway was a railway line on the Isle of Wight, United Kingdom, connecting Freshwater and Yarmouth to Newport. It was intended to connect the thinly populated west of the island, and it opened in 1889. At Newport it relied on the existing Isle of Wight Central Railway's station, but trains entering it had to shunt back from the junction. The IoWCR worked the line until 1913.

The line was never commercially successful, and a break with the IoWCR in 1913 obliged the FY&NR hastily to build its own Newport station and acquire locomotives and rolling stock while in receivership.

After the Southern Railway absorbed the FY&NR in 1923, the SR developed holiday traffic, but it was highly seasonal and the heavy losses resulted in the line's closure in 1953.

== Concept and construction ==
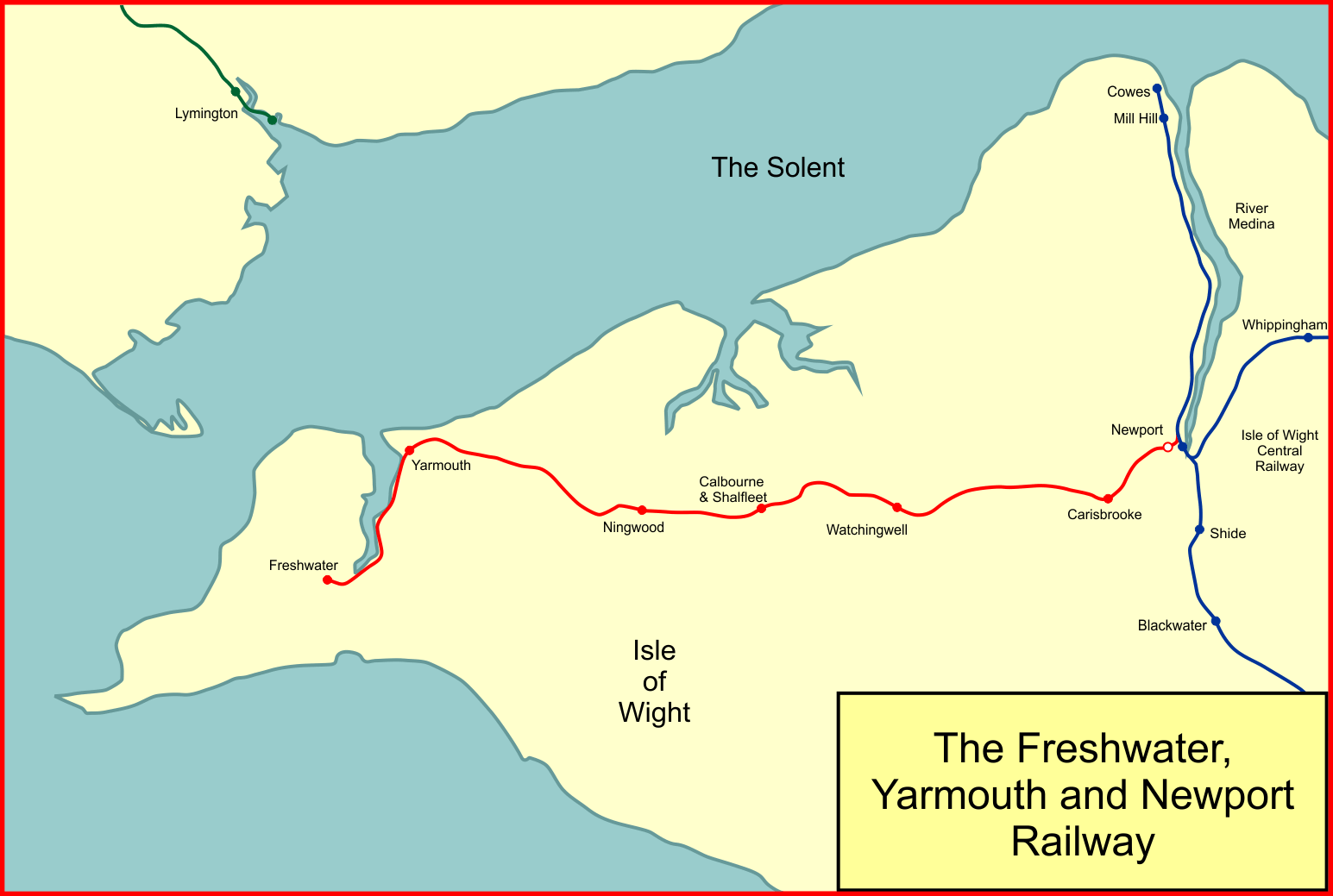
System map of the Freshwater, Yarmouth and Newport Railway

By 1880 the Isle of Wight was well supplied with railways in its eastern and northern areas, connecting Ryde with Newport and Cowes, and Ryde and Newport with Sandown and Ventnor. The more beautiful, but more thinly-populated west was untouched. Newport was the industrial centre on the island, and its geographical position on the River Medina made it a natural connection point. The Cowes and Newport Railway had a junction station there.

In 1868 a Bouldnor, Yarmouth and Freshwater Railway was proposed, but it did not proceed. In 1872 a Freshwater, Bouldnor and Newport Railway was promoted; Bouldnor is a hamlet a mile or so east of Yarmouth; this venture was unsuccessful.

Freshwater, Yarmouth and Newport Railway Act 1880
- Act of Parliament
- Parliament of the United Kingdom
- Long title: An Act for incorporating the Freshwater, Yarmouth, and Newport Railway Company; and for other purposes.
- Citation: 43 & 44 Vict. c. clxxxvi

Dates
- Royal assent: 26 August 1880

Text of statute as originally enacted

A parliamentary bill was submitted for a line connecting Freshwater and Newport, and this received royal assent as the Freshwater, Yarmouth and Newport Railway Act 1880 (43 & 44 Vict. c. clxxxvi) on 26 August 1880, authorising the Freshwater, Yarmouth and Isle of Wight Railway. Share capital was £100,000. The new company was encouraged by support from the London and South Western Railway, which operated a ferry service from Lymington on the mainland to Yarmouth. There were many wealthy residents in the area to be served, and some also expressed support for a railway which, they believed, would facilitate their journeys to the mainland.

Freshwater, Yarmouth and Newport Railway Act 1883
- Act of Parliament
- Parliament of the United Kingdom
- Long title: An Act to extend the time for the completion of the Freshwater Yarmouth and Newport Railway and for the purchase of land therefor; to authorise the Freshwater Yarmouth and Newport Railway Company to raise additional capital and for other purposes.
- Citation: 46 & 47 Vict. c. cxcvi

Dates
- Royal assent: 20 August 1883

Text of statute as originally enacted

The line was surveyed between 1883 and 1885, a second act of Parliament, the Freshwater, Yarmouth and Newport Railway Act 1883 (46 & 47 Vict. c. cxcvi) of 20 August 1883 was passed having authorised a further £42,000 of share capital. Construction started in 1886. The relaxed pace of events indicates a serious failure to generate share subscription. (Note: Carter gives the authorised capital including 33% loans in both cases.)

The line was laid out so as to avoid major engineering works, at the expense of many curves and steep gradients; there was a trestle viaduct 576 feet (176 m) in length at Hunny Hill, Newport, and a concrete viaduct over the Newtown River. The line was constructed with passing loops at Carisbrooke, Ningwood and Yarmouth. The line was opened for goods traffic on 10 September 1888 and for passengers on 20 July 1889.

== Opening ==
An inaugural train was run on 10 August 1888 hauled by an 0-6-0 tank engine that had been used by the contractor constructing the line, and named Freshwater for the occasion. For this demonstration run the locomotive pulled a single mineral wagon fitted with seats. A revenue earning goods train ran from Newport to Freshwater with two wagons of coal on 1 September 1888.

Passenger operation had to be approved by the Board of Trade and Major General Hutchinson visited the line on 2 May 1889 to inspect it. Reservations were expressed about some of the works, and an undertaking was required from the company's board as to rectification; after some delay the approval was given, and a ceremonial opening took place on 11 July 1889, followed by a full public operation from 20 July 1889.

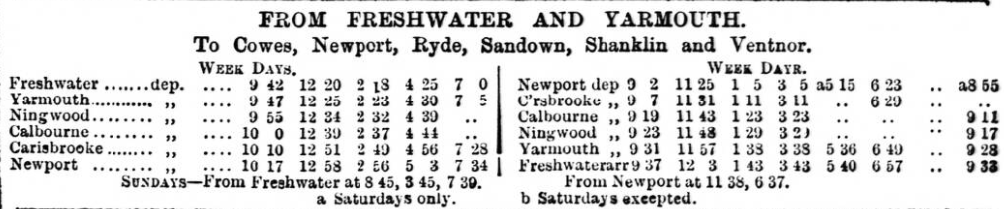
Timetable from the Isle of Wight Observer 9 May 1891

The line was worked by the Isle of Wight Central Railway for 53.625% of gross receipts, but the FY&NR remained responsible for maintenance of the infrastructure. The junction with the Cowes and Newport line was on the Cowes side of Newport station, and faced Cowes, so that the FY&NR trains running to Newport had to run round at the point of junction and run back to the station. (The Board had been required to give a formal undertaking that propelling without running round would not be carried out. After many years a dispensation was procured from the Board of Trade permitting propelling for the short distance between the junction and the station.)

== End of the working agreement ==
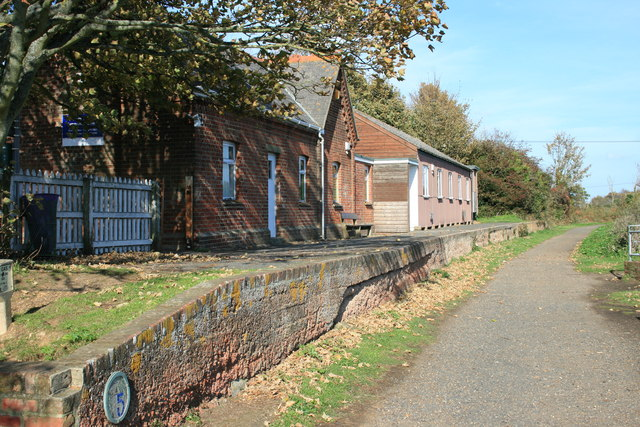
Yarmouth station in 2008

From the outset the working agreement between the FY&NR and the IoWCR was contentious, due to the supposed inadequacy of structures and earthworks, for which the IoWCR was unwilling to accept the liability. The IoWCR may have suggested that a third-party contractor take that responsibility, for the FY&NR wrote to the IoWCR stating that "the principle of our line being maintained by any other person than the working company is not feasible. We find that there is no such case in the whole railway systems of Great Britain."

Whether the FY&NR did the maintenance by direct labour or by contract, it was inadequate from the outset. There were also several disputes about charges for the use of stations. A further review of the working agreement in 1896 resulted in a 14-year arrangement, by which the IoWCR got 45% of traffic receipts.

In 1910 that agreement expired, and the IoWCR was once more concerned that renewal of the working agreement committed them to steeply rising expenditure due to life expiry of much of the original FY&NR equipment, and discussions took place over the future working charge. In 1911 an 18-month agreement was settled, in which the IoWCR took 75% of receipts, their obligation including most infrastructure maintenance. The FY&NR agreed but was unhappy, and sought advice from Sam Fay of the Great Central Railway, who had a residence on the island. Fay recommended that the FY&NR should work its own line, and the FY&NR decided to proceed on that basis, procuring some passenger coaches from the Manchester, South Junction and Altrincham Railway, then starting electric passenger services with new stock. The FY&NR gave notice that they would work their line from 1 July 1913, and that they would not use the IoWCR station at Newport (to avoid the toll for its use).

The FY&NR provided its own station, a short distance before the point of junction at Newport. Goods sidings too had to be provided there. White refers to the station as being "a small corrugated iron one" but he meant the booking office; the platform and the accommodation generally was remarkably extensive. The IoWCR had acquired additional passenger coaches under the 1911 agreement, and the FY&NR were obliged under that agreement to buy them on. They had to issue debenture stock to pay for them.

Blackburn & Mackett (1988) state:

Some accounts of the events leading to the break between the two companies imply that it was the IWCR who took the initiative by banning the Freshwater Company's trains from Newport station, and even that they forced the FYN to run its own services by refusing to work the line. No evidence could be found to support these views. On the contrary it appears that the FYN were entirely responsible for the break. Naturally there was some opposition from the Central, and Harry Willmott, who owned some FYN stock, tried to organise some of the other shareholders to veto the proposal to build another station at Newport, but was unable to get sufficient votes. It also appears that after the break the IWCR did all they could to facilitate the exchange of passengers, luggage and parcels between the two stations.

The engine power the FY&NR procured now consisted of two locomotives only, indicating the limited volume of traffic it was running. They were second-hand 0-6-0 tank engines, dating from 1902 and 1876. The 1902 locomotive, no. 1, was the youngest to work on the Island and one of only two built in the twentieth century. No. 2 was only fitted with the vacuum brake and consequently could only work one set of coaches, which were similarly fitted. No 1 was dual fitted. In addition an open-sided Drewry petrol railcar seating 12 passengers was obtained, working from 1 July 1913.

These expenditures pushed the FY&NR into insolvency almost immediately, and Fay was appointed by the receivers to manage the line, and in fact he assisted in getting hold of the rolling stock. Allen and MacLeod suggest that Fay's interest was in the possible Solent tunnel. In fact from this time the FY&NR was operated practically as a remote branch of the Great Central Railway.

The arrangement of the station, some considerable walking distance from the IoWCR station, was very inconvenient to through passengers changing trains at Newport. This resulted in complaints to the Railway and Canal Commissioners, who put pressure on the companies to ameliorate the situation, and from 1914 most FY&NR passenger trains resumed using the IoWCR station, although running beyond that point remained discontinued.

== A Solent tunnel ==
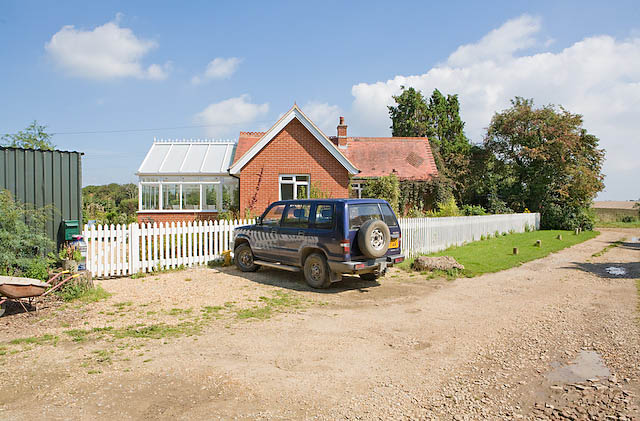
The former Watchingwell station building

In 1900 a proposal was put forward to construct a tunnel under the Solent connecting the FY&NR with the mainland network at Lymington. The idea got as far as an authorising act of Parliament, the South Western and Isle of Wight Junction Railway Act 1901 (1 Edw. 7. c. xcix), incorporating the South Western and Isle of Wight Junction Railway. Nothing came of the scheme, but it was revived in 1913 as a means of reviving the finances of the FY&NR. However raising the capital for the works was problematical, and the onset of World War I put paid to the idea.

It was suggested again after 1923, but at the time the Southern Railway had invested heavily in piers and ferryboats, and were opposed to the idea; the local authorities too considered it unacceptably expensive. In fact in 1932 Dendy Marshall wrote to The Engineer magazine, proposing a tunnel with a revival of the atmospheric system. In a three-mile (5 km) smooth-walled tunnel; there would be trains of "one carriage fitted with about half a dozen transverse fins of india-rubber nearly fitting the tunnel". Powerful fans would propel the vehicle at up to 60 mph (97 km/h).

== Grouping of the railways ==
After World War I the government considered the future of the railways of Great Britain, and passed the Railways Act 1921. In a process referred to as the "grouping", this set up four new railway companies which were to take over nearly all the existing companies. The Southern Railway absorbed all lines on the Isle of Wight from 1 January 1923, except for the FY&NR. The compensation to shareholders was to be negotiated, and although the FY&NR was in receivership, it argued that its prospects were good because of the hoped-for Lymington tunnel connection, and it attempted to obtain a better financial settlement. The negotiation dragged on and it was not until 1 August 1923 that the transfer took place. During the hiatus period, the FY&NR trains had to revert to using the separate station at Newport, with renewed inconvenience to passengers.

The Southern Railway brought new vigour to the railways of the island, and a new Tourist Express was laid on in the summer months, with limited stops, linking Freshwater with Sandown. This started as the East and West Through Train, a name shown on carriage roofboards in 1932, and it proved a considerable success. In the following year further trains of this type were run, and the previous year's East and West Through Train was extended from Sandown to Ventnor, and named The Tourist in the public timetable. A through fast train from Ryde to Freshwater was also introduced, the first such for twenty years. The crossing loop at Ningwood was lengthened to 400 feet (120 m) in 1936 to accommodate these services, while the loops at Carisbrooke and Yarmouth were removed.

In the summer of 1939 there were thirteen trains in each direction with extra trains on Saturdays, and eight each way on Sundays. The journey time was about 37 minutes.

== The final years ==
The traffic on the line had always been highly seasonal, and the thin population in its area meant that the financial situation was precarious. Road transport of passengers and goods became increasingly dominant from the 1930s and further accelerated after World War II, and the losses on the line were unsustainable in the face of the low volume of custom. The line closed on 21 September 1953. The locomotive used on the final journey was Alverstone, built in 1891 and brought to the Island in 1926.

=== Stations ===
The line opened on 20 July 1889 and closed on 21 September 1953.

- Freshwater;
- Yarmouth;
- Ningwood;
- Calbourne & Shalfleet;
- Watchingwell; opened 20 July 1889 as a private station for Sir John Stephen Barrington Simeon; publicly advertised in 1923 and 1924;
- Carisbrooke;
- Newport (FY&NR station); opened 14 July 1913; closed 1 August 1923; intermittent use from 1914;
- Newport; Isle of Wight Central Railway (former Cowes and Newport Railway) station.

=== Gradients ===
The first 3-mile (5 km) section of the line from Freshwater followed easy gradients, but then a climb of 1 in 64 followed for a mile, and that was the ruling gradient for 6 miles (10 km) of largely switchback (sawtooth) profile to beyond Watchingwell. After the summit a descent of the same gradient followed for 3 miles (5 km) into Newport.

== Locomotives ==
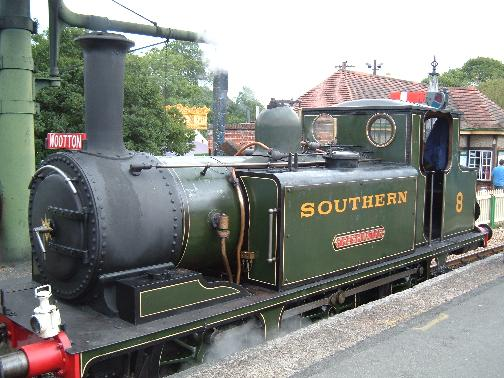
A1 Class 'Terrier' locomotive "Freshwater" in Southern Railway livery at the Isle of Wight Steam Railway. This locomotive was originally used on the Freshwater, Yarmouth and Newport Railway.

Number	Name	Builder	Class	Type	Built	Notes
1	Medina	Manning Wardle	Works 1555	0-6-0ST	1902	Originally Pauling & Elliot "Northolt". Withdrawn 1932.
2	Freshwater	Brighton	LB&SCR A1 Class	0-6-0T	1876	Originally LB&SCR 646 "Newington" and later L&SWR 734 from May 1903 before purchase by FY&NR in February 1915. It was renumbered W8 in April 1932. In 1949 it was returned to the mainland for work on Hayling Island branches until 1963. In 1979 an agreement with the former owners saw it return to the Isle of Wight for preservation. It is now back in service following a £35,000 boiler replacement; its boiler certification expires in 2019.

== Rolling stock ==
Until June 1913, the FYNR was worked by the IWCR. At the termination of the agreement, the IWCR sold five passenger coaches and 31 goods vehicles to the FYNR, and these all lasted to grouping in 1923.

The ex-IWCR passenger vehicles were insufficient, so the FYNR bought seven more secondhand from the Great Central Railway, and a four-wheeled Drewry petrol railcar was also bought in 1913. At the grouping, the FYNR had 12 passenger coaches and one railcar. These comprised five third-class (allotted SR numbers 2457–61), four composites (SR nos. 6358–61), two brake thirds (SR 4104–5), one brake composite (6990) and one railcar (2462).

The goods vehicles bought from the IWCR comprised 26 open goods wagons (allotted SR numbers 28227–52), four covered goods wagons (SR nos. 47032–5) and one brake van (SR 56038). The open goods wagons were also used for coal, and had carrying capacities of 8 or 10 long tons (8.1 or 10.2 t). Four or five of these were converted into cattle wagons by the FYNR, and soon after the grouping the SR reconverted them back to open wagons, replacing them with proper cattle wagons from the mainland.

== Current situation ==
Former station buildings:

- Freshwater is now demolished. The station building became an electronics firm and then a Co-Op store (which has since re-located across the road). The yard is now occupied by a garden centre. A portion of the platform is still visible.
- Yarmouth is now a café following a restoration in 2017 which saw some railway related additions including a distinctive fake signal box.
- Ningwood, Calbourne and Watchingwell are private houses.
- Carisbrooke has been demolished. The site is now buried under the playing fields of Archbishop King School.
- Newport(FYN) was demolished prior to the 1923 grouping but the site was visible until a new link road along the old alignment was constructed connecting Hunny Hill with the Newport Industrial Estate.

Former locomotives

- No. 2 "Freshwater" is now preserved on the Isle of Wight Steam Railway as W8 "Freshwater".

== See also ==
- Railways on the Isle of Wight
