= Albany Barracks =

Military installation on the Isle of Wight (1798–1960)

- Newport, Isle of Wight
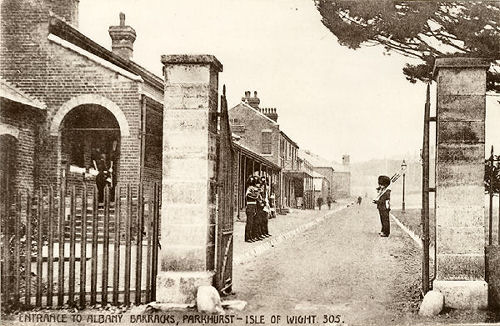
- Albany Barracks

Site information
- Type: Barracks
- Owner: Ministry of Defence
- Operator: British Army

Location
- Location within Isle of Wight
- Coordinates: 50.712°N 1.307°W

Site history
- Built: 1798
- Built for: War Office
- In use: 1798-1960

Garrison information
- Occupants: Isle of Wight Rifles

Albany Barracks (formerly Parkhurst Barracks) was a military installation on the Isle of Wight.

== History ==
Construction of the barracks, which were originally named Parkhurst Barracks after the forest where they were located, was completed in September 1798. Shortly after completion they were renamed "Albany Barracks" after Prince Frederick, Duke of York and Albany, who had been Commander-in-Chief of the Forces. By 1807 they were occupied by the 29th (Worcestershire) Regiment of Foot preparing for action in the Peninsular War. In 1859 the Isle of Wight Rifles was raised as a defence force for the Island and used the barracks as its headquarters and drill hall.

Parkhurst Military Cemetery was set up to serve the barracks. It includes the war graves of 59 Commonwealth service personnel of the First World War and 26 of the Second World War, the latter including one unidentified British Army soldier and two unidentified Merchant Navy seamen.

In 1959 the barracks were the location of a ceremony to celebrate the formation of the Duke of Edinburgh's Royal Regiment. The barracks were decommissioned in the early 1960s and the site was redeveloped as Albany Prison at that time.
