= Watchingwell Halt railway station =

Former railway station in England

Coordinates: 50°41′36″N 1°22′00″W

Watchingwell (IOW)
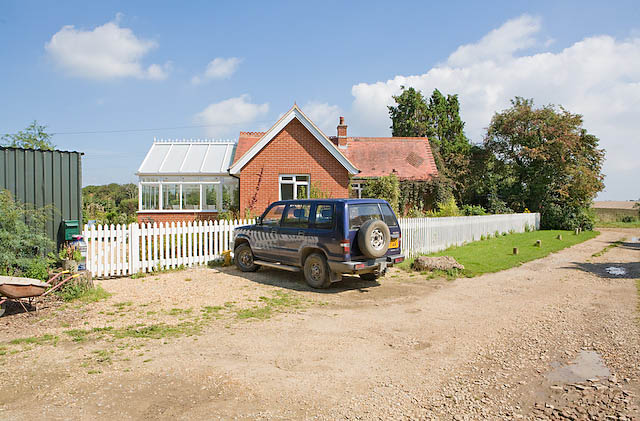
- Watchingwell Station, now a private residence.

General information
- Location: Upper Watchingwell, Isle of Wight; England
- Grid reference: SZ448884
- Platforms: 1

Other information
- Status: Disused

History
- Pre-grouping: Freshwater, Yarmouth & Newport Railway(1897-1913); Isle of Wight Central Railway (1913 to 1923)
- Post-grouping: Southern Railway (1923 to 1948); Southern Region of British Railways (1948 to 1953)

Key dates
- 19 June 1897: Opened as private station
- 1923: became public station
- 1948: destaffed
- 21 September 1953: Closed
Location

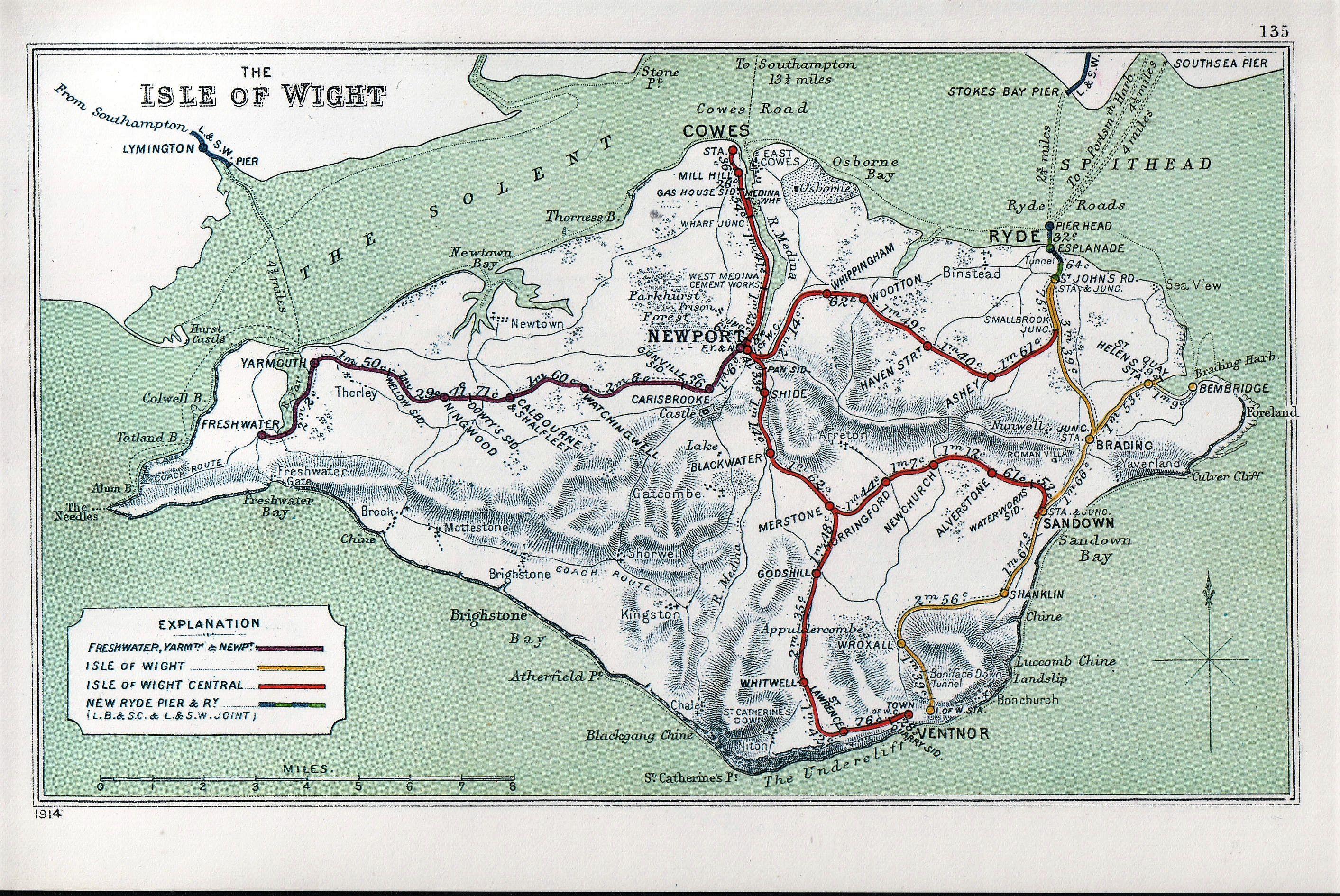
A 1914 Railway Clearing House map of lines around The Isle of Wight.

Watchingwell Halt was an intermediate station on the Freshwater, Yarmouth and Newport Railway, situated near the hamlet of Upper Watchingwell, that started life as a private halt. It was built at the behest of Sir John Barrington Simeon, M.P for Southampton, in 1897, not included in timetables available to the general public until the creation of the Southern in 1923, de-staffed in 1948 and closed in 1953. It was, by its very nature, a sparsely used station. It is now a private residence Watchingwell Station adorned with railway memorabilia.

The station was described in the Railway Magazine:

Visitors to the Isle of Wight, especially those who have traversed the railway line from Newport to Freshwater in the Island, will not need telling of the witching station of Watchingwell. It is a spot almost fairy-like in its beauty, a veritable summer paradise. You have only got four miles or so from the capital of the Island when you come across one of the tiniest, prettiest, and most attractive private railway stations in the whole of our country.

It is owned and was constructed by the Freshwater, Yarmouth and Newport Railway by agreement with Sir John Stephen Harrington Simeon, who lives at the large house in the immediate neighbourhood of this station. He fitted up Watchingwell, house and estate, to suit his own ideas, and when the railway was projected this gentleman required this facility as a quid pro quo upon his agreeing to the railway being constructed through his estate. As Sir John is himself a director of the celebrated London and South-Western Railway, you may be sure that there are few things about railway stations and their appointments that he does not perfectly understand, and so you will not be surprised to learn that Watchingwell Station is as complete as it well can be made.

In one thing it is novel amongst stations of its kind. The duties at the station are so light and the receipts so small that it is not surprising to learn that its Stationmaster is a woman! There are other places that have women as "masters" of stations, but not another private station owns one at the present time, I believe. She has living-rooms attached to the station buildings, and extremely comfortable those rooms are, too. Her husband is a platelayer on the railway.

The trains stop for Sir John's family and visitors when required, being signalled by the Stationnmaster to do so. Semaphores are provided for this purpose, and are worked by the woman in charge. The station itself lies in a "block" section, so that special electrical connection is not necessary. The only people using it are the tenants on the estate and visitors to, or those having direct business with, Sir J. Simeon or his household.

| Preceding station | Disused railways | Following station |
|---|---|---|
| Calbourne & Shalfleet | British Railways; Southern Region; Freshwater, Yarmouth and Newport Railway | Carisbrooke |

== See also ==
- List of closed railway stations in Britain
