= Calbourne & Shalfleet railway station =

Disused railway station in England

Coordinates: 50°41′32″N 1°24′04″W

Calbourne
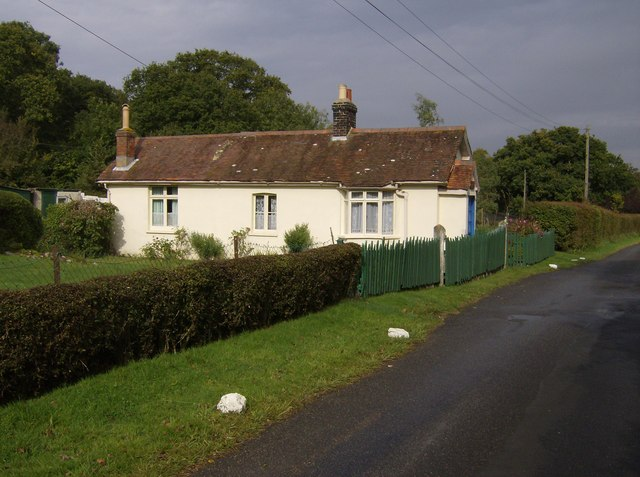
- The crossing keeper’s cottage at Pound Lane, now a private residence.

General information
- Location: Five Houses, near Calbourne, Isle of Wight; England
- Grid reference: SZ423883
- Platforms: 1

Other information
- Status: Disused

History
- Pre-grouping: Freshwater, Yarmouth & Newport Railway(1888-1913); Isle of Wight Central Railway (1913 to 1923)
- Post-grouping: Southern Railway (1923 to 1948); Southern Region of British Railways (1948 to 1953)

Key dates
- 10 September 1888: Opened (freight)
- 20 July 1889: Opened (passengers)
- 21 September 1953: Closed
Location

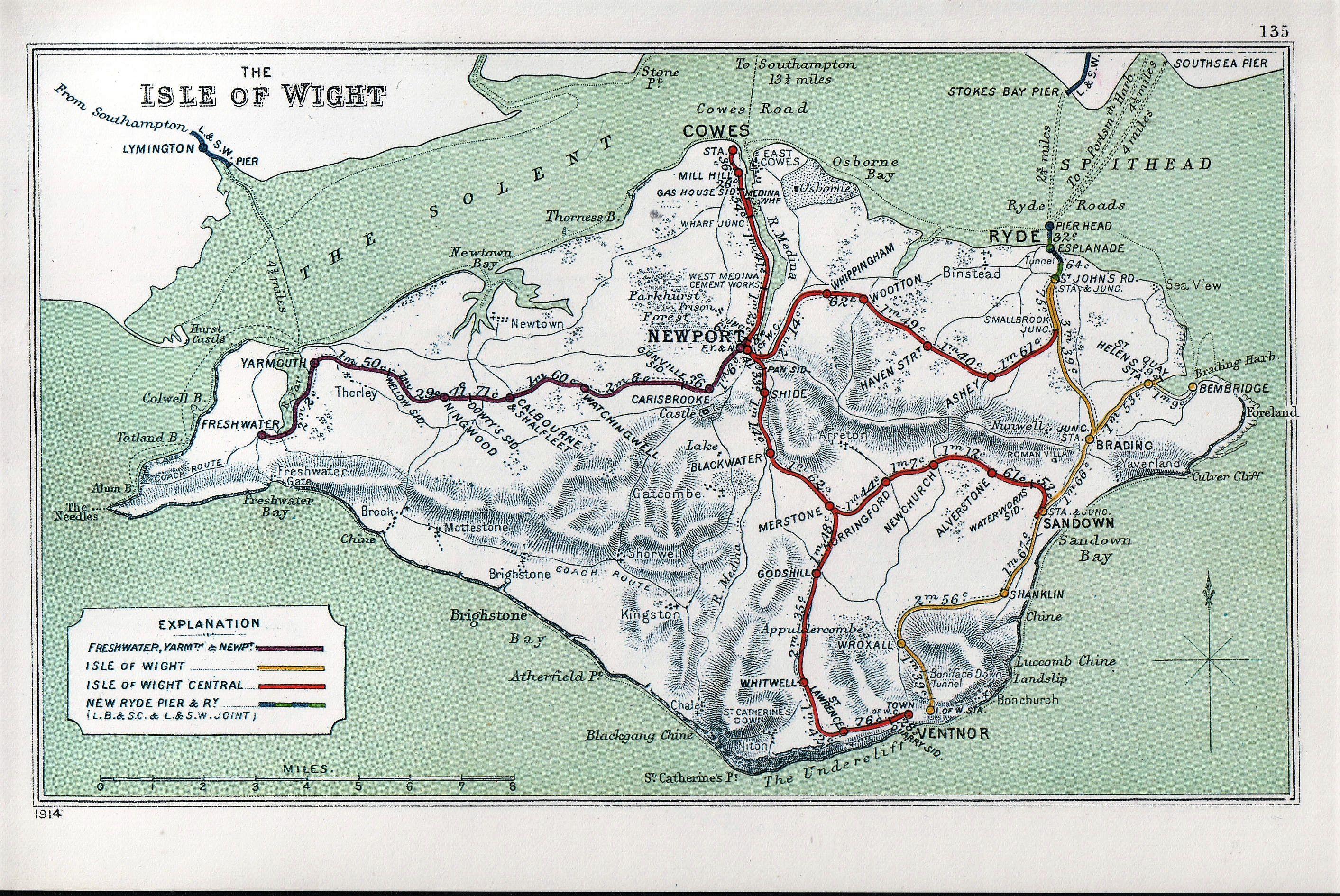
A 1914 Railway Clearing House map of lines around The Isle of Wight.

Calbourne and Shalfleet railway station, was an intermediate station of the Freshwater, Yarmouth and Newport Railway, incorporated in 1860, opened over a ten-month period between 1888 and 1889 and closed 65 years later. Situated between the two villages and serving a moderately populous rural area it was a "reasonably" successful station on an ultimately unprofitable line. Originally the station had a cottage style front but after absorption by the Southern a corrugated building from the acrimonious-split era was relocated to the site. The station itself, situated on the down side, has long been demolished and replaced with a modern bungalow; but the level-crossing keeper's cottage, a short distance away at Pounds Lane, is still visitable.

Preceding station	Disused railways	Following station
Ningwood	British Railways; Southern Region; Freshwater, Yarmouth and Newport Railway	Watchingwell

== See also ==
- List of closed railway stations in Britain
