= Ningwood railway station =

Former railway station in Isle of Wight, UK

Coordinates: 50°41′35″N 1°26′02″W

Ningwood
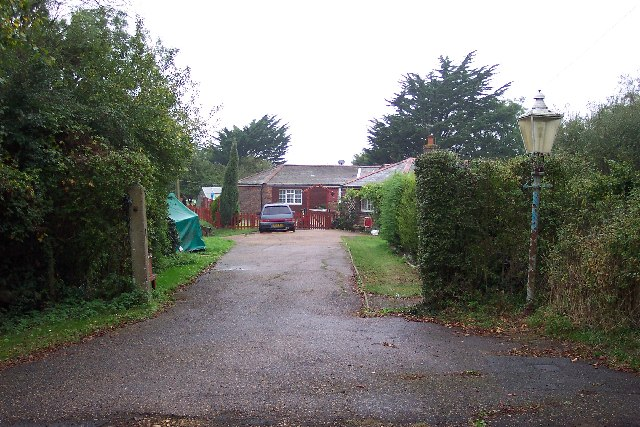
- The old station at Ningwood, now a private residence.

General information
- Location: Ningwood, Isle of Wight; England
- Grid reference: SZ401883
- Platforms: 2

Other information
- Status: Disused

History
- Original company: Freshwater, Yarmouth and Newport Railway
- Pre-grouping: Freshwater, Yarmouth and Newport Railway
- Post-grouping: Southern Railway; Southern Region of British Railways

Key dates
- 10 September 1888: Opened (freight)
- 20 July 1889: Opened (passengers)
- 21 September 1953: Closed
Location

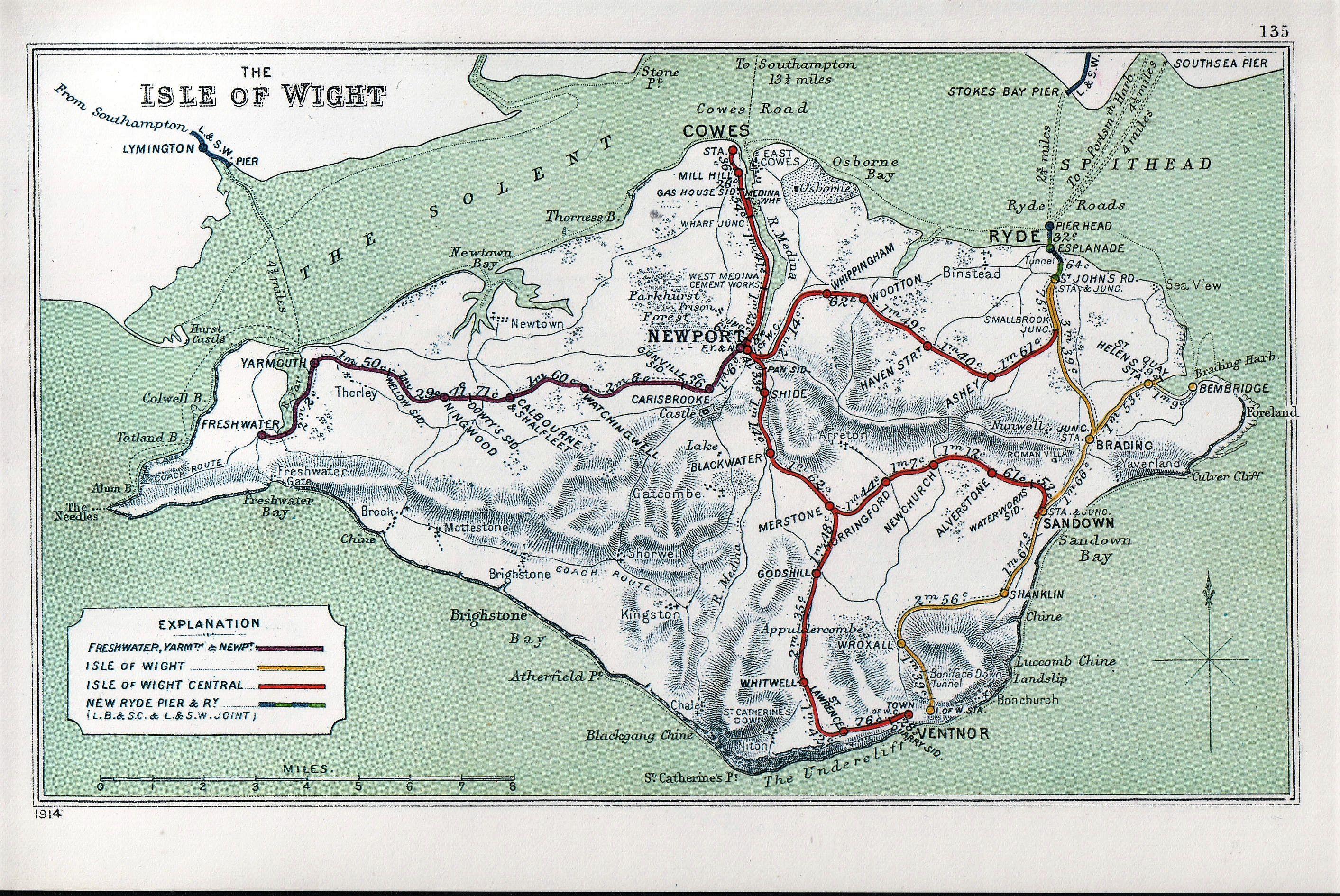
A 1914 Railway Clearing House map of lines around The Isle of Wight.

Ningwood railway station, was an intermediate station of the Freshwater, Yarmouth and Newport Railway, incorporated in 1860.

== History ==
It opened over a ten-month period between 1888 and 1889 and closed 65 years later. A typical rural station that rapidly lost passengers once buses reached West Wight, it was one of the less economically viable stations on this unprofitable line. Despite the addition of a 400-foot (120 m) long passing loop and water tank in 1927, the station was in latter years a somewhat lonely outpost. The station house, situated on the "down" side, is now a private residence and the modest passenger shelter on the "up" side their garden shed.

== Stationmasters ==
- Henry George Spinks ca. 1899 ca. 1901 (afterwards station master at Yarmouth)
- William Oliver Bennett 1905 - 1913 (afterwards station master at Newport FYN station)
- Ernest Charles Rolf ca. 1915

Preceding station	Disused railways	Following station
Yarmouth	British Railways; Southern Region; Freshwater, Yarmouth and Newport Railway	Calbourne & Shalfleet

== See also ==
- List of closed railway stations in Britain
