= Newport railway station (Isle of Wight Central Railway) =

Former railway station in Isle of Wight, UK

Newport IWCR
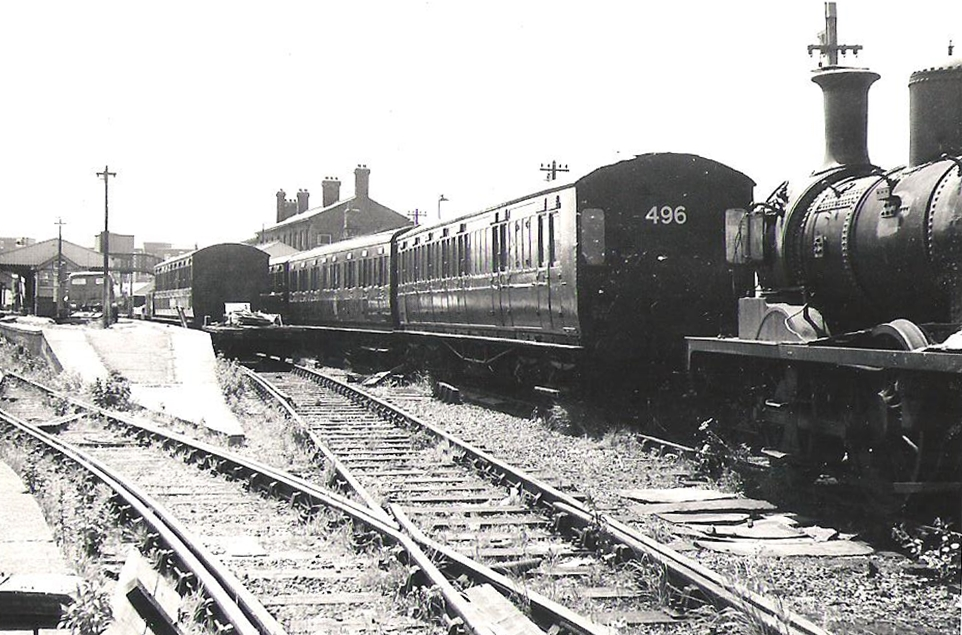
- Railway Station, Newport, Isle of Wight. Shortly before it was demolished, to make way for a new bypass. O2 class No 24 Calbourne awaits restoration

General information
- Location: Newport, Isle of Wight; England
- Coordinates: 50.7028°N 1.2930°W
- Grid reference: SZ500894
- Platforms: 3

Other information
- Status: Disused

History
- Pre-grouping: Cowes and Newport Railway (1862–1887), Ryde and Newport railway (1875–1887), Isle of Wight and Newport Junction Railway (1879–1887), Isle of Wight Central Railway (1887–1923)
- Post-grouping: Southern Railway (1923 to 1948); Southern Region of British Railways (1948 to 1966)

Key dates
- 16 June 1862: Opened
- 21 February 1966: Closed for passengers
- 18 April 1966: Closed for goods
Location

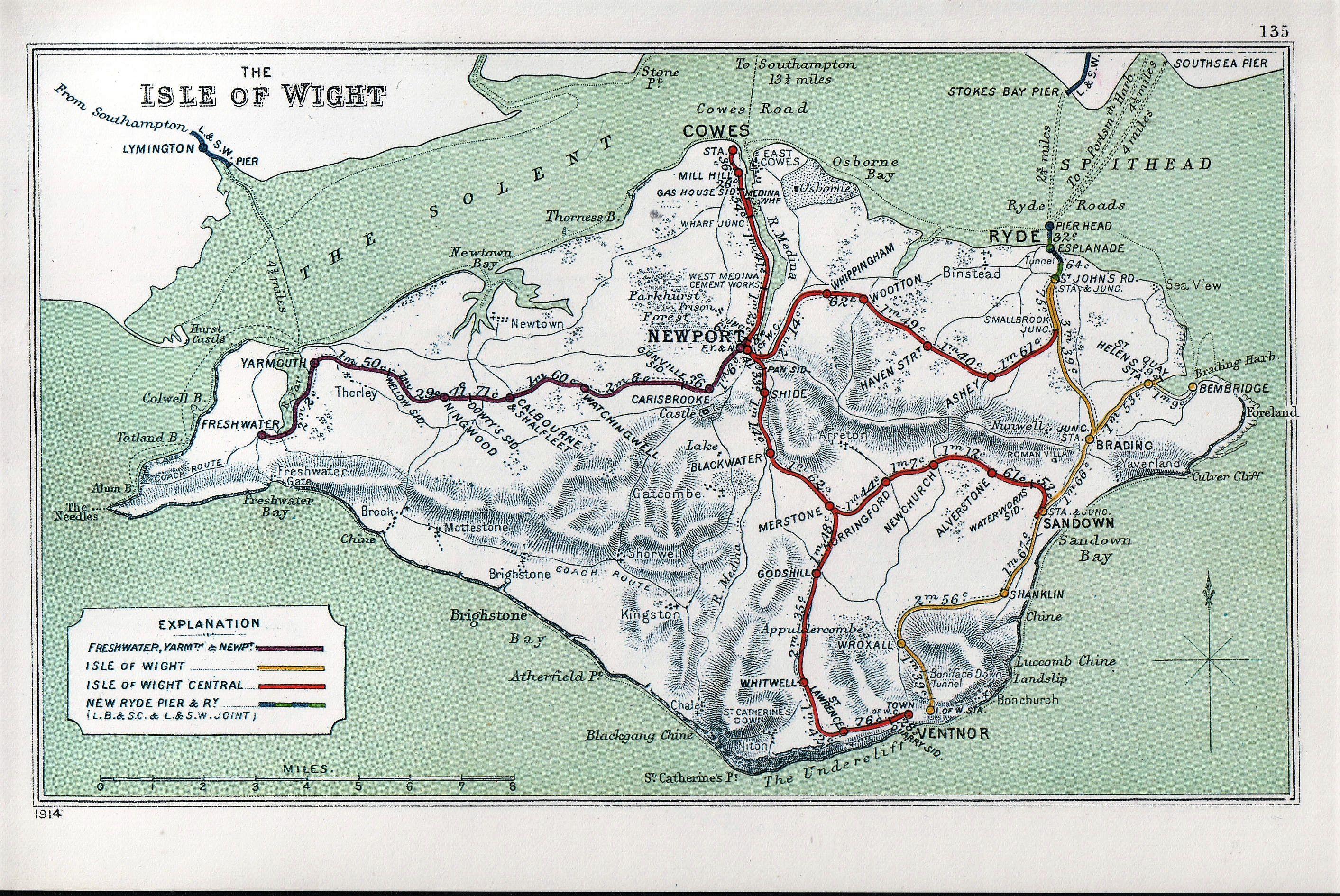
A 1914 Railway Clearing House map of lines around The Isle of Wight.

Newport railway station was established in 1862 with the opening of the Cowes and Newport Railway. It was enlarged in December 1875 when the lines to Ryde and Ventnor were opened. The station was also used by the Freshwater, Yarmouth and Newport Railway from its opening in 1888 until 1913, when that company opened its own station nearby. Upon the formation of the Southern Railway in 1923 reverted to using this station. The station was closed by British Railways in 1966. It was then used as a base for the Wight Locomotive Society until January 1971, when it was demolished.

== Isle of Wight Central Railway station ==
Newport railway station was a pivotal station within the unique railway network on the Isle of Wight, that began in 1862 when the Cowes and Newport Railway opened for business. Situated in the centre of the town, the station was enlarged in 1875 with the opening of the Ryde and Newport Railway in December 1875, which also connected the station to Ventnor. Traffic was also increased with the opening of the branch to Sandown in 1879, by the Isle of Wight (Newport Junction) Railway. In July 1887 The Cowes and Newport Railway, the Ryde and Newport Railway, and the Isle of Wight (Newport Junction) Railway were merged to form the Isle of Wight Central Railway (IWCR).

A major employer on the island, it was noted for its busy and purposeful camaraderie. Closed in 1966, the station served as a base for the Wight Locomotive Society until January 1971, when the site was demolished by scrap merchants. The station site is now built over with much of it now lost under the A3054, Medina Way.

=== Stationmasters ===
- William Thomas Gubbins ca. 1864
- Mr. Williams ca. 1865
- Henry Thomas ca. 1871
- William B.S. Greenwood 1877 - 1889 (afterwards station master at Cowes)
- H. Frank Williams from 1889 (afterwards station master at Merston)
- George W. Ranger 1894 - ca. 1906 (formerly station master at Cowes)
- Thomas William Blanchfield ca. 1909 - 1911
- Henry Young 1911 - 1927
- A. Holdaway 1928 - 1936 (formerly station master at Petworth)
- Percy Hawkins 1936 - 1940 (formerly station master at Ventnor)
- Alex Wheway from 1941 (formerly station master at Sandown)

== Freshwater Yarmouth & Newport Railway station ==
The trains of the Freshwater, Yarmouth and Newport Railway's terminated at the IWCR station from the opening of that line in 1888 until 1913, when a separate FYN station opened nearby. However, upon the formation of the Southern Railway, all trains to Newport reverted to using the IWCR station.

== Motive power depots ==
The Ryde and Newport Railway opened a wooden engine shed, with coaling and watering facilities on the eastern side of Newport station on 20 December 1875 The Freshwater Yarmouth and Newport Railway also opened a small shed close to the site of Newport Priory, but this was closed upon the formation of the Southern Railway.

== See also ==
- List of closed railway stations in Britain

Preceding station	Disused railways	Following station
Terminus	British Railways; Southern Region; IoW CR: Newport to Sandown line	Shide
Terminus	British Railways; Southern Region; IoW CR: Newport to Cowes line	Cement Mills Halt
Terminus	British Railways; Southern Region; IoW CR: Newport to Smallbrook Junction line	Whippingham
Terminus	British Railways; Southern Region; FYNR: Newport (Note: For ten years, from 1913 to 1923, there was a separate station for this route a short distance away) to Freshwater line	Carisbrooke
