= Carisbrooke railway station =

Disused railway station in Isle of Wight, UK

Carisbrooke
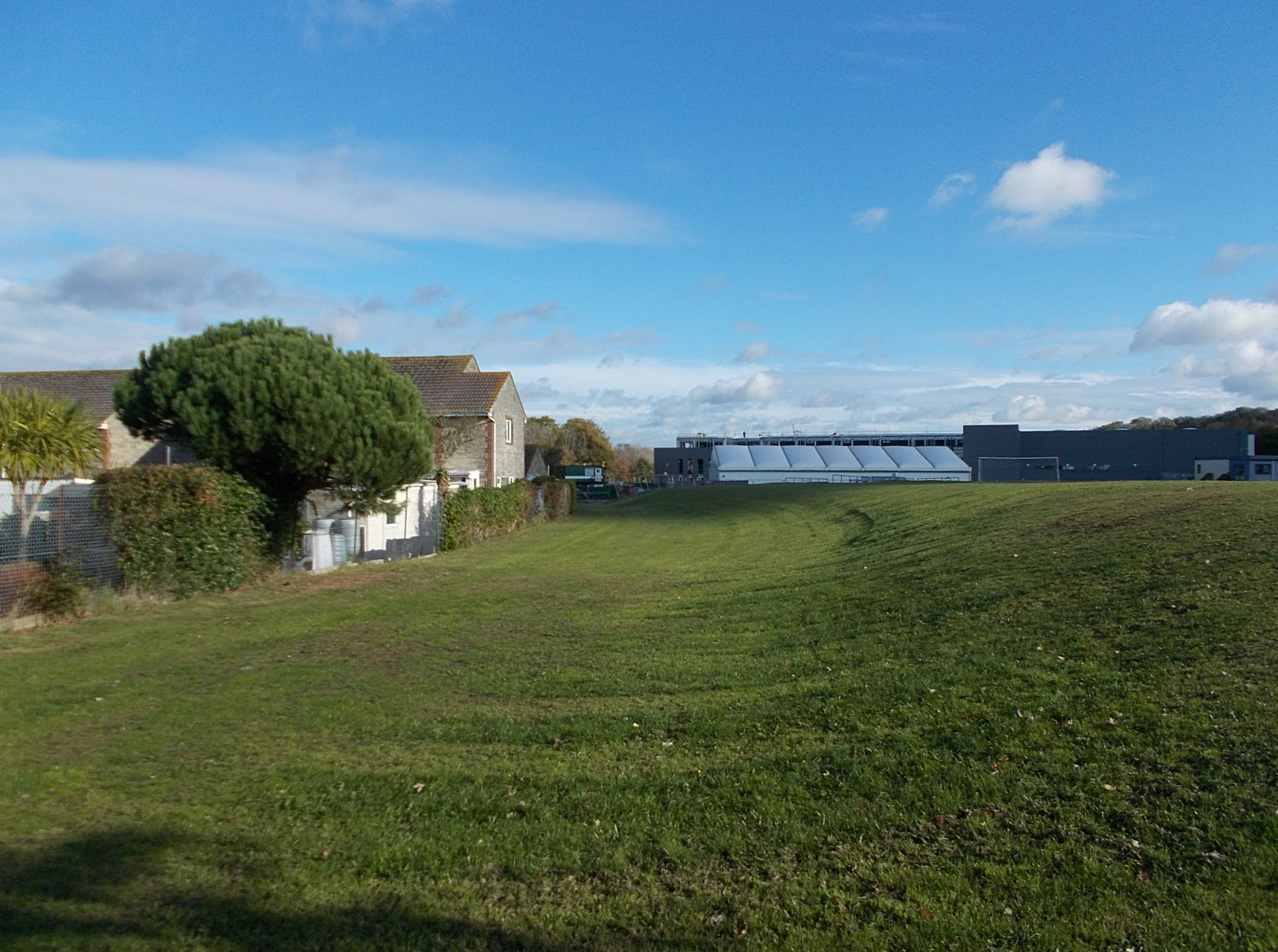
- The site of the former station in 2018

General information
- Location: Carisbrooke, Isle of Wight; England
- Coordinates: 50.6942°N 1.3121°W
- Grid reference: SZ486885
- Platforms: 1889-1927:two; 1927-53:one

Other information
- Status: Disused

History
- Original company: Freshwater, Yarmouth and Newport Railway
- Pre-grouping: Freshwater, Yarmouth and Newport Railway
- Post-grouping: Southern Railway (1923 to 1948); Southern Region of British Railways (1948 to 1953)

Key dates
- 20 July 1889: Opened
- 21 September 1953: Closed
Location

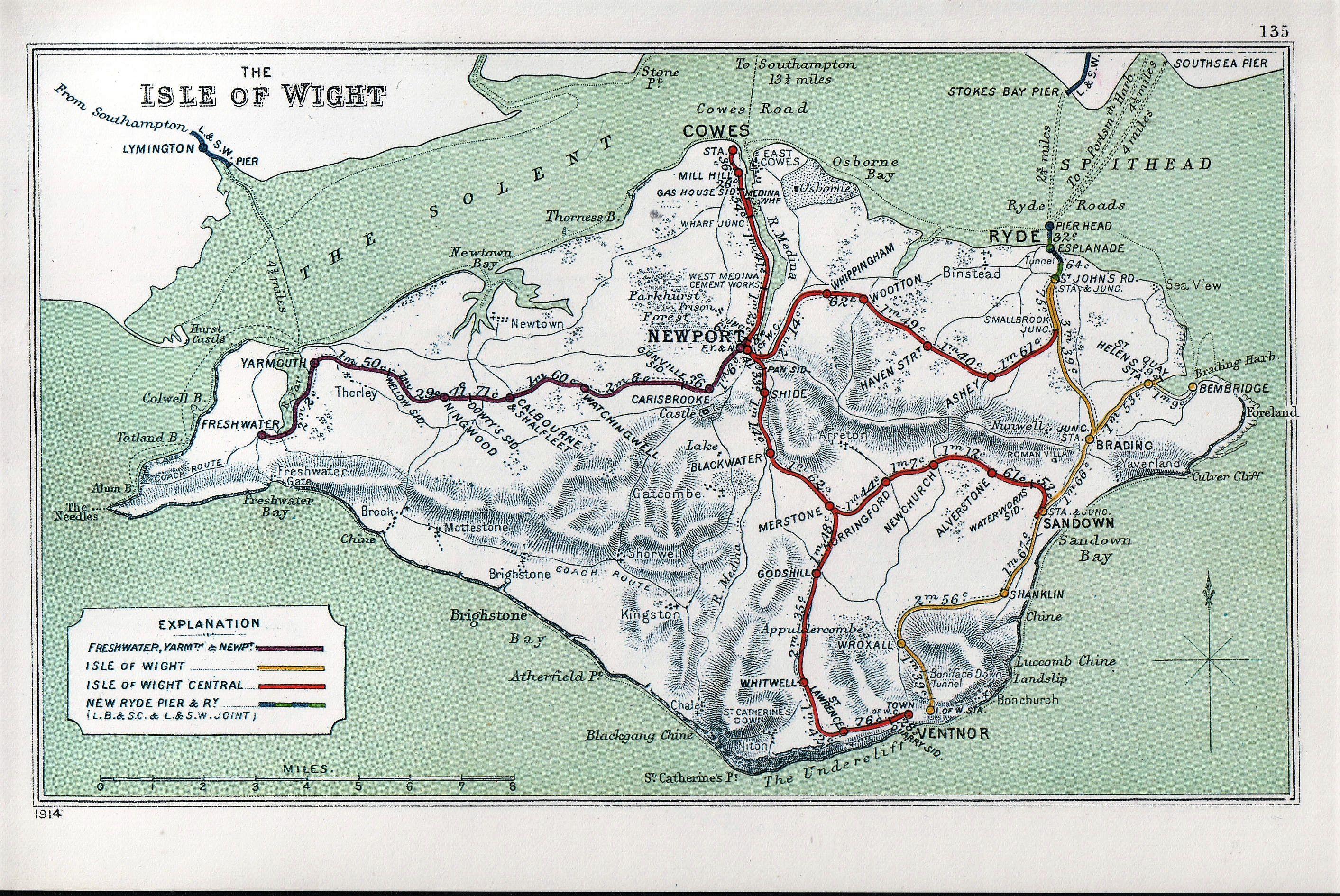
A 1914 Railway Clearing House map of lines around The Isle of Wight.

Carisbrooke Station was a railway station situated near the village of Carisbrooke, just outside Newport, Isle of Wight, off the south coast of England. It was an intermediate station on the Freshwater, Yarmouth and Newport Railway. It originally had 2 platforms but one platform was abandoned in 1927. It was a busy station for the nearby castle until the advent of the bus routes, but little used thereafter. Closed in 1953, its goods yard was by then derelict and overgrown (its only recent use having been by prisoners during World War II). The station has long been demolished and the site is no longer clearly discernible within a school playing field amongst modern development.

Preceding station	Disused railways	Following station
Watchingwell	British Railways; Southern Region; Freshwater, Yarmouth and Newport Railway	Newport or Separate FYN station (1913–1923)

== See also ==
- List of closed railway stations in Britain
