= Yarmouth railway station (Isle of Wight) =

Former railway station in Yarmouth, Isle of Wight

Coordinates: 50°42′10″N 1°29′42″W

Yarmouth (IOW)
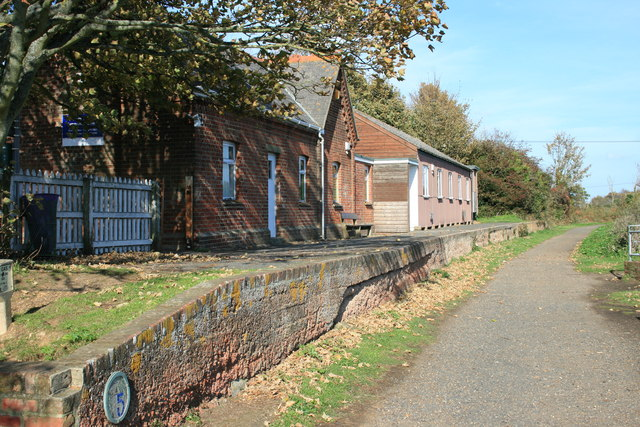
- The former station building, now passed by National Cycle Route 22.

General information
- Location: Yarmouth, Isle of Wight; England
- Grid reference: SZ358895
- Platforms: 2 (until 1923); 1 (1923-53)

Other information
- Status: Disused

History
- Pre-grouping: Freshwater, Yarmouth and Newport Railway (1888-1913); Isle of Wight Central Railway (1913 to 1923)
- Post-grouping: Southern Railway (1923 to 1948); Southern Region of British Railways (1948 to 1953)

Key dates
- 10 September 1888: Opened (freight)
- 20 July 1889: Opened (passengers)
- 21 September 1953: Closed
Location

Yarmouth railway station, was an intermediate station of the Freshwater, Yarmouth and Newport Railway.

== History ==
It was incorporated in 1860, opened over a ten-month period between 1888 and 1889 and closed 65 years later. Situated on the outskirts of the town) it was one of the more economically viable stations on a generally unprofitable line. Until the 1920s there was a lengthy passing loop and second (staggered) platform. The former station building was for a period used as a Youth Club. The original station building has been extended by the addition to its north of a replica station building, and since 2022 has housed a restaurant. It is still very recognisable as a FYNR station.

== Stationmasters ==
- George William Ranger until ca. 1891 (afterwards station master at Cowes)
- Robert White ca. 1898 ca. 1909
- Henry George Spinks ca. 1910 - 1911 (injured during a shunting accident resulting in the amputation of his arm)
- Henry William Hodges 1911 - 1924
- Charles Dennett 1924 - 1930 (formerly station master at St Lawrence and Ventnor West, afterwards station master at Gosport)
- A.W. Young ca. 1936 ca. 1937

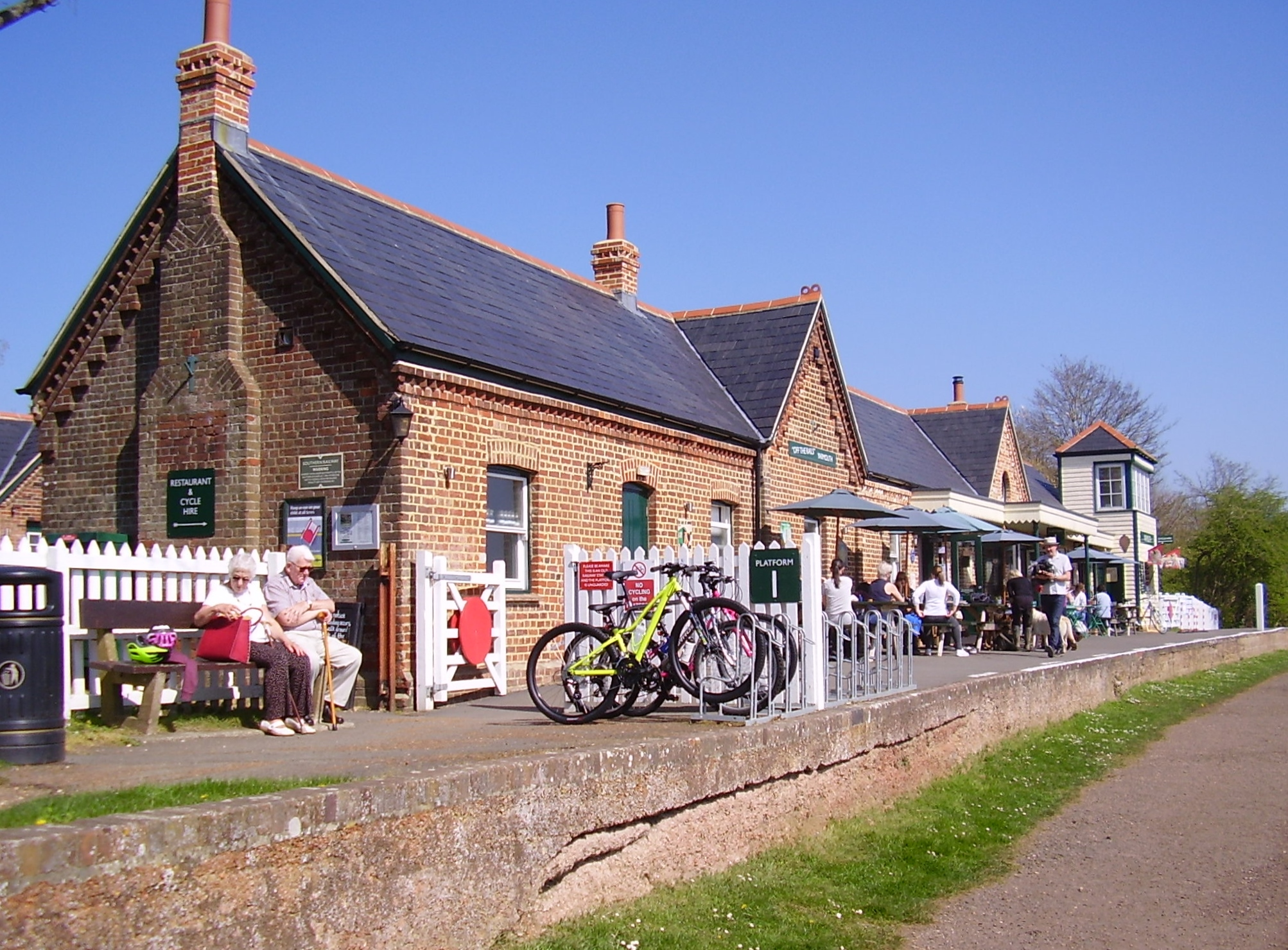
The former station in 2017, now a restaurant.

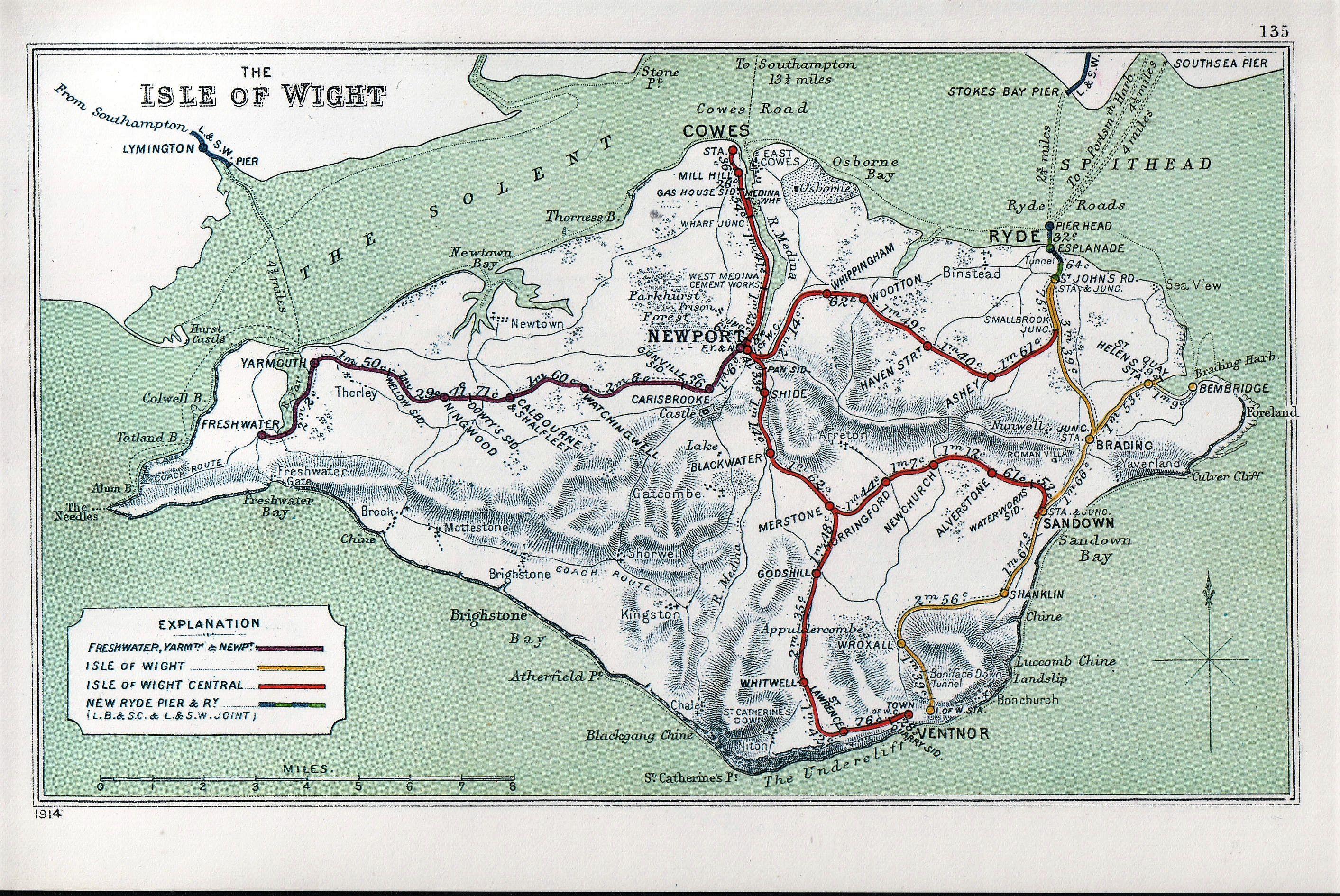
A 1914 Railway Clearing House map of lines around The Isle of Wight.

Preceding station	Disused railways	Following station
Freshwater	British Railways; Southern Region; Freshwater, Yarmouth and Newport Railway	Ningwood

== See also ==
- List of closed railway stations in Britain
