= Freshwater railway station =

Former railway station on the Isle of Wight, UK

Coordinates: 50°40′56″N 1°30′58″W

Freshwater
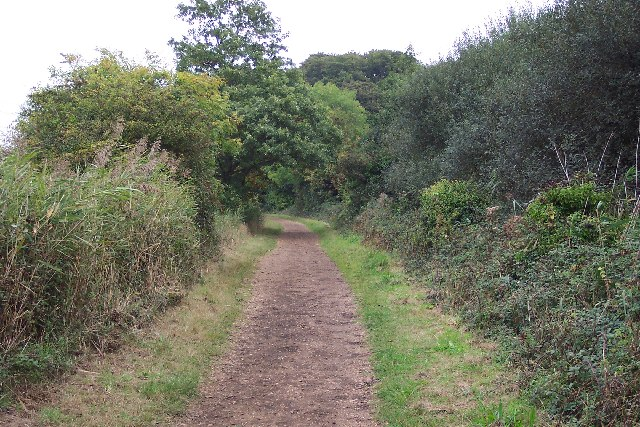
- The old Freshwater to Newport railway line (now part of CycleRoute NCN23 route) as it approaches the village.

General information
- Location: Freshwater, Isle of Wight; England
- Grid reference: SZ343871
- Platforms: 1

Other information
- Status: Disused

History
- Pre-grouping: Freshwater, Yarmouth & Newport Railway(1888-1913); Isle of Wight Central Railway (1913 to 1923)
- Post-grouping: Southern Railway (1923 to 1948); Southern Region of British Railways (1948 to 1953)

Key dates
- 10 September 1888: Opened (freight)
- 20 July 1889: Opened (passengers)
- 21 September 1953: Closed
Location

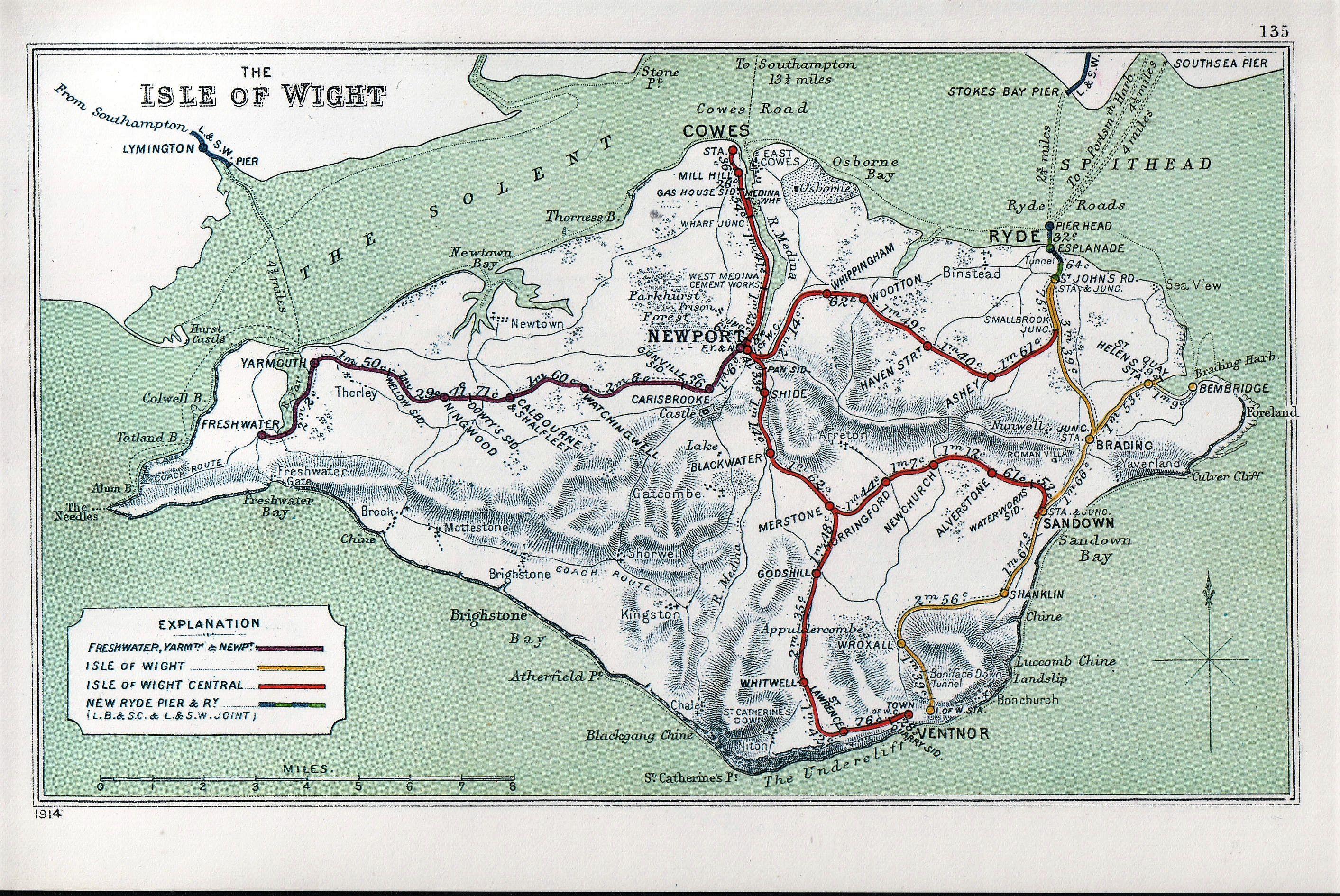
A 1914 Railway Clearing House map of lines around The Isle of Wight.

Freshwater railway station was the westerly terminus and largest station of the Freshwater, Yarmouth and Newport Railway, the platform being extended to accommodate the "Tourist Train", a non-stop service from Ventnor.

== History ==
Incorporated as the Freshwater, Yarmouth and Newport Railway Company in 1860, and opened over a ten-month period between 1888 and 1889, it closed 65 years later, having been situated too far from the tourist honeypots of The Needles and Alum Bay to be consistently profitable. There was a run-round loop, and a goods siding often used for cattle loading. After closure the station was built over by a factory, but this in turn has been demolished and a supermarket now occupies the site.

== Stationmasters ==
- Frederick George Drudge 1889 - ca. 1894 (formerly station master at Horringford)
- William Denyer ca. 1899 ca. 1901
- F. Newland 1905 - 1908 (afterwards station master at Whitwell)
- Samuel John Urry 1908 - ca. 1915 (formerly station master at Shide, then Calbourne)
- S. Russell ca. 1936

Preceding station	Disused railways	Following station
Terminus	British Railways; Southern Region; Freshwater, Yarmouth and Newport Railway	Yarmouth

== See also ==
- List of closed railway stations in Britain
