= List of Isle of Wight Steam Railway locomotives and rolling stock =

This is a comprehensive list of rolling stock of the Isle of Wight Steam Railway at Havenstreet, Isle of Wight.

== Steam locomotives ==
Havenstreet currently boasts a surplus of ex-Wight railway network stalwarts & industrial tank engine designs. More are being restored all the time, covering for other locomotives as they themselves are taken out of service. In the near future, additional classes from the mainland may be brought in for when the railway expands its operations.

Number & Name	Description	History & Current Status	Livery	Date	Photograph
Operational
No. W8; Freshwater	LB&SCR A1 Class; 0-6-0T	No. W8 was originally named Newington and numbered 46. It worked for both the LB&SCR and the LSWR, and moved to Wight in 1913, where it was later renamed and numbered to match the standard of naming the island's engines after towns. 1949 saw its career on the Isle end and it returned to the mainland for work on Hayling Island branches until 1963. In 1979 an agreement with the former owners saw its return to Wight for preservation and in two years it started hauling trains on the private rail network. After a boiler replacement costing £35,000, this locomotive's boiler ticket expired in November 2018 and has been dismantled for its ten-yearly overhaul. In February 2025, Freshwater returned to service in time for the Winter Gala and Dark Ales Festival.	Southern Railway Green	1876	
No. W24; Calbourne	LSWR O2 Class; 0-4-4T	W24 was built with remaining 59 engines in the class at Nine Elms Locomotive Works, first working at Fratton and Exeter before falling into the hands of the Southern Railway, who moved its to the Island in 1925, along with 22 other 02s to replace the older locomotives employed by the railways on the Isle of Wight. When electrification came in 1967, it was retained for preservation with the IOWSR, the first of the current fleet to do so. After 25 years its restoration ended in 1992, and a second overhaul saw its in operation from 2010 until 2019. It was then withdrawn from service, undergoing another overhaul until it returned to service in 2021.	SR Malachite Green	1891	
No. WD192; Waggoner	Hunslet Austerity; 0-6-0ST	Originally WD192, it was part of the final batch of 14 engines ordered by the War Department, and worked on the Longmoor Military Railway, Hampshire, before moving to Histon in 1959, and later Bicester in 1959. From 1961 it spent several years in storage, but in 1968 was renumbered and named in recognition of its services. After a further 16 years in service, it was retired and displayed at the NAM in 1984 It was moved to the Isle of Wight in 2005. It returned to steam in 2006 and ownership was later passed on to the Isle of Wight Steam Railway. The locomotive put in a very reliable and high mileage performance during its ten-year boiler ticket, which expired in December 2015. The locomotive is undergoing a ten-yearly overhaul. In 2022, it completed its overhaul and was returned to service.	Lined Blue	1953	
No. WD198 Royal Engineer	Hunslet Austerity; 0-6-0ST	Though it was built within the final batch of WD-ordered "Austerities", WD198 did not start its career until 1956, which included working with WD92 at Bicester. Following a period in store, it was overhauled and named Royal Engineer, and became the last of its kind in service with the Army upon withdrawal in 1991. It became part of the NAM collection and moved to the Isle of Wight, where it was overhauled and fitted with air brakes. It had a major boiler overhaul from 2015 to 2017. It is now back in service after three years. Boiler ticket expires in 2027.	WD Green	1953	
No. 41313	LMS Ivatt Class 2; 2-6-2T	No. 41313 spent the first few years of its BR-career in the south of England, replacing pre-grouping passenger tanks. Upon withdrawal from its final base at Eastleigh (71A) in 1965 it was sold to Woodham Brothers for scrap. It was purchased by the ILT in 1975, and was originally meant as a spares loco for 41298, though its condition was assessed as being good enough for restoration. The move to the Isle of Wight was made in 2006, two years before the remaining members of the Ivatt Trust's collection started arriving and it has since been in store awaiting full restoration. It moved to the East Somerset Railway for restoration in February 2015 and returned to service in June 2017.	BR Lined Black with the Late Crest	1952	
Undergoing overhaul, restoration or repairs
No. W2 Yarmouth	LB&SCR E1 Class; 0-6-0T	Yarmouth was first allocated to Brighton as LB&SCR No. 110 Burgundy. It was then based at numerous depots around the south of England, becoming Southern Railway No. B110 after the Grouping in 1923. After its retirement in 1925, it was sold to the Cannock and Rugeley Colliery Company where it was fitted with a new boiler and renumbered as No. 9. It was withdrawn from service again in 1963 when it was preserved at the Chasewater Railway until 1978 when it moved to the East Somerset Railway. After a long overhaul, it returned to steam in 1993, but firebox problems caused its to be withdrawn prematurely in 1997. After spending many years dismantled, it was cosmetically restored in 2011 and painted into inauthentic BR unlined black as No. 32110. In 2012, it was purchased by the Isle of Wight as part of a deal which saw LMS Class 2MT 2-6-0 No. 46447 move to the ESR in exchange for No. 32110. The loco arrived at Havenstreet in October 2012. In 2021 work began to take Yarmouth apart for restoration. The identity of No. W2 was previously worn by one of the E1's that worked on the line from 1932.	BR Unlined Black with the Early Crest	1877	
No. W37 Invincible	Hawthorn Leslie; 0-4-0ST	No. W37 Invincible worked as a shunter at Woolwich Arsenal for 40 years along with several other 0-4-0STs. After an extensive period in storage, it was overhauled for a transfer to the RAE of Farnborough. Following the closure of the centre, the new owner placed its on loan to the railway from 1971 until his death in 1979, and ownership was passed to the WLS, who carry out its overhauls and repairs. It was featured in Christie's Iron Horse music video. Nearing the end of the 2009 season, it suffered a broken spring hanger and was withdrawn from service. Its overhaul started in 2017.	Lined Maroon	1915	
No. 41298	LMS Ivatt Class 2; 2-6-2T	No. 41298 was built at Crewe with all but 10 engines of the same design and was first allocated to shunt stock at Bricklayers Arms, London. Leaving the site in 1953, its next work was in South West England around Devon and Barnstaple. 1967 saw its purchased for preservation at the Longmoor Military Railway, before moving to the Buckinghamshire Railway Centre in 1970 after it closed down. The decision to move the Ivatt Trust's collection to the Isle of Wight was settled and 41298 (which arrived in late 2008), is now the first of the owner's locomotives in the overhaul queue. The engine was steamed, and undertook its first moves in preservation on 20 August 2014. The locomotive hauled its first passenger train in preservation in September 2015, and made its official return to service at the start of the 2016 running season. At the end of the 2023 season, 41298 was withdrawn from service.	BR Lined Black with the Late Crest	1951	
Stored or static
No. W11; Newport	LB&SCR A1 Class; 0-6-0T	Built at Brighton Works and originally No. 40 Brighton, Newport is one of the most famous members of the class, having been chosen to take part in the Paris Exhibition of 1878. Its performance earned its a gold medal, and over two decades at Battersea were followed by a move to Wight in 1902. Ownership passed to the Southern in 1923 and it was renamed and numbered in 1930, returning to the mainland in 1947, where it was purchased by Billy Butlin in 1963 for display at his Pwllheli camp. Ownership passed to the WLS in 1976, and it was restored to running order by 1989. In 2002 it was withdrawn from service for overhaul and replacement of its boiler. This work was completed in March 2014 and on 12 March 2014, Newport passed its boiler examination and steam test. It re-entered service on Saturday 24 May 2014. In 2023, Newport was withdrawn from service, and is currently on display in Train Story.	Southern Railway Green	1878	
Haydock	Robert Stephenson and Company; 0-6-0T	Gifted from the National Trust Penrhyn Castle collection in early 2024. Currently on display in Train Story.	Green	1879	
Currently elsewhere
No. W38 Ajax	Barclay 0-6-0T	Ajax was built to order by the former Sulphide Corporation of London, where it stayed for many years before moving overseas to Iran for work at the Anglo-Persian Oil CompanyAnglo-Persian Oil Company. Several years later it was repatriated and worked at Llandarcy Refinery, until retirement in 1968. The owner moved its the Havenstreet for restoration, though for over two decades it was stored in the shed until work began. The boiler passed its steam test in 2003 and within two years Ajax returned to work with air brakes fitted for passenger trains. Ajax was withdrawn from service at the beginning of 2015, following the completion of its boiler ticket. It was then stored in Train Story before being sold to the Northampton and Lamport Railway in 2024.	Lined Black	1918	
No. 46447	LMS Ivatt Class 2 2-6-0; 2-6-0	No. 46447 was first allocated the Crewe North, not far from its birthplace of Crewe Works, though moved to Workington within months to replace many elderly LNWR locomotives in the local area. It was moved to various sheds in North Wales and Derbyshire, right up until 1966, when it was sold for scrap to Dai Woodham. It was rescued in 1972 as the 20th locomotive to leave Barry Scrapyard and moved to the Buckinghamshire Railway Centre. No. 46447 later moved to the Isle of Wight in 2008. In 2012, an agreement was made between the East Somerset Railway and the Isle of Wight Steam Railway which saw No. 46447 move to Cranmore in exchange for LB&SCR E1 No. 32110 Burgundy. It arrived at Cranmore in November 2012 and returned to service following restoration in October 2014. It will now run on the ESR for 10 years.	BR Lined Black with the Late Crest	1950	
Juno	Hunslet Austerity; 0-6-0ST	Juno (works No. 3850) was built for work at Hunslet's Ironstone Quarry Railways, but was officially declared redundant only 10 years later and was purchased the following year by the Ivatt Trust and moved to the company's base at Quainton Road. Arriving in the May 2009, it left the Island on loan to the National Railway Museum in late October 2010.	Green	1958	

== Diesel locomotives ==
Three diesel shunters are currently in the custody of the railway, all of which have run a majority of service trains, as opposed to the usual steam-hauled passenger services.

=== Operational ===
Number & Name	Description	History & Current Status	Livery	Date	Photograph
Operational
No. 235 Mavis	Andrew Barclay 4wD Shunter	Built by the same company that produced Ajax, No. 235 was used in the Army for many years before being placed on static display in the NAM with the "Austerities". It came to the Isle of Wight under the same agreement that saw WD198 return to service for use there, and in 2008 became a member of the Wight Locomotive Society's extensive steam and diesel fleet and now works on maintenance trains year round.	Dark Green	1945	
No. D2059 Edward	British Rail Class 03 0-6-0DM	After ending its career with British Railways in 1988, D2059 was selected to become a back-up engine, taking over from a steam service in the case of an emergency. It was initially selected due to having the appropriate brake equipment required by all engines on the railway in order to pull passenger trains, though has mostly worked on freight trains as very few failures have occurred over the years.	BR Black with Late Crest	1959	
No. D2179 Clive	British Rail Class 03 0-6-0DM	Worked on the Isle of Wight along with D2059. This loco has a cut-down cab owing to the low tunnels at Ryde. This engine was the last 03 to work for a main-line company, before being preserved.	Network South East	1962	
No. D2554 Nuclear Fred	British Rail Class 05 0-6-0DM	D2554 spent the first ten years of its career on the Western Region of British Railways, though it was transferred to the Southern Region and the Isle of Wight in 1966, as it was allocated to Ryde Depot for work on the island's newly instated electrification policy. It left the island network for the steam railway in 1984, though has only worked demonstration freights and service trains, as it is not fitted with air brakes. Nuclear Fred has not run since 2005, but in early 2011 work started to see what needed doing to return it to service. The fuel pump was known to be faulty so was sent away for reconditioning. The locomotive was started for the first time in October 2011 and work continues.	BR Green with Late Crest	1956	

== Multiple Units ==
Number & Name	Description	History & Current Status	Livery	Date	Photograph
Operational
Drewry Railcar No.2	Drewry Car Company railcars	The Ryde Pier Petrol Tram was built in 1927 by Drewry. It was withdrawn in 1969 when the tramway closed. Later it took part in ‘the Move’ of the IOWSR in 1971. It underwent restoration work, and is now running on the IWSR on Light Blue Timetable days in Southern Railway green.	Southern Railway Green	1927	
Stored or static
483007 Jess Harper	British Rail Class 483	The British Rail Class 483 483007, named "Jess Harper," was transferred from the Island Line to the Isle of Wight Steam Railway in 2021 for static display in the carriage shed at Havenstreet Station. The train was originally built in 1940 as London Underground 1938 Stock. The unit was the fourth unit to be transferred to Island in 1989. A medium-term goal of the Steam Railway is to have 483007 operate on the line, either by having propulsion provided by one of the diesel shunters, or by being converted to battery power.	London Transport red	1938	
	Pollard and Sons railcar	The Ryde Pier Electric Tram was built by Merres Pollard and Sons in 1911. It was withdrawn in 1927 and replaced by a petrol tram. In 1980, it was brought for a price of £2 by a private owner and was given to the Isle of Wight Council who cosmetically restored it. It went to the Cothy Bottom Heritage Centre, Newport Quay and the Isle of Wight Bus Museum before being put away out of the public view. In 2018, ownership was transferred to the Isle of Wight Steam Railway (IOWSR).	Ryde Pier Company maroon and white	1911	

== Coaching stock ==
All of the railway's operational coaches have been built to a pre-grouping design. These have been restored by the skilled Havenstreet staff and are the envy of many Southern Region preserved railways.

=== IWR coaches ===
The stock collection includes a small set of original Isle of Wight Railway passenger stock.

Number & Name	Description	History & Current Status	Livery	Date	Photograph
No. 5 - 8	4-wheeled 4-compartment Second	Awaiting restoration, grounded at Havenstreet.	N/A	1864	
No. 10	4-wheeled 3-compartment Composite	Operational, restored in 2017 as part of the television series 'Great Rail restorations With Peter Snow'.	Varnished teak	1864	
No. 21	4-wheeled 3-compartment First	Undergoing restoration.	Varnished teak	1864	
No. 35	4-wheeled 4-compartment Composite	Awaiting restoration, grounded at Havenstreet.	N/A.	1875	~
No. 38	4-wheeled 3-compartment Composite	Awaiting restoration, grounded at Havenstreet.	N/A.	1882	~
No. 39	4-wheeled 4-compartment Second	Awaiting restoration, grounded at Havenstreet.	N/A.	1882	~

=== LB&SCR coaches ===
The stock collection currently has six coaches of the former LB&SCR, the earliest built in 1896.

Number & Name	Description	History & Current Status	Livery	Date	Photograph
No. 2343	4-wheeled 5-compartment Third	Operational	Southern Railway Green	1896	
No. 4115	4-wheeled 3-compartment Brake Third	Restored in July 2018.	Southern Railway Green	1896	
No. 2403	Bogie 8-compartment Third	The work to fully restore this carriage and return it to traffic was completed at the end of July 2013.	Southern Railway Malachite Green	1903	
No. 2416	Bogie 9-compartment Third	Operational	Southern Railway Malachite Green	1916	
No. 4168	Bogie 5-compartment Brake Third	Operational	Southern Railway Malachite Green	1922	
No. 6349	Bogie 8-compartment Composite	Operational	Southern Railway Malachite Green	1924	

=== LC&DR coaches ===
The London, Chatham and Dover Railway's role in the south of England ensured an ample collection of stock for the owning groups.

Number & Name	Description	History & current status	Livery	Date	Photograph
No. 6376	6-wheeled First (later converted)	Awaiting restoration, body only.	N/A	1886	
No. 6378	4-wheeled 4-compartment Composite	Operational	Southern Railway Green	1886	
No. 6369	4-wheeled Saloon Composite	Operational, part of push-pull set 484	Southern Railway Green	1887	
N/A	Bogie 8-compartment Third	Awaiting Restoration, grounded at Havenstreet as a source of spares.	N/A	N/A	
No. 2515	4-wheeled 5-compartment Third	Operational	Southern Railway Green	1894	
No. 2418	Bogie 7-compartment Third	Stored, grounded in two-halves at Havenstreet.	N/A.	1895	
No. 2426	Bogie 7-compartment Third	Stored, grounded half body only.	N/A	1895	
No. 4112	4-wheeled Saloon Brake Third	Operational, part of push-pull set 484	Southern Railway Green	1898	
No. 4115	Bogie 5-compartment Brake Third	Undergoing restoration	N/A.	1898	
No. 4116	Bogie 5-compartment Brake Third	Stored, grounded at Havenstreet.	N/A	1898	
No. 4134	4-wheeled 4-compartment Brake Third	Stored, grounded at Havenstreet	N/A	1898	

=== SE&CR coaches ===
An amalgamation of LC&DR and SER, the South Eastern and Chatham Railway also contributed to the Island Line's working stock.

Number & Name	Description	History & current status	Livery	Date	Photograph
No. 4145	Bogie 4-compartment Brake Third	Awaiting overhaul to repair underframe. Birdcage lookout removed when moved to IoW.	BR Crimson	1911	
No. 4149	Bogie 4-compartment Brake Third	Operational. Birdcage lookout removed when moved to IoW.	Southern Railway Green	1911	
No. 6375	Bogie Saloon Composite	Operational; returned to service in 2021.	Southern Railway Malachite Green	1911	

=== MSJ&AR coaches ===
Number & Name	Description	History & current status	Livery	Date	Photograph
No. 6359	4-wheeled 4-compartment Composite	Grounded body, awaiting restoration.	N/A	1880	

=== NLR coaches ===
Number & Name	Description	History & current status	Livery	Date	Photograph
No. 6336	4-wheeled 4-compartment Composite	Operational.	Southern Railway Green	1864	

=== Coach under-frames ===
The Railway uses various under-frames from donor vehicles to place coach bodies on top.

Origin	Number & Name	Description	History & current status	Livery	Date	Photograph
LNWR	No. 3061	Bogie Third corridor	Stored, Under frame only. Has body of LCDR 4-wheeled 4-compartment Brake Third No.4134 temporarily placed on it.	N/A	1907	
LSWR	No. 752	Bogie Ironclad Third corridor	Stored, Under frame and body separate. Underframe has body of SECR Bogie 4-compartment Brake Third No. 4149 temporarily placed on it.	N/A	1924	
LSWR	No. 353	Bogie Third corridor	Operational, underframe only. Converted to rail carrier.	N/A	1935	
SR	No. 1019	Bogie Maunsell Third corridor	Stored, underframe only. No body present on frames.	N/A	1933	
SR	No. 1750	4-wheeled Covered Carriage Truck	Operational, underframe and body separate. Underframe has body of NLR 4-wheeled 4-compartment Composite No. 6336 permanently placed on it, and has been modified to accommodate this. Body is stored at Havenstreet.	N/A	1938	
SR	No. 4589	Bogie General Utility Van	Under restoration, underframe only. Under-frame will have body of LCDR Bogie 5-compartment Brake Third No. 4115 permanently placed on it, under-frame has been shortened by 5 feet to accommodate this.	N/A	1938	
SR	No. 1783	4-wheeled Parcels and Miscellaneous Van	Operational, underframe and body separate. Underframe has body of LCDR 4-wheeled 4-compartment Composite No. 6378 permanently placed on it, and has been modified to accommodate this. Body is stored at Havenstreet.	N/A	1942	
SR	No. 1720	4-wheeled Parcels and Miscellaneous Van	Operational, underframe only. Underframe has body of LCDR 4-wheeled Saloon Brake Third No. 4112 permanently placed on it, and has been modified to accommodate this.	N/A	1943	
SR	No.1533	4-wheeled Parcels and Miscellaneous Van	Operational, underframe only. Underframe has body of LCDR 4-wheeled Saloon Composite No. 6369 permanently placed on it, and has been modified to accommodate this. Body is stored away from the railway.	N/A	1947	
SR	No. 4605	Bogie General Utility Van	Operational, underframe only. Underframe has body of LBSCR Bogie 8-compartment Third No. 2403 permanently placed on it, and has been modified to accommodate this.	N/A	1949	
SR	No. 1669	4-wheeled Parcels and Miscellaneous Van	Operational, underframe only. Underframe has body of LBSCR 4-wheeled 3-compartment Brake Third No. 4115 permanently placed on it, and has been modified to accommodate this.	N/A	1950	
SR	No. 1617	4-wheeled Parcels and Miscellaneous Van	Operational, underframe and body separate. Underframe has body of LBSCR 4-wheeled 5-compartment Third No. 2343 permanently placed on it, and has been modified to accommodate this. Body is stored at Havenstreet.	N/A	1950	
SR	No. 1497	4-wheeled Parcels and Miscellaneous Van	Operational, Under frame and body separate. Under-frame has body of LCDR 4-wheeled 5-compartment Third No.2515 permanently placed on it, under-frame has been modified to accommodate this.	N/A	1951	
BR	No. 740232	Pipe Wagon / 4w 5-plank Open	Stored, underframe only and in store off-site carrying a carriage body.	N/A	1949	
BR	No. 741382	Pipe Wagon / 4w 5-plank Open	Stored, underframe only and in store off-site carrying a carriage body.	N/A	1955	
BR	No. 741157	Pipe Wagon / 4w 5-plank Open	Stored, underframe only and in store off-site carrying a carriage body.	N/A	1955	
BR	No. 741934	Pipe Wagon / 4w 5-plank Open	Stored, underframe only and in store off-site carrying a carriage body.	N/A	1961	

=== Southern Railway Vans ===
The Railway has complete SR Vans stored ready to be used as donor vehicles, or are currently operational on the railway.

Number & Name	Description	History & current status	Livery	Date	Photograph
No. 2373	4-wheeled Covered Carriage Truck	Operational.	BR Green	1931	
No. 1134	4-wheeled Parcels and Miscellaneous Van	Operational.	BR Maroon	1936	
No. 1930	4-wheeled Parcels and Miscellaneous Van	Under restoration, being converted into a storage van for locomotives.	N/A	1938	
No. 210	Bogie Full Brake	Stored, possible future use as chassis for a bogie vehicle.	N/A	1939	
No. 1350	4-wheeled Parcels and Miscellaneous Van	Under restoration to be used as chassis for a 4-wheel vehicle.	N/A	1939	
No. 1803	4-wheeled Parcels and Miscellaneous Van	Stored, possible future use as chassis for a 4-wheel vehicle.	BR Green	1942	
No. 1692	4-wheeled Parcels and Miscellaneous Van	Stored, possible future use as chassis for a 4-wheel vehicle.	N/A	1943	
No. 4600	Bogie General Utility Van	Stored, possible future use as chassis for a bogie vehicle.	N/A	1949	
No.1566	4-wheeled Parcels and Miscellaneous Van	Stored, possible future use as chassis for a 4-wheel vehicle.	N/A	1950	
No. 1603	4-wheeled Parcels and Miscellaneous Van	Stored, possible future use as chassis for a 4-wheel vehicle.	BR Green	1950	

== Goods wagons ==
=== Brake vans ===
Origin	Number	Type	Notes	Photograph
LSWR	56046	4w Brake Van	Operational.	
SR	55724	4w Brake Van	Operational.	
SR	55710	4w Brake Van	Awaiting restoration.	
SR	993853	Shark 4w Brake Van	Operational.	

=== Covered goods vans ===
Origin	Number	Type	Notes	Photograph
-	-	4w Non-Vent Van	Awaiting restoration, body only.	
IoWR	59	4w Non-Vent Van	Awaiting restoration, body only.	
IoWR	86	4w Non-Vent Van	Awaiting restoration, body only.	
IoWR	87	4w Non-Vent Van	Awaiting restoration, body only.	
LBSCR	46923	4w Non-Vent Van	Operational.	
LBSCR	46924	4w Cattle Van	Operational, converted in 1935 to a Passenger Luggage Van	
BR	3705B	Type A Container	Under restoration.	

=== Open goods wagons ===
Origin	Number	Type	Notes	Photograph
SECR	62888	4w 4-plank Open	Operational.	
LBSCR	60579	4w 1-plank Open	Operational.	
SR	27766	4w 4-plank Open	Operational.	
SR	27744	4w 4-plank Open	Awaiting restoration.	
SR	27834	4w 5-plank Open	Operational.	
SR	28345	4w 4-plank Open	Operational.	
SR	27910	4w 8-plank Open	Awaiting restoration.	
SR	27730	4w 5-plank Open	Operational.	
BR	483733	4w 5-plank Open	Operational.	
BR	483700	4w 5-plank Open	Operational.	
BR	27936 (fictitious)	4w 5-plank Open	Operational, the underframe of B 483701 was used to form the base to make a replica of a southern railway 13-ton, 8-plank coal wagon.	
BR	483725	4w 5-plank Open	Operational.	
BR	450157	Lowfit 4w 1-plank Open	Operational.	

=== Flat wagons, bolster wagons and Rail and Sleeper wagons ===
Origin	Number	Type	Notes	Photograph
LBSCR	59043	4w Single Bolster	Operational.	
LBSCR	59038	4w Single Bolster	Awaiting restoration, future use uncertain.	
LBSCR	59050	4w Single Bolster	Operational.	
LBSCR	59049	4w Single Bolster	Awaiting restoration.	
LBSCR	59045	4w Single Bolster	Operational.	
SECR	61056	4w Machinery Flat	Operational.	
LNER	263276	4w Machinery Flat	Operational.	
BR	900103	4w Trolley Flat	Awaiting restoration.	
BR	451341	Single Bolster	Operational.	
BR	452219	Runner Wagon	Operational.	
BR	452715	Single Bolster	Operational.	
BR	453255	Runner Wagon	Operational.	
BR	453374	Single Bolster	Operational.	

=== Tank wagons ===
Origin	Number	Type	Notes	Photograph
PO	1343	4w Class B Oil Tank	Awaiting restoration.	

=== Ballast wagons ===
Origin	Number	Type	Notes	Photograph
BR	993103	Dogfish 4w Steel Hopper	Operational.	
BR	992804	Dogfish 4w Steel Hopper	Operational.	
LT	63437	Herring 4w Steel Hopper	Operational.	
LT	63435	Herring 4w Steel Hopper	Operational.	

=== Cranes and other special use wagons ===
Origin	Number	Type	Notes	Photograph
-	-	4w Manual Crane	Stored, on display in the car park at Havenstreet railway station.	
MR	429	6w Manual Crane	Under restoration.	
LSWR	429 SM	4w Match Truck	Under restoration, used for MR 6w Manual Crane 429	
