= List of LB&SCR A1 class locomotives =

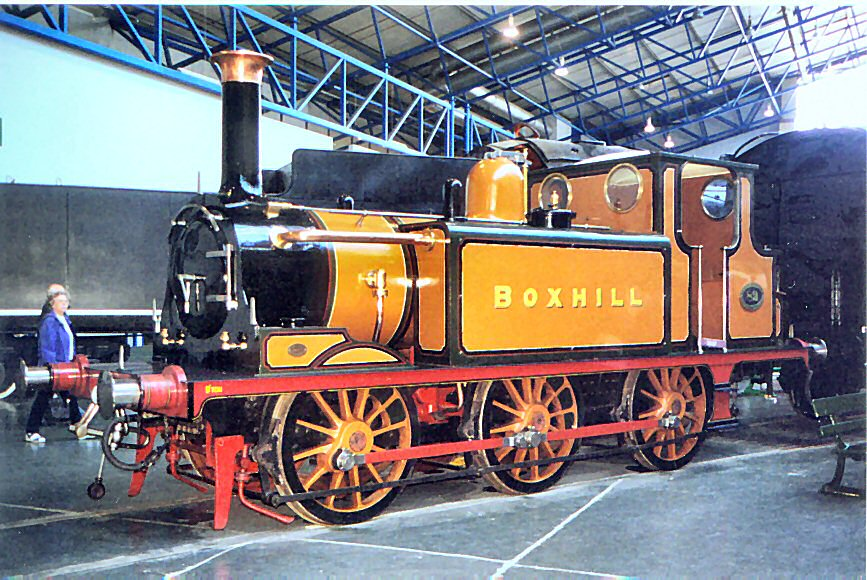
Boxhill

Below are the names and numbers of the steam locomotives that comprised the LB&SCR Class A1/A1X, which ran on the London, Brighton and South Coast Railway, and latterly the Southern Railway network. The original names mainly denoted various places served by the LB&SCR.

== Fleet ==
The Numbers/Names in Green are the preserved members.

Original LBSC Number and Name	Renumbered and Renamed	Into service	Notes	Disposal
35 Morden	635, B635, 2635, 377S "Loco Works Brighton", 377S Brighton Works, DS377 Brighton Works, 32635 Brighton Works	1 June 1878	Rebuilt to A1X April 1922	To Departmental Stock in 1947, withdrawn March 1963 and scrapped at Eastleigh
36 Bramley	Pauling & Co 88	8 June 1878		Sold to Pauling & Co., September 1902. Used in the construction of the Northolt - High Wycombe extension of the Great Central Railway's Chiltern Line. Scrapped 1909.
37 Southdown	637 "Locomotive Dept. Battersea"	6 May 1878		Sold for £1,200 to the Admiralty in February 1908. Used at Grangemouth, sold to Dalmore Distillery, Invergordon. Scrapped August 1921.
38 Millwall	638, 638 "Loco Dept.", 8 Dido	9 June 1878		Sold for £1,200 to the Admiralty in February 1918. To Glen Albin Distillery, Inverness. Sold for £470 to Shropshire and Montgomeryshire Railway in November 1923. Withdrawn in 1930s, scrapped at Kinnerley, October 1934.
39 Denmark	Pauling & Co 87	18 May 1878		Sold for £670 to Pauling & Co., July 1902. Used in the construction of the Northolt - High Wycombe extension of the Great Central Railway's Chiltern Line. Scrapped October 1909.
40 Brighton	11, W11 Newport, 2640, 32640	10 March 1878	Rebuilt to A1X August 1918	Sold for £600 to Isle of Wight Central Railway in January 1902. To Southern Railway on Grouping and BR(S) on Nationalisation. Withdrawn 21 September 1963. Sold to Butlin's and initially displayed at Pwllheli. Loaned to Isle of Wight Locomotive Society in 1972 and sold to them for £3,500 in 1976. Preserved.
41 Piccadilly		2 June 1877		Withdrawn June 1902, sold for £125 to George Cohen & Co. and scrapped at Redhill.
42 Tulsehill	642 Tulsehill, 642S "Locomotive Department", 642	20 June 1877		Withdrawn May 1925, scrapped.
43 Gipsyhill	643 Gipsyhill, 643, B643, 2 Portishead, 5 Portishead	15 June 1877	Rebuilt to A1X September 1919	Sold for £785 to the Weston, Clevedon and Portishead Light Railway in December 1925. To GWR in 1940 and BR(W) in 1948. Withdrawn January 1950, scrapped at Swindon in March 1954.
44 Fulham	644 Fulham; 644, B644, 2644, 32644	14 June 1877	Rebuilt to A1X November 1912	Withdrawn April 1951, scrapped at Ashford.
45 Merton	645 Merton	12 June 1877		Withdrawn July 1904. The last Terrier to be withdrawn by the LBSCR. sold for £125 to George Cohen & Co. and scrapped at Redhill.
46 Newington	646 Newington, 734, 2, W2, W8 Freshwater, 32646, W8 Freshwater	10 January 1877	Rebuilt to A1X March 1932	Sold to LSWR March 1903. Sold for £900 to Freshwater, Yarmouth and Newport Railway in March 1914. To Southern Railway on 1 September 1923 and BR(S) on Nationalisation. Withdrawn 1963. Sold for £750 to Sadler Railcar Company, Droxford. Sold to Brickwoods Brewery, Portsmouth in May 1966. Displayed on a plinth outside the Hayling Billy pub, Hayling Island until June 1979. Donated by Whitbread (who had taken over Brickwoods) to the Isle of Wight Locomotive Society. Preserved.
47 Cheapside	647 Cheapside, 647, B647, 2647, 32647	15 December 1876	Rebuilt to A1X January 1912	Withdrawn October 1951 due to broken crank axle, scrapped at Eastleigh.
48 Leadenhall	648 Leadenhall	9 December 1876		Withdrawn August 1901, sold for £125 to George Cohen & Co. and scrapped at Redhill.
49 Bishopsgate	649 Bishopsgate, Pauling & Co 79	2 December 1876		Sold for £670 to Pauling & Co., June 1902. Used in the construction of the Northolt - High Wycombe extension of the Great Central Railway's Chiltern Line. Sold for scrap October 1909.
50 Whitechapel	650 Whitechapel, B650, W9 Fishbourne, 515S, DS515 "C & W Lancing Works", 32650, 10 Sutton	14 December 1876	Rebuilt to A1X May 1920	To Departmental Stock April 1937, returned to Capital Stock November 1951. Withdrawn November 1963. Sold to the Municipal Borough of Sutton and Cheam, via K&ESR. Preserved.
51 Rotherhithe		14 December 1876		Withdrawn February 1901, sold for £125 to George Cohen & Co. and scrapped at Redhill.
52 Surrey	652 Surrey, Pauling & Co 90	14 December 1876		Sold for £670 to Pauling & Co., September 1902. Used in the construction of the Northolt - High Wycombe extension of the Great Central Railway's Chiltern Line. Sold to La Plata Tramways, Argentina, 1909.
53 Ashtead	653 Ashtead, 653, B653, 4, 6	8 December 1875	Rebuilt to A1X May 1912	Sold to Weston, Clevedon and Portishead Light Railway for £800 in April 1937. To GWR in 1940 and BR(W) in 1948. Withdrawn January 1948 and scrapped.
54 Waddon	654 Waddon, 654, 751, A751, 1751, 680S, DS680 "C & W Lancing Works"	16 February 1876		Sold for £670 to Sheppey Light Railway in September 1904, to SECR the same year and Southern Railway at Grouping. To Departmental Stock 22 December 1932. Withdrawn 31 May 1962 and presented to the Canada Railway Historical Association. To Canada on MV Tautra 23 August 1963. On display at Canada National Railway Museum, Delson, Quebec. Preserved.
55 Stepney	655 Stepney, 655, B655, 2655, 32655	21 December 1875	Rebuilt to A1X October 1912	Sold for £750 to the Bluebell Railway 17 May 1960. Preserved.
56 Shoreditch	656 Shoreditch	18 November 1875		Sold for £125 to George Cohen & Co., August 1903. Scrapped at Redhill.
57 Thames	657 Thames, Pauling & Co 64	10 January 1876		Sold for £670 to Pauling & Co., May 1902. Used in the construction of the Northolt - High Wycombe extension of the Great Central Railway's Chiltern Line. Sold to La Plata Tramways, Argentina, 1909
58 Wandle	658 Wandle	11 November 1875		Withdrawn February 1902, sold for £125 to George Cohen & Co. and scrapped at Redhill
59 Cheam	659 Cheam, 659, B659, 2659, 32659, DS681	16 October 1875	Rebuilt to A1X December 1921	To Departmental Stock in 1953. Withdrawn 8 June 1963, scrapped at Eastleigh, 27 June 1963.
60 Ewell	660 Ewell	6 November 1875		Withdrawn December 1902, sold for £125 to George Cohen & Co. and scrapped at Redhill
61 Sutton	661 Sutton, 661, B661, 2661, 32661	27 October 1875	Rebuilt to A1X January 1912	Withdrawn April 1963, scrapped at Eastleigh September 1963. The last Terrier to be scrapped by British Railways.
62 Martello	662 Martello, 662, B662, 2662, 32662	27 October 1875	Rebuilt to A1X December 1912	Withdrawn November 1963. Sold to Butlin's, initially displayed at Ayr, to Bressingham in February 1971. Preserved.
63 Preston	663 Preston, 663, B663	7 October 1875	Rebuilt to A1X May 1913	Withdrawn March 1925 still in umber livery and scrapped.
64 Kemptown	664 Kemptown	20 June 1874		Withdrawn January 1903, sold for £125 to George Cohen & Co. and scrapped at Redhill.
65 Tooting		29 August 1874		Withdrawn February 1901, sold for £125 to George Cohen & Co. and scrapped at Redhill.
66 Hatcham		21 August 1874		Withdrawn February 1901, sold for £125 to George Cohen & Co. and scrapped at Redhill.
67 Brixton	667 Brixton, 667, Ashgate	6 August 1874		Sold for £1,500 to Messrs. Mylon & Smith (or Rylon & Smith), Sheffield in April 1920. Sold to Grassmore Colliery, Chesterfield and named Ashgate. Scrapped 1935.
68 Clapham	668 Clapham, 735, E735; 735	5 August 1874		Sold for £500 to LSWR in March 1903. To Southern Railway on Grouping. Withdrawn December 1936, scrapped at Ashford.
69 Peckham	10, W10, W10 Cowes	9 July 1874	Rebuilt to A1X April 1930	Hire purchased for £700 by Isle of Wight Central Railway on 18 April 1900. To Southern Railway on Grouping. Withdrawn May 1936. Scrapped at Eastleigh March 1949.
70 Poplar	3 Bodiam, 3, 32670, 3 Bodiam	4 December 1872	Rebuilt to A1X April 1943	Sold for £650 to RVR in May 1901. To BR in 1948, withdrawn 1963, sold to Kent & East Sussex Preservation Society in April 1964. Acquired by The Terrier Trust 1995 for use on the K&ESR. Preserved.
71 Wapping	671 Wapping, 5 Rolvenden	12 September 1872		Hired for construction of the Sheppey Light Railway. Sold for £700 to RVR in January 1905. Withdrawn by 1932, scrapped in 1938.
72 Fenchurch	72 Newhaven Harbour Company, 636, B636, 2636, 32636	9 September 1872	Rebuilt to A1X April 1913	Sold to Newhaven Harbour Company, 27 June 1898. Acquired by Southern Railway in 1926. Withdrawn 4 January 1964. Sold for £750 to Bluebell Railway. Preserved.
73 Deptford	673 Deptford, 673, 1	12 October 1872	Rebuilt to A1X February 1912	Sold for £1,300 to Edge Hill Light Railway April 1919. Scrapped by James Friswell & Co., Banbury April 1946.
74 Shadwell	674 Shadwell, 674, 2	12 October 1872		Sold for £1,750 to Edge Hill Light Railway July 1920. Scrapping details uncertain, possibly similar to No. 73.
75 Blackwall	9, W9	2 December 1872		Hire purchased for £800 by Isle of Wight Central Railway, March 1899, to Southern Railway on Grouping. Withdrawn and scrapped in April 1927.
76 Hailsham		July 1877		Withdrawn April 1903. Sold for £125 to George Cohen & Co., scrapped at Redhill.
77 Wonersh	677, B677, W3 Carisbrooke, W13 Carisbrooke, 2677, 32677	21 July 1880	Rebuilt to A1X November 1911	Withdrawn September 1959, scrapped at Eastleigh, April 1960
78 Knowle	678, B678, W4, W14 Bembridge, 2678, 32678	23 July 1880	Rebuilt to A1X November 1911	Withdrawn October 1963. Sold to Butlin's, initially displayed at Minehead. Sold to West Somerset Railway in 1975. Sold to Resco (Railways) Ltd in April 1983. Acquired by The Terrier Trust for use on the K&ESR. Preserved.
79 Minories	679	6 July 1880	Rebuilt to A1X January 1912	Sold to the Admiralty for £1,200 January 1918. Used at Catterick Camp (May 1919) and Chatham Dockyard (April 1920). Scrapped at Chatham, October 1933.
80 Bookham	680, B680	29 July 1880	Rebuilt to A1X April 1912	Withdrawn December 1925, scrapped at Brighton.
81 Beulah	81, 681, 7 Hecate	19 July 1880		Ran as a 2-4-0 for a time while used on auto-train services. Sold for £1,200 to the Admiralty January 1918. Later sold to Dalmore Distillery, Invergordon. Sold to Shropshire and Montgomeryshire Railway 1923. Withdrawn from use at Kinnerley in the 1930s, scrapped October 1934.
82 Boxhill	82, 682, "Loco Dept. Brighton", 380S "Loco Works Brighton"	20 August 1880		Converted to 2-4-0T March 1905 for auto-train trials. Restored to 0-6-0T 1913. To Departmental Service stock. Withdrawn August 1946 and restored to LBSC livery. Preserved.
83 Earlswood	83, 683, 9 Daphne	8 September 1880		Sold for £1,200 to the Admiralty in January 1918. To Dalmore Distillery, Invergordon in 1922. Sold for £470 to Shropshire and Montgomeryshire Railway November 1923, withdrawn 1931. Purchased by Southern Railway in 1932 as a source of spares. Scrapped at Eastleigh April 1949.
84 Crowborough	12, W12, W12 Ventnor	8 September 1880	Rebuilt to A1X July 1916	Sold for £725 to Isle of Wight Central Railway November 1903. To Southern Railway on Grouping. Withdrawn October 1935, scrapped at Eastleigh, March 1949.

== Sources ==
- Haresnape, Brian (1985). Stroudley Locomotives. Shepperton: Ian Allan Ltd. ISBN 0-7110-1391-8.
- Middlemass, Tom (1995). Stroudley and his Terriers. York: Pendragon. ISBN 1-899816-00-3.
- Bradley, D L (1969). The Locomotives of the London Brighton & South Coast Railway Part 1. London: RCTS.
