= US Naval Base 18 =

US Navy base during World War I

- Caledonian Canal, Inverness, Scotland

Site information
- Type: Former Military base

Location

Site history
- Built: 1917
- Demolished: ~1920s

US Naval Base 18 was a United States Navy base located in the Caledonian Canal in Inverness, Scotland, during the First World War.

== Before the war ==
Constructed between 1803 and 1822, the Caledonian Canal was built to allow vessels to bypass the North Coast of Scotland via Loch Ness. However, by the time it was completed, the canal was largely obsolete due to advances in shipbuilding, leaving the canal too small and the threat of the Napoleonic French Navy being defeated at Waterloo making it unnecessary for the deployment of Royal Navy vessels. Following completion, the canal has been primarily used by smaller vessels.

Prior to the base being built, the location was formerly home of the Glen Albyn malt whisky distillery, which had been mothballed some 30 years prior.

== First World War operations ==
The United States entered the First World War on 6 April 1916, and after a year, entered the North Sea campaign, eventually expanding into the North Sea Mine Barrage, a minelaying operation between the Orkney Islands and Norway. In order to assist with this, the United States Navy had to build bases and factories to construct anti-submarine sea mines, as it was too risky to construct them in country and ship them over as complete units, due to the U-boat threat. In order to speed up transit times across the Atlantic Ocean, the United States Navy established a transshipment point at Corpach, at the southern end of the Caledonian Canal, with partially completed mines being put on Royal Navy barges and transported up to the Muirtown Basin to complete assembly. The United States Navy used two sites along the North Coast of Scotland, USNB 18 at Inverness, and USNB 17, at the Dalmore Distillery in Alness, which was heavily damaged in a post-war mine explosion in 1920.

Due to the complexity of the operation, the site needed an extensive rail network, leading to a branchline off the Far North Line coming into the canal-side, as well as a large shunting yard being temporarily laid over the playground of Merkinch Primary School. Due to a steel shortage, rails were requisitioned from the Buckie and Portessie branchline, which had been closed in 1915 due to it being a financial loss to operate during the war. As the Canal entrance was too narrow, the finished product had to be moved to the harbour by rail, this was done by an London, Brighton and South Coast Railway A1 class 'Terrier' No.38 "Millwall" which was lent by the Admiralty. The curvature of the former line is still visible to this day, as the outline makes up the edge of the current Carse industrial estate.

In addition to the factory and its railway, the base also hosted its own fire brigade, in order to alleviate pressure from the local fire brigade and massively reduce response times should a fire have occurred. As well as that, the base had its own theater. The barracks were based in the granaries of the distillery which had been turned into dormitories.

== American influence on the locals ==
When the Americans joined the fight against the German Empire, they were warmly received in Inverness by the locals. The sailors introduced them to American football and started a short lived craze of baseball. The American sailors were also noted to have put on a Christmas show for the local schoolchildren at the Rose Street Drill Hall, giving out Christmas presents, as well as contributing funds to Merkinch School for playground equipment.

However, relations soon soured after Armistice Day, as local men who had been fighting in the trenches in France, came home to find their girlfriends and wives being courted by American sailors, culminating in a riot on 25 April 1919, with American sailors being kettled down the street by the returning locals, and back to the base, after which they were confined to the barracks, leading to local businesses that they would frequent taking a hit in profits.

Roughly 80 Highland women were noted to have married US sailors and moved to the United States, a majority likely being Invernessian.

== Decommissioning and post-war ==
After the conflict ended, the United States set about cleaning up the minefield they had laid between Orkney and Norway, however, almost half the mines were never recovered. Following this, the base was decommissioned and all equipment was removed. The distillery was returned to Glen Albyn and reopened, before being mothballed again in 1983 and demolished in 1988.

Due to the rapid advances in shipping post First World War, the base was not rebuilt when the US entered the Second World War following the Attack on Pearl Harbor in 1941.

The only surviving buildings of the base are the former sick bay, which, in turn, was the former Muirtown Hotel, at 90 Telford Street, and 40 Telford Street, the Base HQ.

LB&SCR 'Terrier' No.38 "Millwall" remained at the Glen Albyn Distillery, before being sold to the Shropshire and Montgomeryshire Railway for £470 (£24,000 in 2025) in 1923, ultimately being scrapped in 1934.
