= W11 =

W11 may refer to:

== Aircraft ==
- Cierva W.11 Air Horse, a British helicopter
- Hansa-Brandenburg W.11, a German fighter floatplane
- Wolf W-11 Boredom Fighter, an American biplane

== Automobiles ==
- Mercedes-Benz W11, a German roadster
- Mercedes-AMG F1 W11 EQ Performance, a racing car
- Nissan Avenir (W11), a station wagon

== Other uses ==
- British NVC community W11, in the British National Vegetation Classification system
- Cuboctahedron
- LB&SCR A1X Class W11 Newport, a steam locomotive
- London Buses route W11
- W11 Opera, a British opera company renamed to London Youth Opera
- Windows 11, 2021 operating system
- Winning Eleven, a soccer simulation game
- W11, a postcode district in London, England
- World 1-1
