= LB&SCR A1X class 55 Stepney =

Preserved steam locomotive

LB&SCR A1X Class 55 Stepney
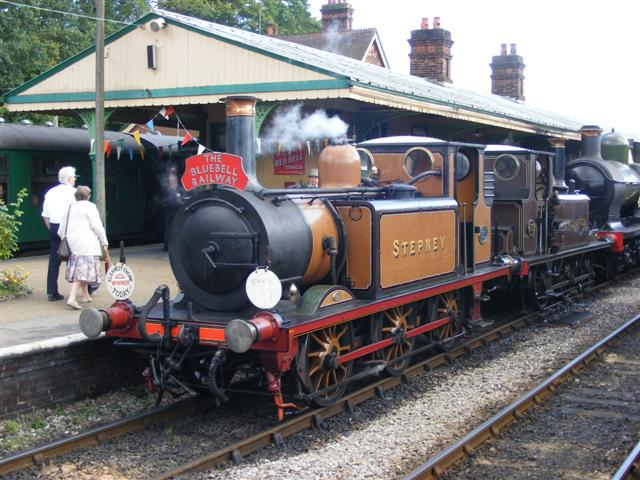
- Stepney at Horsted Keynes with sister engine 672 Fenchurch.
Type and origin
- Power type: Steam
- Designer: William Stroudley
- Builder: Brighton works
- Build date: 21 December 1875; 1912 (rebuilt)
Specifications
- Configuration
  - Whyte: 0-6-0T
  - UIC: C
- Gauge: 4 ft 8 1/2 in (1,435 mm) standard gauge
- Driver dia.: 48 in (1,219 mm)
- Wheelbase: 12 ft (3,658 mm)
- Length: 26 ft 0 1/2 in (7.94 m)
Career
- Operators: London, Brighton and South Coast Railway; Southern Railway; British Railways; Bluebell Railway
- Class: A1X
- Power class: BR: 0P
- Withdrawn: May 1960

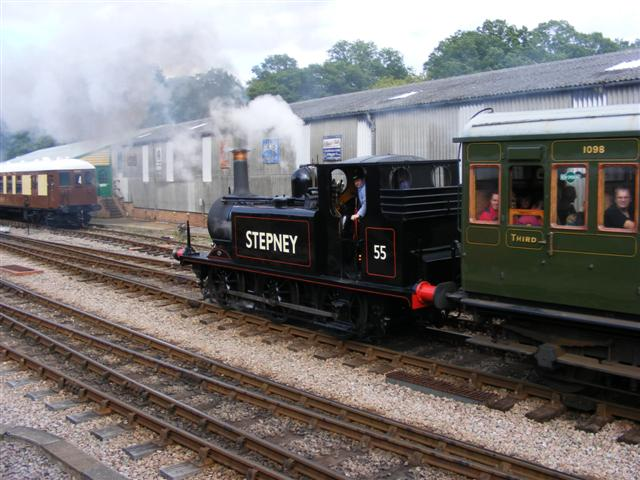
Stepney in Bluebell Black livery

London, Brighton and South Coast Railway A1X Class number 55 Stepney, named after the district of Stepney, is a preserved steam locomotive based at the Bluebell Railway in East and West Sussex, England. Stepney is well known as the first standard gauge engine to be based at the Bluebell Railway, arriving by rail on 17 May 1960. The junior (8 years old and under) membership scheme of the Bluebell Railway Preservation Society is known as the Stepney Club.

Stepney re-entered service on the Bluebell in May 2010 after a fast track overhaul and was used on light duties until its main steam pipe failed in early 2014. Stepney currently wears Stroudley Improved Engine Green, but previously wore the lined black livery that was carried during the first (1960) season on the Bluebell. On 14 January 2012, Stepney made an "only-morning" appearance in BR Lined Black with the "cycling lion" crest and its BR number, 32655, for a special photographic charter. It carried the same BR Lined Black Livery again on 17 April 2012 for another photographic charter, this time though with the later "ferret and dartboard" crest. It returned to "Bluebell Black" in time for its visit to the National Railway Museum's "Railfest" in the first week of June 2012. Stepney is now on static display at the Bluebell railway, awaiting new cylinders and work on the frames and boiler.

== In popular culture ==
Stepney appears in the music video for Tracey Ullman's "Move Over Darling" (1983).

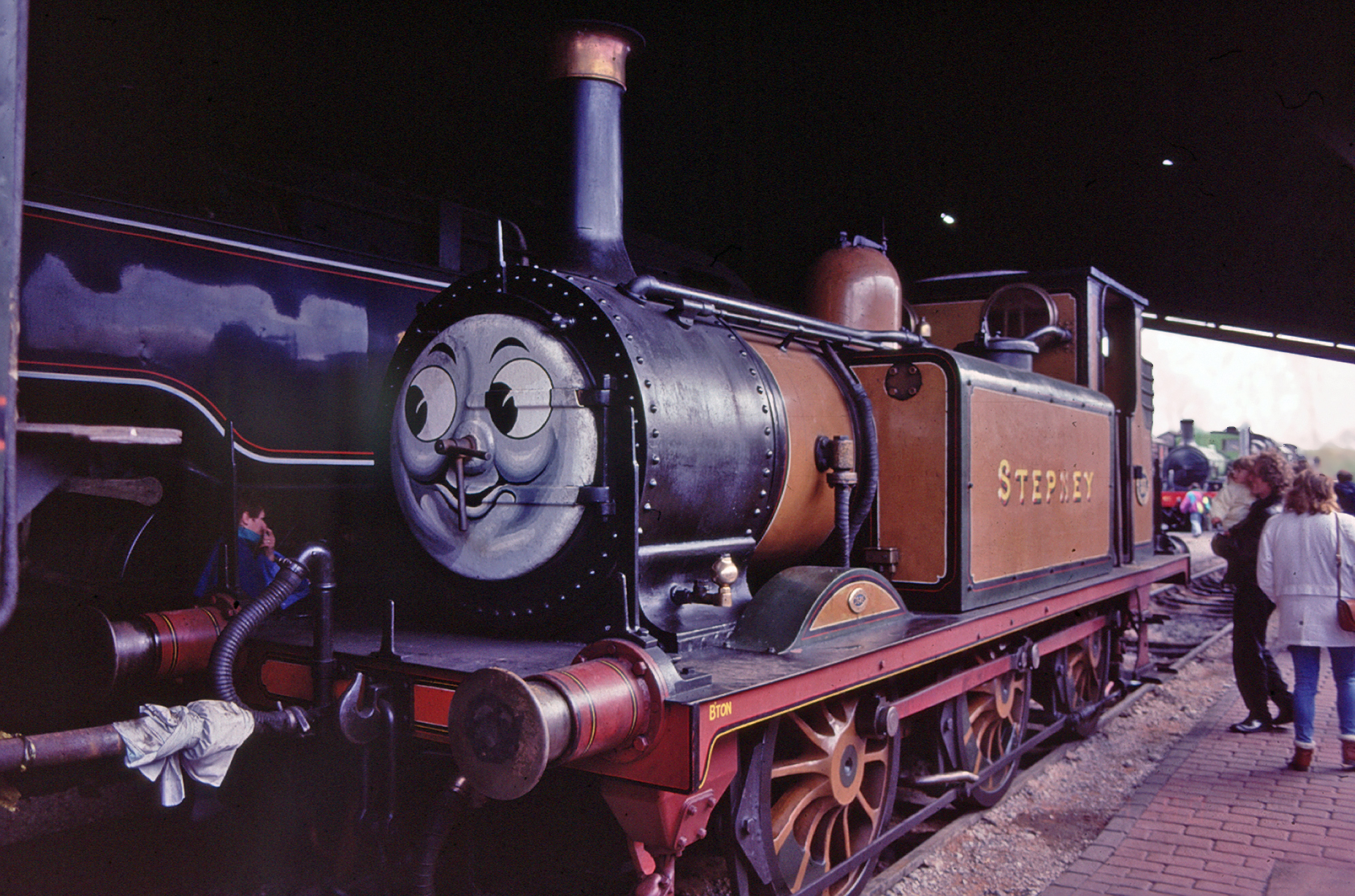

Stepney was featured in The Railway Series book Stepney The "Bluebell" Engine by Wilbert Awdry, as well as its television adaptation Thomas & Friends.

== Models ==
Father H. T. Brown built a 2-inch scale model of the A1X Stepney in 1954, which was exhibited at The Model Railway Exhibition, Westminster, London.
