= LB&SCR A1X Class W8 Freshwater =

Preserved British steam locomotive

W8 Freshwater
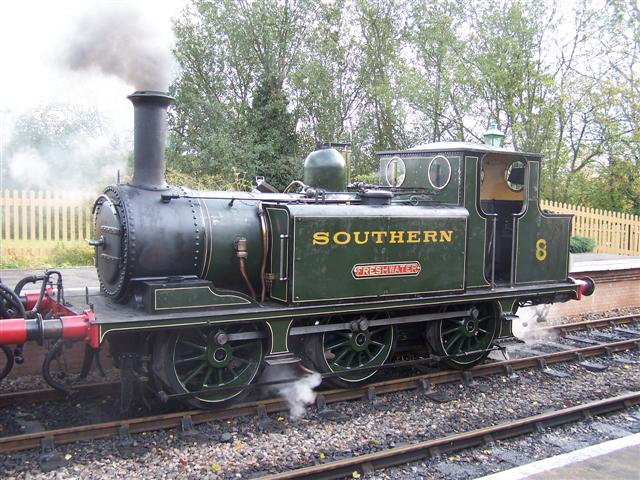
- W8 Freshwater at Kingscote station whilst visiting the Bluebell Railway.
Type and origin
- Power type: Steam
- Designer: William Stroudley
- Builder: LB&SCR Brighton works
- Build date: January 1877
Specifications
- Configuration
  - Whyte: 0-6-0T
  - UIC: C
- Gauge: 4 ft 8 1/2 in (1,435 mm)
- Driver dia.: 48 in (1.22 m)
- Wheelbase: 12 ft (3.66 m)
- Length: 26 ft 0½ in
- Loco weight: 26.85 long tons (27.28 t) (1877–90); 24.35 long tons (24.74 t) (1890–1912); 26.15 long tons (26.57 t) (1912–32); 29.25 long tons (29.72 t) (1932–)
- Fuel type: Coal
- Firebox
  - Grate area: 10.3 ft^{2} (0.96 m^{2}) (1877–90); 10 ft^{2} (0.93 m^{2}) (1890–1912, 1932–); 11.25 ft^{2} (1.045 m^{2}) (1912–32)
- Boiler pressure: 140 psi (0.97 MPa) (1877–1890); 150 psi (1.0 MPa) (1890–)
- Cylinders: Two, inside
- Cylinder size: 13 in × 20 in (330 mm × 510 mm) (1877–94, 1912–); 14 in × 20 in (360 mm × 510 mm) (1894–1912)
Performance figures
- Tractive effort: 8,380 lbf (37.3 kN) (1877–90); 8,980 lbf (39.9 kN) (1890–94, 1912–); 10,415 lbf (46.33 kN) (1894–1912)
Career
- Operators: LB&SCR (1877–1903); LSWR (1903–13); FYNR (1913–22); Southern Railway (1923–47); British Railways (1948–63)
- Class: A1 until April 1932; A1x from April 1932
- Power class: Isle of Wight: A; BR: 0P
- Numbers: 46 (1877–1902); 646 (1902–03); 734 (1903–17); 2 (1917–24); W2 (1924–32); W8 (1932–49); 32646 (1949–)

W8 Freshwater is a Stroudley A1X Terrier class 0-6-0T steam locomotive, which is based at the Isle of Wight Steam Railway.

== History ==
Originally numbered 46, and named Newington it was built by the London, Brighton and South Coast Railway (LB&SCR) at their Brighton works, being delivered in January 1877; the average cost of the 44 locomotives built to this design in the 1874–80 period was £1,875. It is a member of William Stroudley's famous 'Terrier' class, which were officially known as the A Class (altered to A1 Class by D. E. Marsh). The original cylinders were of 13 in (330 mm) bore by 20 in (510 mm) stroke, the boiler had a barrel 7 ft 10 in (2.39 m) long by 3 ft 6 in (1.07 m) diameter, an iron firebox 4 ft 1 in (1.24 m) long with a grate area of 10.3 ft^{2} (0.96 m^{2}), and worked at a pressure of 140 lbf/in^{2} (965 kPa). The coupled wheels were nominally 4 feet (1,219 mm) in diameter, although this could vary from 4 feet 0 1/2 inch (1,232 mm) with new tyres down to 3 feet 11 1/2 inches (1,206 mm) when worn. When new, the brakes had wooden blocks, and could be operated either by steam or by hand. The Westinghouse air brake was fitted at some point between 1879 and 1882, replacing the steam brake; it operated the brakes on both locomotive and train. It was based in South London at Battersea; coal consumption returns of 21 Battersea-based engines for the year ending 31 December 1882 showed that no. 46 ran 21,714 miles (34,945 km) and burned coal at a rate of 22.8 pounds per mile (6.4 kg/km), both figures being slightly below the averages for the 21, which were 24,728 miles (39,796 km) and 23.4 lb/mi (6.6 kg/km) respectively. A new boiler was fitted in 1890, which had a copper firebox with a grate area of 10 ft^{2} (0.93 m^{2}), and the working pressure was increased to 150 lbf/in^{2} (1,034 kPa). New cylinders having a bore of 14 inches (360 mm) were fitted in 1894. In the 1890s, no. 46 was normally used on the Kensington branch. In April 1902, it was transferred to the duplicate list and renumbered 646.

The Axminster and Lyme Regis Railway was authorised in 1899, and the London and South Western Railway (LSWR) was contracted to work the line. The branch was sharply curved, with lightly laid track and severe gradients, so it would only be possible to use small tank locomotives, of which the LSWR had none to spare. Dugald Drummond, the locomotive superintendent of the LSWR, having considered and rejected a new design, approached his opposite number on the LB&SCR, R. J. Billinton, to see if that railway had any spare A1 Class locomotives. Two LSWR representatives rode in a seven-carriage train hauled by no. 668 Clapham of that class, and after they had reported back to Drummond, he offered £600 each for that locomotive and no. 646 Newington. The purchase was sanctioned on 4 March 1903, and on 12 March, both were delivered to Nine Elms locomotive depot on the LSWR. The mileages were 574,266 (no. 646) and 611,070 (no. 668) and the recorded payment was £500 each. They were then moved to Nine Elms works where they were given general repairs and a repaint into LSWR livery (royal green, bordered in brown and lined out in black and white), and were numbered 734 (ex-646) and 735 (ex-668). As part of the repairs, the Westinghouse brake was removed and a vacuum ejector was fitted instead, to work the train brakes; the brakes on the locomotive itself could now only be operated by hand. Following these repairs, the weight in working order (Note: On the LSWR, the weight in working order was taken when "in light steam with 5 cwt of coal in the firebox, 2 1/2 in. of water showing in the glass, full ... tanks and 5 cwt of coal in the ... bunker".) was given as 24.06 long tons (24.45 t). They entered service on 4 April 1903, and until the Lyme Regis branch opened, other duties were found for the two locomotives.

No. 734 spent several weeks on station pilot duties at Guildford, then on the Poole Quay Tramway, and finally sent to Exmouth Junction depot, that being the base for engines working branch lines in east Devon. From there, it was used on local goods services to Budleigh Salterton, Exmouth and Sidmouth. The Lyme Regis branch opened on 24 August 1903, and both nos. 734 and 735 were used from the start on both passenger and goods trains. In winter, only one locomotive was needed for the branch, and they were exchanged weekly, with the one working the branch being kept overnight in a small locomotive shed at Lyme Regis, and the other carrying out local duties in the Exeter area. The LSWR purchased the branch outright on 1 January 1907, and upgraded the line to allow larger locomotives of the LSWR O2 class. Once these began to be used, other duties were found for the two A1s, although they did assist on the Lyme Regis branch until mid-1909. From September 1907, no. 734 was based at Eastleigh for the Bishop's Waltham branch. It was also used at Sidmouth, Yeovil and Fratton. By February 1912, no. 734 was in Eastleigh Works for reboilering. The new boiler was of Drummond design, and smaller: it had a barrel 7 ft 9 1/2 in (2.375 m) long by 3 ft 4 1/2 in (1.029 m) diameter, a firebox 4 ft 0 1/2 in (1.232 m) long with a grate area of 11.25 ft^{2} (1.045 m^{2}), and worked at a pressure of 150 lbf/in^{2} (1,034 kPa). New cylinders were also provided, and these were of 13 in (330 mm) bore by 20 in (510 mm) stroke. Following the rebuild, the weight in working order was 26.15 long tons (26.57 t). It then performed local duties in the Eastleigh area.

The Freshwater, Yarmouth and Newport Railway (FYNR) on the Isle of Wight, which had opened in 1888, had been worked by the neighbouring Isle of Wight Central Railway (IWCR) since 1889. In 1912, the FYNR began to consider working the line themselves, and in November that year gave notice to the IWCR that the working arrangement would cease following the last train on 30 June 1913. Under the conditions of the working agreement, the FYNR was obliged to purchase some of the IWCR rolling stock; the FYNR did take some carriages and wagons, but declined two locomotives that had been offered, and looked elsewhere for locomotives. On 25 June 1913, LSWR no. 734 arrived on the FYNR on hire at £1-6-8d per day, although the LSWR account books do not record receipt of hire payments. It began work on 1 July, and was used on both passenger and goods trains. On 18 December 1913, the FYNR agreed to purchase no. 734 for £900, to be paid in Spring 1914. It was not until February 1917 that the locomotive was given the number 2 and repainted in bright green FYNR livery.

Under the Railways Act 1921, the LB&SCR and LSWR amalgamated with some other large railways at the start of 1923 to form the Southern Railway (SR). A number of smaller railways were also to be absorbed by one or another of the larger companies prior to the actual amalgamation, and these included the IWCR and the FYNR which were to be absorbed by the LSWR. However, the FYNR were unhappy with the terms offered, which were not finally settled until 30 July 1923, and it did not formally become part of the SR until 1 September 1923. In March 1924, the bunker was extended, increasing its capacity to 1 1/2 long tons (1.5 t); the vacuum ejector was removed, with the Westinghouse brake – already in use on all of the other Isle of Wight locomotives – being fitted instead; the locomotive was repainted into SR livery – sage green with black and white lining – and it was renumbered W2, the W prefix denoting Isle of Wight.

It continued working on the line between Newport and Freshwater, and normally shared the duties with no. W10, another A1 class locomotive which the SR had inherited from the IWCR. In January 1927, steam heating apparatus was fitted together with the necessary equipment for motor-train working. In September 1928 it was decided to give names of local significance to all of the locomotives on the Isle of Wight which did not already carry names, and so in October 1928, no. W2 was named Freshwater. In January 1932, the Drummond boiler which had been fitted in 1912 was found to be in need of heavy repairs, and so a boiler of the type used to rebuild the A1 Class to the A1x Class was fitted at Ryde works. This boiler had a single-ring barrel 8 ft 1 1/4 in (2.470 m) long by 3 ft 6 in (1.07 m) diameter, firebox 4 ft 1 in (1.24 m) long with a grate area of 10 ft^{2} (0.93 m^{2}), and worked at a pressure of 150 lbf/in^{2} (1,034 kPa). It returned to traffic in April 1932, having been renumbered W8 and reclassified A1x. It was now primarily used on the line between Merstone and Ventnor West, but occasionally on the Freshwater line. After the outbreak of World War II, no. W8 was stored for a period, but was used on occasion. By September 1945, it had been painted plain black.

At the start of 1948, British Railways (BR) was formed by the amalgamation of the SR with all the other major railways in Great Britain. No. W8 was now one of just two A1x Class locomotives still on the Isle of Wight, the other being no. W13 Carisbrooke, and normally one of these worked the Ventnor West branch whilst the other shunted at Newport. Both were transferred back to the mainland on 4 May 1949, and after repairs at Eastleigh Works, including being renumbered to 32646 (ex-W8) and 32677 (ex-W13) were allocated to Fratton for use on the Hayling Island branch. No. 32646 was later repainted into BR lined black, and occasionally based at other depots such as Brighton and Newhaven, but was allocated to Fratton when the Hayling Island branch closed on 4 November 1963; the locomotive was withdrawn from service the same day. It was then stored at Eastleigh Works "awaiting restoration" along with no. 32650, another A1x.

The Sadler Railcar Company bought no. 32646 for £600, and in November 1964, it was driven from Eastleigh to Droxford for use on the former Meon Valley line. A final journey over this line took place on 13 May 1966.

It was then purchased by the former Portsmouth brewery, Brickwoods, and on 17 May 1966 moved by rail to Wickham, then by road to Hayling Island for display on a plinth outside the Hayling Billy (Note: Hayling Billy, as in "Puffing Billy", was a local name for the Hayling Island line.) public house as a pub sign. There, it was painted in Stroudley yellow livery, and named Newington.

In 1979 it was donated to the Wight Locomotive Society, who had negotiated an agreement with Brickwoods' successors, Whitbread Wessex Ltd. It was repainted green, and on 18 June 1979, was loaded onto a low-loader for return to the Isle of Wight, where it arrived on 25 June; on 9 August 1979, Whitbread formally handed over the locomotive at Havenstreet. There, it was restored as a working locomotive, given SR green livery, numbered 8 Freshwater and steamed on 21 June 1981.

== Preservation ==
Having arrived in June 1979, it returned to steam on 21 June 1981 after a rapid overhaul.

Performing the task that it was designed for when in service at the start of its lifespan, it has been a member of the locomotive fleet, and a new boiler commissioned in 1998 for W8 Freshwater, built at a cost of £35,000 by Israel Newton of Bradford.

After a rapid overhaul in 2009, W8 Freshwater is in service.

== Livery ==
=== LB&SCR ===
- Stroudley's Improved Engine Green.

=== FYNR ===
- Light Green

=== Southern Railway ===
- Maunsell lined Olive Green.
- Malachite Green with Sunshine lettering.

=== British Railway ===
- BR Standard Mixed-Traffic Black livery with red and white lining.

=== Preservation ===
- FYNR Light Green (FYNR No.2)
- Southern Railway Maunsell lined Olive Green. (SR W8 Freshwater)
