= LB&SCR A1X Class W11 Newport =

Preserved British steam locomotive

W11 Newport
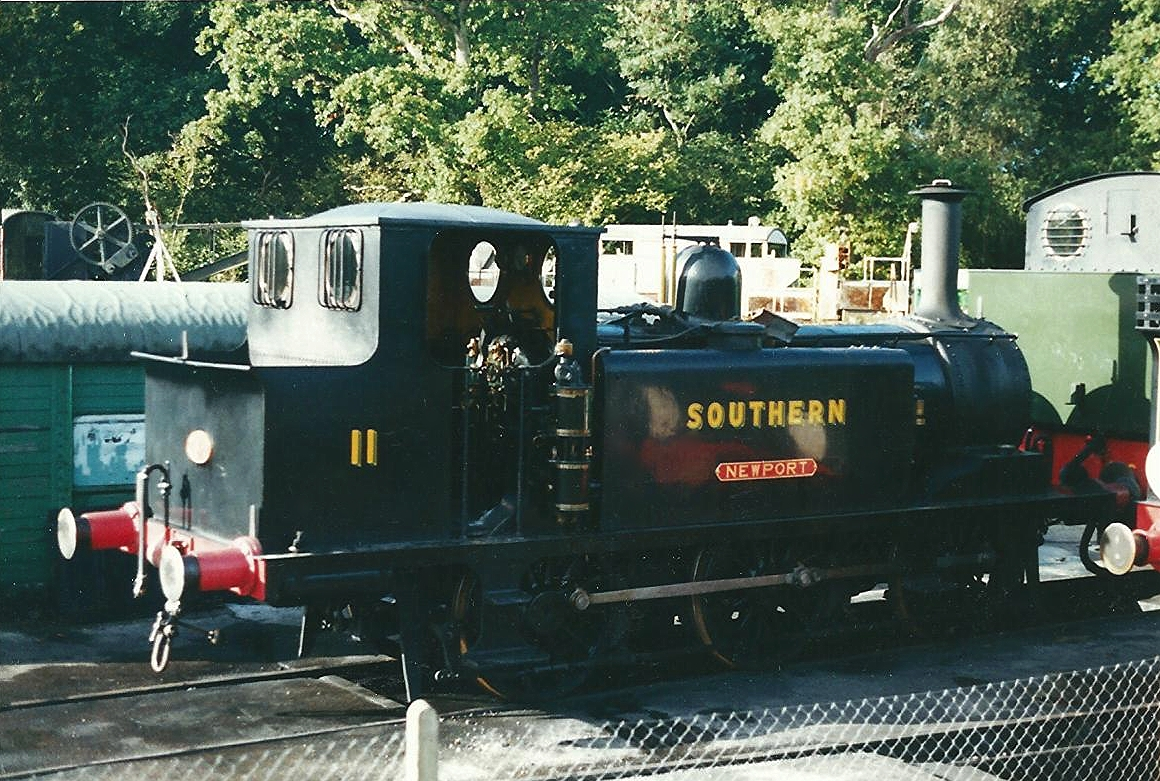
- W11 Newport at Havenstreet Station in SR Wartime Black.
Type and origin
- Power type: Steam
- Designer: William Stroudley
- Builder: LB&SCR Brighton works
- Build date: 1878
Specifications
- Configuration
  - Whyte: 0-6-0T
  - UIC: C
- Gauge: 4 ft 8 1/2 in (1,435 mm)
- Driver dia.: 48 in (1.22 m)
- Wheelbase: 12 ft (3.66 m)
- Length: 26 ft 0 1/2 in (7.938 m)
- Loco weight: 27.5 long tons (27.9 t) A1, 28 long tons (28 t) A1X
- Fuel type: Coal
- Firebox
  - Grate area: 33 ft^{2} (3.07 m^{2})
- Boiler pressure: 150 psi (1.0 MPa)
- Cylinders: 2
- Cylinder size: 12×20 in (305×508 mm) A1, 14.2×20 in (305×508 mm) A1X
Performance figures
- Tractive effort: 7,650 lbf (34.0 kN) A1, 10,695 lbf (47.57 kN) A1X
Career
- Operators: LB&SCR; IWCR; Southern Railway; British Railways
- Class: A1X
- Power class: Isle of Wight: A; BR: 0P

W11 Newport is a Stroudley A1X Terrier class 0-6-0T steam locomotive which is based at the Isle of Wight Steam Railway.

== History ==
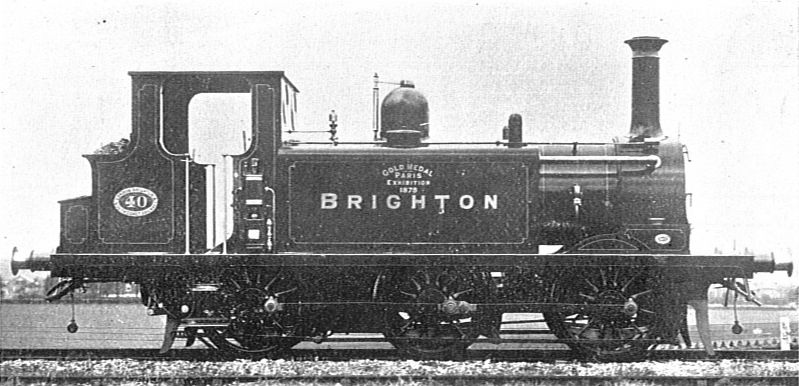
In 1907, as Brighton, carrying a commemorative badge for the Paris Exhibition

W11 emerged from Brighton Works in 1878 and was originally numbered 40 and named 'Brighton'.

It was chosen by William Stroudley to represent the LB&SCR at the Paris exhibition in 1878, where many trial runs were made in the Paris area to demonstrate its Westinghouse air brake system.

It was based at Battersea Shed until 1901, when she spent a spell assisting with sea defence works at Newhaven.

It was purchased by the IWCR in 1901, and was overhauled at Brighton Works. It was given the number 11 and repainted in IWCR livery. It arrived on the Island on 8 January 1902, and in August 1918 was rebuilt into an A1X class.

The engine passed into the ownership of the Southern Railway in 1923 and was renumbered as W11. It was given the name 'Newport' in 1930. Unlike many locomotives, Newport remained in Southern Railway olive green throughout the Second World War rather than being repainted plain black.

It was taken out of service in April 1946 and stored, until 22 February 1947 when she was shipped back to the mainland and sent to Eastleigh Works for overhaul. She was renumbered 2640.

British Railways took ownership in 1948 and she continued to be active along the South Coast working the Hayling Island branch, the Kent and East Sussex Railway and spells at Brighton, St Leonard's and Newhaven. In March 1951, it was renumbered 32640 and continued its duties along the south coast.

The locomotive was finally withdrawn from service on 27 September 1963, when she was purchased by Sir Billy Butlin. It was repainted in a yellow livery and was displayed at Pwllheli Holiday Camp until 1973.

Butlin was persuaded to place W11 on a ten-year loan to the Wight Locomotive Society, and it returned to the Island on 27 January 1973.

== Preservation ==
Originally it was planned to have W11 restored at Ryde by British Railways, but after problems arose it was moved to the base of the Isle of Wight Steam Railway at Havenstreet on 17 January 1975, where the locomotive was cosmetically restored as IWCR No 11.

It remained on static display until July 1976, when its purchase from Butlin's was completed.

The locomotive was finally returned to steam in 1989, progress having been hampered by lack of manpower, finance and workshop facilities.

Having proved to be a powerful, economical locomotive, more than capable of hauling heavily loaded trains on the steeply graded IW Steam Railway, it was withdrawn from service on 24 August 2002 for overhaul.

The Isle of Wight Steam Railway announced in November 2007 that they had placed an order with Israel Newton for a new boiler for W11, the cost of which is believed to be in the region of £70,000. The new boiler arrived in 2010 and after steady progress W11 returned to steam in 2014.

== Livery ==
=== LB&SCR ===
- Stroudley's Improved Engine Green. (Her tank sides were inscribed 'Gold Medal, Paris Exhibition, 1878'.)

=== IWCR ===
- Lined Black

=== Southern Railway ===
- Maunsell lined Olive Green.
- Malachite Green with Sunshine lettering.

=== British Railway ===
- BR Standard Mixed-Traffic Black livery with red and white lining.

=== Preservation ===
- IWCR Lined Black (IWCR No.11)
- BR Standard Mixed-Traffic Black livery with red and white lining. (BR No.32640)
- Southern Railway Wartime matt black (SR N0. W11)
- SR Maunsell olive green (SR No. W11) *Note (Newport name plate is not present and number is on side tank not bunker)
