= LB&SCR A1 class =

Class of British 0-6-0T steam locomotives

LB&SCR A1 and A1X Classes
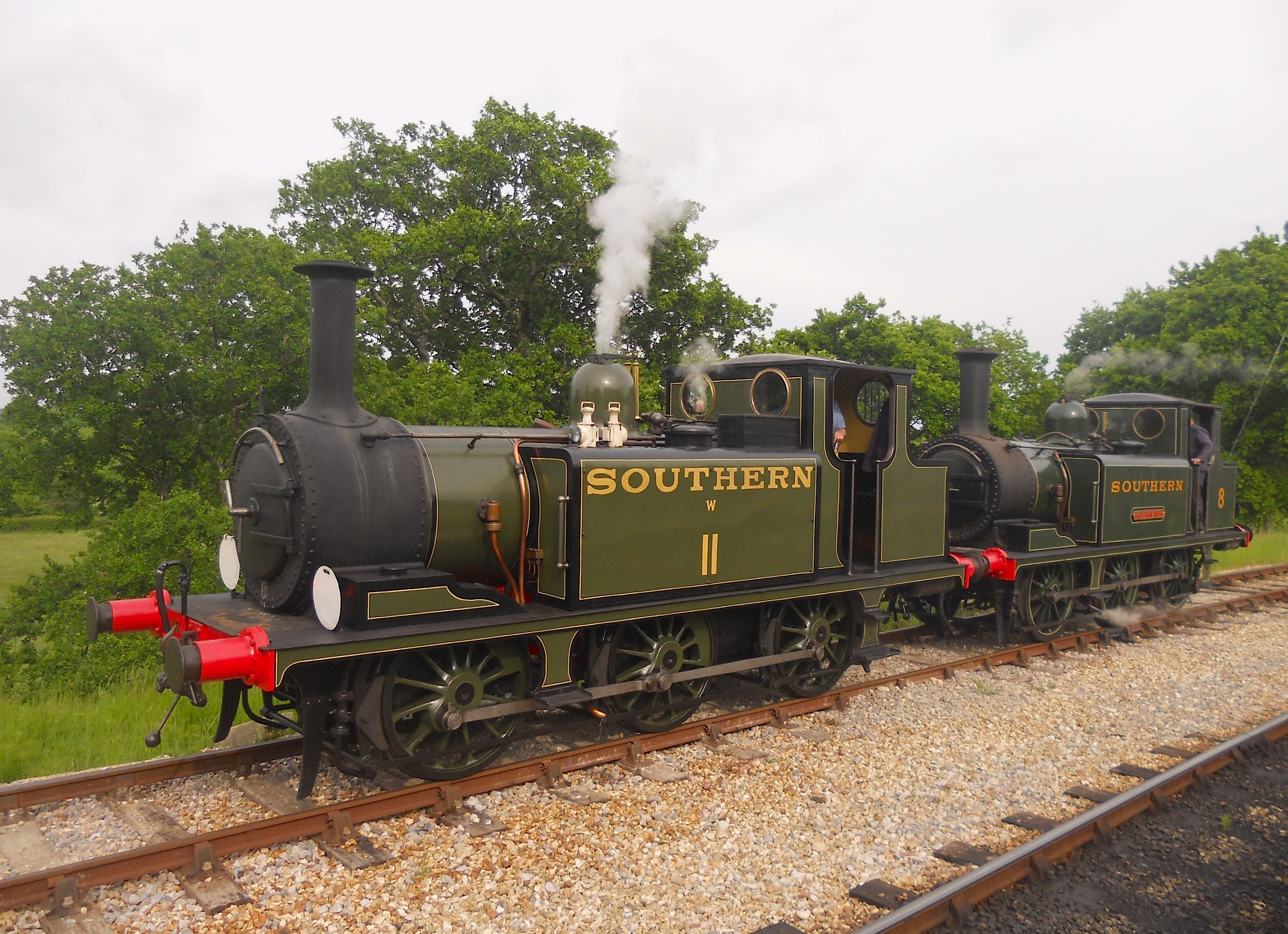
- Class A1 Nos. W11 Newport and W8 Freshwater run round the train at Wootton on the Isle of Wight Railway.
Type and origin
- Power type: Steam
- Designer: William Stroudley
- Builder: Brighton Works
- Build date: 1872-1880
- Total produced: 50, 17 rebuilt to A1X
Specifications
- Configuration
  - Whyte: 0-6-0T
  - UIC: C
- Gauge: 4 ft 8 1/2 in (1,435 mm) standard gauge
- Driver dia.: 4 ft 0 in (1,219 mm)
- Wheelbase: 12 ft (3,658 mm)
- Length: 26 ft 0 1/2 in (7.94 m)
- Loco weight: 27.5 long tons (27.9 t; 30.8 short tons) A1, 28 long tons (28 t; 31 short tons) A1X
- Fuel type: Coal
- Fuel capacity: 1 long ton (1.0 t; 1.1 short tons)
- Water cap.: 500 imp gal (2,300 L; 600 US gal)
- Firebox
  - Grate area: 10 to 11 1/4 sq ft (0.93 to 1.05 m^{2})
- Boiler pressure: 140 or 150 psi (0.97 or 1.03 MPa)
- Cylinders: 2
- Cylinder size: Various sizes from 9 in × 20 in (229 mm × 508 mm) up to 14 in × 20 in (356 mm × 508 mm)
Performance figures
- Tractive effort: A1: 7,650 lbf (34.0 kN); A1X: 7,650 lbf (34.0 kN) to 10,695 lbf (47.57 kN)
Career
- Operators: London, Brighton and South Coast Railway; Southern Railway; British Railways
- Class: A1
- Power class: Isle of Wight: A; BR: 0P
- Withdrawn: 1901–1963
- Disposition: Ten preserved, remainder scrapped

The London, Brighton and South Coast Railway (LB&SCR) A1 class is a class of British 0-6-0T steam locomotive. Designed by William Stroudley, 50 members of the class were built in 1872 and between 1874 and 1880, all at Brighton railway works. The class has received several nicknames, initially being known as "Rooters" by their south London crews. However, the engines were more famously known as "Terriers" on account of the distinctive 'bark' of the exhaust beat. Later in their careers, some engines were known as "Hayling Billy" on account of their work on the Hayling Island branch line. A pub of this name on the island was briefly home to the engine which is now No. W8 Freshwater.

After displacement from their original workings out of London Bridge and London Victoria by more powerful locomotives from the D1 class and the early stages of the LB&SCR overhead electrification scheme, some representatives of the class were sold to other operators, while the majority of the remainder were put to work on branch lines in Sussex and on non-revenue earning work such as shunting. They were known to reach speeds of up to 60 mph (97 km/h).

With these new uses being found, the class remained in use on the system, surviving to be taken into ownership by the Southern Railway from 1923 and by British Railways from 1948. Although the number of engines dwindled following the Second World War as the work they were used for was either dieselised or lost to rail through the closure of branch lines and yards, a number continued in operation through into the 1960s. One was fitted for Push-Pull working from Fareham to Lee on the Solent with a 2 car ex-LSWR push-pull set in Summer or just the driving trailer in Winter (previously an LCDR A class 0-4-4T number 626 fitted with the original 2 coach gated set service) but most famously on the Hayling Island branch line in Hampshire. The withdrawal of the final members of the class finally came in 1963, the line to Hayling having closed in November 1963.

Eight members of the class were purchased privately for preservation, with two other examples being donated by British Railways to the Canadian Railway Museum and the National Railway Museum, those being No. 54 Waddon and No. 82 Boxhill respectively. One of these engines, No. 55 Stepney, is best known as being the first standard gauge locomotive to arrive at the Bluebell Railway, which was itself the first preserved standard gauge steam-operated passenger railway in the world when it opened in August 1960, and also for appearing in Stepney the "Bluebell" Engine by the Reverend Wilbert Awdry.

== History ==
=== London, Brighton & South Coast Railway (1872-1923) ===
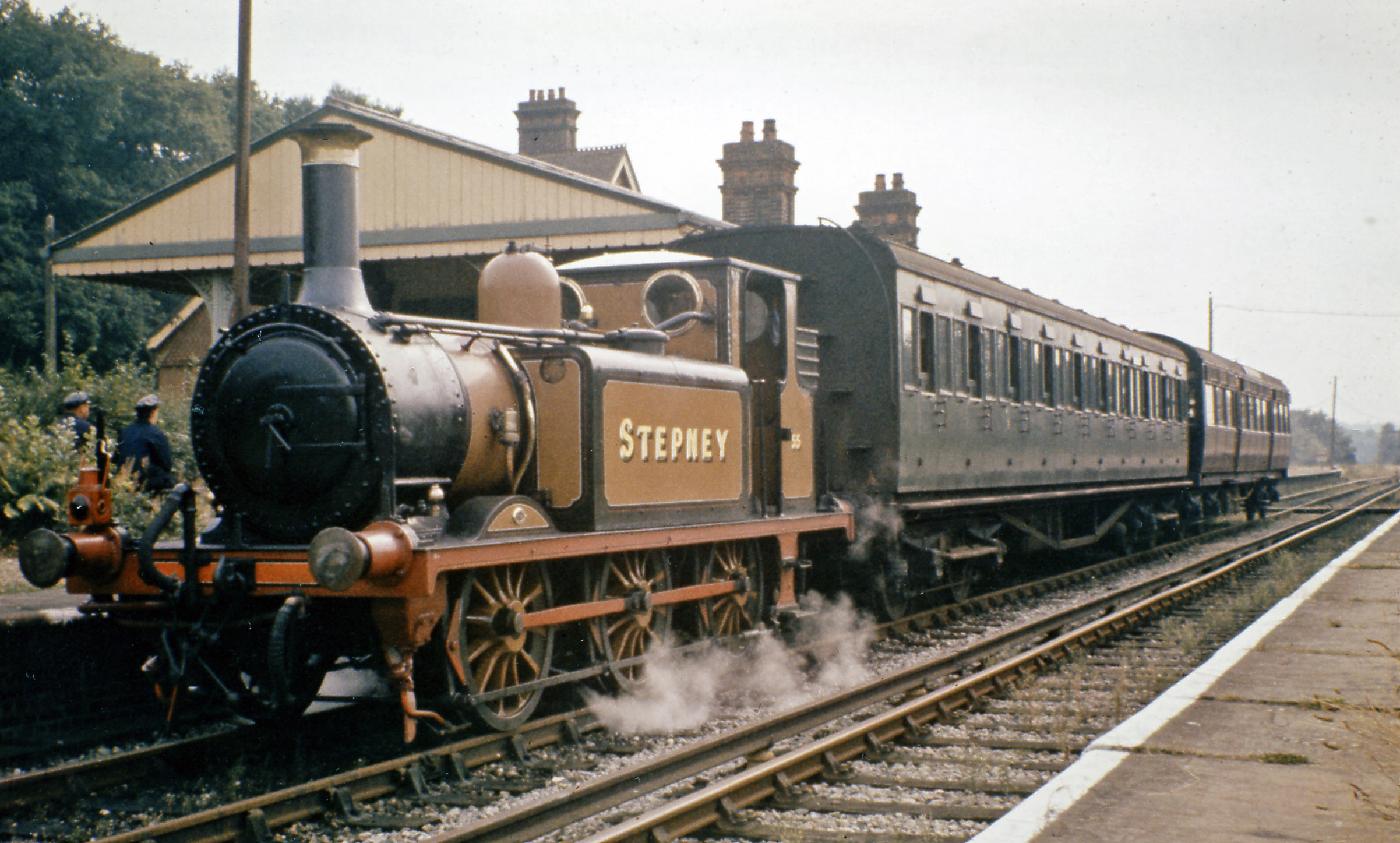
No.55 Stepney carrying the early LB&SCR 'Improved Engine Green' livery

Originally known as 'A' class, these diminutive tank locomotives were designed in 1870 to haul commuter trains on the heavily congested lines in South and South-East London. These included routes from London Bridge to both East and West Croydon, London Victoria to Sutton and the line from Victoria to London Bridge via Peckham Rye and Denmark Hill, as well as operating on the East London Railway under the Thames through the Thames Tunnel designed by Marc Isambard Brunel. Six locomotives were built for these services during 1872, and were successful thanks to their high acceleration between the closely spaced station stops and the use of lightweight trains. A further 44 were built between June 1874 and September 1880 to complement the original six.

Construction summary
Numbers	Quantity	Dates to traffic
70–75	6	September–December 1872
64–69	6	June–August 1874
52–63	12	October 1875–February 1876
46–51	6	December 1876–January 1877
41–45, 76	6	June 1877
35–40	6	March–June 1878
77–84	8	July–September 1880

All were built at Brighton.

The locomotives were finished in the livery known as "Stroudley's Improved Engine Green", which was actually an ochre colour, not green. The actual shade of the livery has been much disputed, with opinions ranging from a more yellow type of livery to a livery closer to brown, as worn by the model named Como in the Brighton Toy and Model Museum.

Shortly after construction, No. 40 Brighton was chosen by William Stroudley to represent the LB&SCR at the Paris Exhibition of 1878, and won a gold medal for workmanship. On a run from Dieppe to Paris, arranged to persuade the Chemins de Fer de l'Ouest that the company's boat trains that met the LB&SCR ferries from Newhaven could make better time to the capital, Brighton maintained a speed of nearly 50 mph (80 km/h), previously unheard of on that line.

During the last two decades of the 19th century, London was expanding outwards as suburbs became more built up and were absorbed into the built-up area of London itself. Towns such as Croydon, Sutton and Norwood, which had previously been commuter towns separate from London, grew to form one large area of housing. Much of this was because of the success of the 'Terriers' themselves, as they had speeded up suburban passenger services, encouraging people to move out of the centre of London. Trains became progressively heavier while the need for shorter journey times remained the same. As a result, the engines gradually became largely unsuited for their original purpose, and they were replaced by the larger D1 class tank engines. However the 'Terriers' were so reliable that they were put on other work, often finding use on branch line passenger and freight workings and as shunting engines.

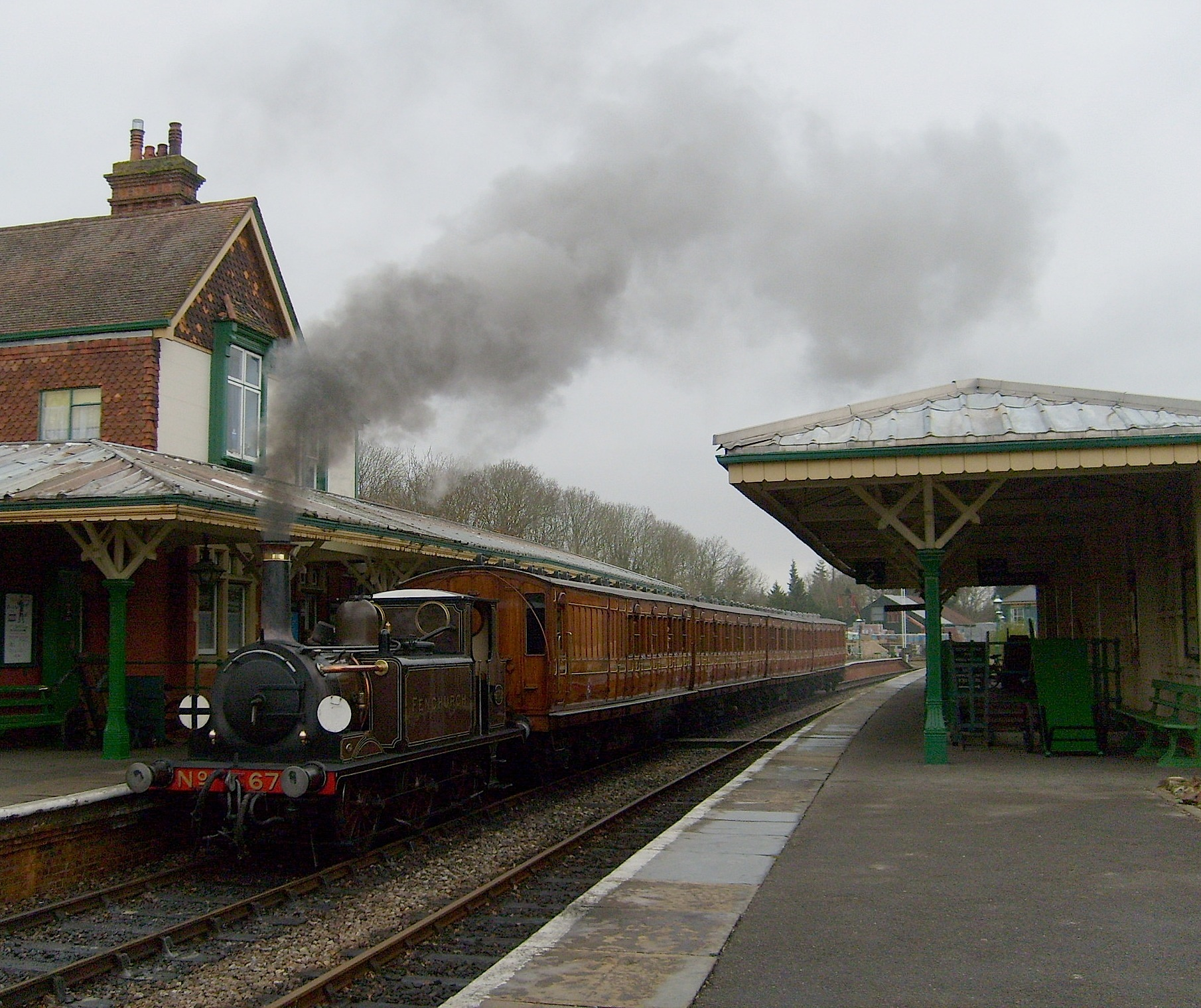
No.672 'Fenchurch' carrying the later LB&SCR umber livery. It is seen at Kingscote with a train of Metropolitan Railway carriages.

Twenty-three members of the class were withdrawn between 1898 and 1905, but the majority of these were sold in working order rather than scrapped. Purchasers of these locomotives included the Newhaven Harbour Company, the Isle of Wight Central Railway (IWCR) (four locomotives), Pauling & Co. (five locomotives), the Kent and East Sussex Railway (two locomotives), the London and South Western Railway (LSWR) (two locomotives - Nos. 734 & 735), and the South Eastern and Chatham Railway (SE&CR) (one locomotive - No. 751). Others were transferred from capital to departmental (non-revenue earning) stock as pilots at Brighton locomotive works and Lancing carriage works. It is likely that the remainder of the class would have been withdrawn over the subsequent few years if the railway had not adopted push-pull or 'motor-train' working on many lightly used branch line services. The 'A1' class (as the locomotives were designated after 1905) were found ideally suited for conversion to this form of working.

The original boilers were of 3 ft 6 in (1.07 m) diameter with barrel 7 ft 10 in (2.39 m) long, wrought-iron fireboxes 4 ft 1 in (1.24 m) long having a grate area of 10.3 sq ft (0.96 m^{2}) and worked at a pressure of 140 lbf/in^{2} (970 kPa). Steel fireboxes were tried on two locomotives in 1889 but these were unsuccessful. From 1888, new fireboxes were made of copper, with a slightly smaller grate area, 10 sq ft (0.93 m^{2}), but an increased pressure of 150 lbf/in^{2} (1,000 kPa). Not all were so fitted, as withdrawal began in 1898, although some of the locomotives sold were reboilered by their new owners. These included the SE&CR locomotive, given a new boiler in 1910, its firebox being longer at 5 ft 2 in (1.57 m) having a grate area of 10 1/2 sq ft (0.98 m^{2}), the pressure remaining at 140 lbf/in^{2} (970 kPa); and also the two LSWR locomotives, given new Drummond-design boilers in 1912, their barrels being of 3 ft 4 1/2 in (1.029 m) diameter and length 7 ft 9 1/2 in (2.375 m), fireboxes 4 ft 0 1/2 in (1.232 m) long having a grate area of 11 1/4 sq ft (1.05 m^{2}) and a pressure of 150 lbf/in^{2} (1,000 kPa).

The original cylinders were of 13 in (330 mm) bore by 20 in (510 mm) stroke. Beginning in 1892, new cylinders were normally of 14 in (360 mm) bore, and most of the locomotives were so modified by the end of 1900. Between 1906 and 1909, most of the survivors were given 12 in (300 mm) cylinders, including three which never had 14-inch cylinders. Two exceptions were nos. 82 and 642, which in 1905 and 1907 were given smaller cylinders – 9 in (230 mm) bore and 10 in (250 mm) bore respectively.

Between 1911 and 1913, twelve survivors were re-boilered under the instruction of Douglas Earle Marsh, Stroudley's successor as CME of the LB&SCR, with another four so treated after the Great War; these engines formed the A1X class with an increased weight of 28.2 long tons (28.7 t). These A1x boilers were longer than the originals, having a barrel length of 8 ft 1 1/4 in (2.470 m); they had a grate area of 10 sq ft (0.93 m^{2}) and a pressure of 150 lbf/in^{2} (1,000 kPa). Other changes made during the rebuilding were the extension of the smokebox (removing the smokebox 'wings', and moving the sandboxes from this same area (where they formed a forward extension of the leading driving wheel splasher) to below the running plate (although some locos rebuilt later retained the original sandboxes). The tube which had been used as part of the original condensing arrangement between the smokebox and side-tank was also removed. The engines were repainted during this time in 'Marsh Umber' livery. A1x boilers were also fitted to some of the locomotives that had already been sold, including two of the four bought by the IWCR.

Five locomotives were bought by the British Government in 1918 and sent to Scotland to work at the U.S. Navy's North Sea Mine Barrage minelaying project at Inverness and Dalmore, near Invergordon. The facilities were built by the Admiralty, using distillery sites, but administered by the U.S. Navy. The locos were Nos 37 Southdown, 79 Minories, 81 Beulah and 83 Earlswood at Dalmore, and 38 Millwall which was used at Glen Albyn, Inverness. Nos 38, 81 and 83 later went on to the Shropshire & Montgomeryshire Railway.

=== Southern Railway (1923-1948) ===
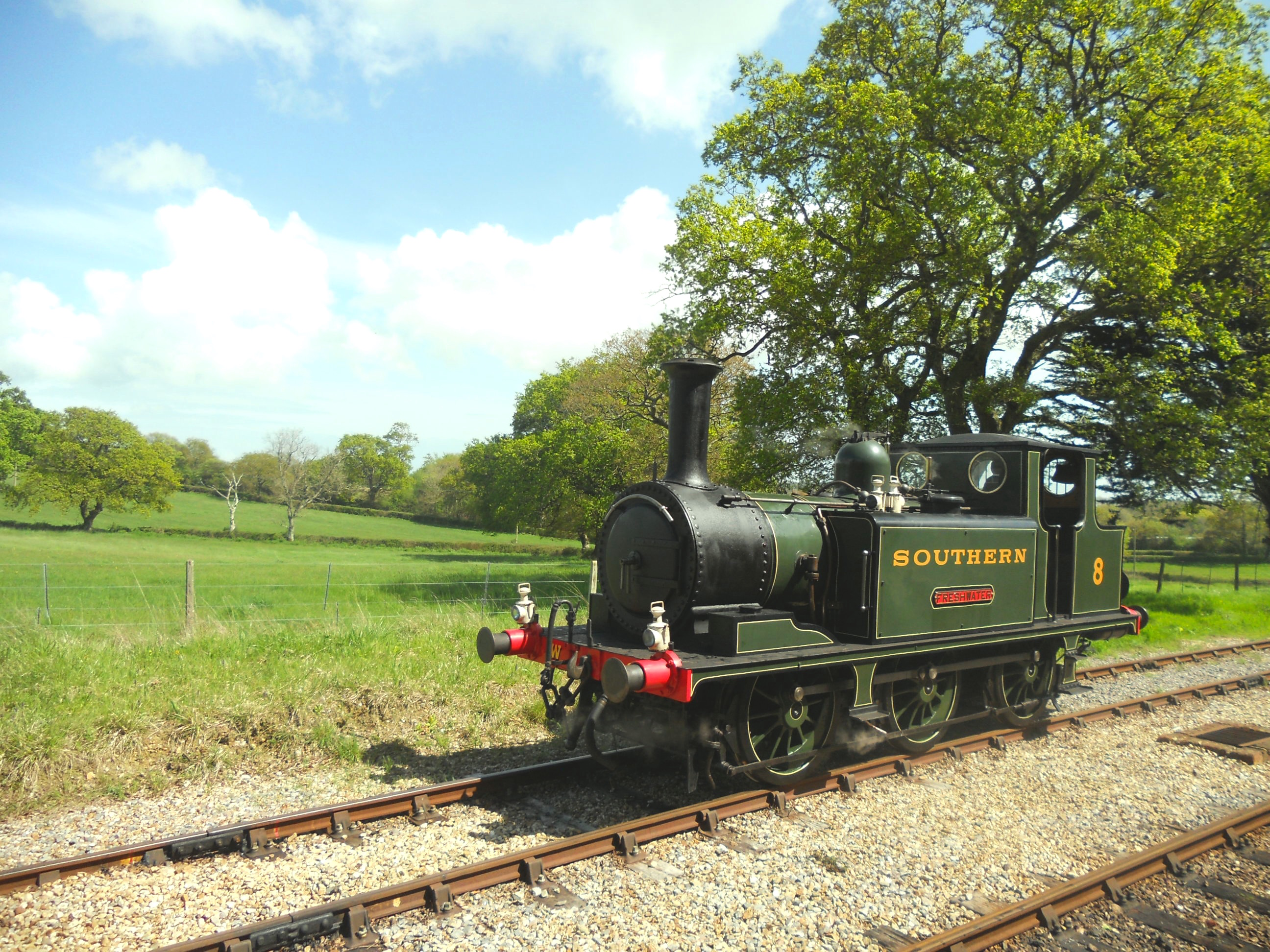
Southern Railway 0-6-0T Class A1X W8 Freshwater runs round the train at Wootton on the Isle of Wight Steam Railway.

Fifteen of the class remained in LB&SCR stock at the formation of the Southern Railway on 1 January 1923, but this figure was increased to 24 by the inclusion of those which had previously been sold to other constituent railways. Several examples were withdrawn over the next few years, and two were sold to the Weston, Clevedon and Portishead Railway in 1925 and 1937. As with the withdrawals under the LB&SCR, the engines were not withdrawn en masse, but instead over a long period of time. The first A1X to be withdrawn by the Southern Railway was No. 42 Tulse Hill in 1925, and among the engines withdrawn was the now-famous No. 55 Stepney, which only escaped being scrapped by virtue of the need for lighter engines on Hayling Island. The two locomotives, No. 43 Gipsy Hill and No.53 Ashtead, sold to the WCPR in 1925 and 1937 (see above) were renumbered No. 2 Portishead and No. 4 respectively. On the closure of that line in 1940, both locomotives entered service with the GWR, as No. 5 Portishead and No. 6 respectively, and survived into BR ownership. No. 5 Portishead was scrapped in 1954, No. 6 in 1948.

Many of the locomotives remained in traffic, both departmental and in regular stock. They lasted longer than most classes of pre-grouping tank engine under the Southern Railway, primarily due to the presence of several light railways which came under the Southern Railway's jurisdiction at the grouping, such as the lines from Tenterden and Hayling Island, as well as on the Isle of Wight. Most of these lines needed small engines such as the 'Terrier' class due to severe weight restrictions. Among the engines transferred into departmental use was the former No. 82 Boxhill, which was restored to original condition, painted in the yellow ochre livery of Stroudley and used as a shunter at Brighton Works, being numbered 380S and named after the works itself. This engine was replaced by 377S, formerly No. 35 Morden, in 1948. Although much photographed toward the end of steam, this locomotive was not preserved but was scrapped at Eastleigh in 1963.

With the Southern Railway concentrating on the design of larger locomotives for the increasingly heavy express passenger traffic on the South Eastern and South Western sections, with designs such as the King Arthur, Schools and Lord Nelson classes, and later the Bulleid Pacifics, as well as the expansion of the electrified third rail system from suburban roles (a system which had replaced the LB&SCR overhead electrification, which in turn had replaced the role of the D class tanks on suburban traffic from around 1910), the company was not concerned about replacing the veteran tank engines on branch line workings, especially as many of the smaller branch lines were not economically viable for electrification, or were isolated from the rest of the electrified network. As a result, the Southern Railway felt that perseverance with the older locomotives such as the A1X on rural routes was the most economically viable option.

=== British Railways (1948-1963) ===
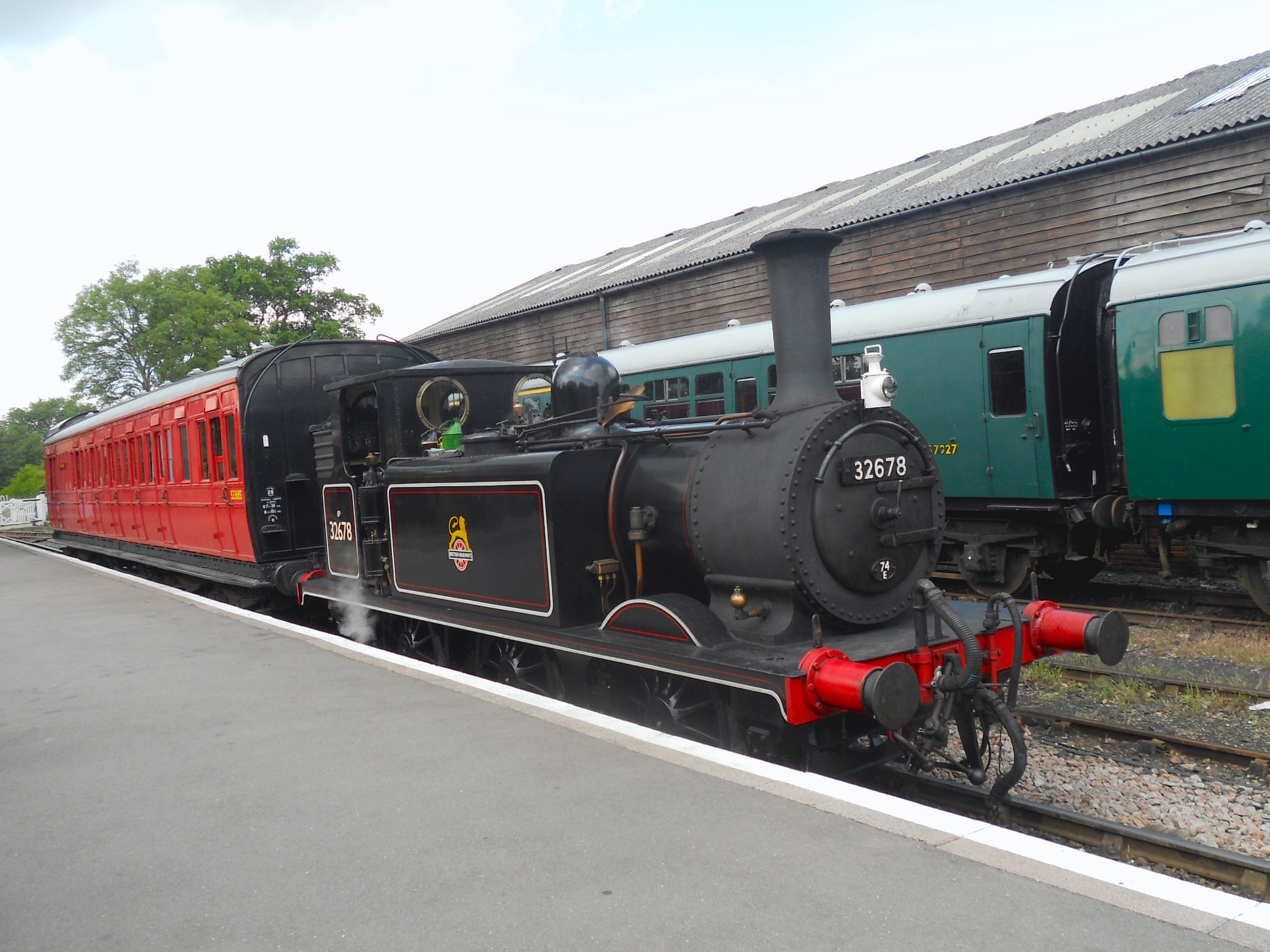
British Railways 0-6-0T Class A1X No. 32678 and a Birdcage Brake Coach at Tenterden Town recreating past scenes from the early 1950s on rural branch lines

At nationalisation in 1948, one "A1" and 16 "A1X" locomotives entered British Railways stock. All but two of these locomotives were based on the former Southern Railway, which became the Southern Region under British Railways, with the other two based on the Western Region, having been inherited by the Great Western Railway from the Weston, Clevedon and Portishead Railway. BR gave the locomotives the power classification 0P, indicating that the locomotives were primarily passenger locomotives, but were among the least powerful on the system.

The locomotives remained employed much as they had been under Southern Railway ownership, with roles centred on working over the lightly laid and weight restricted branches. However, the class were becoming increasingly expensive to maintain through physical wear and increased age of components. The future of the class was thrown into doubt with the publication of the Modernisation Plan, which made provision to close many of the routes still operated by the class. The main two routes still retaining 'Terrier' operations were the Kent & East Sussex Railway and the Hayling Island branch. The former closed due to being unprofitable in 1961.

The line to Hayling Island remained profitable, however, primarily due to the heavy traffic in summer. The condition of the bridge over Langstone Harbour was, however, deteriorating, and the Southern Region designated the bridge as being beyond economic repair. The final scheduled services over the line were run on 3 November 1963, and a special 'topped and tailed' by 32636 and 32670 the following day. The final scheduled train was notable for being one of the last steam hauled mixed trains. With the closure of this line, BR decided to withdraw the last remaining members of the class from traffic. At the time of her withdrawal following the closure of the line, No. 32636 (formerly No. 72 Fenchurch) was the oldest working steam engine in British Railways ownership.

== Numbering ==
The locomotives were originally numbered between 35 and 84, and most were given names of London boroughs or other areas of local importance which were served by the LB&SCR suburban trains they were built to operate (such as Whitechapel, Surrey and Thames), and indeed also after areas around Brighton itself, such as Kemp Town. However, there were exceptions, such as No.82 which was, in fact, named after Box Hill, a peak of the North Downs in Surrey, just outside Dorking.

From 1900, the two-digit numbers were prefixed with a 6 and their names were replaced with the inscription LBSC on their side tanks (for example, No. 55 Stepney became No. 655). This was fairly standard LB&SCR practice; as engines got old, they were given higher numbers so that newer engines could have lower numbers.

Further renumbering took place under Southern Railway ownership. Initially, most locomotives retained their pre-Grouping numbers with a letter prefix denoting the main works that was responsible for maintaining the class. Ex-LBSC locomotives, being maintained at Brighton, received B prefixes, thus engine No.662 became B662). The exceptions to this rule were the engines based on the Isle of Wight, which were given a "W" prefix. In 1930 this system was replaced by a new numbering scheme, whereby former LB&SCR engines had their numbers increased by 2000. Under this scheme, No. B662 became No.2662.

A final renumbering in British Railways ownership saw the remaining members of the class renumbered by the addition of 30000 to their Southern Railway numbers (2678 becoming 32678, for instance), in line with the national renumbering scheme drawn up by British Railways in 1948.

The famous Brighton Works shunting engine 377S (i.e. no. 377 in Service stock), by this stage the only member of the class not in revenue earning service, became DS377 (the "DS" standing for Departmental, Southern region).

== Preservation ==
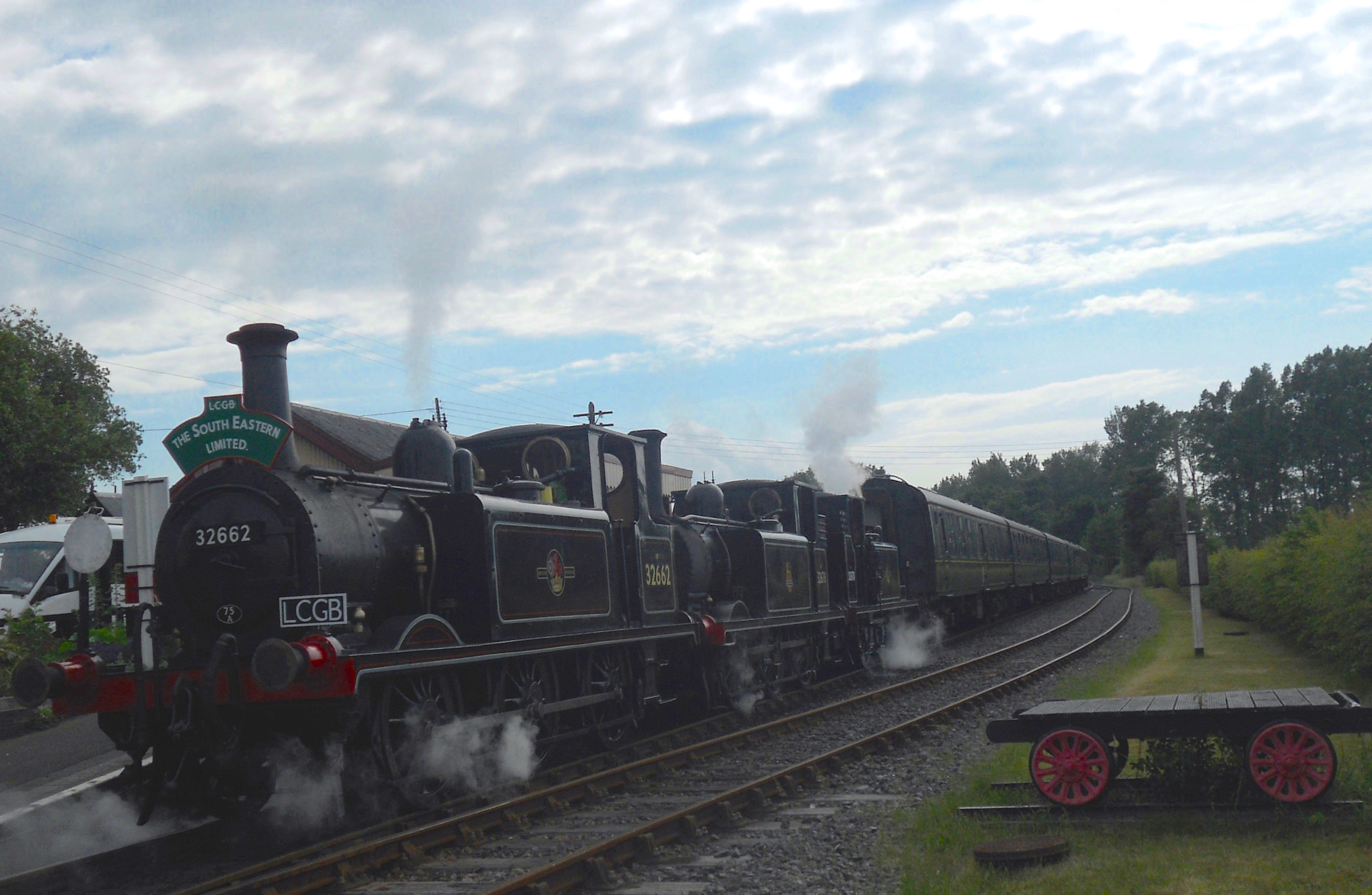
British Railways Class A1X Terrier No. 32662, No. 32678 and No. 32670 triple head a passenger train at Bodiam on the Kent and East Sussex Railway.

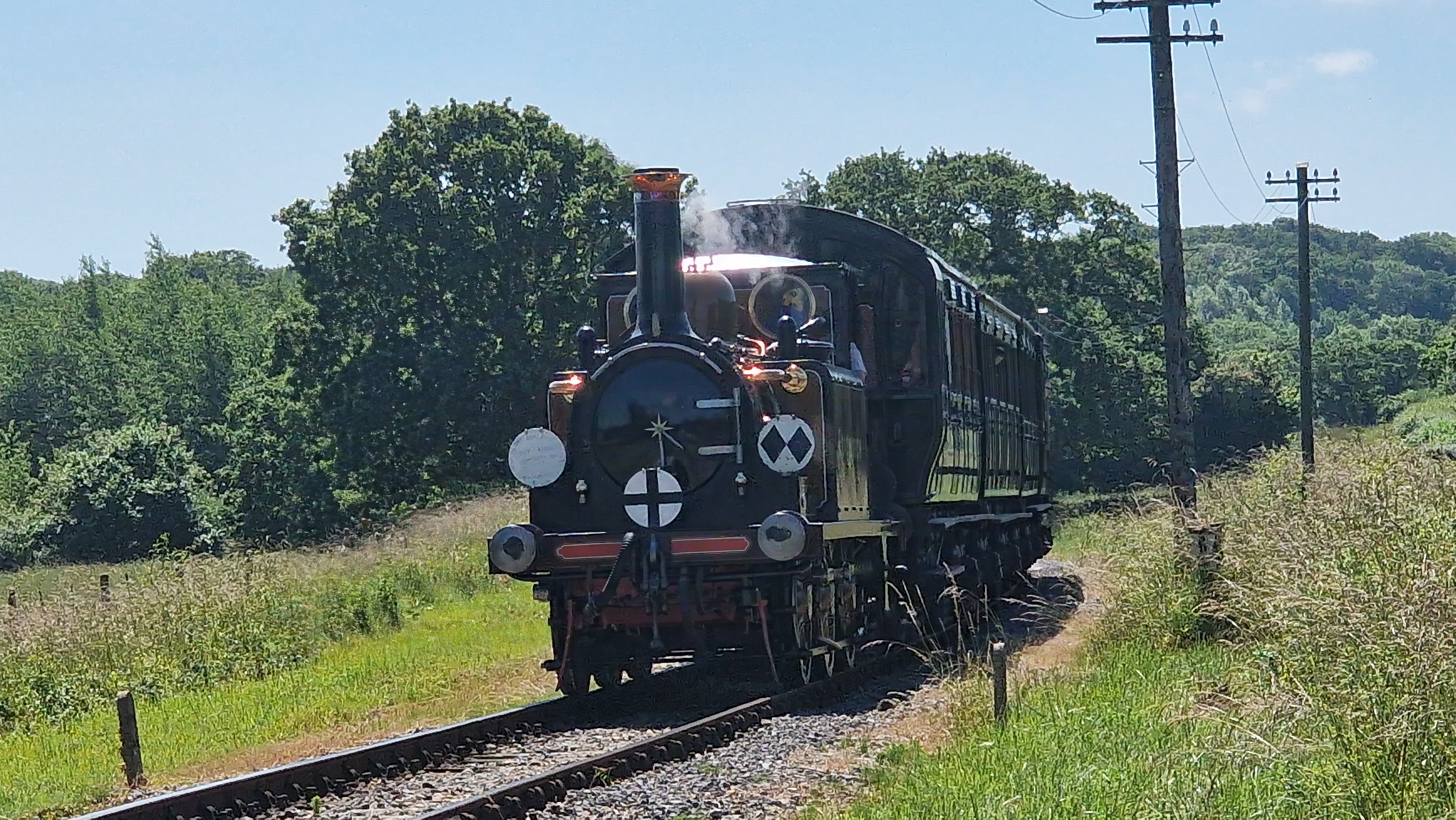
No. 72 Fenchurch approaching Wootton, Isle of Wight on 24 June 2023

Ten members of the class have been preserved, chiefly in the South of England. The engines are listed in order of their LB&SCR identity; the identity in bold is their current running identity as of September 2022.

Note: Numbers and Names in bold indicate what the engine presently wears.

Number	Number (BR)	Name	Built	Rebuilt	Withdrawn	Owner	Livery	Home Base	Current status	Image	Notes
40 **W11**	32640	Brighton **Newport**	Mar 1878	Aug 1918	Sept 1963	Isle of Wight Railway Co. Ltd.	Southern Railway Olive Green	Isle of Wight Steam Railway	Operational, Boiler Ticket Expires: 2024.		Air Braked
46 **W8**	32646	Newington **Freshwater**	Jan 1877	Mar 1932	Nov 1963	Isle of Wight Railway Co. Ltd.	Southern Railway Olive Green	Isle of Wight Steam Railway	Operational, Boiler ticket Expires: 2027.		Air Braked
50	**32650**	Whitechapel **Sutton**	Dec 1876	May 1920	Nov 1963	Sutton London Borough Council		Spa Valley Railway	Under Overhaul		
54	DS680 (Departmental)	**Waddon**	Feb 1876		May 1962	Canada Railway Historical Association	LB&SCR Stroudley Improved Engine Green	Canadian Railway Museum	Static Display		
55	32655	**Stepney**	Dec 1875	Oct 1912	May 1960	Bluebell Railway Preservation Society	LB&SCR Stroudley Improved Engine Green	Bluebell Railway	Static Display, Boiler Ticket Expired: 2014		Features in The Railway Series as Stepney the "Bluebell" Engine
62 **662**	32662	**Martello**	Oct 1875	Dec 1912	Nov 1963	Bressingham Steam Museum Trust	SR Lined Green	Bressingham Steam and Gardens	Operational, Boiler Ticket Expires: 2026.		
**70**	32670	**Poplar**	Dec 1872	Apr 1943	Jan 1964	The Terrier Trust	LB&SCR Stroudley Improved Engine Green	Kent and East Sussex Railway	Operational, Boiler Ticket Expires: 2032.		Last A1 to be rebuilt into A1X condition
72 **672**	32636	**Fenchurch**	Sep 1872	Apr 1913	Jan 1964	Bluebell Railway Preservation Society	LB&SCR Stroudley Improved Engine Green	Bluebell Railway	Operational as of January 2023		First of the class to enter service; cosmetically altered to appear as an A1
78 **2678**	32678	**Knowle**	Jul 1880	Nov 1911	Oct 1963	The Terrier Trust	Southern Black	Kent and East Sussex Railway	Operational, Boiler Ticket Expires: 2030.		Dual Braked (Vac & Air fitted)
**82**		**Boxhill**	Aug 1880		Aug 1946	UK National Collection	LB&SCR Stroudley Improved Engine Green	National Railway Museum	Static Display		

=== Preservation history ===
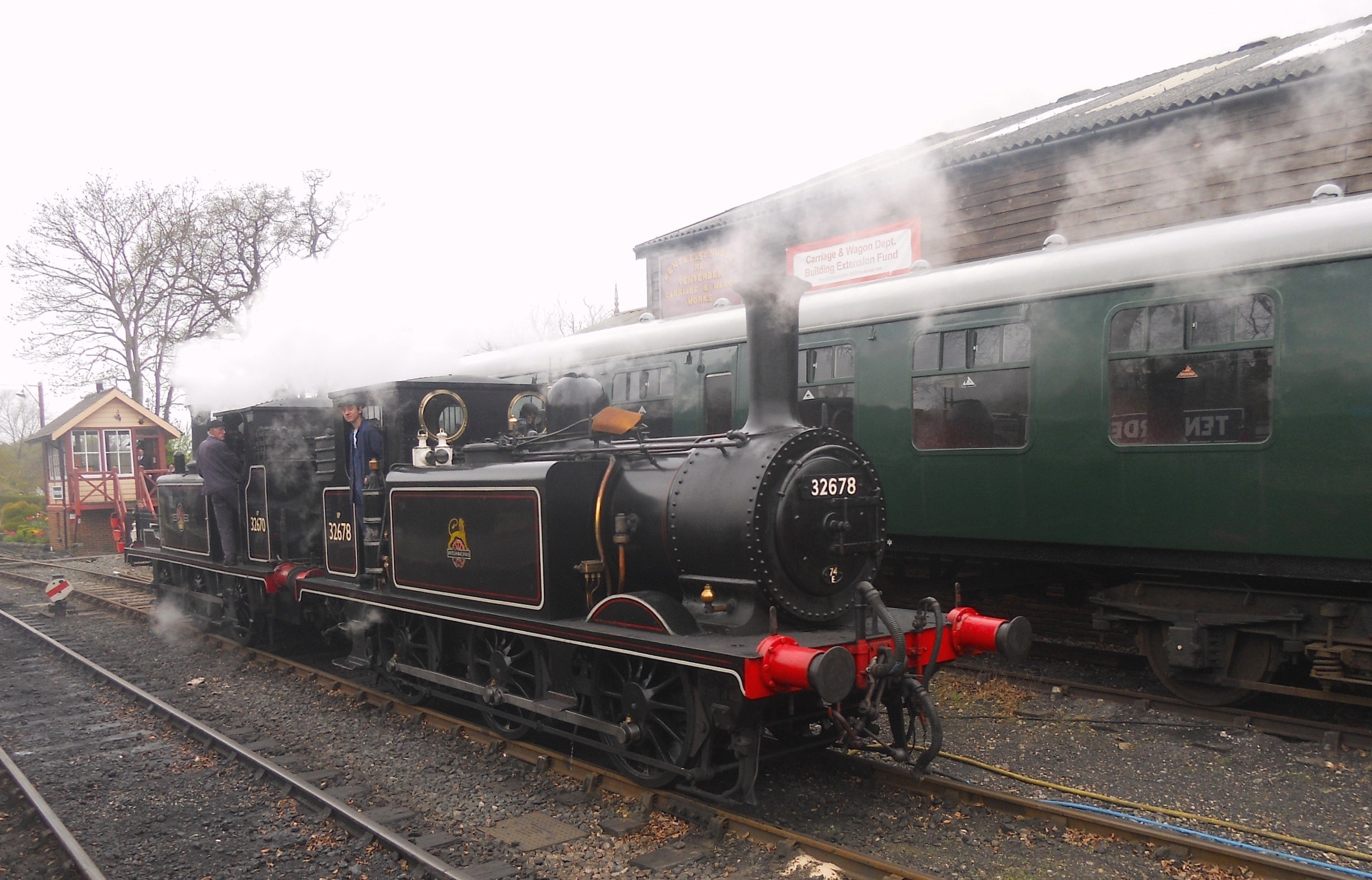
Both British Railways Class A1X No. 32678 and No. 32670 at Tenterden Town on the Kent and East Sussex Railway

No. 55 Stepney (as No. 32655) was the first engine to arrive at the first standard gauge preserved line in the UK, the Bluebell Railway on 17 May 1960, effectively making it the doyen of the current heritage railway movement. Following purchase by the fledgling society the locomotive was run under its own steam from Brighton shed to Horsted Keynes hauling the two carriages the society also now owned. The locomotive then went on to haul the reopening train in August of that year.

No. 72 Fenchurch was purchased by the Bluebell Railway in 1964. After much initial use, the locomotive was retired for overhaul in 1970, and returned to traffic in 1972 for its centenary. However it was withdrawn in 1975, and with a new firebox re-entered service in 1980, running until 1988. At its next overhaul, the need to replace one pair of the original wrought iron wheels (due to the detection of cracks in a wheel hub) meant the locomotive was not returned to traffic until 2001. Although carrying an A1X boiler, the smokebox was rebuilt during that overhaul such that it now looks very similar to its original A1 form.

An equally famous member of the class to No. 55, arguably, is No. 82 Boxhill. The engine was restored by the Southern Railway to original condition (it had remained as an A1, not having been rebuilt as an A1X) and used at exhibitions, before being moved into the original British Transport Museum in Clapham. It was subsequently moved to the museum at York where it still resides.

Also preserved in a national museum, No. 54 Waddon was donated by British Rail to the Canadian railway museum in 1963 and shipped on 23 August that year. After a number of years three British ex-pats living in Ottawa formed a small group to work on the locomotive – which had been in storage, but never outdoors – and restore it to pristine condition. Waddon was not rebuilt as an A1X, having been fitted with an SECR boiler after being sold to that railway, but was later fitted with, and now carries, an A1X boiler, while retaining the shorter A1-type smokebox.

Three members of the class were sold by British Rail to Butlins for display at their holiday camps. No. 40 Brighton (now Newport) was sent to Butlins Pwllheli in 1964 and initially loaned to the Isle of Wight steam railway in 1972. It was sold to them four years later for a price of £35,000. A lengthy restoration was completed in 1989, and Newport continued to run until 2002 when withdrawn for overhaul. The locomotive's boiler was found to be life-expired, and it was found cheaper to order a new boiler made (for £70,000) in 2007. In October 2010, the new boiler was delivered.

No. 62 Martello went to Butlins Heads-of-Ayr camp in 1963, and was displayed alongside 46233 Duchess of Sutherland before being loaned, and then sold, to the museum at Bressingham. The locomotive remained there for several years in a shed before removal and full restoration, which commenced in the late 1990s. In its Marsh Umber livery numbered 662 with LBSC on its tanks, it has visited several heritage railways in the UK since being returned to traffic. In May 2011 it was repainted at Loughborough on the Great Central Railway in BR black as 32662 with the late BR logo, in readiness to join 32670 and 32678 on the K&ESR for the Last Train Commemoration that took place on 11 June 2011. No. B662 also carries the bunker from classmate No. W13 Carisbrooke, exchanging bunkers in 1959 when the latter was scrapped.

No. 78 Knowle went to Butlins Minehead camp and was displayed alongside 46229 Duchess of Hamilton before being purchased by the K&ESR in 1975. This locomotive is now owned by The Terrier Trust.

Also owned by The Terrier Trust is No. 70 Poplar (usually running as K&ESR No. 3 Bodiam), which was initially purchased from BR by the Wheels brothers of Brighton in 1964, and was used in the early years of operation on the original Kent and East Sussex Light Railway as well as on the same restored heritage railway. Following withdrawal in 1985, the engine remained out of use for a decade before the K&ESR and The Terrier Trust bought the locomotive and agreed a restoration plan. It returned to traffic in May 2006 at the All Terriers Great and Small Gala in its original Rother Valley Railway livery of Oxford Blue. In April 2011 it was repainted BR black as 32670, with the late BR logo, to feature at the Last Train Commemoration that took place on 11 June 2011. Both of the Terriers continue to be regular performers on the K&ESR; the short trains and light loading gauge make them ideally suited to operating on the line.

No. 50 Whitechapel was purchased by the Municipal Borough of Sutton and Cheam in 1963 (after the originally intended purchase, No. 61 Sutton, had been cut up). The intention was to display the engine outside the new Civic Centre, and the engine was offered a home on the K&ESR until the work was completed. The engine was restored and used to haul the opening train on the preserved K&ESR in 1974. After slipping down the overhaul queue at Rolvenden, the engine was moved to the Spa Valley Railway by the owners (the engine still being owned by Sutton Borough Council) and restoration work commenced.

No. 46 Newington has perhaps the most unusual history. Following withdrawal in 1963, the locomotive was sold to the Sadler Rail Coach company based at Droxford, Hampshire on the disused Meon Valley Railway. It was used on occasion between the Droxford and Wickham stations on that line. Subsequently, it was sold to the Portsmouth-based Brickwoods brewery in the spring of 1966. The brewery wanted it for use outside a new public house to be opened on Hayling Island named The Hayling Billy. The engine was displayed there for a number of years, becoming locally famous, before being donated to the Isle of Wight Steam Railway in 1979.

=== Main line operation ===
None of the preserved members of the class has been restored to full main line running condition. Some consideration was given to doing so during the restoration of No. 62 Martello in the early years of the 21st century, in order to facilitate the appearance of the engine at open days and exhibitions in an operational condition; however the costs involved led to the idea being abandoned.

Prior to the end of steam and the banning of steam engines from the national network in 1968, No. 55 Stepney worked two special trains over the metals of the Southern Region. The first trip ran on 21 October 1962 and saw No. 55 double-head with LSWR Adams radial tank No. 488 on the Haywards Heath to Horsted Keynes and return section of a rail tour from London Victoria to the Bluebell Railway. The second train ran from Brighton to Horsted Keynes on 27 October 1963 for members of the Bluebell Railway Preservation Society, which saw the locomotive double-head with another former LB&SCR locomotive, E4 No. 473 Birch Grove, and was run to mark the closure of the line from Haywards Heath to Horsted Keynes.

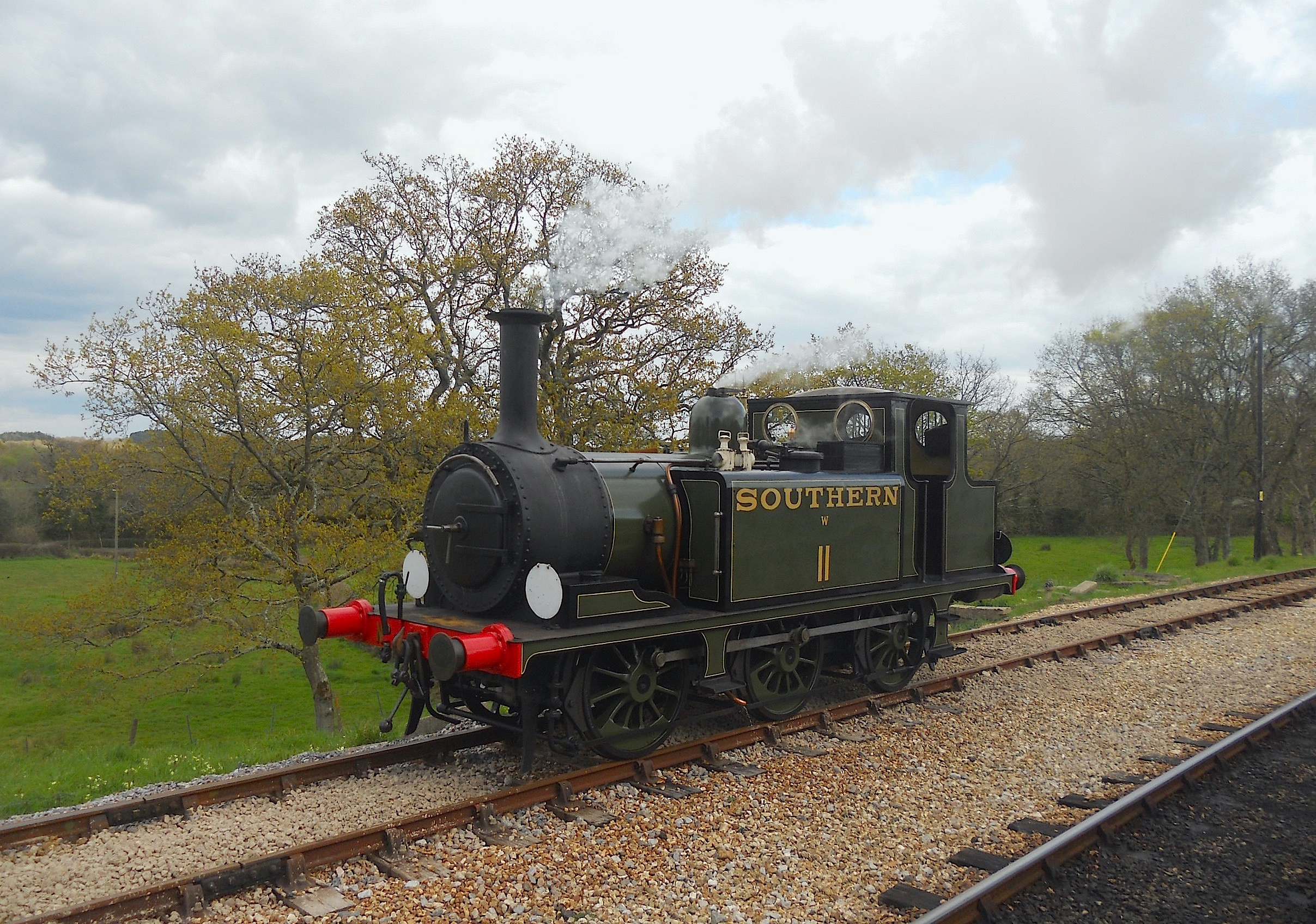
Southern Railway No. W11 runs round the train at Wootton on the Isle of Wight Steam Railway. This is one of the locomotives which could in future work through to Ryde.

No. 55 returned to Brighton station in 1991 to mark the 150th anniversary of the opening of the London and Brighton Railway to Brighton. The locomotive was left 'cold' (i.e. not in steam) and was coupled to another ex-LB&SCR locomotive, Gladstone, and stabled during the day on the easternmost platform (number 9). The engines were the centre-piece of an exhibition which also included, among others, former Southern Railway 'King Arthur' No. 777 Sir Lamiel, Britannia Class No. 70000 Britannia and BR Standard 4MT No. 80072, a class of locomotive built at Brighton.

In August 1975, No. 72 Fenchurch represented the LB&SCR and the Bluebell Railway at the Rail 150 Steam Cavalcade held at Shildon in County Durham, an event held to mark the 150th anniversary of the opening of the Stockton & Darlington Railway. This featured the engine running over a section of the BR network, although the line was subject to special restrictions at the time. Additionally the engine ran a number of shuttles into the wagon works complex from the railway station, top-and-tailing the workings with NER Class P3 No. 65894 from the North Yorkshire Moors Railway.

If future plans to extend the Isle of Wight Steam Railway from Smallbrook Junction to Ryde St. John's are successful, members of that railway's fleet, including their two A1X engines, may be seen running over Network Rail track between the two locations.

== Terriers in popular culture ==
An A1X class locomotive, Stepney appears in Stepney the "Bluebell" Engine, one of the books in The Railway Series of children's books written by the Rev. W. Awdry. Boxhill was referred to in a later book in the series: Thomas and the Great Railway Show. Stepney also appears in the television adaptation Thomas & Friends.

The 1975 Ken Russell film Lisztomania includes a sequence shot on the Bluebell Railway which features No. 72 Fenchurch smashing a grand piano left on the line while running at speed (actually filmed with the engine running at 25 mph (40 km/h), the speed limit of the line, with the film sped up for impact).

A 1961 film version of Anna Karenina, parts of which were filmed on 'The Bluebell Railway', included No. 55 Stepney disguised as a Russian locomotive.

== The A1 class overseas ==
Two of the three locomotives sold to Pauling & Co. were exported to South America and one worked on the La Plata tramway in the 1920s.

Eight locomotives were built by local Australian builders for the New South Wales Government Railways, Australia – to the LB&SCR's general arrangement and drawings – and entered traffic as the N67 class at about the same time as the A1 class in England. They were essentially identical engines, except for a simpler cab, larger bunker, larger sandboxes and other various detail differences. They became redundant from about 1890 after the introduction of larger and more powerful tank locomotives and many were fitted with small cranes in place of the bunker. In this form they were put to work as shunters and as "coal grabs" - small mobile coal loaders for refuelling larger locomotives at depots. Some saw service with other groups into the 1930s. They were less successful than their English cousins due to rather different operating conditions and all were scrapped before the start of the preservation era.
