= Dillington (disambiguation) =

Dillington may refer to:

== Places in England ==
- Dillington, Cambridgeshire, a hamlet neat Great Staughton
- Dillington, Somerset, a hamlet near Ilminster
  - Dillington House, a hotel and college

== People ==
- Dillington baronets
- Robert Dillington (disambiguation)
