= Robert Dillington =

Robert Dillington may refer to:

- Sir Robert Dillington, 1st Baronet (c. 1575–1664)
- Sir Robert Dillington, 2nd Baronet (c. 1634–1687), MP
- Sir Robert Dillington, 3rd Baronet (c. 1664–1689), MP for Newport (Isle of Wight) (UK Parliament constituency)
- Robert Dillington (died 1604), MP for Yarmouth (Isle of Wight) (UK Parliament constituency) and Newtown, Isle of Wight
