= Great Budbridge Manor =

Grade II listed manor house in England

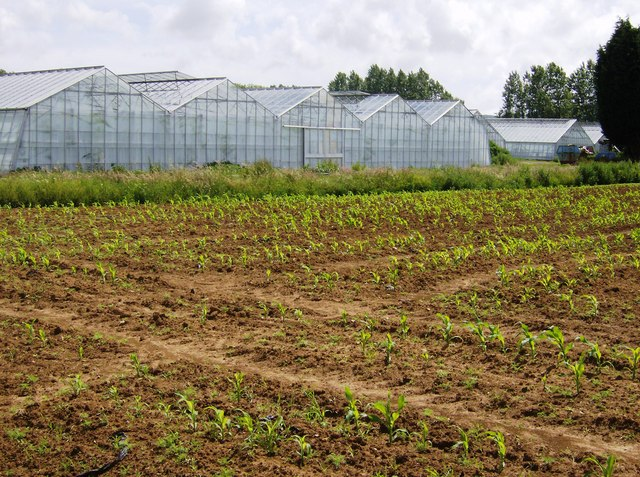
- Greenhouses at Great Budbridge Manor

- Location within Isle of Wight

General information
- Architectural style: Jacobean architecture
- Location: Near Merstone, Isle of Wight, England
- Coordinates: 50°38′55″N 1°15′8.6″W
- Construction started: 12th Century

Technical details
- Structural system: Brick

The Great Budbridge Manor (original name in Domesday Book: Messetone or Marshton; also: Botebrigge, 13th century; Butbrygg or Northbudbrygge, 15th century) is a manor house just south of Merstone, near Arreton, Isle of Wight, England. Fish ponds on the grounds appear medieval.

The manor's history has been traced to John de Lisle, Henry de Botebrigge and Walter Urry during the reign of Henry III (1207–72). Records testify its ownership by William Urry in 1280. Consequent to the conviction of Robert Urry, William's son, in 1312 for murdering the Constable of Carisbrooke Castle, part of his land was acquired. However, the manor remained in the name of the family till 1450. More than 200 years later, in 1633 the manor was bought by Sir Robert Dillington, 1st Baronet.

== Geography ==
The Great Budbridge Manor, a Grade II Listed British heritage building, is located in East Lane south of Merstone and Arreton in the Isle of Wight in England. Located in a farming area, it is of 12th-century vintage. Owners of the manor house have converted part of their land for commercial use, with many acres devoted to greenhouse farming of tomatoes grown annually and which are sold in most parts of Great Britain.

== History ==
The first mention of it under its present name occurs in the Testa de Nevill towards the end of the 13th century, when it was held in two moieties, half a fee under John de Lisle of Wootton by Henry de Botebrigge, and a fifth of a fee, formerly held by Walter Urry under Matilda de Estur of Gatcombe, by the Abbot of Quarr Abbey. In 1328, Henry de Botebrigge, and in 1331 Robert de Botebrigge, confirmed a grant made by their ancestors in frankalmoign to the Abbot and convent of Quarr of part of the meadow called Ryedemede in the east part of the road from Budbridge to 'la Rydeforde.' By the middle of the 14th century, Henry de Botebrigge had been succeeded by Henry Romyn. In 1358, William de Wintershill seems to have been in possession of Budbridge, here called a manor, as in that year he demised it to John de Weggham.

In 1364–5, Robert Urry and Parnel, his wife, sold a messuage and half a carucate of land in Arreton to John Burgham and his wife Agnes, and William Burgham was holding half a fee there in 1428 and 1431. In 1481, the manor of North Budbridge was settled on Elizabeth Bramshott for life, with remainder in tail to William Bramshott, to Richard Hawles son of Elizabeth and to Agnes Hawles, daughter of Elizabeth. In 1510, George Bramshott sold the 'manor of North Budbridge' to Thomas Cooke. Sir John Oglander speaks of a Richard Cooke, captain of Sandham Castle, who lived at Budbridge, and 'came always to Arreton Church in his wrought velvet gown and 12 of his soldiers with halibardes wayghted upon him'. His estate fell to two daughters: Captain Bourly married one, and Hambrydge the other.

John Burley of Northwood conveyed his moiety in 1596 to Richard Harvey and Edward Harbert of Arreton. John Hambridge may have disposed of his share to the Budden family, as a Thomas Budden was presented at the East Medine Hundred Court 9 April 1604 for the decay of 'packway and bridge leading from Mr. Worsley's Hall to Great Butbridge.' Twenty years later, Daniel Budden sold the manor to Sir Robert Dillington, 1st Baronet. It then passed with Knighton in Newchurch to Maurice George Bissett, in whose family it remained till sold in 1823 to Sir Samuel Spicer. On his death, intestate, the estate passed to his brother John as heir at law, who bequeathed it to his widow Rebecca. Rebecca Spicer died in 1847, leaving a life interest in the property to her nephew Robert Paris, with remainder to his son Robert, who in 1871 sold the reversion to Frederick Blake. On the death of Robert Paris the elder in 1883, Blake took possession of the estate, which was then held by the trustees of his grandson, E. Sapte Blake.

== Architecture ==
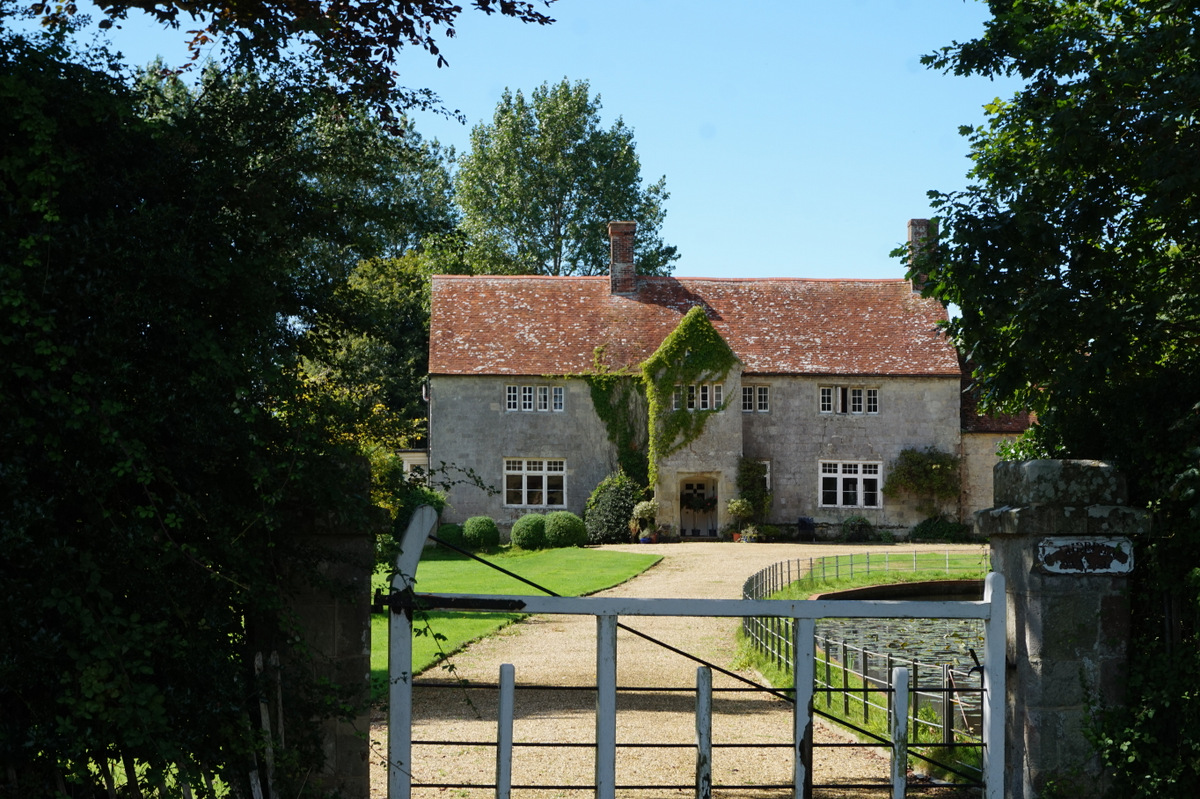
Great Burbridge Manor, Hampshire (2015) by Ian S

The manor has a small double-fronted façade with an arch door, indicative of a small manor house. It is built with bricks. The upper floor has mullioned windows. The house, a simple Jacobean structure with stone mullioned windows, is low but picturesque. A projecting porch, dated 1668 as an addition, was part of a renovation. Although now modernised, it retains much of its early character.
