= Whitwell Halt railway station =

Former railway station in Isle of Wight, UK

Coordinates: 50.6018°N 1.2636°W

Whitwell Halt
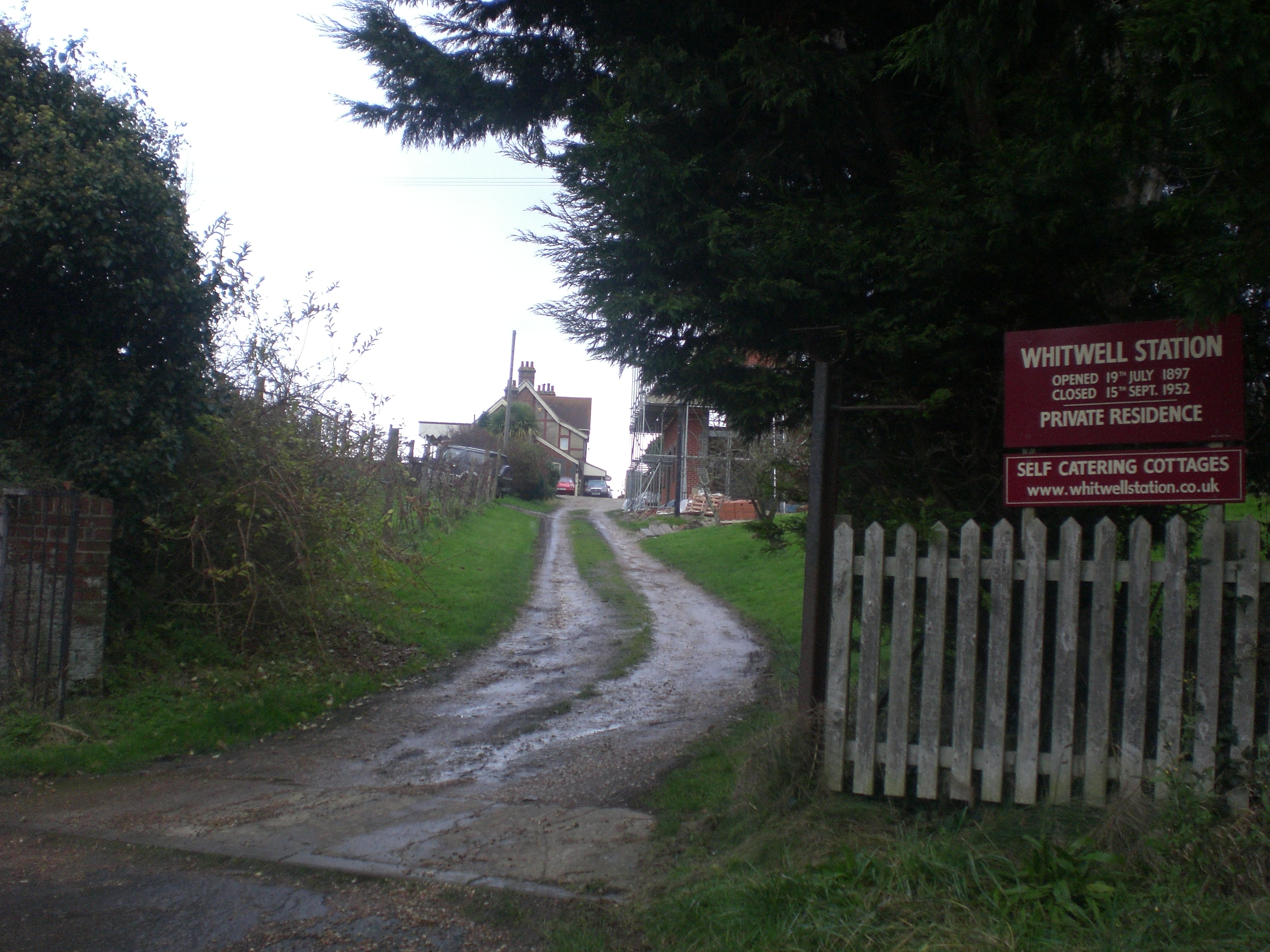
- The entrance to Whitwell Station in late 2008.

General information
- Location: Whitwell, Isle of Wight; England
- Platforms: 2

Other information
- Status: Disused

History
- Original company: Newport, Godshill and St Lawrence Railway
- Pre-grouping: Isle of Wight Central Railway
- Post-grouping: Southern Railway; Southern Region of British Railways

Key dates
- 20 July 1897: Opened as Whitwell
- 1 July 1941: Renamed Whitwell Halt
- 15 September 1952: Closed
Location

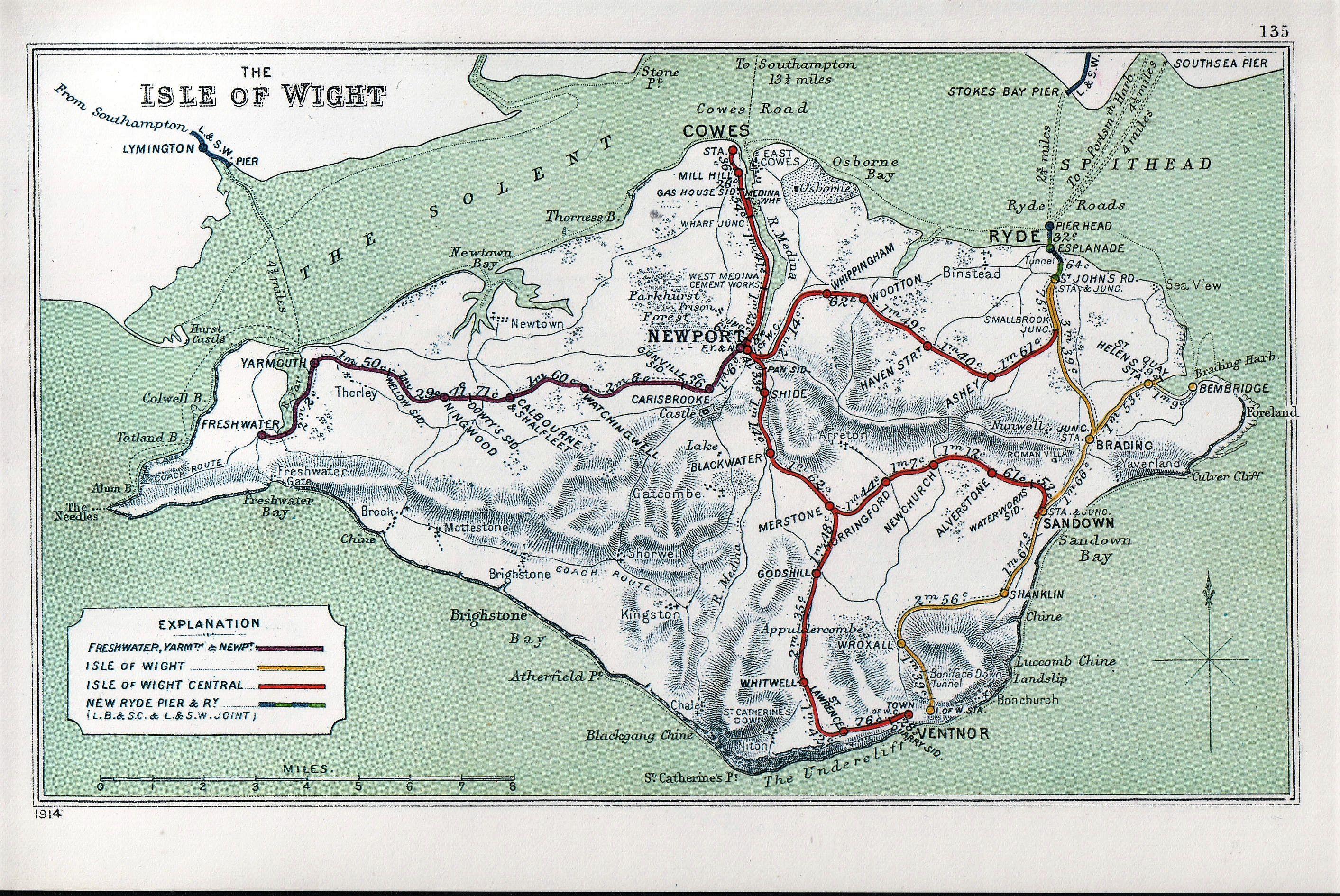
A 1914 Railway Clearing House map of lines around The Isle of Wight.

Whitwell Station, on the Ventnor West branch of the Isle of Wight Central Railway, was opened on 20 July 1897 along with the other stations on the branch (with the exception of Ventnor West which opened in 1900). It was equipped with a passing loop, two platforms, a signal box and a substantial station building.

== History ==
The station was opened on 20 July 1897, and was originally named Whitwell. At the time of opening the route was popular featuring a passing loop and two platforms, the only station on the line to have this. It was renamed Whitwell Halt on 1 July 1941.

== Stationmasters ==
- James Cooper ca. 1899
- Samuel John Urry ca. 1907 (afterwards station master at Freshwater)
- F. Newland from 1908 (formerly station master at Freshwater)
- Mr. Hawkins ca. 1935

== Present ==
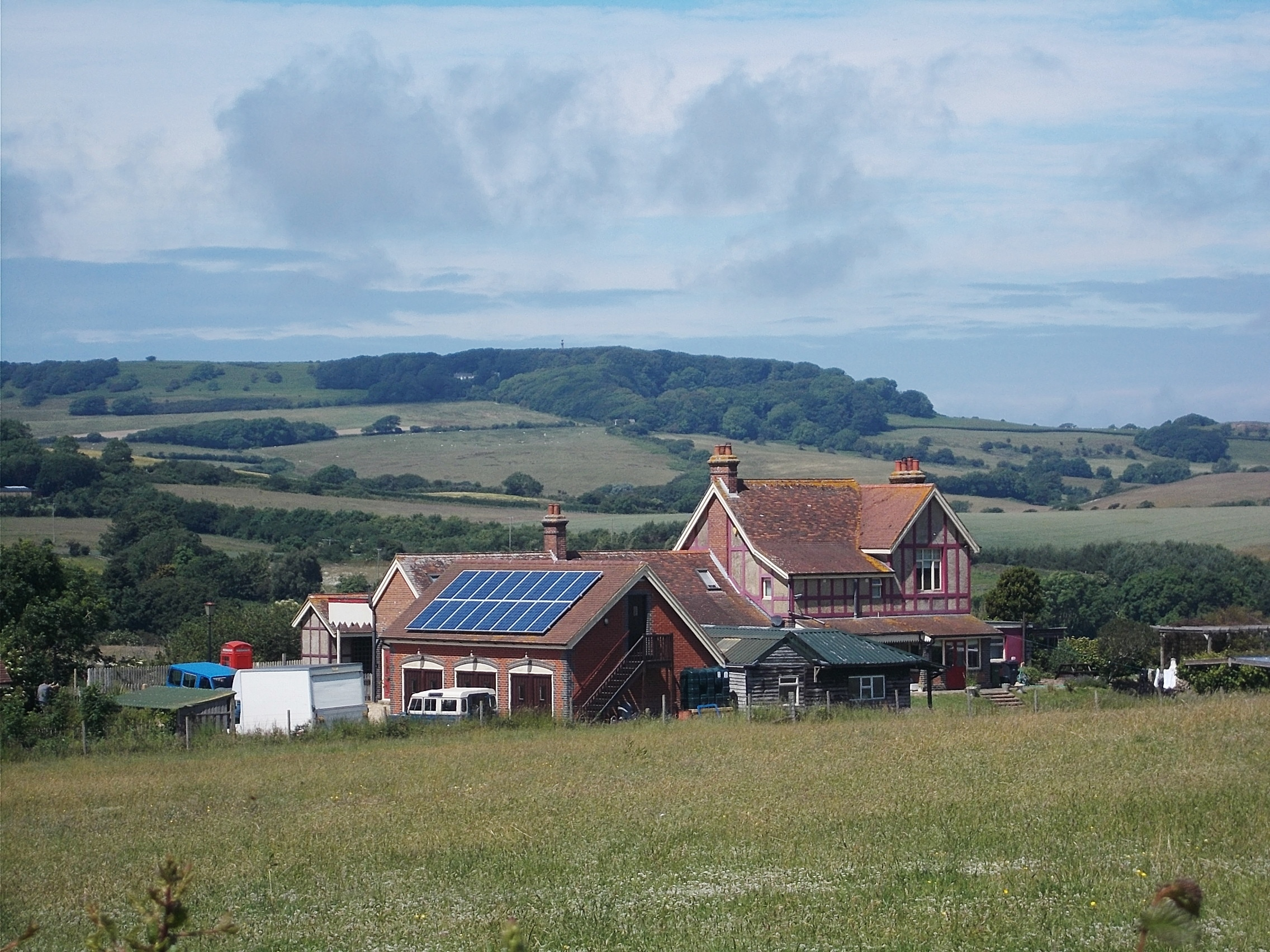
Former station buildings, with some modern alterations and additions

The station is now a private dwelling house, but a good deal of its original railway-station features remain, such as the waiting shelter on the old up platform, which has been restored.

== Location ==
Unlike neighbouring Godshill, the station was closer to the community it was meant to serve. It also served the nearby villages of Niton and Chale.

Preceding station	Disused railways	Following station
St Lawrence	British Railways; Southern Region; IoW CR : Ventnor West branch	Godshill

== Other stations on the branch ==
The other stations on the Ventnor West branch were:

- Merstone (where the branch joined the Newport-Sandown line)
- Godshill
- St Lawrence (the original terminus of the line from 1897 to 1900)
- Ventnor West
