= St Lawrence railway station (Isle of Wight) =

Former railway station in Isle of Wight, UK

Coordinates: 50.5874°N 1.2457°W

St Lawrence
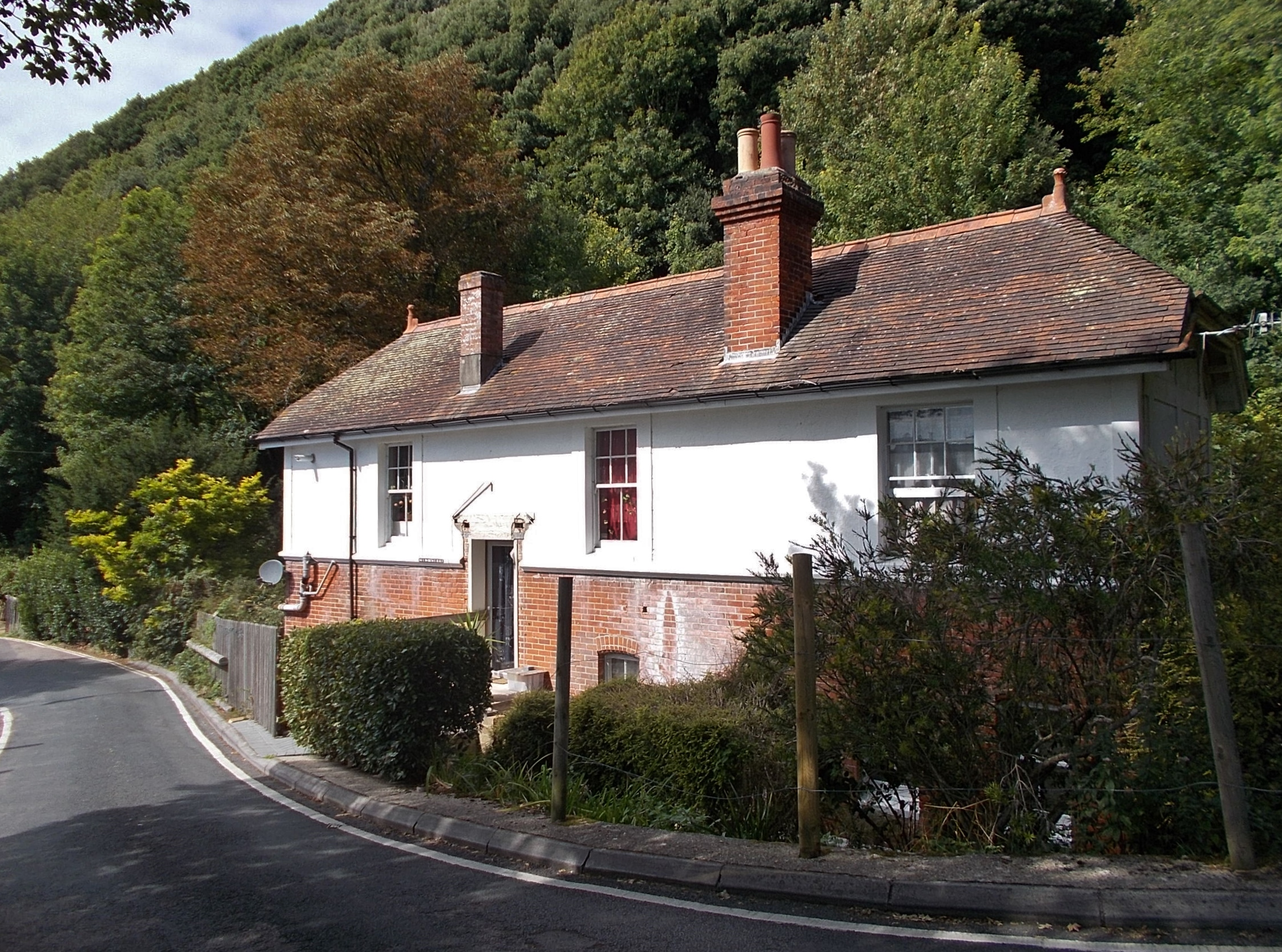
- The former station building in 2018, now a private residence

General information
- Location: St Lawrence, Isle of Wight; England
- Platforms: 1

Other information
- Status: Disused

History
- Pre-grouping: Newport, Godshill and St Lawrence Railway (1897-1913); Isle of Wight Central Railway (1913 to 1923)
- Post-grouping: Southern Railway (1923 to 1948); Southern Region of British Railways (1948 to 1952)

Key dates
- 20 July 1897: Opened
- 15 September 1952: Closed
Location

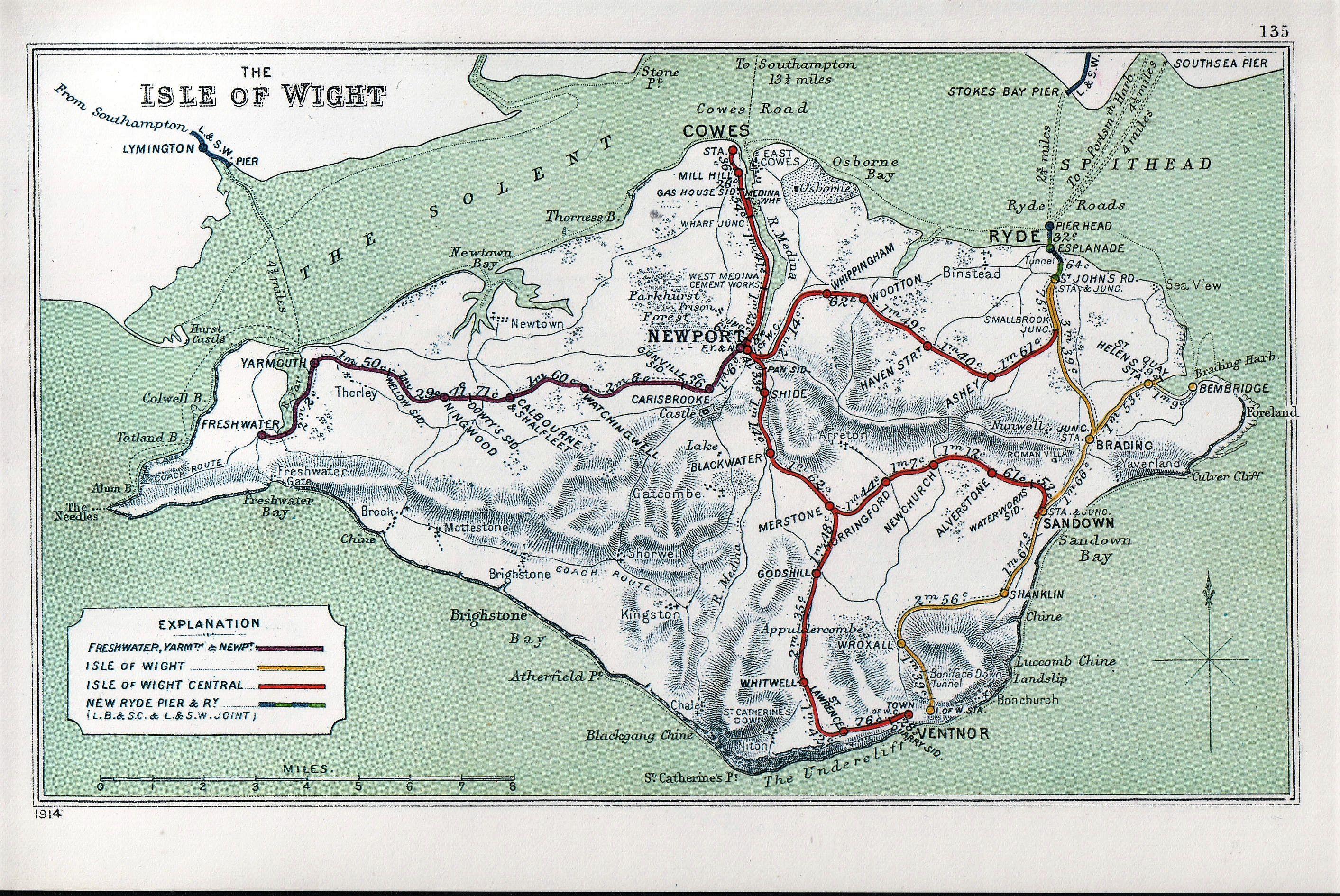
A 1914 Railway Clearing House map of lines around The Isle of Wight.

St Lawrence railway station is a former railway station in the village of St Lawrence on the Isle of Wight.

== History ==
It opened in 1897 and was the original terminus of the branch line from Merstone until the 1½ mile extension to Ventnor was completed in June 1900. From 1927 the station was downgraded to the status of an unstaffed halt.

== Stationmasters ==
- William Bayley ca. 1899 (afterwards station master at Ventnor Town)
- E. Wadmore 1905 - 1912
- Charles Dennett ca. 1920 (afterwards station master at Yarmouth)

== Location ==
The station was located between a steep cliff face and a public road. During the early years of the line's operation, rock falls were common. This problem was alleviated when the undergrowth took hold on the cliff face.

The short distance between the south portal of the St. Lawrence tunnel and the station was widely regarded as one of the finest views to be had on the island's railways.

Today the station building is a private residence. The trackbed has been filled in up to the level of the platform. The steep road bridge crossing at the eastern end of the station is still evident. The trackbed towards Ventnor is now covered by modern housing.

Preceding station	Disused railways	Following station
Ventnor West	British Railways; Southern Region; IoW CR : Ventnor West branch line	Whitwell

== Other stations on the branch ==
The other stations on the Ventnor West branch were:

- Merstone (where the branch joined the Newport-Sandown line)
- Godshill
- Whitwell
- Ventnor West
