= Horringford railway station =

Isle of Wight UK station, 1875–1956

Coordinates: 50°39′57″N 1°13′57″W

Horringford
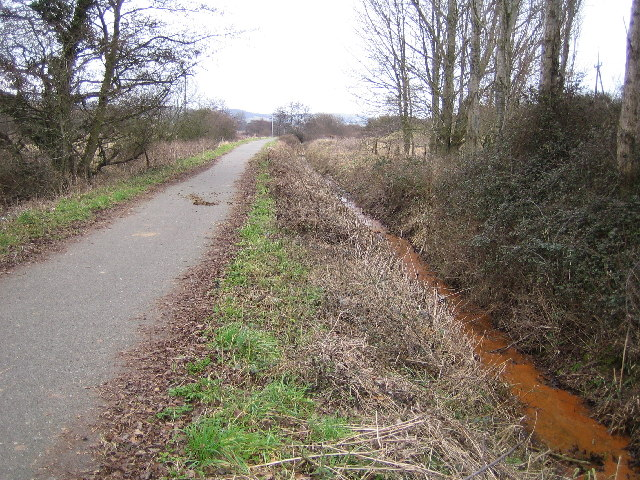
- The track bed near Horringford Station is now a cycle path.

General information
- Location: Horringford, Isle of Wight; England
- Grid reference: SZ543853
- Platforms: 1

Other information
- Status: Disused

History
- Pre-grouping: Isle of Wight (Newport Junction) Railway (1868Inc);1875-1887); Isle of Wight Central Railway (1887 to 1923)
- Post-grouping: Southern Railway (1923 to 1948); Southern Region of British Railways (1948 to 1956)

Key dates
- 1 February 1875: Opened
- 6 February 1956: Closed
Location

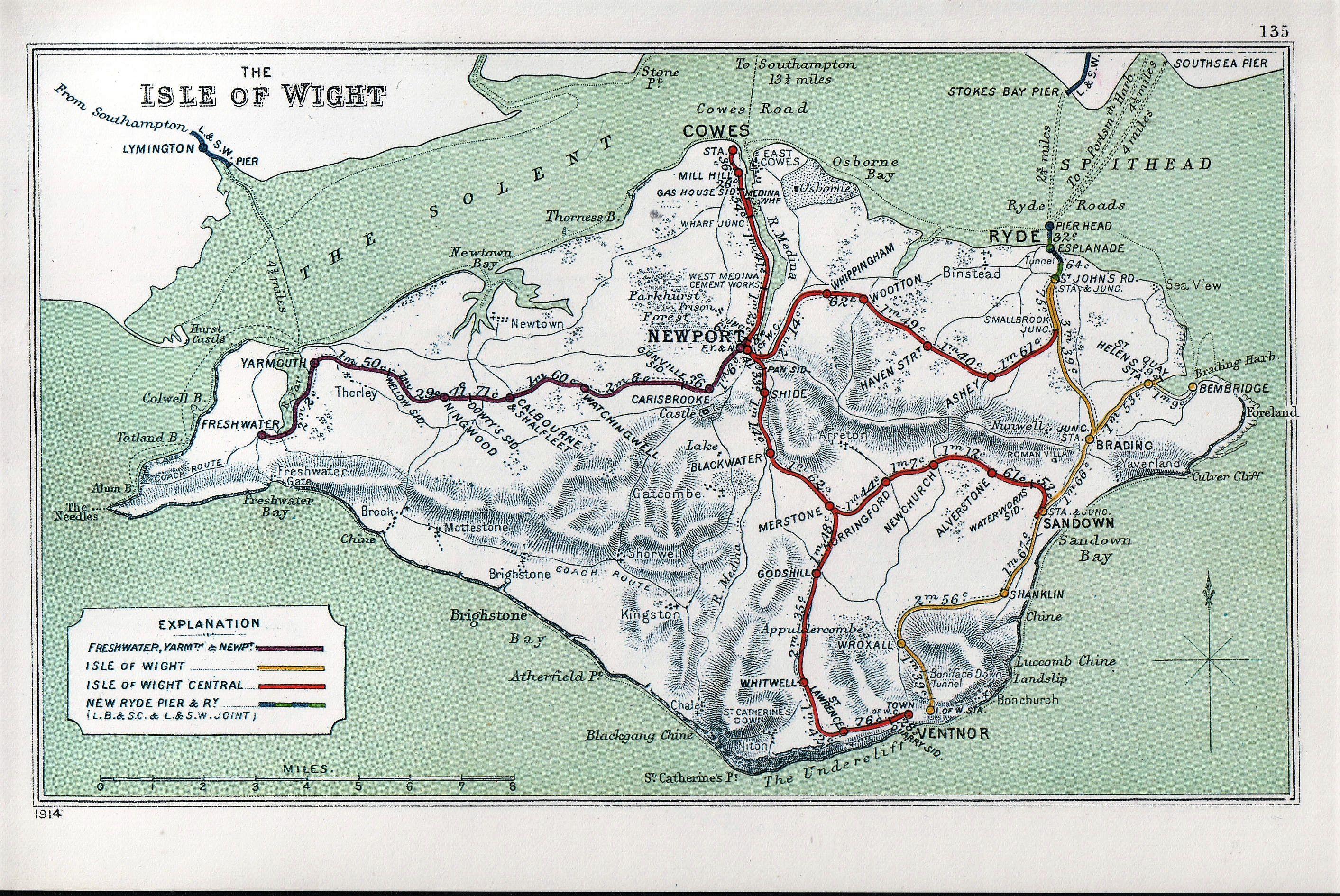
A 1914 Railway Clearing House map of lines around The Isle of Wight.

Horringford railway station was an intermediate station situated on the edge of Horringford village on the line from Newport to Sandown incorporated by the Isle of Wight (Newport Junction) Railway in 1868.

== History ==
An unofficial passenger service operated by the contractor ran from 28 May until 27 July 1872. The station was officially opened in 1875 and closed 81 years later in 1956. In its early years it was busy on market days when farmers took their cattle to Newport market, and in later years it carried the local sugar beet trade. The station survives as a private house.

== Stationmasters ==
- Frederick George Drudge ca. 1881–1889 (formerly station master at Haven Street, afterwards station master at Freshwater)
- Mr. Tutton from 1889
- F. Drake ca. 1906
- Frederick Dew ca. 1910 ca. 1915

Preceding station	Disused railways	Following station
Newchurch	British Railways; Southern Region; IoW CR : Sandown to Newport line	Merstone

== See also ==
- List of closed railway stations in Britain
