= Merstone =

Coordinates: 50.65984°N 1.2544°W

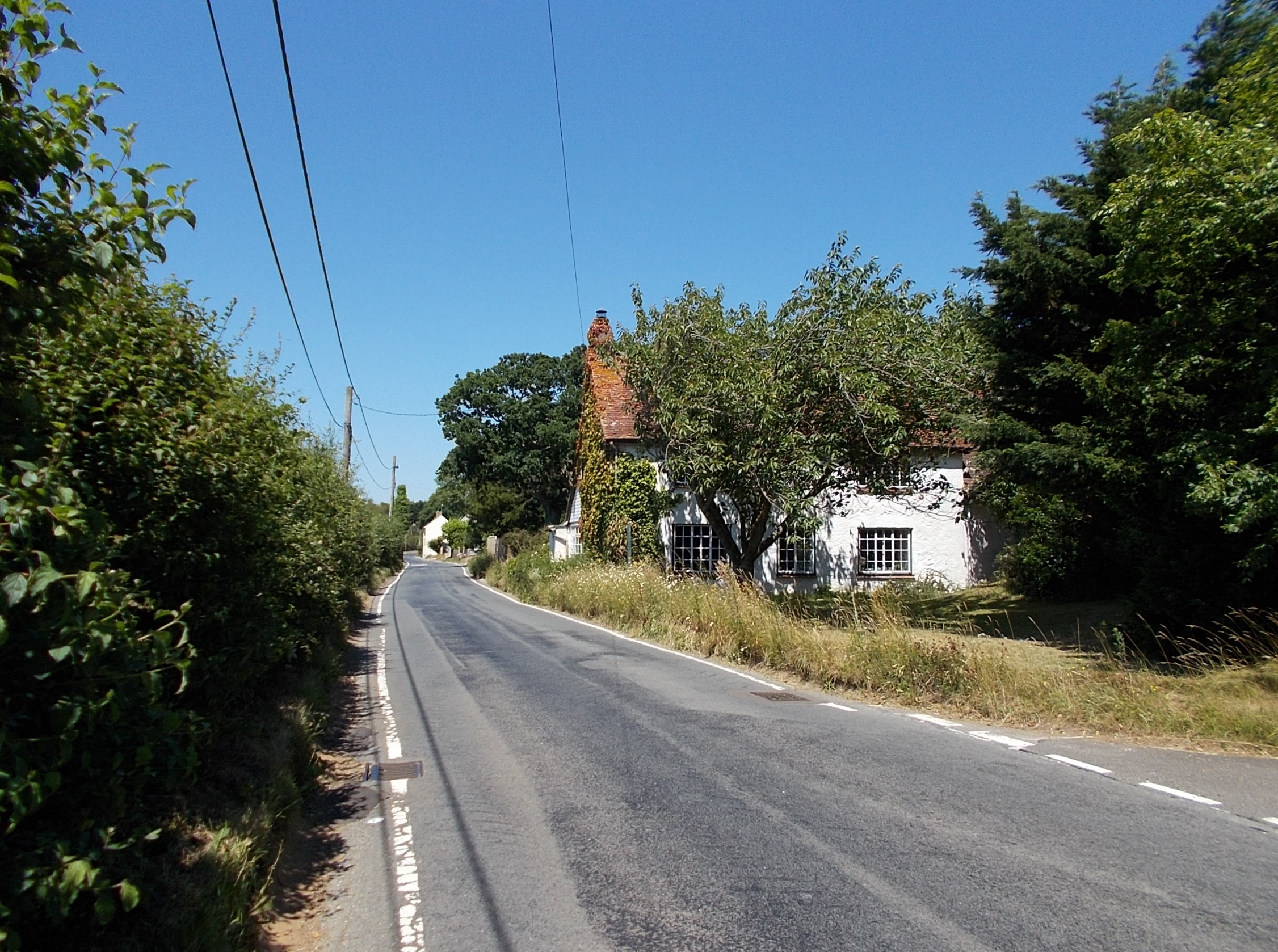

- Location within the Isle of Wight
- OS grid reference: SZ527847
- Unitary authority: Isle of Wight
- Ceremonial county: Isle of Wight
- Region: South East
- Country: England
- Sovereign state: United Kingdom
- Post town: NEWPORT
- Postcode district: PO30
- Dialling code: 01983
- Police: Hampshire and Isle of Wight
- Fire: Hampshire and Isle of Wight
- Ambulance: Isle of Wight
- UK Parliament: Isle of Wight West

Merstone (also spelled Merston) is a hamlet on the Isle of Wight. It is located near the centre of the Island, roughly equidistant from Blackwater to the northwest, Horringford to the east, and Godshill to the south. The hamlet's population under the 2021 Census was included in the civil parish of Arreton.

== Name ==
The name means 'the farmstead by or on the marshy ground', from Old English mersc and tūn. Merston in West Sussex has the same origin.

1086: Messetone, Merestone

~1200: Merston

1271: Merstone

1349: Mershton

== History ==
Merstone is home to Merston Manor, built in 1605 in the Jacobean style by Edward Cheeke, and rebuilt in the Victorian era. Merston Manor was first mentioned in the Domesday Book, and the present structure is arguably the oldest brick house on the Island. Prior to the Norman Conquest, Merston Manor was owned by the Brictuin family. The manor now belongs to the Crofts family.

== Transport ==
In 1875 Merstone station was opened on the Newport to Sandown railway line. In 1897 the station became the starting point of a branch opened by the Isle of Wight Central Railway to St. Lawrence, and completed to Ventnor West in 1900. In 1952 the branch closed, and in 1956, the station and original railway line skirting the hamlet were also closed. The island platform of the former station is still visible adjacent to National Cycle Route 23.

Public transport is now provided by Southern Vectis on Route 2, which operates between Newport and Sandown via Shanklin including intermediate villages.

== Notable people ==
Well-known island architect Percy Goddard Stone, born 15 March 1856, died in The Cottage at Merstone on 21 March 1934. Stone was responsible for many stone monuments on the Island, such as the County War memorial at Carisbrooke Castle, and war memorials in Arreton, Bembridge and Yarmouth, as well as the Queen Victoria memorial in Newport and churches in Wootton and Cowes.
