= Godshill railway station =

Former railway station in Isle of Wight, UK

Coordinates: 50.6360°N 1.2637°W

Godshill
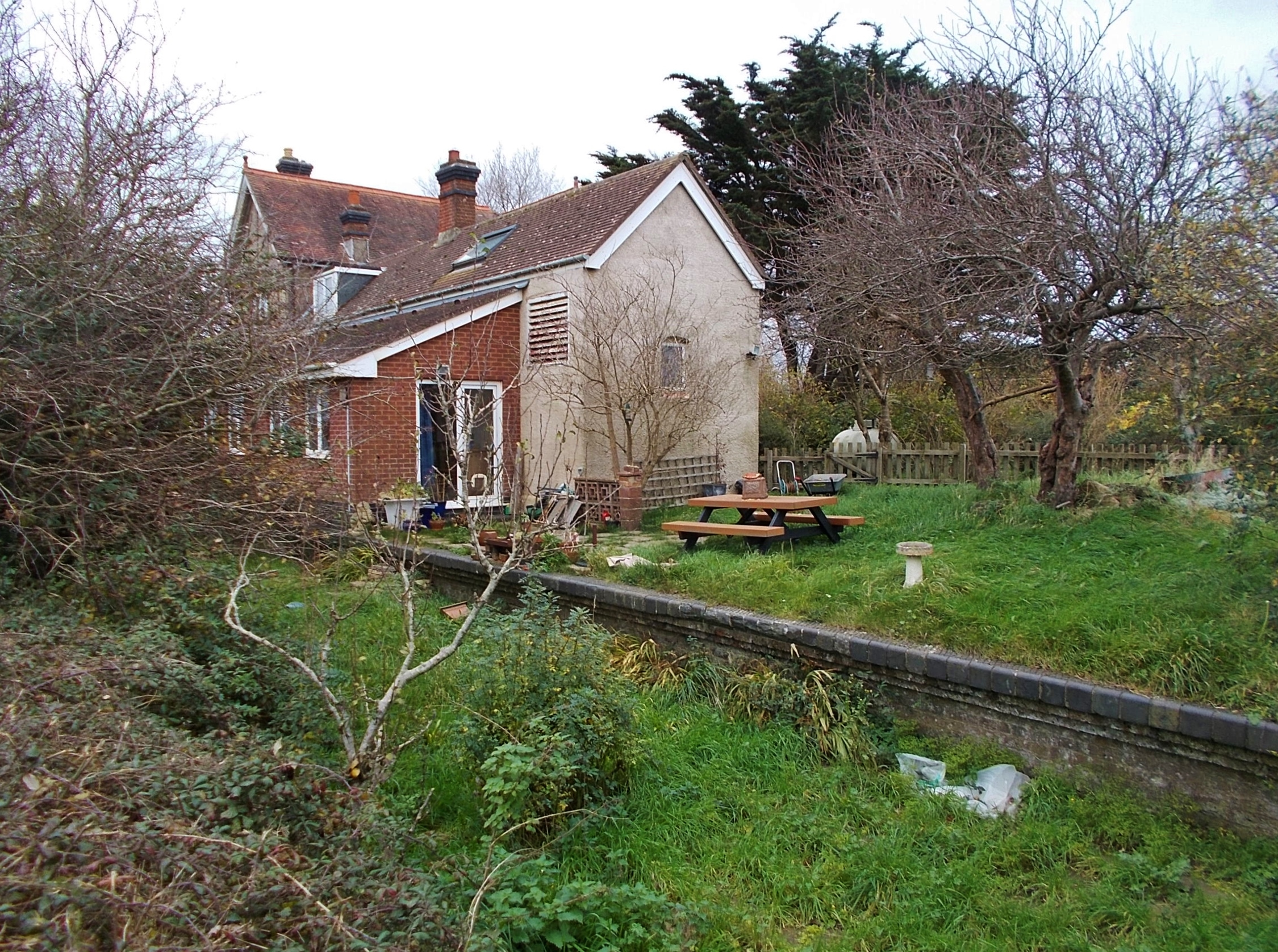
- The old station in 2017, now a private residence. The platform is still clearly visible, with a modern extension built over part of it.

General information
- Location: Godshill, Isle of Wight; England
- Platforms: 1

Other information
- Status: Disused

History
- Original company: Newport, Godshill and St Lawrence Railway
- Pre-grouping: Isle of Wight Central Railway
- Post-grouping: Southern Railway; Southern Region of British Railways

Key dates
- 20 July 1897: Opened as Godshill
- 1928: Renamed Godshill Halt for Sandford
- 15 September 1952: Closed
Location

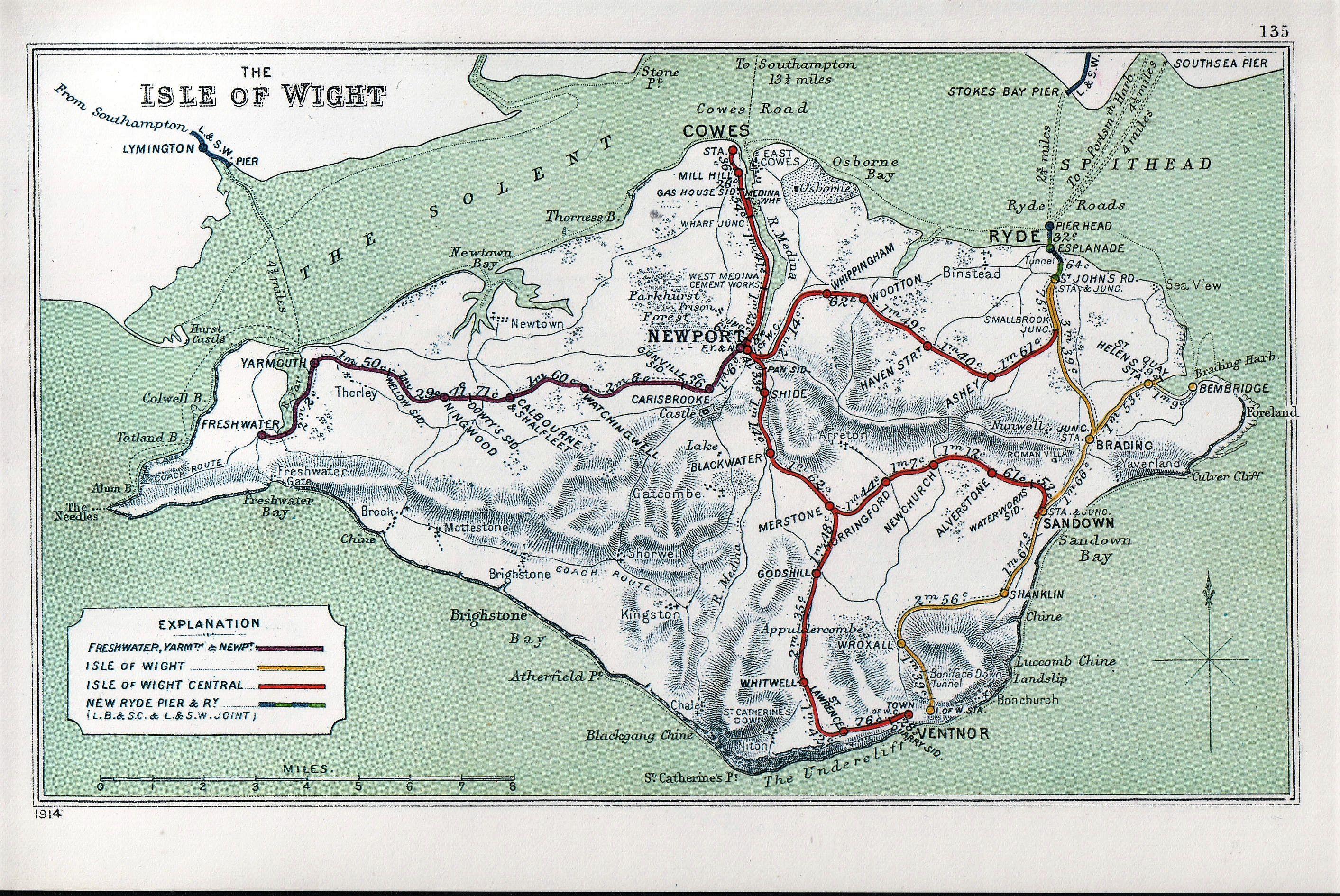
A 1914 Railway Clearing House map of lines around The Isle of Wight.

Godshill station was at Godshill on the Isle of Wight on the Newport, Godshill & St Lawrence Railway, later the Isle of Wight Central Railway.

== History ==
It opened on 20 July 1897 as a single platform station with a small goods siding and this layout remained until closure. The station was reduced to the status of an unstaffed halt in 1927.

The station was not a financial success and never brought a large income to managers. There was some agricultural traffic, notably milk, and a few local passengers until the bus services became well established.

== Stationmasters ==
- William Froud ca. 1898 ca. 1901
- Harry Alfred Phillips ca. 1910 ca. 1911
- Frederick William Henry Stay 1917 - 1923

== Location ==
The station was surrounded by fields but at the same time ½ mile from the centre of the village. This is still the case today. The platform still stands and the station buildings have been converted into private dwellings.

Preceding station	Disused railways	Following station
Whitwell	British Railways; Southern Region; IoW CR : Ventnor West branch	Merstone

== Other stations on the branch ==
The other stations on the Ventnor West branch were:

- Merstone (where the branch joined the Newport-Sandown line)
- Whitwell
- St. Lawrence (the original terminus of the line from 1897 to 1900)
- Ventnor West
