= Merstone Manor =

Manor House in Merstone, Isle of Wight, United Kingdom

Coordinates: 50.6663°N 1.2635°W

Merstone Manor (previously: Merestone, frequently spelled Merston) is a manor house in Merstone on the Isle of Wight, England. The manor was first mentioned in the Domesday Book. Prior to the Norman Conquest, Merston Manor was owned by the Brictuin family. The present house, built in 1605 in the Jacobean style by Edward Cheeke, was completely rebuilt using mainly the original materials in 1894 the house having been unoccupied and was derelict by 1891. The interior was also remodelled. This structure may be the oldest brick house on the Island. The manor now belongs to the Crofts family.

== Geography ==
At a short distance from the town of Newport and almost in the very centre of the island, there starts in an easterly direction, a range of lofty downs which occupies one half of the longer axis of the Isle of Wight. From St George's Down where they commence, passing Arreton, Mersley, Ashey, and Brading Downs, then bridging over the Brading valley, and continuing on to Bembridge and Culver Down, they measure an almost straight length of a little over eight miles. At their feet lies one of the most fertile valleys in the Island, protected almost entirely from the north and north-east winds, by the long range of down. At the present time, the district is noted for the large size of many of the fields, some of which approach, if they do not exceed eighty acres in extent. Through the midst of the valley flows the eastern Yar, and abundance of water is obtained from wells attached to every farm and nearly every cottage. From the summit of the Downs, the traveller sees in the spring, the beautiful rich brown earth, in the summer extensive fields of wheat, and in the early nights of autumn, the lights of the farm houses, and of the cottages in the villages can be most plainly discerned, whilst at the sea end of the valley, the two towns of Sandown and Shanklin are conspicuous by the rows of lights in their streets. In the very bottom of the valley, not far from its western end lies the hamlet of Merstone, and near to a Manor House where, in centuries gone by, have dwelt Saxon, Norman and English owners, traces of whose occupations still remain.

== Early history ==
Domesday Book, in the entry referring to Merstone, tells us that in the time of Edward the Confessor, the manor was held by Brictuin, and that he held it allodially of King Edward. Brictuin was apparently a man in high position. The manor had probably comedown to him from his ancestors, and he owed suit and service to no superior, save only to his lord the King. The entry is: "William Fitz-Stur holds Merestone and Hunfrid under him. Brictuin held it allodially of King Edward. Then and now it was assessed at half a hide. There is one carucate in demesne with one villein. Was and is worth ios." There is no mention of a church as Merstone lies within the parish of Arreton, and at no great distance from its church. The manor is only taxed at half a hide, and the largest meaning given to a hide 1 would appear to make the manor consist of only from 60 to 80 acres, an extent of manorial holding, quite inconsistent with the idea of Brictuin being a powerful and wealthy man. It is at this distance of time most difficult, if not impossible, to ascertain what were the boundaries of the old manor, but, guided by its more recent dimensions, the manor must have contained when held by Brictuin at least 300 acres. That he was only taxed for 60 or 80 acres is an indication of the powerful position held by Brictuin, whether acquired either by himself or by his ancestors. William the Conqueror when he bestowed the manor on his powerful subject William Fitz-Stur, did not increase the amount of tax to be paid, "it was, and is worth ios.," as we have seen from Domesday.

As there is good reason to assume the high position and wealth of Brictuin, we may fairly conclude that he had a house here at Merstone, and that in this immediate neighbourhood there stood, nearly two thousand years ago, the original of the present manor house, but whether on its actual site we cannot now determine. William Fitz-Stur received from the Conqueror twenty manors in the Isle of Wight, of which at least four were held under him by Saxon tenants. Merstone was held by Hunfrid, and the presence of this subtenant again indicates that there was a house in the time of the Conqueror.

Merstone, or as it was called in Domesday, Merestone, was only a small manor, and has not left any mark in the history of the Isle of Wight. It appears to have remained from the time of the partition after the Conquest (1066) till past the middle of the reign of Edward I (1283), in the possession of William Fitz-Stur, and his descendants. Among the liberties claimed by Isabella de Fortibus, Lady of the Isle of Wight, in the 8th year of Edward I (1280), it is stated that Domina de Whitfield, the Lady of Whitfield, holds from Matilda de Estur six holdings in the Isle of Wight, and amongst them Merstone. The family of Fitz-Stur had gradually dropped the Fitz out of their name, and adopted the name de Estur. Lady Matilda was the heiress of the property of the de Esturs, which she carried by marriage into the family of Lisle or de Insula. The Domina de Whitfield, who held the manor of Merstone as tenant of Lady Matilda de Estur, was according to Mr. Stone,1 the consort of Edward I, Merstone, however, cannot put forward any claim that it was a residence of a queen of England.

In an inquisition taken in the 7th year of Edward III (1334) occurs an entry that Robert Giros, now Geoffrey de Insula, Robcrtus Girus nunc Galfridus de Insula, tenet quartam partem in Merston, held a fourth part of a farm at Merstone. Since we cannot find any clue to this Robert de Giros, we can only surmise that he came to the Island, and for some reason held land at Merstone, which afterwards came into the possession of Geoffrey de Insula.

How long Merstone remained in the family of de Insula, has not so far been ascertained, but after a time it passed with an heiress into the family of Cheke. Sir John Oglander tells us that the original name of this family was "Chekehill because they lived at Whippinghame on ye hill." About 1374 they obtained possession of Mottestone, not far from Brook in the West Medine, and eventually also became owners of Merstone, which in the latter half of the 16th century was held by Edward Cheke, who married three times. His first wife was a daughter of a Mr. Thomas Dennys, and his third, Ann, of the family of Percivall, of Somersetshire. He had no children by either of these wives, and thus they have no further connection with the history of Merstone. His second wife was Elinor, the daughter of Sir William Oglander, of Nunwell, and sister of Sir John Oglander, the author of the Memoirs. This marriage must have taken place between 1550 and 1600. Edward Cheke and his wife were the builders of the manor, house that now stands at Merstone. Sir John Oglander, his brother-in-law, who provided most of the timber,1 calls it " the new house " and so implies the existence of an old one.

In the walls of the house are to be found two varieties of building material. The lower portion of the wall is built of a local stone found in the greensand. The upper portion of the west, or principal, front is composed of bricks that by their size indicate that they were made prior to the Order in Council of Charles I in 1625, which fixed the size of bricks at 10 inches long, by inches wide, and 2 inches thick. The bricks of which this house is built are 9 inches long by 4 inches wide, and if inches thick. The eastern front is built of bricks and stones in a promiscuous manner, the old grey stones, and probably other material forming part of the old house that was here before Edward Cheke built the new one. Whilst brick and stone thus form the exterior portion of the walls, which are from 24 to 36 inches in thickness, the interior is mainly, if not altogether, composed of blocks of chalk. The entrance door, apparently the original one, is a good specimen of the workmanship of the period, and still has its old hinges and the original drop, handle of iron. The hall was a room measuring 45 feet in length by 20 in breadth, but is now cut up by two partition walls. Most noticeable in the hall is the rich, flat-arched fireplace, six feet wide. In the kitchen, in its original place, is the large copper used formerly for the brewing of beer. The opening in the floor and wall through which passed a tube or shoot for leading the beer to the barrels in the cellar is still to be seen. In this cellar are two beams of oak, stopchamfered, and supporting the floor above.1 The details indicate that the work was very carefully done, and the ornamentation would suggest that the beams belonged to the older house that previously stood here. The staircase has a broad roomy stairway, and, though not elaborate in detail, the ornamentation of the balusters and handrail is characteristic of the Jacobean period. In the rooms on the first floor are three carved oak mantel-pieces. One of these is ornamented with the Tudor rose; the other two appear to be of later date, as they are examples of the meaningless ornamentation in vogue in the time of the Stuarts. In two of the rooms there still remains a large amount of oak panelling. Above this floor are extensive garrets, extending over the entire house. The original mullioned windows that still exist in the roof indicate that at one time it was divided into several rooms, although at the present time, and for many years past, occupied by a colony of owls. The roof, now covered with slates, was, up to about sixty years ago, a most splendid specimen of thatch work.

Edward Cheke, the builder of the house, according to Sir John Oglander, had three sons and a daughter. The daughter Francis died at a school near Salisbury. Of the sons, John died in the wars in the Low Country; Henry died in the "Isle of Rez;" and Edward, the second son, " maryed Grace, ye daughter of William Broade, a shopkeper of Newporte."

The Manor of Merstone remained with the descendants of Edward and Elinor Cheke till the time of Charles II. It was then purchased by Eustace Mann, the owner of Osborne. His granddaughter, Elizabeth Mann, carried by her marriage Merstone, as well as Osborne, into the family of Blachford. During the last 150 years the property has passed to different owners. It is now owned by the Lord and Lady Merston (the Crofts family).
