= Ventnor West Branch =

Section of railway on Isle of Wight

The Ventnor West Branch was the final addition to the Isle of Wight railway network, and used an earlier scheme to run a railway from Shanklin to the railwayless south-west part of the island.

== History ==
Shanklin and Chale Railway Act 1885
- Act of Parliament
- Parliament of the United Kingdom
- Long title: An Act for incorporating the Shanklin and Chale Railway Company and for other purposes.
- Citation: 48 & 49 Vict. c. cxcii

Dates
- Royal assent: 14 August 1885

Shanklin and Chale Railway Act 1887
- Act of Parliament
- Parliament of the United Kingdom
- Long title: An Act to authorise the Shanklin and Chale Railway Company to make certain branch railways in connection with their authorized railway in the Isle of Wight; and for other purposes.
- Citation: 50 & 51 Vict. c. clxiv

Dates
- Royal assent: 8 August 1887

Newport, Godshill, and St. Lawrence Railway Act 1889
- Act of Parliament
- Parliament of the United Kingdom
- Long title: An Act to authorise the Shanklin and Chale Railway Company to make a railway from the Newport Junction Railway at Merston to St. Lawrence in the Isle of Wight; and to abandon certain authorised railways; and for other purposes.
- Citation: 52 & 53 Vict. c. cli

Dates
- Royal assent: 12 August 1889

Text of statute as originally enacted

The Shanklin and Chale Railway was incorporated by the Shanklin and Chale Railway Act 1885 (48 & 49 Vict. c. cxcii). Having come to an arrangement with the Isle of Wight Central Railway, the Shanklin and Chale Railway Company obtained the Newport, Godshill, and St. Lawrence Railway Act 1889 (52 & 53 Vict. c. cli), changing its name to the Newport Godshill and St. Lawrence Railway Company, and substituting new plans for those previously approved.

A railway five miles five furlongs and six chains in length commencing in the parish of Arreton by a junction with the Newport Junction Railway of the Isle of Wight Central Railway Company at a point distant half a chain or thereabouts in an easterly direction from the level crossing thereof by the road or lane called Merston Lane near Merston Station and terminating on the east side of the public road called Saint Lawrence Shute in the parish of Saint Lawrence at a point in the field numbered 14 on the 25-inch Ordnance map such point being distant eight and a half chains or thereabouts in a northeasterly direction from the north-east corner of Saint Lawrence Church and eleven chains or thereabouts in a north-westerly direction from the junction of the public road from Saint Lawrence to Whitwell with the public road from Ventnor to Freshwater. — Railway authorised by the Newport, Godshill, and St. Lawrence Railway Act 1889 (52 & 53 Vict. c. cli)

Newport, Godshill and St. Lawrence Railway Act 1892
- Act of Parliament
- Parliament of the United Kingdom
- Long title: An Act to authorise the Newport Godshill and St. Lawrence Railway Company to extend their Railway towards Ventnor and for other purposes.
- Citation: 55 & 56 Vict. c. ccxl

Dates
- Royal assent: 28 June 1892

Newport, Godshill, and St. Lawrence Railway Act 1896
- Act of Parliament
- Parliament of the United Kingdom
- Long title: An Act to authorise the Newport Godshill and St. Lawrence Railway Company to further improve and extend their Railway towards Ventnor and for other purposes.
- Citation: 59 & 60 Vict. c. xlvii

Dates
- Royal assent: 2 July 1896

Text of statute as originally enacted

Isle of Wight Central Railway (Godshill Transfer) Act 1913
- Act of Parliament
- Parliament of the United Kingdom
- Long title: An Act for transferring to and vesting in the Isle of Wight Central Railway Company the undertaking of the Newport Godshill and St. Lawrence Railway Company to confer further powers on the Isle of Wight Central Railway Company and for other purposes.
- Citation: 3 & 4 Geo. 5. c. xiii

Dates
- Royal assent: 4 July 1913

Text of statute as originally enacted

The branch was opened as the Newport, Godshill and St Lawrence Railway between Merstone and St. Lawrence on 20 July 1897. From the day of opening, the branch was operated by the Isle of Wight Central Railway. A temporary terminus was provided at St Lawrence until the extension was opened to Ventnor Town on 1 June 1900. The terminus was renamed Ventnor West by the Southern Railway.

The railway was acquired by the Isle of Wight Central Railway by the Isle of Wight Central Railway (Godshill Transfer) Act 1913 (3 & 4 Geo. 5. c. xiii).

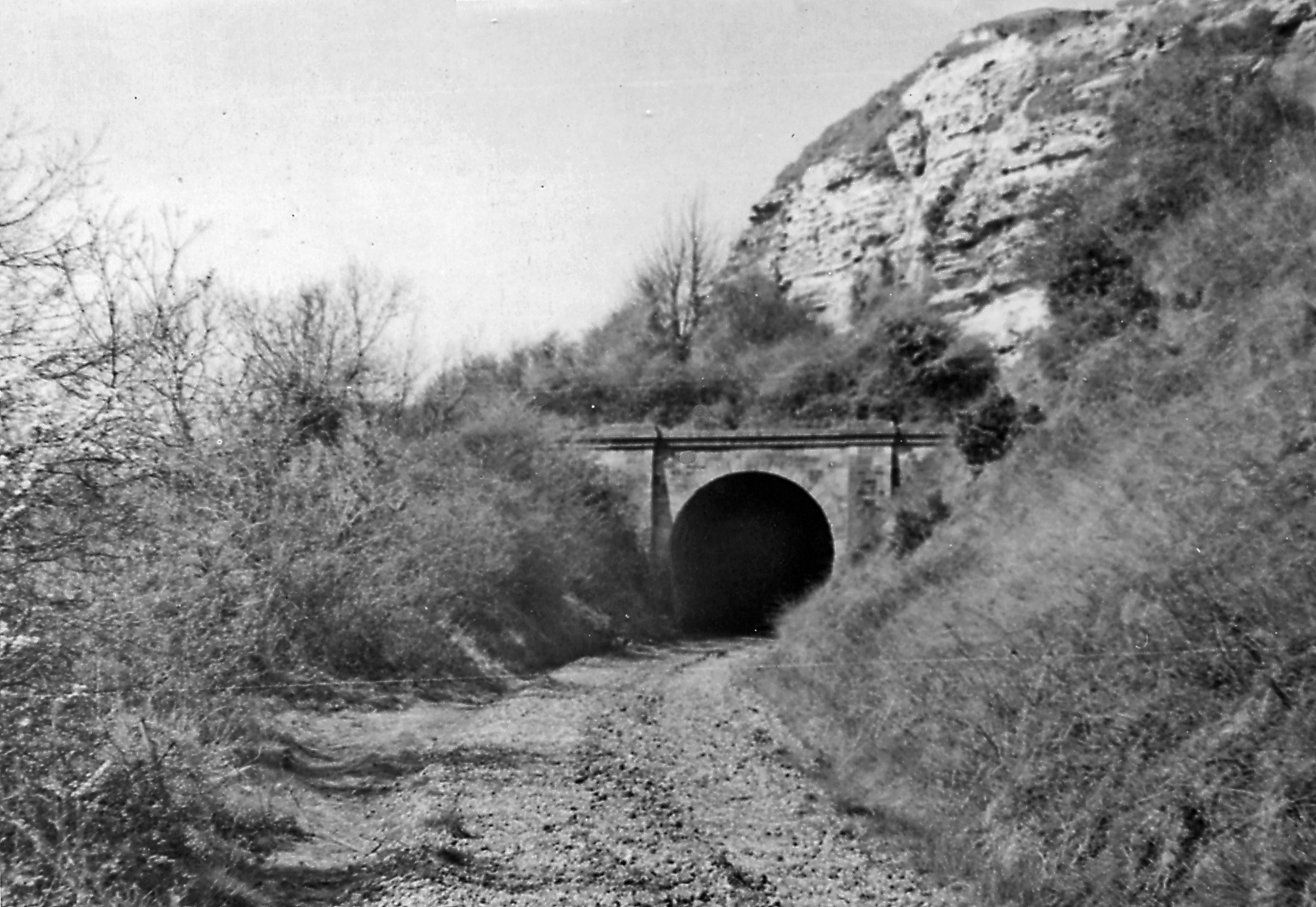
East end of St Lawrence Tunnel in 1954

In the days prior to the Grouping of the railways in 1923, the line struggled to make financial ends meet. However, after 1923 the services did improve and some of the increasing competition from road transport was lessened. An extensive programme of modernisation was undertaken by the Southern Railway, albeit with secondhand equipment from the mainland. Some economies were made on the branch by the Southern Railway, most notably the removal of the passing loop and signal box at Whitwell in 1928. The footbridge at Dean level crossing on the outskirts of Whitwell was also removed around this time. The footbridge was re-erected at Wroxall.

Nationalisation in 1948 brought the British Railways emblem to the locomotives but few other significant operational changes. The passenger numbers remained low and the branch continued to lose revenue to more convenient bus services. It was no surprise when closure was announced for 15 September 1952. The branch was visited by a large number of enthusiasts in its final months.

Today all the station buildings are in residential use.

== The route described ==
From the junction at Merstone, the line turned south and continued through farmland to cross the main Newport-Shanklin road. The line then continued through farmland to Godshill.

From Godshill the line again traversed farmland on a large stretch of embankment that ran to the small hamlet of Southford on the outskirts of Whitwell.

From Whitwell the line climbed up to the northern portal of St. Lawrence tunnel, crossing the B3327 road at Dean level crossing before reaching the tunnel itself.

The line entered the tunnel and began a long descent to St Lawrence and the terminus at Ventnor West.

== Stations ==
- Merstone
- Godshill
- Whitwell
- St Lawrence
- Ventnor West

== Bibliography ==
- Allen, Sir Peter; MacLeod, A. B. (1986). Rails in the Isle of Wight (2nd ed.). David & Charles. ISBN 978-0-7153-8701-6.
- Paye, Peter (1992). The Ventnor West Branch. Didcot: Wild Swan. ISBN 978-1-874103-02-8.
