= Henry de Botebrigge =

Henry de Botebrigge or Henry of Budbridge (died c.1331) was a 13th–14th century abbot in the Isle of Wight. He was the Abbot of Quarr Abbey and once held the Great Budbridge Manor. His heir was Robert de Botebrigge, reported to have become heir in 1331 when he requested a grant.
