= Sir Tristram Dillington, 5th Baronet =

British Army officer, landowner and Whig politician

Sir Tristram Dillington, 5th Baronet (c. 1678–1721) of Knighton, Isle of Wight was a British Army officer, landowner and Whig politician who sat in the House of Commons between 1707 and 1721.

== Early life ==
Dillington was the third son of Sir Robert Dillington, 2nd Baronet of Knighton and his second wife. Hannah Webb, daughter of William Webb of Throgmorton Street, London. He was half-brother of Sir Robert Dillington, 3rd Baronet. He was admitted at Inner Temple in 1694 but being a younger son, joined the army

"Knighton the seat of George M Bisset Esq." Engraving by Richard Godfrey, 1781.

== Career ==
Dillington was an ensign in the 1st Foot Guards in 1701 and cornet in the 1st Dragoon Guards in 1703 and was present at the Battle of Blenheim. He succeeded his brother Sir John Dillington, 4th Baronet in the baronetcy on 5 March 1706. He also inherited Knighton Gorges Manor, which had belonged to his family since 1563. In 1707 he was a brevet captain in the Guards.

Dillington was returned unopposed as Member of Parliament for Newport (Isle of Wight) at a by-election on 3 March 1707. Meanwhile, he became a Lieutenant-colonel in the 17th Foot in 1708. He was listed as a Whig before and after the 1708 general election when he was returned unopposed again as MP for Newport. In 1709 he was captain and Lieutenant colonel in the Coldstream Guards. He voted for the impeachment of Dr Sacheverell in 1710. He did not stand for Parliament in 1710 nor in 1713.

Dillington was appointed Governor of Hurst Castle in 1716. He became a 2nd Major in 1717. He was also returned unopposed by the Administration as MP for Newport at a by-election on 22 July 1717. He voted with the Government in all recorded divisions and died during that Parliament.

== Death and legacy ==
Dillington died unmarried on 7 July 1721 aged 43. He left his sisters Mary and Hannah as heirs. Hannah died intestate and Mary died unmarried, leaving the estate in common between her nephew Maurice Bocland and her niece Jane wife of John Eyre.

Parliament of Great Britain
Preceded by The Lord Cutts; William Stephens	Member of Parliament for Newport (Isle of Wight); 1707–1710; With: William Stephens	Succeeded by John Richmond Webb; William Stephens
Preceded by James Stanhope; William Stephens	Member of Parliament for Newport (Isle of Wight); 1717– 1721; With: William Stephens	Succeeded by Thomas Stanwix; William Stephens
Baronetage of England
Preceded by John Dillington	Baronet (of Knighton); 1706-1721	Extinct
