= Merstone railway station =

Former railway station in Isle of Wight, UK

Coordinates: 50°39′29″N 1°15′23″W

Merstone
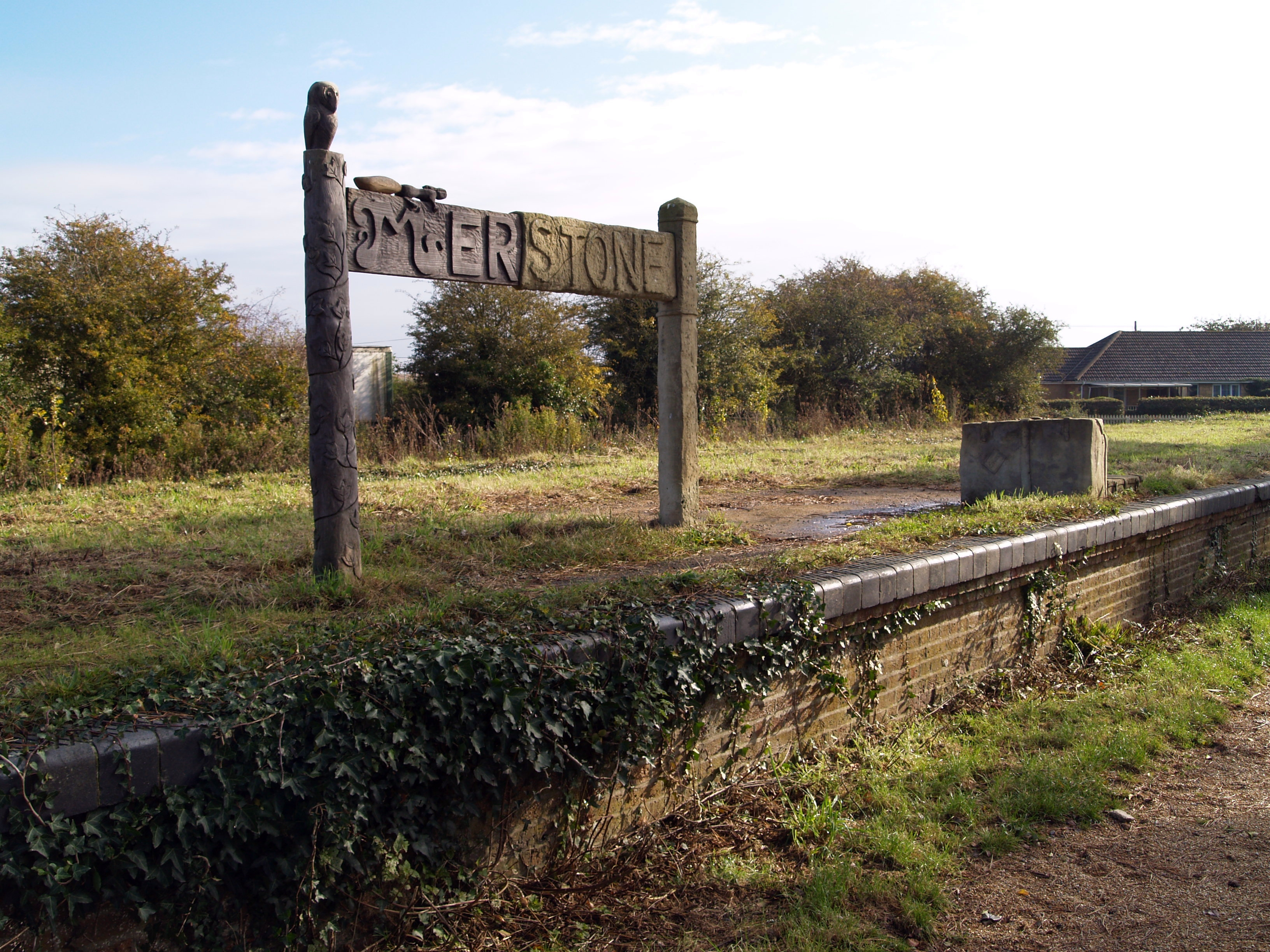
- Remains of Merstone Station

General information
- Location: Merstone, Isle of Wight; England
- Grid reference: SZ526845
- Platforms: 2

Other information
- Status: Disused

History
- Pre-grouping: Isle of Wight (Newport Junction) Railway (1868Inc);1875-1887); Isle of Wight Central Railway (1887 to 1923)/ Newport, Godshill & St Lawrence Railway (1897-1913); Isle of Wight Central Railway (1913 to 1923)
- Post-grouping: Southern Railway (1923 to 1948); Southern Region of British Railways (1948 to 1956)

Key dates
- 1 February 1875: Opened
- June 1897: resited other side of the level crossing
- 6 February 1956: Closed
Location

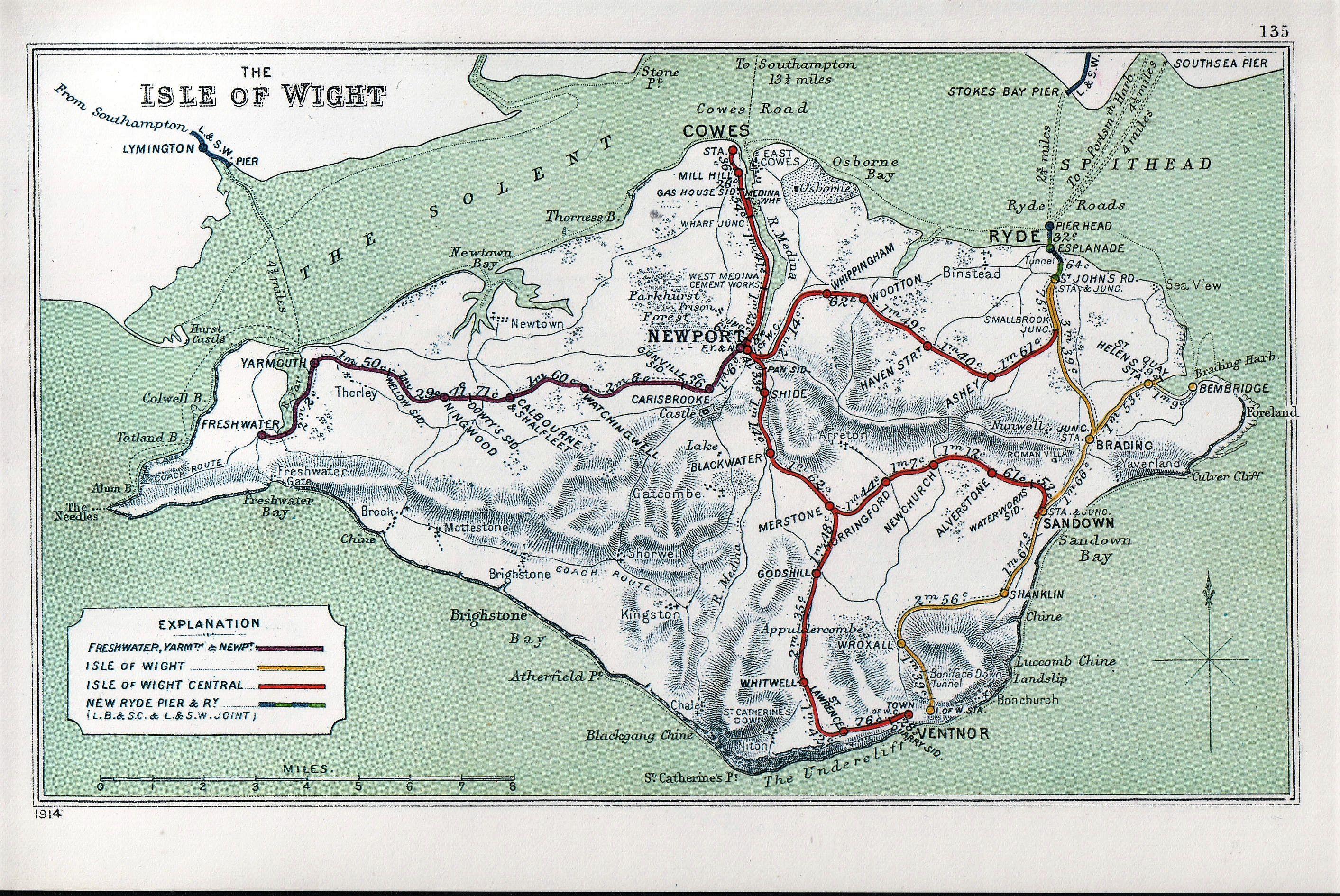
A 1914 Railway Clearing House map of lines around The Isle of Wight.

Merstone railway station, was an intermediate station situated on the edge of Merstone village on the line from Newport to Sandown incorporated by the Isle of Wight (Newport Junction) Railway in 1868

== History ==
It opened in 1875 and closed 81 years later. In 1897 a new line opened from Merstone to provide an alternative route to the south-east corner of the island, running initially to St Lawrence and in 1900 to Ventnor West station . Located in the heart of a farming community, Merstone was snowed under during the harsh winter of 1947. The station building was demolished after closure, although the platform is still existent. Merstone station is now an access point onto National Cycle Route 23

== Stationmasters ==
- Martin Conlan ca. 1881
- H. Frank Williams until 1897 (formerly station master at Newport)
- Frederick Newland from 1897
- J. Cooper ca. 1908
- Fred Rowlands ca. 1910
- Fred Mew ca. 1915
- Mr. Wheway ca. 1935

Preceding station	Disused railways	Following station
Horringford	British Railways; Southern Region; IoW CR : Sandown to Newport line	Blackwater
Godshill	British Railways; Southern Region; IoW CR : Ventnor West branch	Terminus

== See also ==
- List of closed railway stations in Britain
