= National Cycle Route 23 =

Cycle route running from Reading to Sandown, Isle of Wight

National Cycle Route 23 (or NCR 23) is a route of the United Kingdom National Cycle Network, running from Reading to Sandown. The partially signed route passes through Basingstoke, Eastleigh and Southampton; once across the Solent, it continues through Cowes and Newport and ends in Sandown on the Isle of Wight.

== Route ==
=== Reading to Basingstoke ===
Reading | Basingstoke

Locally referred to as the Calleva Trail, this route is an important part of Hampshire's National Cycle Network. It includes both traffic-free paths and on-road sections, running from Basingstoke Town Centre to Chineham, and continuing along quiet lanes through Silchester and West Berkshire before reaching Reading. However, due to recent development in the area, these roads have become busier than they once were.

map

=== Basingstoke to Alton/Winchester ===
Basingstoke | Alton | Winchester

The first section runs from Basingstoke to Alton and New Alresford, covering 23 miles. It passes through the villages of Cliddesden and Ellisfield and includes both traffic-free paths and on-road sections.

map

=== Winchester to Southampton ===
Winchester | Eastleigh | Southampton

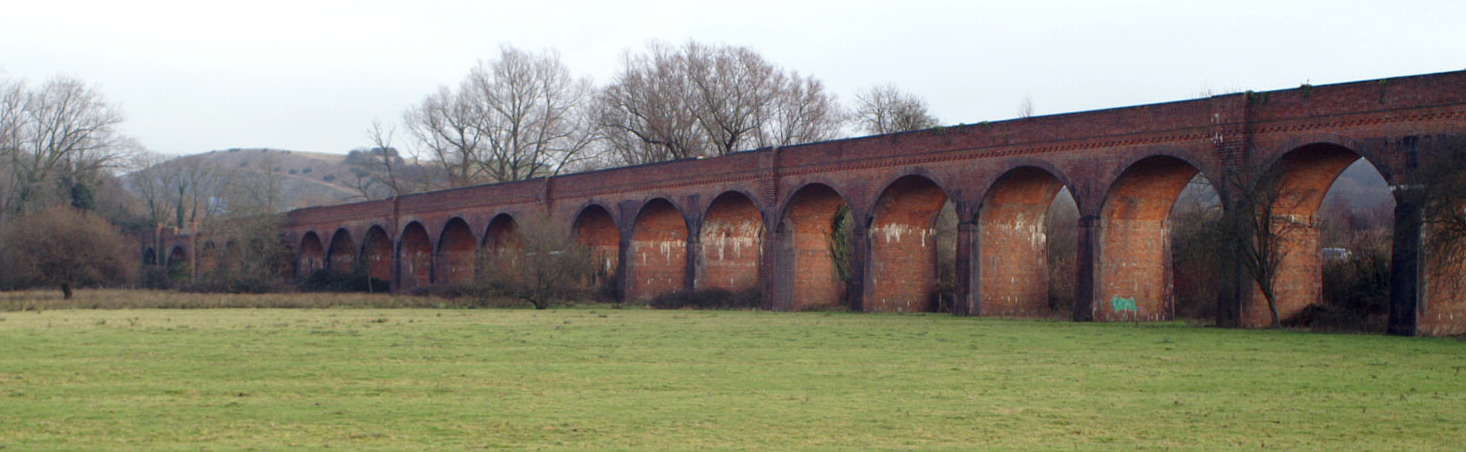
Hockley Viaduct

From Winchester City Mill, the route follows the towpath of the River Itchen through the grounds of Wolvesey Castle before emerging onto College Walk close to the junction with College Street, the location of Winchester College. The route follows College Walk across the river, turns right onto Domum Road and then continues onto the old track bed of the Didcot, Newbury and Southampton Railway alongside the Itchen Navigation, eventually reaching the Hockley Viaduct. This was the last part of NCR 23 to be opened, following a lengthy restoration programme. It was opened to the public in February 2013 by track cyclist Dani King.

South of the viaduct, NCR 23 loops northwards alongside the South West Main Line, crossing the railway and the Hockley Link road before joining Otterbourne Road. The route follows this road through the villages of Compton, Shawford and Otterbourne, then turns left onto Boyatt Lane which takes it into Boyatt Wood. The route follows a cycle path alongside Woodside Avenue through the suburb, crossing into Passfield Avenue in Eastleigh. Towards the end of Passfield Avenue, NCR 23 turns right onto Nightingale Avenue where it meets National Cycle Route 24. NCR 24 heads north along Magpie Lane but NCR 23 continues south to Chestnut Avenue where it turns right, then left onto Stoneham Lane.

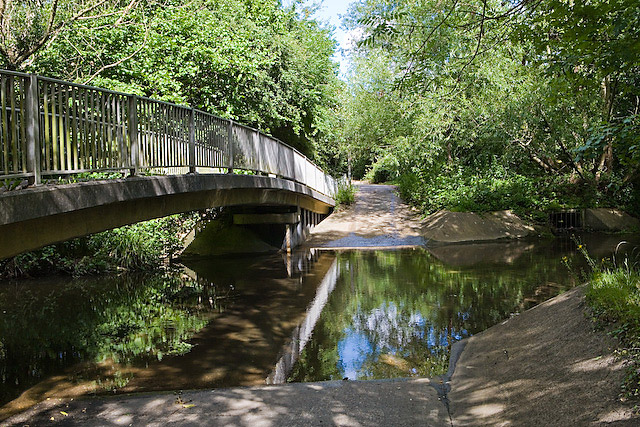
NCR 23 passes through this ford, but the footbridge presents an alternative route

NCR 23 follows a cycle path alongside Stoneham Lane until it reaches North Stoneham House having passed the Concorde Club. At this point NCR 23 swings left, crossing Stoneham Lane and through a ford of Monks Brook on Doncaster Drove. The route follows the lane between Lakeside Country Park to the north and the University of Southampton sports ground to the south, emerging at Wide Lane to follow a shared use path alongside the road. The route continues to follow Wide Lane southwards, past Southampton Airport (Parkway) railway station and the site of the former Ford Transit factory, reaching the A27 road at a roundabout.

NCR 23 crosses the A27 and heads south through Monksbrook Greenway, an area of woodland that once formed the grounds of The Grange, a country house that was located near the road. NCR 23 then makes its way through the Southampton suburb of Mansbridge, travelling along several residential streets before emerging onto Mans Bridge itself, which the route crosses and turns right into Riverside Park. The route follows the towpath through the park, crossing the road at Woodmill and continuing the other side, eventually reaching the Cobden Bridge at the southern extremity of Riverside Park. The route follows the road across the bridge from Bitterne Park to St Denys, taking the first turning left into Priory Road and passing through the site of St Denys Priory, now a residential area. Towards the end of Priory Road the route turns left onto Horseshoe Bridge, leaving the road just before the bridge crosses the railway line.

From here, NCR 23 travels along a shared use boardwalk alongside the tidal section of the River Itchen, then leaves the boardwalk to pass through a small industrial area to reach Radcliffe Road, which it follows until it reaches the A3024 road in Northam. The cycle route crosses the dual carriageway A3024 and crosses the railway near the site of Northam railway station within view of St Mary's Stadium. The route heads through the suburb of St Mary's and westwards into Southampton City Centre, reaching Above Bar Street where the route turns south into the pedestrianised shopping area and on to the Bargate.

The route continues past the Bargate, heading directly south along the High Street and on to Town Quay, where the Red Funnel ferry terminal is located. The route continues on the other side of the Solent.

=== Cowes to Sandown ===
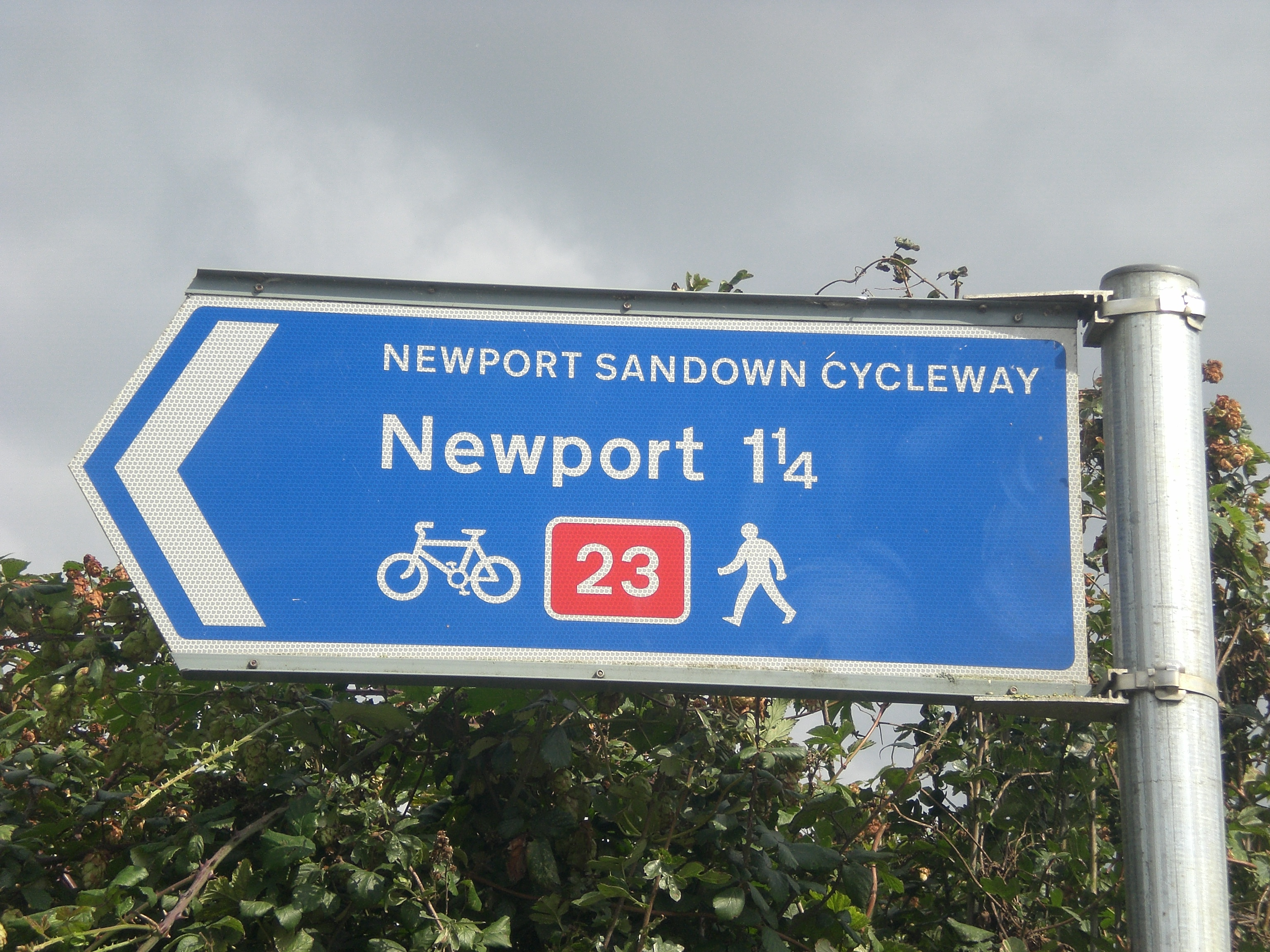
Traffic sign for NCR 23 on the Isle of Wight

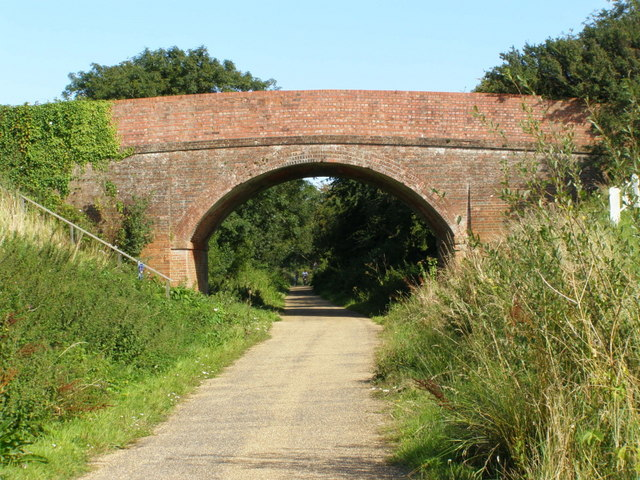
NCR 23, south of Merstone.

East Cowes | Cowes | Newport | Sandown

Upon arrival at East Cowes, one must continue ahead around the one-way system in order to reach the Cowes Floating Bridge, which allows the route to cross the River Medina. There is a £1 return toll for cyclists, and a 2-3 minute crossing brings you to Cowes. The Floating Bridge does not operate a 24-hour service, so this section of the route is not available during late night.

A short distance along the Ferry Road takes you to the junction with Arctic Road, where the cycle route turns to the left, away from the coast. At the end of Arctic Road, past the industrial estate, the route leaves road for the first time on the Island. A short ascent takes you onto the first cyclepath built on the Island, the Cowes to Newport Cyclepath. This route was constructed on the old railway trackbed of the Southern Railway's Cowes to Newport section. Towards Newport, the route crosses an inlet of the River Medina, which the route follows all the way to Newport.

The Cyclepath turns to the left at the edge of the Riverway Industrial Estate, near Newport town centre. From there, there are signs that direct the cyclist towards the Town Quay and along cycle lanes on the pavement of Coppins Bridge roundabout. After more signs, the cyclist finds a freshly tarmacked shared foot/cycle path which leads the route to Shide.

In Shide, the route joins the Sandown to Newport Cyclepath - this again follows the route of a disused railway line (with minor deviations) all the way to Sandown. The route initially follows the River Medina, now a small stream, across the main road at Blackwater. There is no traffic control at this flat crossing, but it is within a speed limited area. Beyond here, the route leaves the railway trackbed for about one mile, skirting neighbouring farmland, then returning to the old route in good time for Merstone.

The former station at Merstone consisted of a single island platform, which still stands. Past this is Merstone Lane, a narrow but heavily used road, which should be crossed with care. Shortly after this, the route passes under a road bridge and converges with the Sunshine Trail. The route then slopes significantly downhill, until it is parallel with the course of a different river, the Eastern Yar. Shortly after this, the route again leaves the railway trackbed for a short detour, caused by limited development along the route ahead. At this point, the surface changes from tarmac to planked duckboards, until reaching Horringford. At this point, the route crosses the main A3056 road, where a toucan crossing is provided.

The route then follows the old railway line across the Yar's floodplain until Langbridge, at the edge of Newchurch, where a slight deviation to the north is required, again due to development on the old route. Beyond Newchurch lies the village of Alverstone, with a final flat crossing with the minor road there before the route arrives at Sandown, on the edge of town between two holiday camp sites. The railway station and town centre can be reached by turning right onto the through road there then following the Sunshine Trail.

map
