= Dillington baronets =

Extinct baronetcy in the Baronetage of England

The Dillington Baronetcy of Knighton, Isle of Wight in the County of Hampshire was created in the Baronetage of England on 6 September 1628 for Robert Dillington, who was a Member of Parliament. He was succeeded by his grandson, and then by the three sons of the second baronet in turn. All the Dillington baronets except Sir John followed the first baronet into Parliament. The baronetcy became extinct on the death of the 2nd baronet's last son, Sir Tristram, 5th Baronet in 1721.

== Dillington baronets, of Knighton (1628) ==
- Sir Robert Dillington, 1st Baronet (died 1664)
- Sir Robert Dillington, 2nd Baronet (c. 1634 – 1687)
- Sir Robert Dillington, 3rd Baronet (c. 1664 – 1689)
- Sir John Dillington, 4th Baronet (died 1706)
- Sir Tristram Dillington, 5th Baronet (c. 1678 – 1721)
