= Ventnor West railway station =

Former railway station in Isle of Wight, UK

Coordinates: 50.59234°N 1.21911°W

Ventnor West
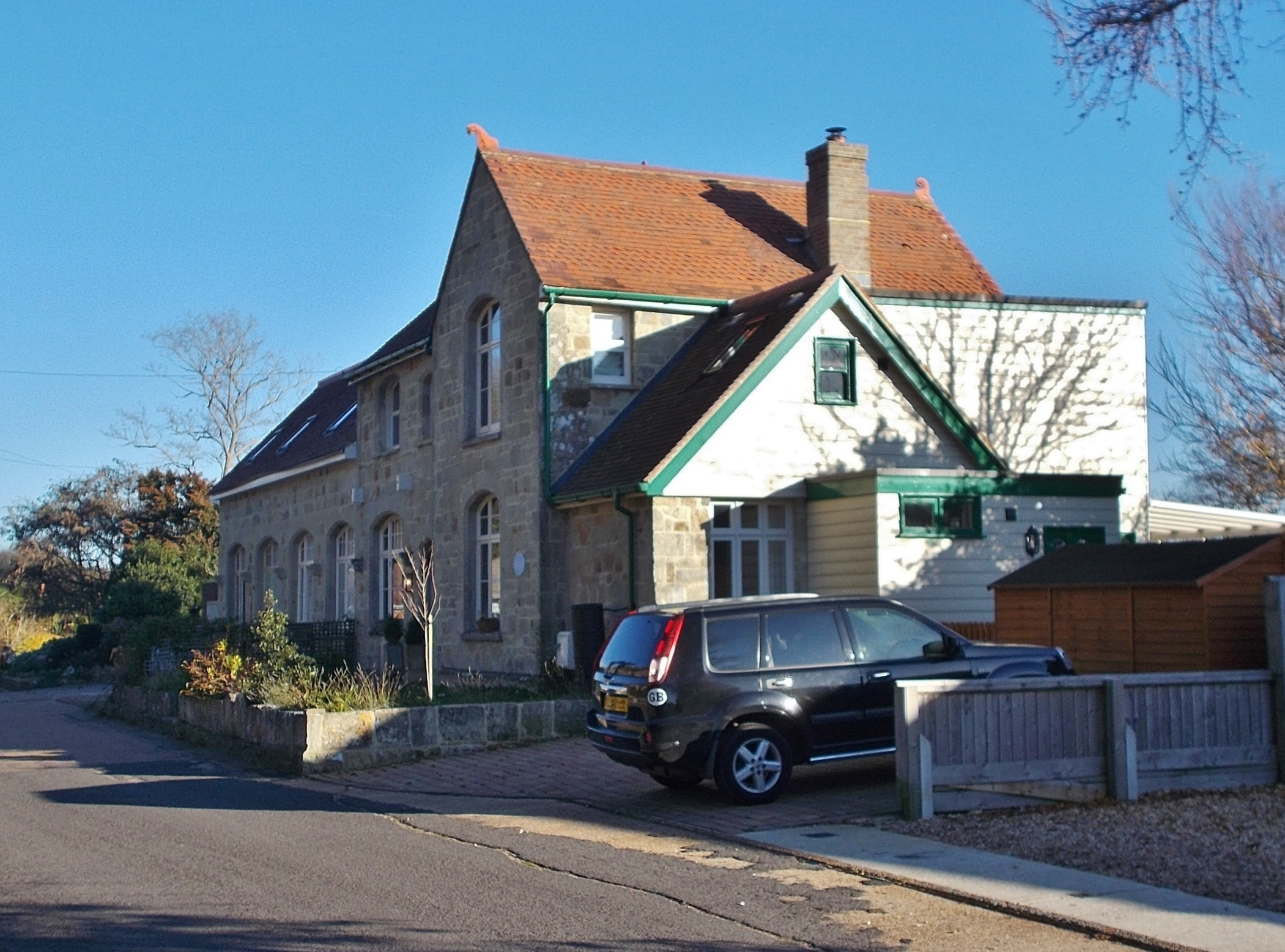
- Ventnor West station building in 2018, now a private residence

General information
- Location: Ventnor, Isle of Wight; England
- Platforms: 2

Other information
- Status: Disused

History
- Pre-grouping: Newport, Godshill and St Lawrence Railway (1900-1913); Isle of Wight Central Railway (1913 to 1923)
- Post-grouping: Southern Railway (1923 to 1948); Southern Region of British Railways (1948 to 1952)

Key dates
- 1 June 1900: Opened (Ventnor Town)
- 1923: Renamed (Ventnor West)
- 15 September 1952: Closed
Location

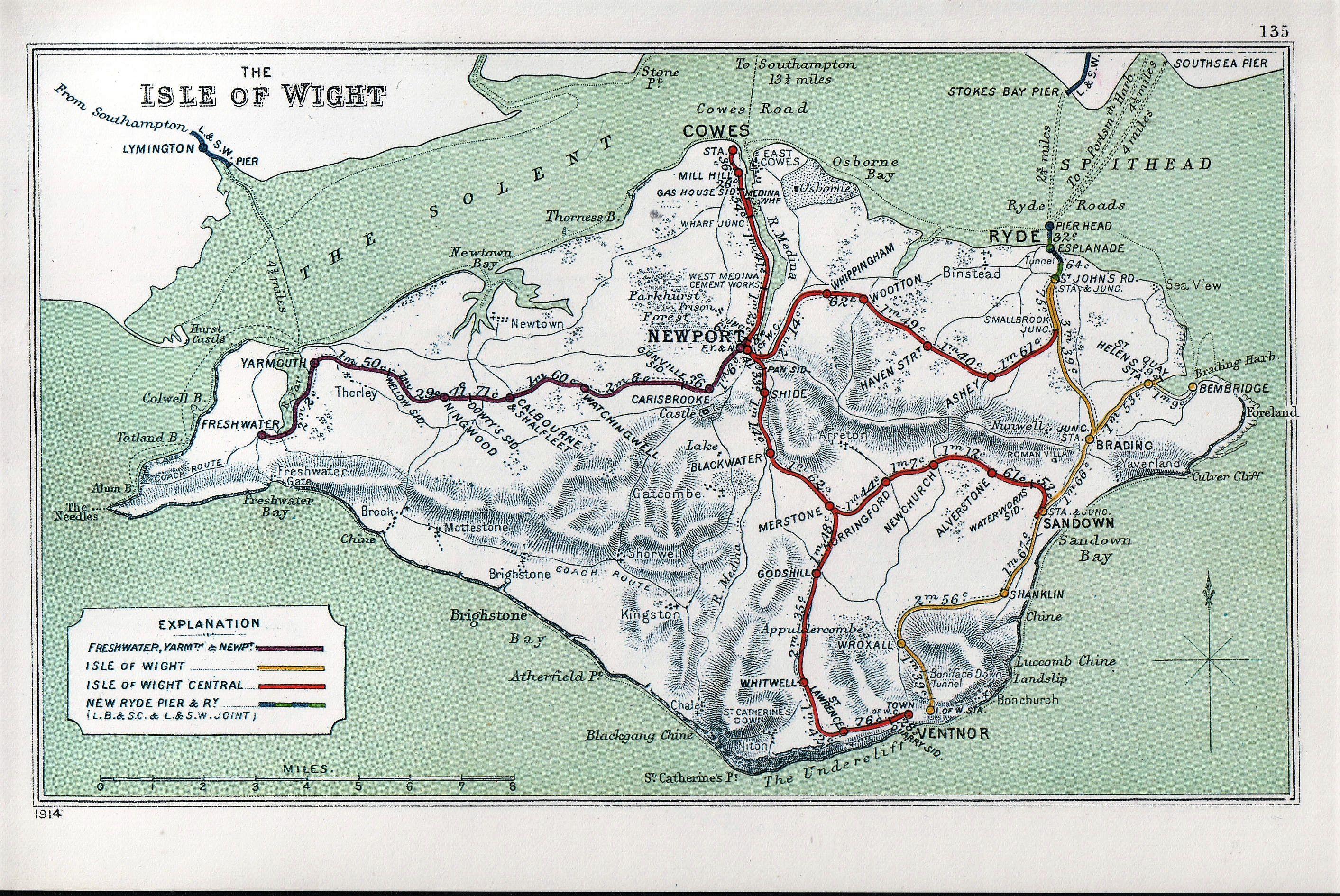
A 1914 Railway Clearing House map of lines around The Isle of Wight.

Ventnor West railway station was in operation from 1900 to 1952 in Ventnor, Isle of Wight.

== History ==
The station was opened on 1 June 1900 as the final addition to the railway network on the Isle of Wight. It opened as Ventnor Town but was renamed in 1923 by the Southern Railway.

Built on the former stables of the Steephill Castle estate, the station was inconveniently situated for the town, being some distance west of the town centre and 168 feet above sea level. Consequently, it never lived up to the expectations of the operators and was an early casualty of the pruning of the railway network. Plans were made to extend the line beyond the station to a new terminus, closer to the town centre. Continuing to run along Park Avenue, the Ventnor Central Terminus would have been sited where Park Avenue meets Zig Zag Road – opposite the Royal Hotel. However, the combination of newly built housing on the proposed formation along Park Avenue and the company's ailing finances meant this scheme was never realised. If it had, it would have provided a very convenient alternative to the Isle of Wight Railway's Ventnor station, located high above the town, and this may have turned around the fortunes of this otherwise very sleepy branch. Today the main station building is still standing, surrounded by modern housing in Castle Close.

The station closed along with the others on the line on 15 September 1952.

== Stationmasters ==
- William Bayley 1900 - c. 1911
- Charles Henry Dennett c. 1915-c. 1920 (afterwards station master at Yarmouth)
- Mr. Hawkins c. 1935
- Henry Wilkinson Harms

Preceding station	Disused railways	Following station
Terminus	British Railways; Southern Region; IoW CR : Ventnor West branch	St Lawrence

== Other stations on the branch ==
The other stations on the Ventnor West branch were:

- Merstone (where the branch joined the Newport-Sandown line)
- Godshill
- Whitwell
- St Lawrence (the original terminus of the line from 1897 to 1900)
