= Sir Robert Dillington, 1st Baronet =

English aristocrat

Sir Robert Dillington, 1st Baronet (ca. 1575–1664) was an English aristocrat of the Dillington baronets, grandfather to Sir Robert Dillington, 2nd Baronet.

He succeeded his father in 1593–1594 and resided for many years at the traditional Dillington residence at Knighton Gorges Manor, Knighton, Newchurch, Isle of Wight before buying the Great Budbridge Manor in the Isle of Wight in 1633. He was created a baronet on 6 September 1628 and became a Member of Parliament for Isle of Wight in 1654–1655.

He died in 1664.

Baronetage of England
| New creation | Baronet (of Knighton); 1628–1664 | Succeeded by Robert Dillington |
