= Blackwater, Isle of Wight =

Village on the Isle of Wight, England

Coordinates: 50°40′32″N 1°16′59″W

Blackwater
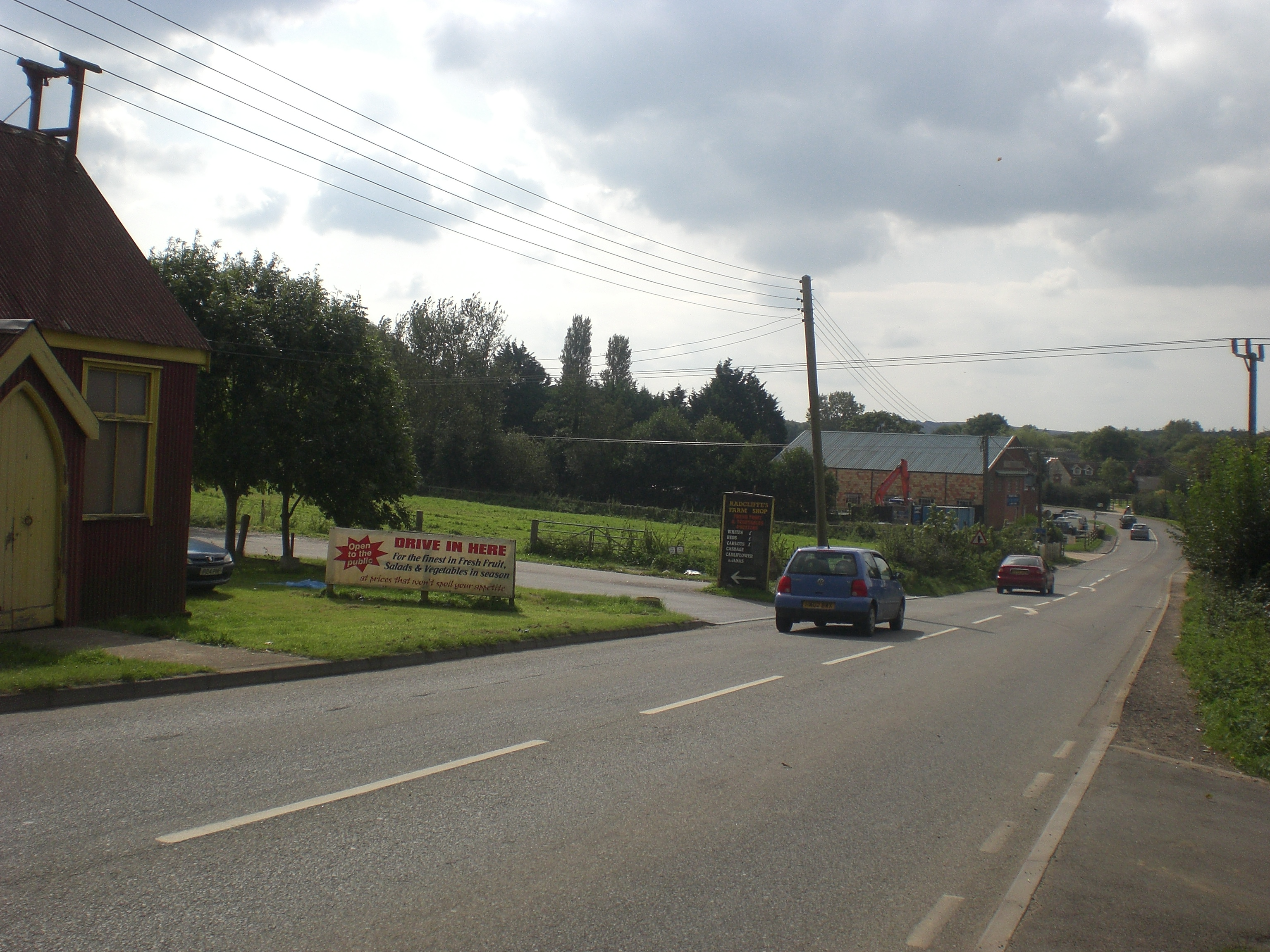
- The main road through Blackwater.

- Location within the Isle of Wight
- OS grid reference: SZ507864
- Unitary authority: Isle of Wight
- Ceremonial county: Isle of Wight
- Region: South East
- Country: England
- Sovereign state: United Kingdom
- Post town: NEWPORT
- Postcode district: PO30
- Dialling code: 01983
- Police: Hampshire and Isle of Wight
- Fire: Hampshire and Isle of Wight
- Ambulance: Isle of Wight
- UK Parliament: Isle of Wight West

Blackwater is a village on the Isle of Wight, England. It is located about two miles south of Newport, close to the geographic centre of the island. It is in the civil parish of Arreton. The Newclose County Cricket Ground is just to the north of the village.

== Name ==
The name means 'the dark coloured stream', from Old English blæc and wæter, which may be referring to a stream that ran into the River Medina there.

The mill there was referred to in the late 1800s as Huffingford Mill, an ancient name recorded in the Domesday Book (1086) as Ovingefort or Huncheford, later being called Huvingeford (1289) and Hofyngeford (~1300). It is suspected to mean 'the ford of the people living by the hood-shaped hill', from Old English hūfe, -inga- and ford. The hill may be Great Down or St George's Down.

== Former Railway Station ==
Newport Junction Railway opened a railway station at Blackwater. Blackwater Station first appeared on railway timetables in June, 1876 and operated until June 6, 1956. The trackbed of the former railway line is now part of National Cycle Route 23.

== Blackwater Lunatic Asylum ==
On July 7, 1896, the Blackwater Lunatic Asylum (later known as the Whitecroft Hospital) opened, after 2 years of work. Before then the patients were taken to Knowle Hospital, near Fareham, Hampshire. Because of the cost it was decided that the Island should have its own, and money was granted for its construction. Various sites were put forward, but Whitecroft Farm, about 1 mile away from Newport, was chosen and 50 acres of land leased. B. S. Jacob from Kingston upon Hull was the architect. It supplied much-needed employment for the Island at the time, and, as similar development was happening at Parkhurst, people from the Mainland came and helped. It was estimated that 6 million bricks would be needed to be made from clay locally, but that was not possible. More bricks were imported. To speed up the building, railway tracks were laid, with horses pulling wagons. A brief strike was called between 2 workers, but they returned to work without their needs being met. Soon after, it was discovered that the water supply was contaminated and 2 men died of typhoid fever. When the building was completed, a new well was sunk and a water tower (now a Grade II listed building) was built. Inside the buildings there were kitchens, workshops, a laundry room, a well house, staff cottages and a lodge.

After the opening, 40 men came by train to Blackwater and walked 1 mile to the site of the asylum. It was intended to house ~300 people. Patients were only allowed 1 visit per month. In 1992 it closed, with the old buildings temporarily being used as offices after. They have now been converted into private houses.

When work began to convert it into private homes, some builders walked off site, saying they felt uneasy. It is claimed to be one of the most haunted places on the Island.

== Transport ==
Public transport is provided by Southern Vectis bus routes 2 and 3, serving Newport, Ryde, Sandown, Shanklin and Ventnor. Former Wightbus 33 between Newport and Ryde, also serves part of the village.
