= Sir Robert Dillington, 2nd Baronet =

English politician

Sir Robert Dillington, 2nd Baronet (c. 1634 – 25 April 1687) was an English politician who sat in the House of Commons at various times between 1659 and 1685.

Dillington was the son of Robert Dillington of Mottistone and grandson of Sir Robert Dillington, 1st Baronet. He matriculated at Queen's College, Oxford on 9 December 1653 and was of Gray's Inn in 1654.

In 1659, Dillington was elected Member of Parliament for Newport in the Third Protectorate Parliament. He was elected MP for Newport in the Convention Parliament in 1660.

Knighton Gorges Manor, 1781

In 1664, when his grandfather died, he succeeded to the baronetcy and to the Knighton Gorges estate on the Isle of Wight. He was elected MP for Newport again in 1670 in the Cavalier Parliament and sat until 1685.

Dillington died at the age of 52. He had married twice, firstly Jane, the daughter of John Freke of Cerne Abbey, Dorset with whom he had several children, of whom only 2 sons and 1 daughter survived and secondly Anne, the daughter and coheiress of William Webb, a London grocer and Alderman, with whom he had a further son and 2 daughters. Dillington's three sons, Robert, John, and Tristram, succeeded him in turn to the baronetcy.

Parliament of England
Preceded by Not represented in restored Rump	Member of Parliament for Newport (Isle of Wight); 1660; With: Sir William Oglander, 1st Baronet	Succeeded by Sir William Oglander, 1st Baronet; William Glascock
Baronetage of England
Preceded by Robert Dillington	Baronet (of Knighton); 1664–1687	Succeeded by Robert Dillington
